= List of villages in Ariyalur district =

This is an alphabetical list of villages in Ariyalur district, Tamil Nadu, India.

== A ==
- Adhanakurichi
- Alagapuram
- Alagiyamanavalam
- Alanduraiyarkattalai
- Alathiyur
- Amanakkanthondi
- Ammbappur
- Ammenabath
- Anaikudam
- Anandavadi
- Andimadam
- Andipattakkadu
- Anganur
- Angarayanallur (East)
- Anikudichan (North)
- Anikudichan (South)
- Annimangalam
- Ariyalur (North)
- Arungal
- Asaveerankudikkadu
- Authukurichi
- Avansuthamalli
- Ayanathathanur
- Ayanathur
- Ayyappa Nayakan Pettai
- Ayyur

== C–E ==
- Chinnapattakadu
- Cholamadevi
- Devamangalam
- Devanur
- Edaayankurichi
- Edanganni
- Edayar
- Edayathankudi
- Elaiyur
- Elaiyur (East)
- Elaiyur (West)
- Elakurichi
- Elandakudam
- Elayaperumalnallur
- Eravangudy

== G–I ==
- Govindapuram
- Govindaputhur
- Guruvadi
- Guruvalapparkovil
- Illuppaiyur
- Irugaiyur
- Irumbilikurichi

== K ==
- Kadambur
- Kadugur
- Kallankurichi
- Kallathur
- Kamarasavalli
- Kandiratheertham
- Karaikurichi
- Karaiyavetti
- Karuppilakattalai
- Karuppur
- Kattagaram (North)
- Kattagaram (South)
- Kattathur (North)
- Kattathur (South)
- Kavanur
- Kayarlabath
- Keelakolathur
- Keelakudiyiruppu
- Keelanatham
- Keezhakavattankurichi
- Keezhamaligai
- Keezhapalur
- Kilimangalam
- Kodalikaruppur
- Kodangudi (North)
- Kodangudi (South)
- Koluthunganallur
- Koovathur (North)
- Koovathur (South)
- Kovil Esanai (East)
- Kovil Esanai (West)
- Kovilur
- Kulamanickam (West)
- Kulumur
- Kundaveli (East)
- Kundaveli (West)
- Kuvagam
- Kuzhavadaiyan

== M–O ==
- Mallur
- Managethi
- Manakkudaiyan
- Manapathur
- Manjamedu
- Mannuzhi
- Melapalur
- Muthuservamadam
- Naduvalur (East)
- Naduvalur (West)
- Nagalkuzhi
- Nagamangalam
- Nakkampadi
- Namangunam
- Nayaganaipriyal
- Olaiyur
- Oriyur
- Ottakoil

== P ==
- Palinganatham
- Pallividai
- Papanacheri
- Pappakudi (North)
- Pappakudi (South)
- Paranam
- Parukkal (East)
- Parukkal (West)
- Periakrishnapuram
- Periyakurichi
- Periyanagalur
- Periyathirukonam
- Periyavalayam
- Pilakurichi
- Pilichikuzhi
- Pirancheri
- Pitchanur
- Ponparappi
- Pottaveli
- Pudukkottai Village
- Pungankuzhi

== R–S ==
- Ramanallur
- Rangiyam
- Rayampuram
- Reddipalayam
- Sannasinallur
- Sannavur (North)
- Sannavur (South)
- Sathamangalam
- Sathambadi
- Sengunthapuram
- Sennivanam
- Silumbur (North)
- Silumbur (South)
- Siluvaicheri
- Sirkalathur
- Sirukadambur
- Siruvalur (Ariyalur)
- Sooriyamanal
- Sripurandan (North)
- Sripurandan (South)
- Sriraman
- Sullangudi
- Suthamalli

== T ==
- Thalavoi (North)
- Thalavoi (South)
- Thaluthalaimedu
- Thandalai
- Thathanur (East)
- Thathanur (West)
- Thelur
- Thenkatchiperumalnatham
- Thirukalappur
- Thirumanur
- Thirumazhapadi
- Thuthur
- Tular

== U–V ==
- Udayanatham (East)
- Udayanatham (West)
- Udayarpalayam R.F.
- Udayavarthinayur
- Uliyankudi
- Ulkottai (North)
- Ulkottai (South)
- Unjini
- Uthirakudi
- Vadaveekam
- Vadugapalayam
- Valaikurichi
- Valajanagaram
- Vanathirayanpattinam
- Vangudi
- Vanjinapuram
- Varanavasi
- Variyankaval
- Vathiyur
- Vembukudi
- Venmankondan (East)
- Venmankondan (West)
- Vethiyarvettu
- Vilandhai
- Vilupanankurichi
