= Sendurai Block =

Revenue block of Ariyalur district, Tamil Nadu, India

Sendurai block is a revenue block of Ariyalur district of the Indian state of Tamil Nadu. This revenue block consist of 30 panchayat villages.

== Panchayat Villages ==
They are,

SI.No	Panchayat Village
1	Adhanakurichi
2	Alathiyur
3	Anandavadi
4	Asaveerankudikkadu
5	Ayanathathanur
6	Irumbilikurichi
7	Keezhamaligai
8	Kulumur
9	Kumiliyam
10	Manakkudaiyan
11	Manapathur
12	Maruvathur
13	Nagalkuzhi
14	Nakkampadi
15	Nallampalayam
16	Namangunam
17	Palayakudi
18	Paranam
19	Periyakurichi
20	Pilakurichi
21	Ponparappi
22	Sannasinallur
23	Sendurai
24	Sirukadambur
25	Sirukalathur
26	Thalavai
27	Thular
28	Unjini
29	Vanjinapuram
30	Veerakkan
