= Thirumanur Block =

Thirumanur block is a revenue block of Ariyalur district of the Indian state of Tamil Nadu. This revenue block consist of 36 panchayat villages.

== List of Panchayat Villages ==
They are,

| SI.No | Panchayat Village |
|---|---|
| 1 | Alagiyamanavalam |
| 2 | Annimangalam |
| 3 | Ayansuthamalli |
| 4 | Chinnapattakadu |
| 5 | Elakurichi |
| 6 | Elandakudam |
| 7 | K.Kavattankurichi |
| 8 | Kamarasavalli |
| 9 | Kandiratheertham |
| 10 | Karaiyavetti |
| 11 | Keelaiyur |
| 12 | Keelakolathur |
| 13 | Keezhapalur |
| 14 | Koman |
| 15 | Kovilesanai |
| 16 | Kovilur |
| 17 | Kulamanickam |
| 18 | Kuruvadi |
| 19 | Manjamedu |
| 20 | Melapalur |
| 21 | Palinganatham |
| 22 | Papanacheri |
| 23 | Poondi |
| 24 | Pudukottai |
| 25 | Sannavoor |
| 26 | Sathamangalam |
| 27 | Sembiyakudi |
| 28 | Sullangudi |
| 29 | Thirumalaipadi |
| 30 | Thirumanur |
| 31 | Thuthur |
| 32 | Vadugapalayam |
| 33 | Varanavasi |
| 34 | Venganur |
| 35 | Vettriyur |
| 36 | Vilupanankurichi |
