= T.Palur Block =

T.Palur block is a revenue block of Ariyalur district of the Indian state of Tamil Nadu. This revenue block consist of 33 panchayat villages.

== Panchayat Villages ==
They are,

SI.No	Panchayat Village
1	Adichanur
2	Ambapur
3	Anaikudam
4	Anikurichy
5	Chinthamani
6	Cholamadevi
7	Edanganni
8	Erugaiyur
9	Govindaputhur
10	Gunamangalam
11	Kadambur
12	Kaduvettankurichi
13	Karaikurichi
14	Karkudi
15	Kasankottai
16	Keelanatham
17	Kodalikaruppur
18	Kodankudi
19	Managathi
20	Naduvalur
21	Nayaganaipiriyal
22	P.P.Nallur
23	Parukkal
24	Sathambadi
25	Sripuranthan
26	Suthamalli
27	T.K.P.Natham
28	T.Palur
29	Udayanatham
30	Uliyankudi
31	Valaikurichi
32	Vembukudi
33	Venmankondan

== Cricket Teams ==
TTCC- Tahlith thendral Cricket

     club

TCC- Titans Cricket Club.

RCC - Royal challengers cricket club.
