= Anikudichan =

Anikudichan may refer to any of the following villages in Ariyalur district, Tamil Nadu, India:

- Anikudichan (North)
- Anikudichan (South)
