= Ammenabath =

Coordinates: 11.1402208°N 79.1076813°E

- village
- Interactive map of Ammenabath
- Country: India
- State: Tamil Nadu
- District: Ariyalur

Population (2001)
  - Total: 526

Languages
  - Official: Tamil
- Time zone: UTC+5:30 (IST)
- Vehicle registration: TN-
- Coastline: 0 kilometres (0 mi)
- Sex ratio: 1039 ♂/♀
- Literacy: 62.1%

Ammenabath is a village in the Ariyalur taluk of Ariyalur district, Tamil Nadu, India.

== Demographics ==
As of 2001 census, Ammenabath had a total population of 526 with 258 males and 268 females.

== See also ==
- List of villages in Ariyalur district
