= Anganur =

Anganur Anganoor
- village
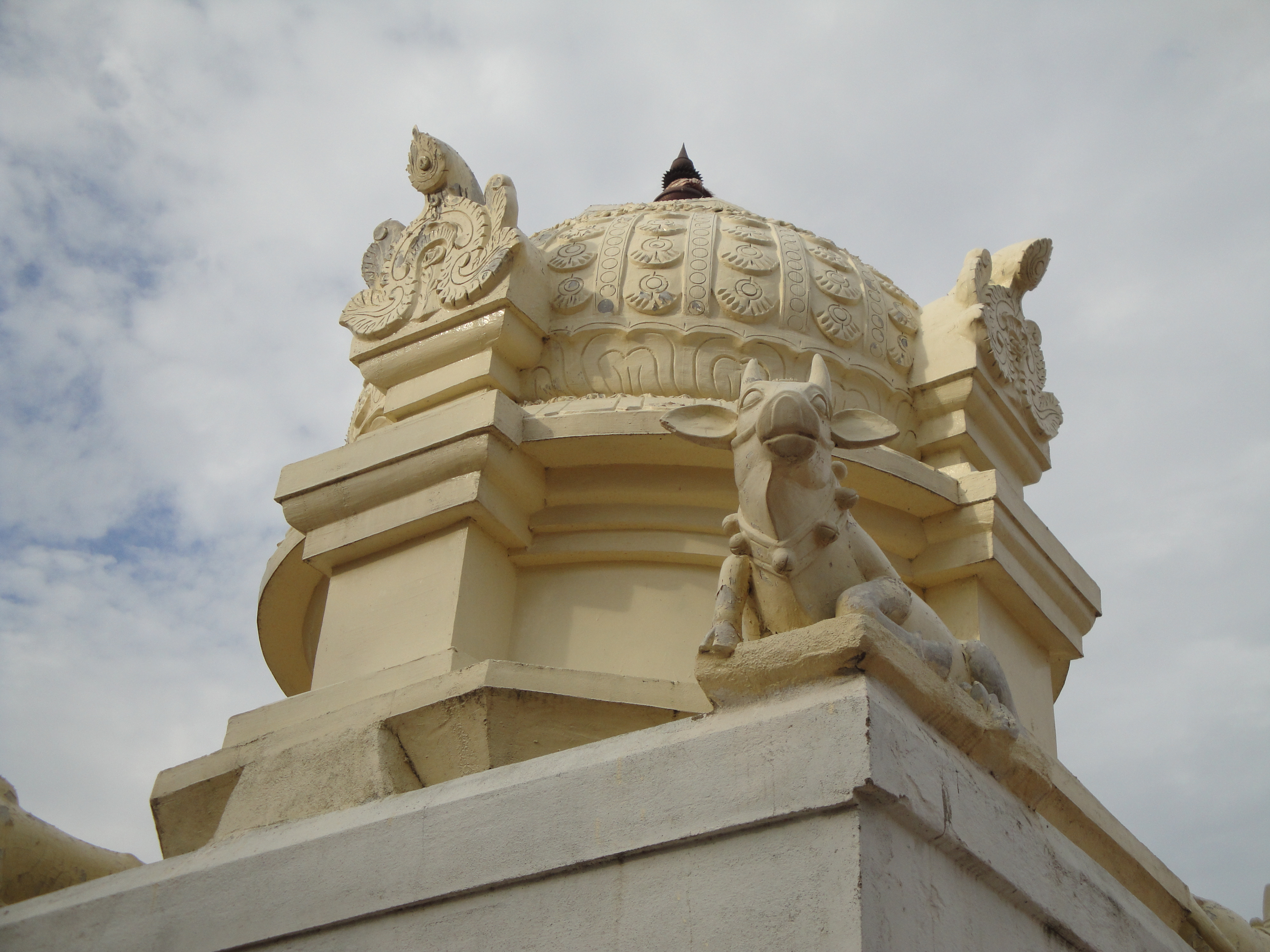

- Location in Tamil Nadu, India Anganur (India)
- Coordinates: 11°21′26.80″N 79°9′36.21″E
- Country: India
- State: Tamil Nadu
- District: Ariyalur

Population
  - Total: 1,000 (Nearly)

Languages
  - Official: Tamil
- Time zone: UTC+5:30 (IST)
- PIN: 621709
- Telephone code: 04329
- Vehicle registration: TN-61
- Nearest city: sendurai, Tittakudi
- Lok Sabha constituency: chidambaram
- Vidhan Sabha constituency: Kunnam
- Avg. summer temperature: 38 °C (100 °F)
- Avg. winter temperature: 30 °C (86 °F)

Anganur is a village in the Sannasinallur panchayat, Sendurai taluk, of Ariyalur district, Tamil Nadu, India, located 14 km from Sendurai and 8 km from Tittakudi. The river "Chinna Aaru" (small river) passes through this village. It is notably the birthplace of Dalit activist, VCK Chairman, and MP Thol. Thirumavalavan.

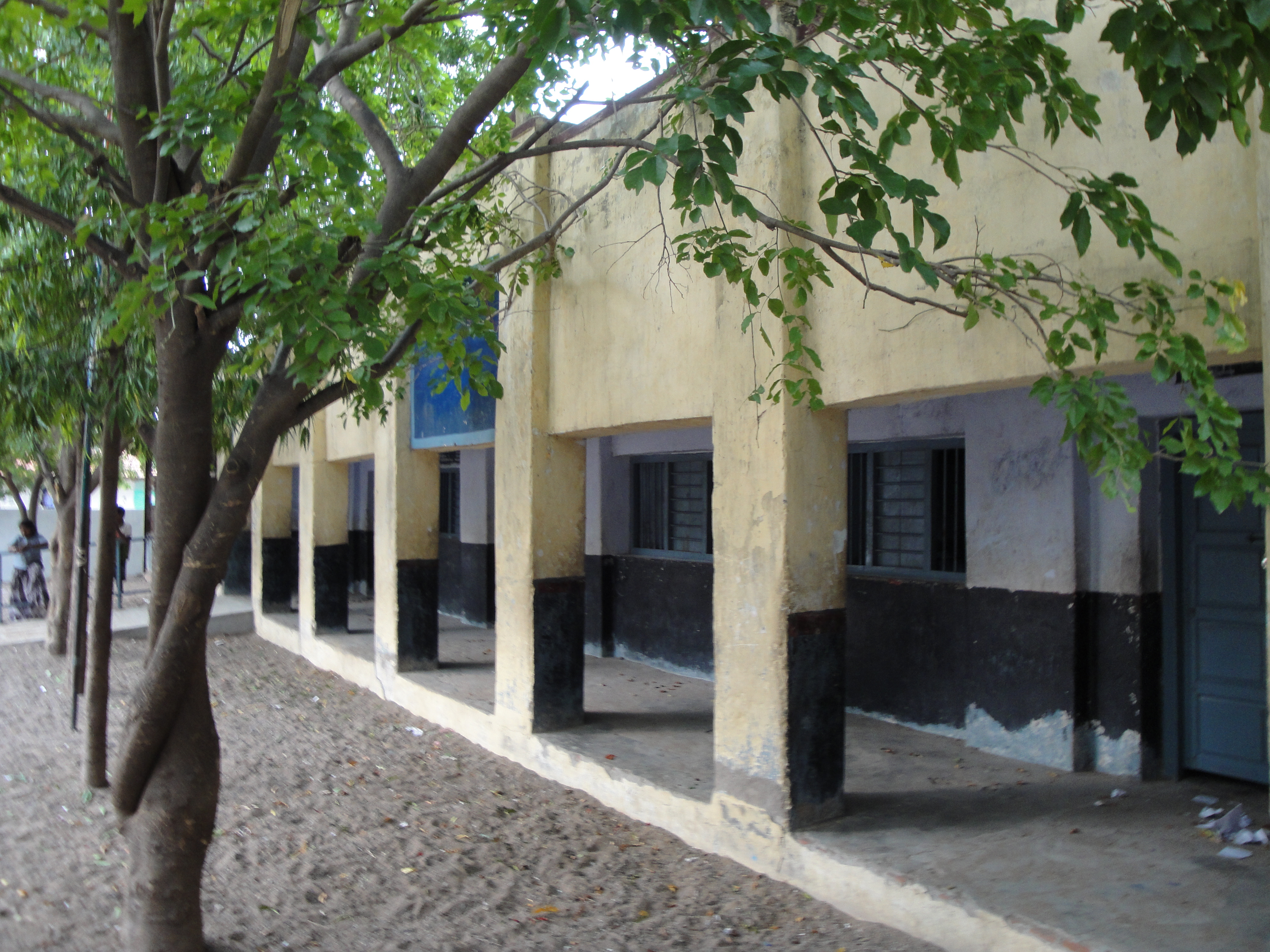
Anganur School

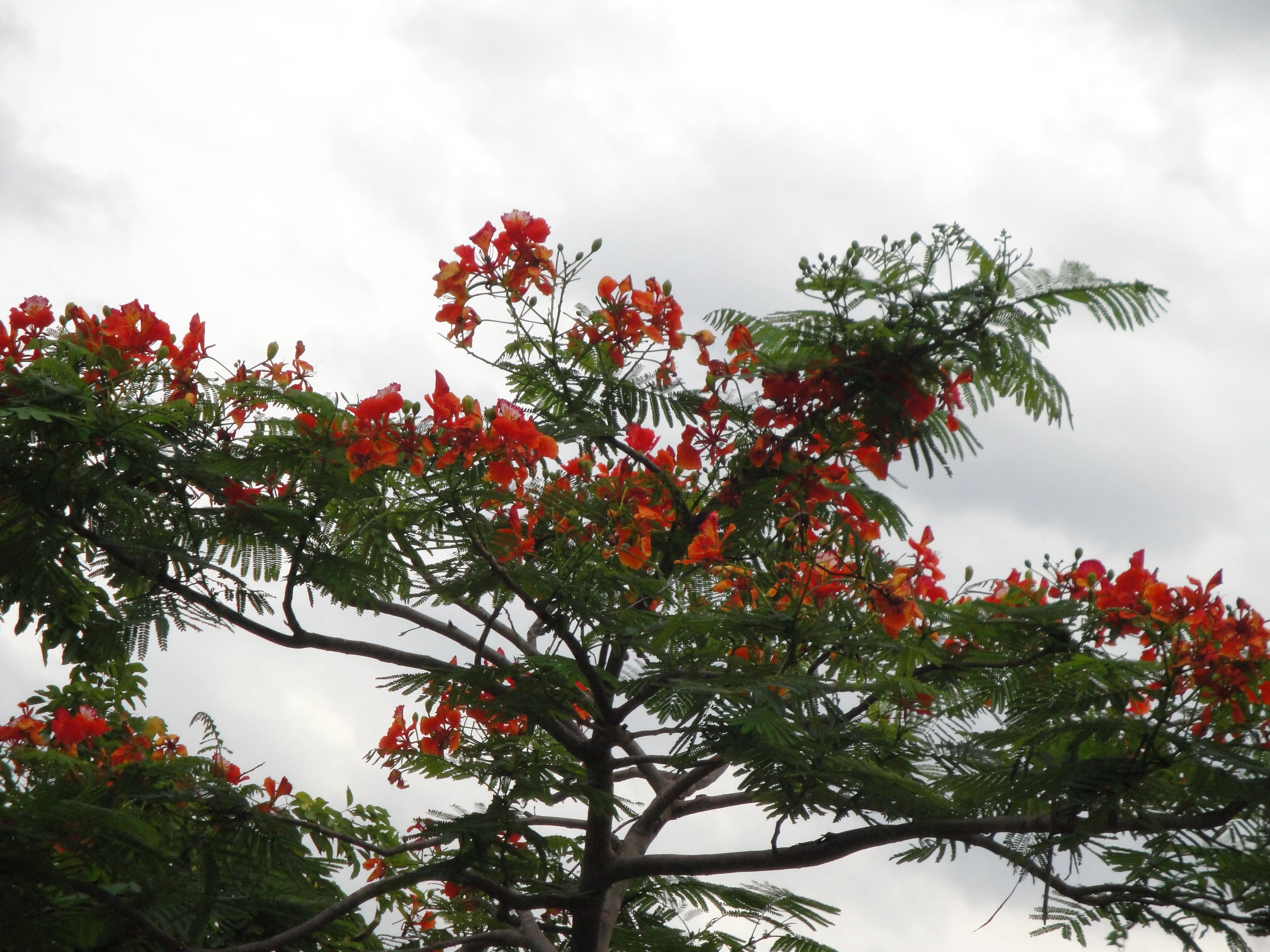
Anganur Nature

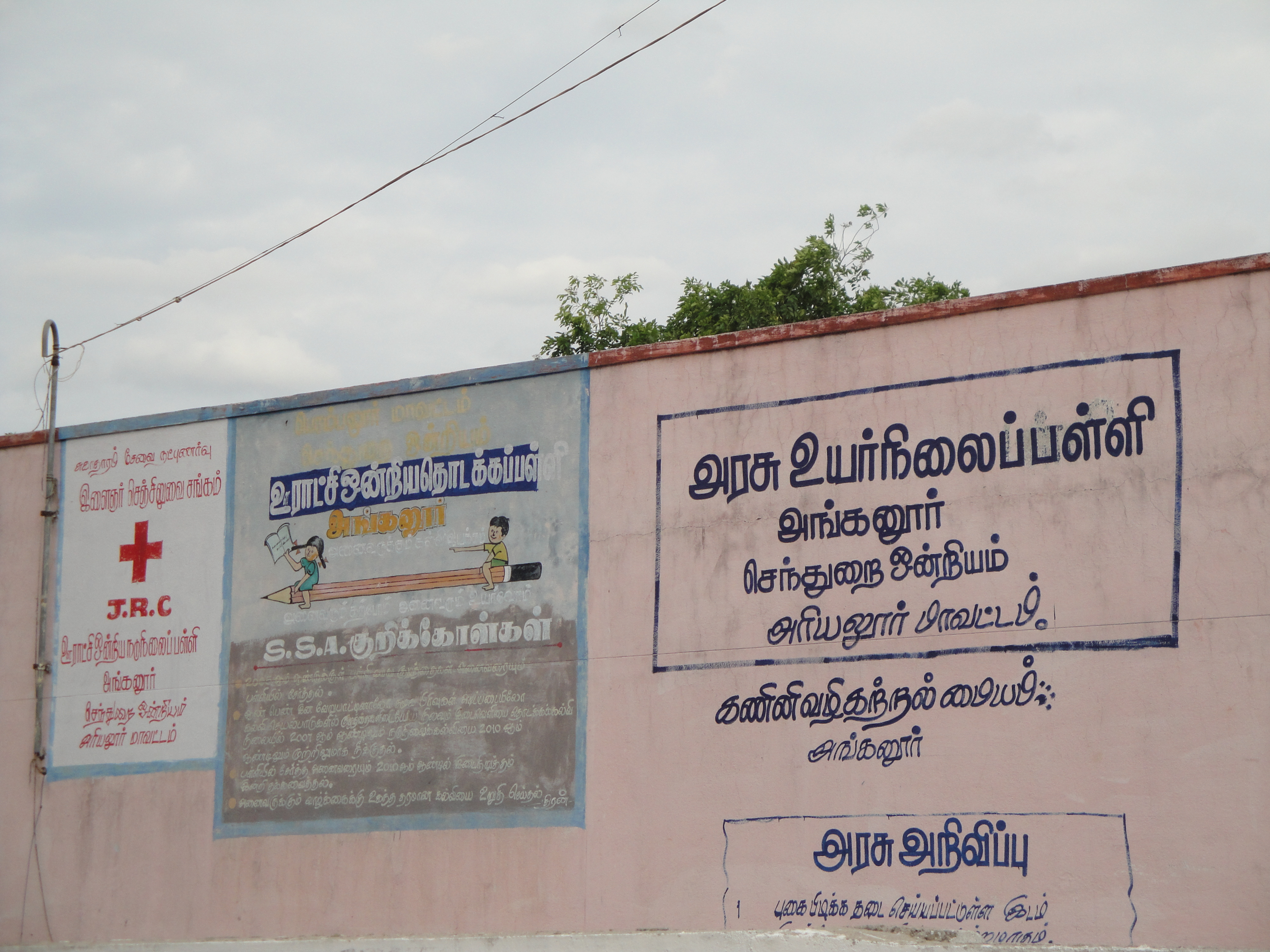
Anganur School1

== See also ==
- List of villages in Ariyalur district
