= Sendurai (disambiguation) =

Sendurai is the headquarters of the Sendurai taluk in the Ariyalur district of the Indian state of Tamil Nadu.

Sendurai may also refer to:

- Sendurai taluk, a taluk of Ariyalur district
- Sendurai Block, a revenue block of Ariyalur district
