= Guruvadi =

Coordinates: 12°33′N 79°43′E

- village
- Interactive map of Guruvadi
- Country: India
- State: Tamil Nadu
- District: Ariyalur

Population (2001)
  - Total: 2,781

Languages
  - Official: Tamil
- Time zone: UTC+5:30 (IST)
- Vehicle registration: TN-
- Coastline: 0 kilometres (0 mi)
- Sex ratio: 986 ♂/♀
- Literacy: 54.05%

Guruvadi is a village in the Ariyalur taluk of Ariyalur district, Tamil Nadu, India.

== Demographics ==
As of 2001 census, Guruvadi had a total population of 2781 with 1400 males and 1381 females.
