= Alanduraiyarkattalai =

- village
- Location in Tamil Nadu, India Alanduraiyarkattalai (India)
- Coordinates: 11°2′5″N 79°11′23″E
- Country: India
- State: Tamil Nadu
- District: Ariyalur

Population (2001)
  - Total: 1,795

Languages
  - Official: Tamil
- Time zone: UTC+5:30 (IST)
- Vehicle registration: TN-
- Coastline: 0 kilometres (0 mi)
- Sex ratio: 970 ♂/♀
- Literacy: 44.2%

Alanduraiyarkattalai is a village in the Ariyalur taluk of Ariyalur district, Tamil Nadu, India.

== Demographics ==
As of 2001 census, Alanduraiyarkattalai had a total population of 1795 with 911 males and 884 females.

== See also ==
- List of villages in Ariyalur district
