= Andipattakkadu =

- village
- Location in Tamil Nadu, India Andipattakkadu (India)
- Coordinates: 11°1′19″N 79°11′16″E
- Country: India
- State: Tamil Nadu
- District: Ariyalur

Government
  - Type: Gram panchayat

Population (2001)
  - Total: 3,083

Languages
  - Official: Tamil
- Time zone: UTC+5:30 (IST)
- Vehicle registration: TN-61
- Coastline: 0 kilometres (0 mi)
- Sex ratio: 970 ♂/♀
- Literacy: 58.54%

Andipattakkadu is a village and Gram panchayat in the Ariyalur taluk of Ariyalur district, Tamil Nadu, India. The Villages Andipattakkadu, Vallakulam are Puthoor are includes in the Andpattakkadu Gram Panchayat

== Demographics ==
As of 2001 census, Andipattakkadu had a total population of 3083 with 1565 males and 1518 females.

== See also ==
- List of villages in Ariyalur district
