= Karuppur, Ariyalur =

Karuppur Melakaruppur
- village
- Interactive map of Karuppur
- Coordinates: 10°51′33″N 78°52′19″E
- Country: India
- State: Tamil Nadu
- District: Ariyalur

Population (2001)
  - Total: 4,334

Languages
  - Official: Tamil
- Time zone: UTC+5:30 (IST)
- Vehicle registration: TN-61
- Coastline: 0 kilometres (0 mi)
- Sex ratio: 983 ♂/♀
- Literacy: 59.96%

Karuppur (Senapathy) is a village in the Ariyalur taluk of Ariyalur district, Tamil Nadu, India.

== Demographics ==
As of 2001 census, Karuppur (Senapathy) had a total population of 4,334 with 2,186 males and 2,148 females.
