= Pudukkottai (disambiguation) =

Pudukkottai is a city in Tamil Nadu, India.

Pudukkottai (lit. 'New Fort') may also refer to:

- Pudukkottai district, a district of Tamil Nadu centred on the above city
  - Pudukkottai (Lok Sabha constituency), Parliament of India
  - Pudukkottai (State Assembly Constituency)
  - Pudukkottai block, revenue block
  - Pudukkottai division, revenue division
  - Pudukkottai taluk, subdistrict
  - Pudukkottai railway station, in the city
  - Pudukkottai State, a kingdom and later a princely state in British India with the city as its capital, which existed from 1680 until 1948
- Pudukkottai Village, Tamil Nadu, India
