= Sennivanam =

Coordinates: 11°13′N 79°10′E

- village
- Interactive map of Sennivanam
- Country: India
- State: Tamil Nadu
- District: Ariyalur

Population (2001)
  - Total: 1,680

Languages
  - Official: Tamil
- Time zone: UTC+5:30 (IST)
- PIN: 621718
- Vehicle registration: TN-61
- Coastline: 0 kilometres (0 mi)
- Sex ratio: 1127 ♂/♀
- Literacy: 59.32%

Sennivanam is a village in the Ariyalur taluk of Ariyalur district, Tamil Nadu, India.

== Demographics ==
As of 2001 census, Sennivanam had a total population of 1680 with 790 males and 890 females. There is a Shiva temple in the southern side of this village.
