= Pungankuzhi =

- village
- Country: India
- State: Tamil Nadu
- District: Ariyalur

Population (2001)
  - Total: 3,208

Languages
  - Official: Tamil
- Time zone: UTC+5:30 (IST)
- Vehicle registration: TN-
- Coastline: 0 kilometres (0 mi)
- Sex ratio: 1029 ♂/♀
- Literacy: 57.83%

Pungankuzhi is a village in the Ariyalur taluk of Ariyalur district, Tamil Nadu, India.

== Demographics ==
As of 2001 census, Pungankuzhi had a total population of 3208 with 1581 males and 1627 females.
