= Kayarlabath =

- village
- Country: India
- State: Tamil Nadu
- District: Ariyalur

Population (2001)
  - Total: 4,265

Languages
  - Official: Tamil
- Time zone: UTC+5:30 (IST)
- PIN: 621705
- Vehicle registration: TN-61
- Coastline: 0 kilometres (0 mi)
- Nearest city: Trichy, Tanjore, Kumbakonam
- Sex ratio: 931 ♂/♀
- Literacy: 77.13%
- Lok Sabha constituency: Chidambaram
- Climate: Normal (Köppen)
- Avg. summer temperature: 36 °C (97 °F)
- Avg. winter temperature: 22 °C (72 °F)

Kayarlabath is a village in the Ariyalur taluk of Ariyalur district, Tamil Nadu, India.

== Demographics ==
As of 2001 census, Kayarlabath (கயர்லாபாத்) had a total population of 4265 with 2209 males and 2056 females.
