= Alathiyur =

Alathiyur may refer to any of the following places in India:

- Alathiyur, Ariyalur, Tamil Nadu
- Alathiyur, Malappuram, Kerala
