= Ramanallur =

- hamlet
- Location in Tamil Nadu, India Ramanallur (India)
- Coordinates: 10°56′59″N 79°13′14″E
- Country: India
- State: Tamil Nadu
- District: Ariyalur

Population (2001)
  - Total: 2,500

Languages
  - Official: Tamil
- Time zone: UTC+5:30 (IST)
- Vehicle registration: TN-
- Coastline: 0 kilometres (0 mi)
- Nearest city: Thanjavur
- Lok Sabha constituency: Chidambaram

Ramanallur is a small islet located in the Kollidam River. It is a part of the Revenue Village of Alagiyamanavalam, Ariyalur taluk, Ariyalur district, Tamil Nadu, India. It had a population of about 2,500 in 2016.

== Geography ==
Ramanallur is located at 10°56′N 79°13′E. It stretches 5 km (3.1 mi) east-west and 2 km (1.2 mi) north-south.

The islet consists of two hamlets: Mela Ramanallur and Keezha Ramanallur.

== Connection to mainland ==
A bridge connecting the islet to Alagiyamanavalam was opened to the public in February 2016. Prior to that, coracles were often used to cross the river to the mainland, with floats and bullock carts used during summer; floods would often completely cut off the islet from the mainland.

There remains one connection from the mainland to the islet, as of August 2023. Another bridge, which planned to connect south to Thanjavur district, received ₹55 crore (equivalent to ₹68 crore or US$7.1 million in 2023) of funding from the Tamil Nadu Government and had the foundation stone laid by 2017, but has yet to be completed. A September 2019 incident, in which three people were killed when a boat capsized carrying them back from Mela Ramanallur to Thanjavur district, renewed demands for the bridge to be completed.
