= Alagapuri, Ariyalur =

Coordinates: 11.6131°N 78.55°E

Alagapuri Alagapuri
- Village
- Location within Tamil Nadu Location within India
- Country: India
- State: Tamil Nadu
- District: Ariyalur

Population (2001)
  - Total: 5,105

Languages
  - Official: Tamil
- Time zone: UTC+5:30 (IST)
- PIN: 608901

Alagapuri is a village in the Udayarpalayam taluk of Ariyalur district, Tamil Nadu, India. It is also Known as alagapuram

== Demographics ==
As per the 2001 census, Alagapuri had a total population of 5105 with 2539 males and 2566 females.

== See also ==
- List of villages in Ariyalur district
