= Ottakoil =

- village
- Location in Tamil Nadu, India Ottakoil (India)
- Coordinates: 11.184464°N 79.127254°E
- Country: India
- State: Tamil Nadu
- District: Ariyalur

Population (2001)
  - Total: 3,882

Languages
  - Official: Tamil
- Time zone: UTC+5:30 (IST)
- Vehicle registration: TN-
- Coastline: 0 kilometres (0 mi)
- Sex ratio: 1029 ♂/♀
- Literacy: 50.28%

Ottakoil is a village in the Ariyalur taluk of Ariyalur district, Tamil Nadu, India.

== Demographics ==
As of 2001 census, Ottakoil had a total population of 3882 with 1913 males and 1969 females.
