= Kovil Esanai (East) =

Kovil Esanai Kovilesanai
- village
- Country: India
- State: Tamil Nadu
- District: Ariyalur

Population (2001)
  - Total: 2,049

Languages
  - Official: Tamil
- Time zone: UTC+5:30 (IST)
- PIN: 621851
- Telephone code: 04329
- Vehicle registration: TN-61
- Coastline: 0 kilometres (0 mi)
- Nearest city: Ariyalur
- Sex ratio: 1021 ♂/♀
- Literacy: 61.33%
- Lok Sabha constituency: Chidambaram
- Climate: Tropical wet (Köppen)
- Avg. summer temperature: 40 °C (104 °F)
- Avg. winter temperature: 15 °C (59 °F)

Kovil Esanai (East) is a village in the Ariyalur taluk of Ariyalur district, Tamil Nadu, India.

== Demographics ==
As of 2001 census, Kovil Esanai (East) had a total population of 2049 with 1014 males and 1035 females. The main occupation is agriculture. The local population have a variety of religious beliefs.
