= Mallur, Ariyalur =

Mallur
- village
- Country: India
- State: Tamil Nadu
- District: Ariyalur

Population (2001)
  - Total: 1,314

Languages
  - Official: Tamil
- Time zone: UTC+5:30 (IST)
- PIN: 621704
- Vehicle registration: TN-61
- Coastline: 0 kilometres (0 mi)
- Nearest city: ariyalur
- Sex ratio: 1018 ♂/♀
- Literacy: 59.09%
- Lok Sabha constituency: chidambaram

Mallur is a village in the Ariyalur taluk of Ariyalur district, Tamil Nadu, India.

== Demographics ==
As of 2001 census, Mallur had a total population of 1314 with 651 males and 663 females.
