= Venkatagiri sari =

Venkatagiri Saree
- Geographical indication
- Description: Warp and Weft/Jacquard weaving method of weaving a Saree
- Type: Handicraft
- Area: Venkatagiri, Tirupati district, Andhra Pradesh
- Country: India
- Material: Fabric: Zari; Dye

Venkatagiri Saree is a saree style woven in Venkatagiri of Tirupati district in the Indian state of Andhra Pradesh. It was registered as one of the geographical indication from Andhra Pradesh by Geographical Indications of Goods (Registration and Protection) Act, 1999. Venkatagiri sarees are known for their fine weaving. These style of sarees can also be found in the villages of Sengunthapuram, Variyankaval, Elaiyur, Kallathur, Andimadam and Marudhur villages.

== History ==
The history of the sari dates back to the early 1700s during the rule of Venkatagiri. They were encouraged by the Velugoti dynasty of Nellore and also by the Bobbili and Pithapuram dynasties. In those days, they were mostly weaved for queens, royal women and Zamindaris.

== Production and variety ==
The production of the Venkatagiri sari includes different stages which includes:

- Raw materials – such as cotton in hank form, silver and gold zari's and Naphthol and Vat dyes
- Cotton purification – This process involves boiling of hank cotton to remove certain impurities, soaked overnight, rinsed and made suitable for dyeing process.
- Dyeing – it involves bleaching technique for white saris and for colored ones, Vat and Naphthol dyes are used.
- Removal of excess dye – dyed or bleached yarn undergoes soaking in boiling water with some techniques to cut out excess dyeing.
- Drying – after the above process, the yarn in hank form is dried on bamboo sticks.
- Winding of hank yarn into warp and weft – charka, shift bamboo and bobbin are used to form warp. While, the weft is made with help of a pirn.
- Street sizing – the warp extension, spraying of rice conjee ensures suitable weaving followed by drying.
- Weaving process – involves Warp and Weft method of weaving and sometimes replaced by Jacquard weaving.
- Conception of Design – involves two kinds of process namely, Human element and Graph Paper Design
- Cutting & folding – woven cloth undergoes cutting per the goods demand
- Inspection of sarees – inspection by the master weaver to rectify flaws
- Marketing – showroom display for selling the sarees

The Venkatagiri sari has different varieties like, Venkatagiri 100, Venkatagiri-putta and Venkatagiri-silk, with the Venkatagiri 100 being popular of all. The saris are made from fine cotton and the most significant is the use of zari.

== Support ==
The power looms have effected the sari making by the local artisans. Department of Handicrafts under Ministry of Textiles (India) oversees the issues and promotes the artisans.

== See also ==
- List of Geographical Indications in India
