= Nagamangalam, Ariyalur district =

Nagamangalam
- village
- Country: India
- State: Tamil Nadu
- District: Ariyalur

Population (2001)
  - Total: 2,904

Languages
  - Official: Tamil
- Time zone: UTC+5:30 (IST)
- Postal code: 620012
- Vehicle registration: TN-
- Sex ratio: 935 ♂/♀
- Literacy: 61.43%

Nagamangalam is a village in the Ariyalur taluk of Ariyalur district, Tamil Nadu, India.

== Demographics ==
As per the 2001 census, Nagamangalam had a total population of 2904 with 1501 males and 1403 females.
