= Sannavur (South) =

- village
- Country: India
- State: Tamil Nadu
- District: Ariyalur

Population (2001)
  - Total: 1,733

Languages
  - Official: Tamil
- Time zone: UTC+5:30 (IST)
- PIN: 621651
- Vehicle registration: TN-
- Coastline: 0 kilometres (0 mi)
- Nearest city: Kallakkudi
- Sex ratio: 1066 ♂/♀
- Literacy: 56.61%
- Lok Sabha constituency: Chidambaram

Sannavur (South) is a village in the Ariyalur taluk of Ariyalur district, Tamil Nadu, India.

Sannavur Panchayat President election results:

- Election held on 13.10.2006
- Mrs. Chellammal Ganesan won and secured 1189 votes
- Mrs. Veerasamy secured 829 votes
- Mrs. Chinnamuthu secured 104 votes
- Not valid 156 votes
- Polled 2278 votes out of 2510 total votes.

== Demographics ==
As per the 2001 census, Sannavur (South) had a total population of 1733 with 839 males and 894 females.
