= Ayanathur =

- village
- Location in Tamil Nadu, India Ayanathur (India)
- Coordinates: 11°10′8″N 79°10′24″E
- Country: India
- State: Tamil Nadu
- District: Ariyalur

Population (2001)
  - Total: 1,462

Languages
  - Official: Tamil
- Time zone: UTC+5:30 (IST)
- Vehicle registration: TN-61
- Coastline: 0 kilometres (0 mi)
- Sex ratio: 1008 ♂/♀
- Literacy: 53.07%

Ayanathur is a village in the Ariyalur taluk of Ariyalur district, Tamil Nadu, India.

== Demographics ==
As of 2001 census, Ayanathur had a total population of 1462 with 728 males and 734 females.
