= Karuppilakattalai =

- village
- Country: India
- State: Tamil Nadu
- District: Ariyalur

Population (2001)
  - Total: 3,585

Languages
  - Official: Tamil
- Time zone: UTC+5:30 (IST)
- Vehicle registration: TN-
- Coastline: 0 kilometres (0 mi)
- Nearest city: Ariyalur
- Sex ratio: 1017 ♂/♀
- Literacy: 46.53%
- Lok Sabha constituency: Chidambaram

Karuppilakattalai is a village in the Ariyalur taluk of Ariyalur district, Tamil Nadu, India.

== Demographics ==
As of 2001 census, Karuppilakattalai had a total population of 3585 with 1777 males and 1808 females.
