= Karaiyavetti =

Coordinates: 10°58′N 79°03′E

- village
- Interactive map of Karaiyavetti
- Country: India
- State: Tamil Nadu
- District: Ariyalur

Population (2001)
  - Total: 2,933

Languages
  - Official: Tamil
- Time zone: UTC+5:30 (IST)
- Vehicle registration: TN-
- Coastline: 0 kilometres (0 mi)
- Sex ratio: 1005 ♂/♀
- Literacy: 59.73%

Karaiyavetti is a village in the Ariyalur taluk of Ariyalur district, Tamil Nadu, India.

== Demographics ==
As per the 2001 census, Karaiyavetti had a total population of 2933 with 1463 males and 1470 females.
