= Chinnapattakadu =

- village
- Location in Tamil Nadu, India Chinnapattakadu (India)
- Coordinates: 11°0′24″N 79°9′20″E
- Country: India
- State: Tamil Nadu
- District: Ariyalur

Population (2001)
  - Total: 2,417

Languages
  - Official: Tamil
- Time zone: UTC+5:30 (IST)
- Vehicle registration: TN-
- Coastline: 0 kilometres (0 mi)
- Sex ratio: 968 ♂/♀
- Literacy: 49.62%

Chinnapattakadu is a village in the Ariyalur taluk of Ariyalur district, Tamil Nadu, India. Chinnapattakadu is a small Village/hamlet in Thirumanur Block in Ariyalur District of Tamil Nadu State, India. It is located 24 km towards South from District headquarters Ariyalur. 15 km from Thirumanur. 304 km from State capital Chennai

== Demographics ==
As of 2001 census, Chinnapattakadu had a total population of 2417 with 1228 males and 1189 females.
