= Udayarpalayam R.F. =

Udayarpalayam R.F. is a village in Ariyalur district, Tamil Nadu, India. As of the 2011 Census of India, it has a population of 12,688, with 6,292 males and 6,396 females.
