= Vanjinapuram =

Coordinates: 11°17′N 79°10′E

- village
- Interactive map of Vanjinapuram
- Country: India
- State: Tamil Nadu
- District: Ariyalur

Population (2001)
  - Total: 2,798

Languages
  - Official: Tamil
- Time zone: UTC+5:30 (IST)
- Vehicle registration: TN-
- Coastline: 0 kilometres (0 mi)
- Sex ratio: 1012 ♂/♀
- Literacy: 56.98%

Vanjinapuram is a village in the Sendurai taluk of Ariyalur district, Tamil Nadu, India.

== Demographics ==
As per the 2001 census, Vanjinapuram had a total population of 2798 with 1391 males and 1407 females.
