= Authukurichi =

- village
- Location in Tamil Nadu, India Authukurichi (India)
- Coordinates: 11°24′37″N 79°21′4″E
- Country: India
- State: Tamil Nadu
- District: Ariyalur

Population (2001)
  - Total: 5,540

Languages
  - Official: Tamil
- Time zone: UTC+5:30 (IST)
- Vehicle registration: TN-
- Coastline: 0 kilometres (0 mi)
- Sex ratio: 1003 ♂/♀
- Literacy: 58.30%

Authukurichi is a village in the Udayarpalayam taluk of Ariyalur district, Tamil Nadu, India.

== Demographics ==
As per the 2001 census, Authukurichi had a total population of 5540 with 2766 males and 2774 females.
