= Annimangalam =

- village
- Location in Tamil Nadu, India Annimangalam (India)
- Coordinates: 10°55′43″N 79°4′5″E
- Country: India
- State: Tamil Nadu
- District: Ariyalur

Population (2001)
  - Total: 3,185

Languages
  - Official: Tamil
- Time zone: UTC+5:30 (IST)
- Vehicle registration: TN-
- Coastline: 0 kilometres (0 mi)
- Sex ratio: 1030 ♂/♀
- Literacy: 63.18%

Annimangalam is a village in the Ariyalur taluk of Ariyalur district, Tamil Nadu, India.

== Demographics ==
As of 2001 census, Annimangalam had a total population of 3185 with 1569 males and 1616 females. Annimangalam is the area with the most farmers in the Ariyalur Dist. Near the village is the Kollidam river. This village is famous for farming sugarcanes.
