= Keezhakavattankurichi =

Keezhakavattankurichi Keelakavattankurichi
- village
- Location in Tamil Nadu, India Keezhakavattankurichi (India)
- Coordinates: 10.957708°N 79.063836°E
- Country: India
- State: Tamil Nadu
- District: Ariyalur

Population (2001)
  - Total: 4,857

Languages
  - Official: Tamil
- Time zone: UTC+5:30 (IST)
- Vehicle registration: TN-
- Coastline: 0 kilometres (0 mi)
- Sex ratio: 1027 ♂/♀
- Literacy: 58.93%

Keezhakavattankurichi is a village in the Ariyalur taluk of Ariyalur district, Tamil Nadu, India.

== Demographics ==
As per the 2001 census, Keezhakavattankurichi had a total population of 4857 with 2396 males and 2461 females.
