= Pilakurichi =

- village
- Country: India
- State: Tamil Nadu
- District: Ariyalur

Population (2011)
  - Total: 3,942

Languages
  - Official: Tamil
- Time zone: UTC+5:30 (IST)
- Pincode: 621806
- Vehicle registration: TN-
- Coastline: 0 kilometres (0 mi)
- Sex ratio: 0.97♂/♀
- Literacy: 59.94%

Pilakurichi is a village in the Sendurai taluk of Ariyalur district, Tamil Nadu, India.

== Demographics ==
As per the 2011 census, Pilakurichi had a total population of 3942, with 1938 males and 2004 females.

== Geography ==
The village is surrounded by cashew nut trees.
