= Alathiyur, Ariyalur =

Alathiyur
- village
- Location in Tamil Nadu, India Alathiyur (India)
- Coordinates: 11°22′0″N 79°15′45″E
- Country: India
- State: Tamil Nadu
- District: Ariyalur
- Named for: RAMCO CEMENTS LTD

Population (2001)
  - Total: 4,012

Languages
  - Official: Tamil
- Time zone: UTC+5:30 (IST)
- Postal code: 621730
- Vehicle registration: TN-
- Coastline: 0 kilometres (0 mi)
- Sex ratio: 824 ♂/♀
- Literacy: 57.21%

Alathiyur is a village in the Sendurai taluk of Ariyalur district, Tamil Nadu, India.

== Demographics ==
As of 2001 census, Alathiyur had a total population of 4,012 with 2,199 males and 1,813 females.

== See also ==
- List of villages in Ariyalur district
