= Siluvaicheri =

Siluvaicheri Sivacheri
- village
- Country: India
- State: Tamil Nadu
- District: Ariyalur

Population (2001)
  - Total: 2,277

Languages
  - Official: Tamil
- Time zone: UTC+5:30 (IST)
- Vehicle registration: TN-61
- Coastline: 0 kilometres (0 mi)
- Nearest city: Andimadam
- Sex ratio: 1.008 ♂/♀
- Literacy: 54.65%

Siluvaicheri is a village near to Andimadam in the Udayarpalayam taluk of Ariyalur district, Tamil Nadu, India. Old name is Sivacheri, a Shiva lingam located in this village established by Sri Agathiyar.

== Demographics ==
As per the 2001 census, Siluvaicheri had a total population of 2277 with 1143 males and 1134 females.
