= Ayyappa Nayakan Pettai =

Ayyappa Nayakan Pettai (also called A.N.Pettai) is a village in Ariyalur district, Tamil Nadu, India.
