= Edaayankurichi =

- village
- Interactive map of Edaayankurichi
- Country: India
- State: Tamil Nadu
- District: Ariyalur

Population (2001)
  - Total: 4,015

Languages
  - Official: Tamil
- Time zone: UTC+5:30 (IST)
- Vehicle registration: TN-
- Coastline: 0 kilometres (0 mi)
- Sex ratio: 1008 ♂/♀
- Literacy: 58.23%

Edaayankurichi is a village in the Udayarpalayam taluk of Ariyalur district, Tamil Nadu, India.

== Demographics ==
As per the 2001 census, Edaayankurichi had a total population of 4015 with 2000 males and 2015 females.
