= Namangunam =

- village
- Interactive map of Namangunam
- Country: India
- State: Tamil Nadu
- District: Ariyalur

Population (2001)
  - Total: 3,446

Languages
  - Official: Tamil
- Time zone: UTC+5:30 (IST)
- Vehicle registration: TN-
- Coastline: 0 kilometres (0 mi)
- Sex ratio: 1048 ♂/♀
- Literacy: 54.01%

Namangunam is a village in the Sendurai taluk of Ariyalur district, Tamil Nadu, India.

== Demographics ==
As per the 2001 census, Namangunam had a total population of 3446 with 1683 males and 1763 females.
