= Anandavadi =

- village
- Location in Tamil Nadu, India Anandavadi (India)
- Coordinates: 11°11′21″N 79°11′27″E
- Country: India
- State: Tamil Nadu
- District: Ariyalur

Population (2001)
  - Total: 3,854

Languages
  - Official: Tamil
- Time zone: UTC+5:30 (IST)
- Vehicle registration: TN-
- Coastline: 0 kilometres (0 mi)
- Sex ratio: 1036 ♂/♀
- Literacy: 51.74%

Anandavadi is a village in the Sendurai taluk of Ariyalur district, Tamil Nadu, India. It is also an ashram in South India Anandavadi (Ashram)

== Demographics ==
As per the 2001 census, Anandavadi had a total population of 3854 with 1893 males and 1961 females.

== See also ==
- List of villages in Ariyalur district
