= Asaveerankudikkadu =

- village
- Location in Tamil Nadu, India Asaveerankudikkadu (India)
- Coordinates: 11°19′2″N 79°12′36″E
- Country: India
- State: Tamil Nadu
- District: Ariyalur

Population (2001)
  - Total: 3,474

Languages
  - Official: Tamil
- Time zone: UTC+5:30 (IST)
- Vehicle registration: TN-
- Coastline: 0 kilometres (0 mi)
- Sex ratio: 1030 ♂/♀
- Literacy: 67.29%

Asaveerankudikkadu is a village in the Sendurai taluk of Ariyalur district, Tamil Nadu, India.

== Demographics ==
As per the 2011 census, Asaveerankudikkadu had a total population of 3981 with 1988 males and 1993 females.
