= Kulamanickam (West) =

- village
- Country: India
- State: Tamil Nadu
- District: Ariyalur

Population (2001)
  - Total: 4,115

Languages
  - Official: Tamil
- Time zone: UTC+5:30 (IST)
- Vehicle registration: TN-
- Coastline: 0 kilometres (0 mi)
- Sex ratio: 1112 ♂/♀
- Literacy: 79.40%

Kulamanickam is a village in the Ariyalur taluk of Ariyalur district, Tamil Nadu, India.

The village on the northern bank of river Kollidam (Coleroon). There are two Elementary school ( U C School and St. Ignatius School) and one St. Ignatius High School which is noted for its high results in the SSLC Public Examinations.

Kulamanickam and Sembiyakudi are twin villages, which look like one big village. Both are separate Panjayats. So sometimes the village is called " Sembiyakudikulamanickam or Kulamanickamsembiyakudi"

== Demographics ==
As per the 2001 census, Kulamanickam (West) had a total population of 4115 with 1948 males and 2167 females.

== History ==
The name of the village "Kulamanickam" said to be nick name(Rajakula Manickam) of Raja Raja Chola, it should be a part of Chola Dynasty. The name of the village "Sembiakudi" originated from name of Sister of Raja Raja Chola, Her name said to be 'Sembian Maadevi".
