= Keelakolathur =

- village
- Country: India
- State: Tamil Nadu
- District: Ariyalur

Population (2001)
  - Total: 3,135

Languages
  - Official: Tamil
- Time zone: UTC+5:30 (IST)
- Vehicle registration: TN-
- Coastline: 0 kilometres (0 mi)
- Sex ratio: 1030 ♂/♀
- Literacy: 63.03%

Keelakolathur is a village in the Ariyalur taluk of Ariyalur district, Tamil Nadu, India.

Jallikattu (an event similar to bull fight) is conducted here during the Thaipoosam festival season, which occurs during the end of January. Many people from in and around Tamil Nadu state come here during this festival to visit the Jallikattu.

== Agriculture ==
As a part of Kaveri river passes the water to the village, people store the rain waters in lakes and ponds, which is helpful during the summer. People use the borewell water for irrigation and drinking. Agriculture is carried out in vast areas around this place. Rice, sugar cane, peanuts, sunflower and plantains are the major crops.

The climate is moderate with no extremes. There is frequent bus service from Thanjavur and Ariyalur. It has one Post office and few provisional stores to fulfil the peoples daily needs. There are some yearly festivals like Amman Thiruvizha, Theemithi Thiruvizha(fire walking) and Pongal.

== Demographics ==
As per the 2001 census, Keelakolathur had a total population of 3135 with 1544 males and 1591 females.
