= Udayavarthinayur =

- village
- Country: India
- State: Tamil Nadu
- District: Ariyalur

Population (2011)
  - Total: 2,392

Languages
  - Official: Tamil
- Time zone: UTC+5:30 (IST)
- Postal code: 621701
- Vehicle registration: TN-
- Coastline: 0 kilometres (0 mi)
- Sex ratio: 1.002 ♂/♀
- Literacy: 57.82%

Udayavarthinayur is a village in the Udayarpalayam taluk of Ariyalur district, Tamil Nadu, India.

== Demographics ==
As per the 2011 census, Udayavarthinayur had a total population of 2392 with 1163 males and 1229 females.
