= Keezhamaligai =

- village
- Country: India
- State: Tamil Nadu
- District: Ariyalur

Population (2001)
  - Total: 3,019

Languages
  - Official: Tamil
- Time zone: UTC+5:30 (IST)
- Vehicle registration: TN-
- Coastline: 0 kilometres (0 mi)
- Sex ratio: 1033 ♂/♀
- Literacy: 65.63%

Keezhamaligai is a village in the Sendurai taluk of Ariyalur district, Tamil Nadu, India.

== Demographics ==
As per the 2001 census, Keezhamaligai had a total population of 3,019 with 1,484 males and 1,534 females.
