= Adhanakurichi =

- village
- Location in Tamil Nadu, India Adhanakurichi (India)
- Coordinates: 11°21′16″N 79°14′58″E
- Country: India
- State: Tamil Nadu
- District: Ariyalur

Population (2001)
  - Total: 3,528

Languages
  - Official: Tamil
- Time zone: UTC+5:30 (IST)
- Vehicle registration: TN-
- Coastline: 0 kilometres (0 mi)
- Sex ratio: 958 ♂/♀
- Literacy: 53.61%

Adhanakurichi is a village in the Sendurai taluk of Ariyalur district, Tamil Nadu, India.

== Demographics ==
As per the 2001 census, Adhanakurichi had a total population of 3528 with 1802 males and 1726 females.

== See also ==
- List of villages in Ariyalur district
