= Kuzhavadaiyan =

- Village
- Location in Tamil Nadu, India Kuzhavadaiyan (India)
- Coordinates: 10°57′00″N 79°23′00″E
- Country: India
- State: Tamil Nadu
- Region: Chola Nadu
- District: Ariyalur
- Taluk: Udayarpalayam
- Established: 23-01-2013

Government
  - Type: Rural

Languages
  - Official: Tamil
- Time zone: UTC+5:30 (IST)
- Vehicle registration: TN-

Kuzhavadaiyan is a village in the Udayarpalayam taluk of Ariyalur district, Tamil Nadu, India.

== Location ==
Kuzhavadaiyan is located 255 km from Chennai. On the south it is around 30 km from Kumbakonam via Anaikkarai bridge. On the east it is 38 km from Ariyalur. On the north it is 25 km from Srimueshnam, and 36 km from Viruthachalam. On the east it is 50 km from Chidambaram.

== Demographics ==
As of the 2001 census of India, Jayankondam had a population of 31,268 comprising 15,532 males and 15,736 females, making the sex ratio (number of females per thousand males) of the town 1,013. A total of 3,716 people were under six years of age and the child sex ratio (number of females per thousand males under six years of age) stood at 1,003. The town had an average literacy of 77.18%, higher than the national average of 59.5%. A total of 5,544, comprising 20.12% of the population, belonged to Scheduled Castes (SC) and 549, comprising 1.99% of the population, belonged to Scheduled tribes (ST). There were a total of 7,022 households in the town. As of 2001, Jayankondam had a total of 9,694 main workers: 967 cultivators, 1,361 agricultural labourers, 1,867 in household industries and 5,499 other workers. There was a total of 1,938 marginal workers: 136 marginal cultivators, 1,068 marginal agricultural labourers, 196 marginal workers in household industries and 538 other marginal workers.

== Places near Kuzhavadaiyan ==
Gangaikonda Cholapuram temple is the place around 10 km. North from JKM is the ancient temple and built by Rajendra chozha having very ancient – oldest sculpture and drowning.

Anaikarai Bridge is 2.5 km from Kuzhavadaiyan.

== College ==
- Indra College, Kuzhavadaiyan

== Schools ==
- Gokilambal group of schools
- Gokilambal matriculation school
- Gokilambal International school (CBSE)
- Gokilambal NEET Academy
- Indra Public School, Kuzhavadaiyan
- panjayath union middil school

== Hospitals ==
S.No.	Doctors	Specialist	Address	Contact
1.	Fathima Hospital	Private	T Palur Road, Velayudha Nagar, Jayankondam 621802	(04331) 250033
2.	Mangalam Hospital	Private	Sannathi Street, Trichy Chidambaram Road, Jayankondam 621802	(04331) 250357
3.	Shanmugam Hospital	Private	Jayankondam Main Road, Viruthasalam Road, Jayankondam 621802	(04331) 250403
4.	Nava Jeevan Hospital	Private	11, Jubilee Road, Jayankondam 621802	(04331) 251160
5.	Prasad Surgical Care Hospital	Private	34-A, West Vellalar Street, Jayankondam 621802	(04331) 251711
6.	Jayankondam Government Hospital	Government	Sannathi Street, Trichy Chidambaram Road, Jayankondam 621802	(04331) 250256
