= Pudukkottai Village =

- village
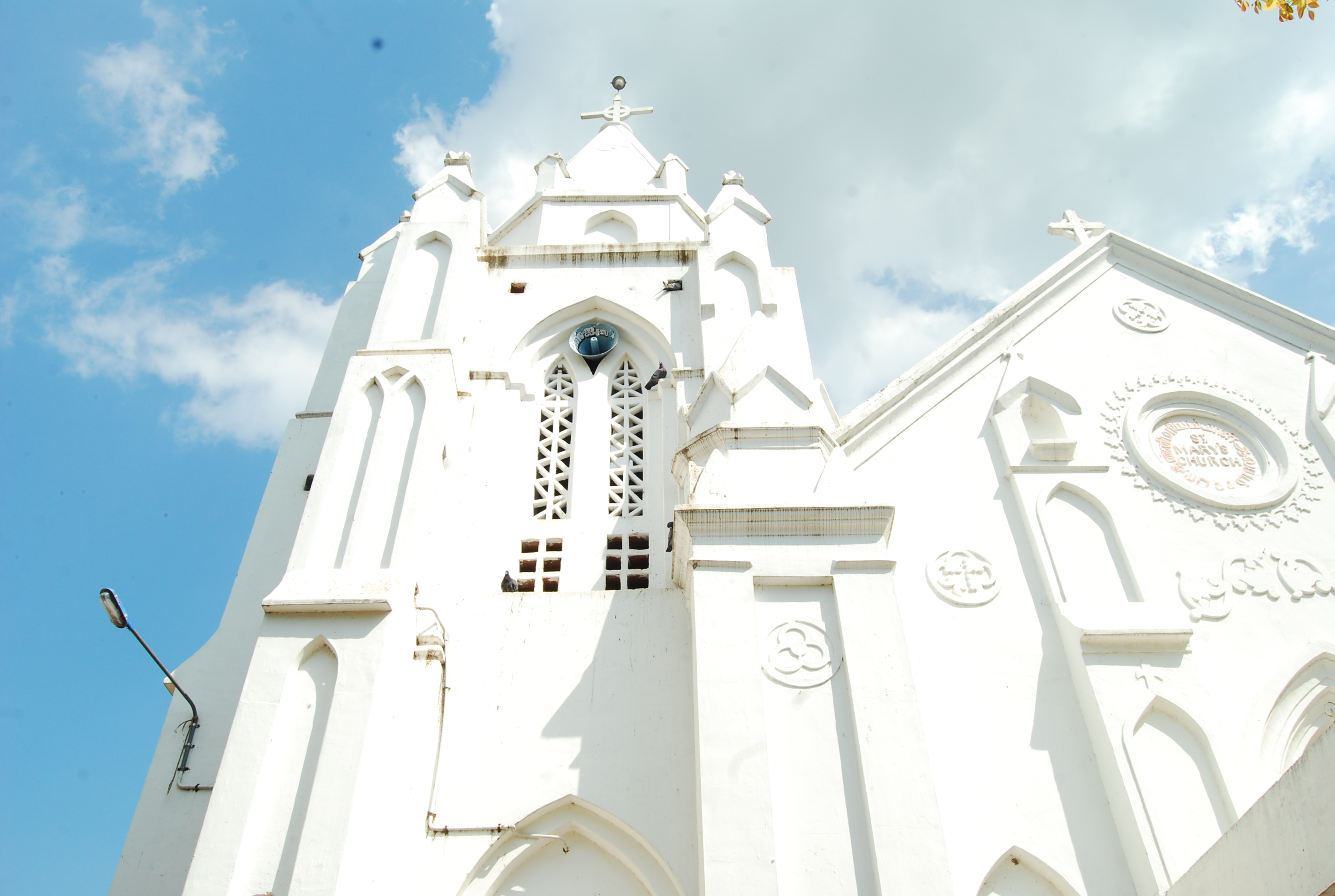
- CSI St.Mary's Church at Pudukkottai Village
- Nickname: Prestine Fort(Newfort)
- Location in Tamil Nadu, India Pudukkottai Village (India)
- Coordinates: 10.894546°N 79.036429°E
- Country: India
- State: Tamil Nadu
- Zone: Central
- Region: Ariyalur
- District: Ariyalur
- Taluk: Ariyalur
- Panchayat Union: Thirumanur

Government
  - Type: Village Panchayat
  - Body: Tamil Nadu State Government

Area
  - Total: 2.61 km^{2} (1.01 sq mi)

Population (2001)
  - Total: 1,858
  - Density: 712/km^{2} (1,840/sq mi)

Languages
  - Official: Tamil
- Time zone: UTC+5:30 (IST)
- PIN: 621851
- Telephone code: 04329 243***
- Vehicle registration: TN-61 ****
- TN Legislative Assembly Constituency: Ariyalur
- Nearest Railway Station: Pullambadi(14KM), Ariyalur(35KM)
- Nearest Railway Junction: Tiruchirappalli(47KM)
- Nearest Airport: Tiruchirappalli(47KM)
- Sex ratio: 1876 ♂/♀
- Literacy: 93.67%
- Lok Sabha constituency: Chidambaram
- Climate: Normal (Köppen)

Pudukkottai is a village in the Ariyalur taluk of Ariyalur district, Tamil Nadu, India. It had a population of 1856 in 2001. It is close to the border with Tiruchirapplli District and Thanjavur District.

Pudukkottai Village is administered by a Village Panchayat established in 1947. As of 2011, the village covered an area of 2.62 km^{2} (1.01 mi^{2}) and had a population of 2,902. Pudukkottai Village comes under the Ariyalur assembly constituency which elects a member to the Tamil Nadu Legislative Assembly once every five years and it is a part of the Chidambaram constituency which elects its Member of Parliament (MP) once in five years.

== Demographics ==
As per the 2001 census, Pudukkottai had a total population of 1858 with 895 males and 963 females.

Climate data for Pudukkottai Village
Month	Jan	Feb	Mar	Apr	May	Jun	Jul	Aug	Sep	Oct	Nov	Dec	Year
Mean daily maximum °C (°F)	30.1 (86.2)	32.6 (90.7)	35.1 (95.2)	36.9 (98.4)	37.4 (99.3)	36.7 (98.1)	35.7 (96.3)	35.4 (95.7)	24.5 (76.1)	32.2 (90.0)	30.1 (86.2)	29.2 (84.6)	33.8 (92.8)
Mean daily minimum °C (°F)	20.3 (68.5)	20.9 (69.6)	23.0 (73.4)	25.8 (78.4)	26.4 (79.5)	26.5 (79.7)	25.9 (78.6)	25.5 (77.9)	24.7 (76.5)	23.9 (75.0)	22.7 (72.9)	21.2 (70.2)	23.9 (75.0)
Average precipitation mm (inches)	14.3 (0.56)	5.4 (0.21)	9.5 (0.37)	50.5 (1.99)	65.2 (2.57)	34.9 (1.37)	60.6 (2.39)	85.5 (3.37)	146.6 (5.77)	191.5 (7.54)	131.8 (5.19)	84.4 (3.32)	880.2 (34.65)
Source: IMD

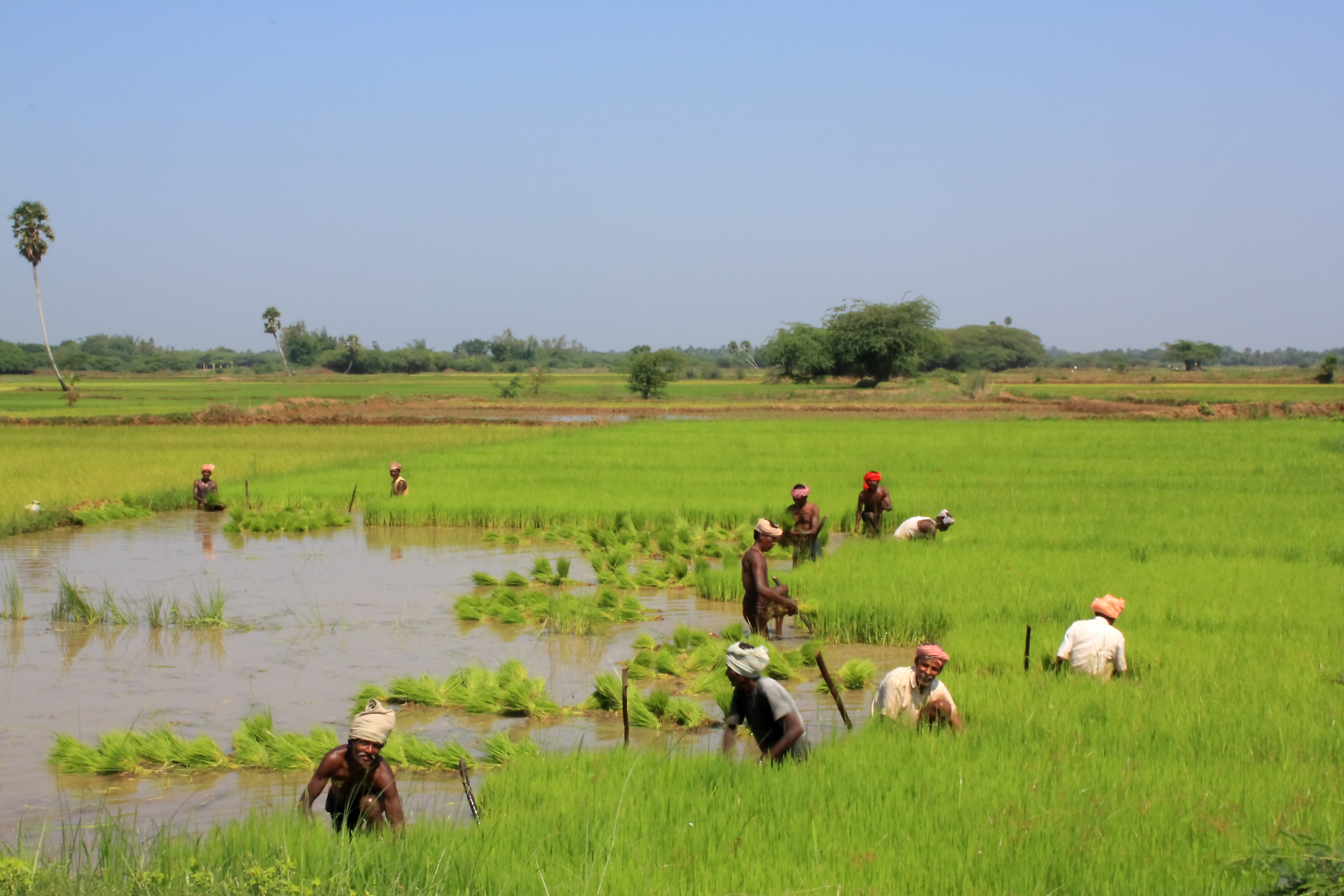
Paddy field in Pudukkottai Village
