= Nagalkuzhi =

- village
- Country: India
- State: Tamil Nadu
- District: Ariyalur

Government
  - Type: Panchayati raj (India)
  - Body: Gram panchayat
- Elevation: 150 m (490 ft)

Population (2001)
  - Total: 3,379

Languages
  - Official: Tamil
- Time zone: UTC+5:30 (IST)
- PIN: 621806
- Vehicle registration: TN-61
- Coastline: 0 kilometres (0 mi)
- Nearest city: jayankondam
- Sex ratio: 1042 ♂/♀
- Literacy: 65.30%

Nagalkuzhi is a village in the Sendurai taluk of Ariyalur district, Tamil Nadu, India. A 19th-century Sivan temple is located in the village.

== Demographics ==
As per the 2001 census, Nagalkuzhi had a total population of 3379 with 1655 males and 1724 females.
