= Paranam, Ariyalur =

Coordinates: 11°11′N 79°15′E

Paranam
- village
- Interactive map of Paranam
- Country: India
- State: Tamil Nadu
- District: Ariyalur

Population (2011)
  - Total: 4,844

Languages
  - Official: Tamil
- Time zone: UTC+5:30 (IST)
- Postal code: 621804
- Vehicle registration: TN-61
- Coastline: 0 kilometres (0 mi)
- Sex ratio: 1073 ♂/♀
- Literacy: 66.69%

Paranam is a large village located in the Sendurai taluk of Ariyalur district, Tamil Nadu, India.

== Demographics ==
As of 2011 census, Paranam had a total population of 4,844 with 2,337 males and 2,507 females.
