= Sirukadambur =

Coordinates: 12°16′N 79°25′E

- Village
- Interactive map of Sirukadambur
- Country: India
- State: Tamil Nadu
- District: Ariyalur

Population (2011)
  - Total: 3,225

Languages
  - Official: Tamil
- Time zone: UTC+5:30 (IST)
- Vehicle registration: TN-
- Coastline: 0 kilometres (0 mi)
- Sex ratio: 1074 ♂/♀
- Literacy: 66.93%

Sirukadambur is a village in the Sendurai taluk of Ariyalur district, Tamil Nadu, India.

== Demographics ==
As per the 2011 census, Sirukadambur had a total population of 3225 with 1586 males and 1669 females.
