= Sirkalathur =

Sirukalathur
- village
- Country: India
- State: Tamil Nadu
- District: Ariyalur

Population (2001)
  - Total: 3,617

Languages
  - Official: Tamil
- Time zone: UTC+5:30 (IST)
- PIN: 621710
- Vehicle registration: TN-61
- Coastline: 0 kilometres (0 mi)
- Nearest city: Jayankondam, Sendurai
- Sex ratio: 991 ♂/♀
- Literacy: 68.22%
- Climate: HOT (Köppen)

Sirukalathur is a village in the Sendurai taluk of Ariyalur district, Tamil Nadu, in India.

== Demographics ==
As per the 2001 census, Sirkalathur had a total population of 3617 with 1817 males and 1800 females.
