= Olaiyur =

- village
- Location in Tamil Nadu, India Olaiyur (India)
- Coordinates: 10.78°N 78.68°E
- Country: India
- State: Tamil Nadu
- District: Ariyalur

Population (2001)
  - Total: 2,717

Languages
  - Official: Tamil
- Time zone: UTC+5:30 (IST)
- PIN: 608901
- Vehicle registration: TN-
- Nearest city: Vriddhachalam
- Sex ratio: 1002 ♂/♀
- Literacy: 65.00%
- Avg. summer temperature: 38–22 °C (100–72 °F)
- Avg. winter temperature: 30–17 °C (86–63 °F)

Olaiyur is a Village Panchayat at Udayarpalayam taluk of Ariyalur district, Tamil Nadu, India.

== Geography ==
Olaiyur is located at Ariyalur District. It has an average elevation of 45 m (148 ft).

== Demographics ==
As per the 2001 census, Olaiyur had a total population of 2717 with 1357 males and 1360 females.

== Climate ==
The climate is cool and hot, rainy during September–November. Temperatures during the summer reach maximum 38 and minimum of 22 degrees Celsius. Winter temperatures range between 30 and 17 degrees Celsius.

== Occupation ==
More than 90% people are depending on Agriculture directly or indirectly. Olaiyur is a major sugarcane producing village in the district.

This village has excellent literacy rate. Cashew nuts are a major product after sugarcane.

== Education ==
This village hosts a Government Higher Education School, which is one of the primitive school in the locality. Now there are 3 schools in the village.

== Facilities ==
The village hosts a post office, TNEB Sub Station but lacks a primary health centre.
