= Tular, Ariyalur =

Tular
- village
- Country: India
- State: Tamil Nadu
- District: Ariyalur

Population (2001)
  - Total: 2,456

Languages
  - Official: Tamil
- Time zone: UTC+5:30 (IST)
- PIN: 621719
- Vehicle registration: TN-
- Coastline: 0 kilometres (0 mi)
- Sex ratio: 1008 ♂/♀
- Literacy: 64.44%

Tular is a village in the Sendurai taluk of Ariyalur district, Tamil Nadu, India.

== Demographics ==
As of 2001 census, Tular had a total population of 2,456 with 1,223 males and 1,233 females.
