= Manakkudaiyan =

Coordinates: 11°20′N 79°14′E

Manakkudaiyan Panchayarth
- Village
- Interactive map of Manakkudaiyan
- Country: India
- State: Tamil Nadu
- District: Ariyalur

Population (2001)
  - Total: 3,290

Languages
  - Official: Tamil
- Time zone: UTC+5:30 (IST)
- Vehicle registration: TN-
- Coastline: 0 kilometres (0 mi)
- Sex ratio: 1038 ♂/♀
- Literacy: 50.79%

Manakkudaiyan is a village in the Sendurai taluk of Ariyalur district, Tamil Nadu, India.

== Demographics ==
As of 2001 census, Manakkudaiyan had a total population of 3290 with 1614 males and 1676 females.
