= Thirukalappur =

Thirukkalappur
- village
- Location in Tamil Nadu, India Thirukkalappur (India)
- Coordinates: 11°18′53.39″N 79°26′13.75″E
- Country: India
- State: Tamil Nadu
- District: Ariyalur

Population (2001)
  - Total: 4,785

Languages
  - Official: Tamil
- Time zone: UTC+5:30 (IST)
- Vehicle registration: TN-
- Coastline: 0 kilometres (0 mi)
- Sex ratio: 1.014 ♂/♀
- Literacy: 68.45%

Thirukkalappur is a village in the Udayarpalayam taluk of Ariyalur district, Tamil Nadu, India.

== Demographics ==
As per the 2001 census, Thirukalappur had a total population of 4785 with 2409 males and 2376 females.
