= Palinganatham =

- village
- Location in Tamil Nadu, India Palinganatham (India)
- Coordinates: 10.958509°N 78.973392°E
- Country: India
- State: Tamil Nadu
- District: Ariyalur

Population (2001)
  - Total: 3,955

Languages
  - Official: Tamil
- Time zone: UTC+5:30 (IST)
- Vehicle registration: TN-
- Coastline: 0 kilometres (0 mi)
- Sex ratio: 1009 ♂/♀
- Literacy: 83.60%

Palinganatham is a village in the Ariyalur taluk of Ariyalur district, Tamil Nadu, India.

== Demographics ==
As of 2001 census, Palinganatham-621651 had a total population of 3955 with 1969 males and 1986 females.
