= Sriraman, Ariyalur =

Coordinates: 11°24′N 79°23′E

Sriraman
- village
- Interactive map of Sriraman
- Country: India
- State: Tamil Nadu
- District: Ariyalur

Population (2001)
  - Total: 1,431

Languages
  - Official: Tamil
- Time zone: UTC+5:30 (IST)
- Postal code: 608703
- Vehicle registration: TN-61
- Coastline: 0 kilometres (0 mi)
- Sex ratio: 999 ♂/♀
- Literacy: 62.67%

Sriraman is a village in the Andimadam taluk of Ariyalur district, Tamil Nadu, India.

== Demographics ==
As of 2001 census, Sriraman had a total population of 1431 with 716 males and 715 females.
