= Keelakudiyiruppu =

- village
- Country: India
- State: Tamil Nadu
- District: Ariyalur

Population (2001)
  - Total: 3,979

Languages
  - Official: Tamil
- Time zone: UTC+5:30 (IST)
- Vehicle registration: TN-
- Coastline: 0 kilometres (0 mi)
- Sex ratio: 1034 ♂/♀
- Literacy: 73.38%

Keelakudiyiruppu is a village in the Udayarpalayam taluk of Ariyalur district, Tamil Nadu, India.

== Demographics ==
As per the 2001 census, Keelakudiyiruppu had a total population of 3979 with 1956 males and 2023 females.
