= Ayanathathanur =

Ayanathathanur Vangaram Mullaiyur
- village
- Location in Tamil Nadu, India Ayanathathanur (India)
- Coordinates: 11°20′2″N 79°11′16″E
- Country: India
- State: Tamil Nadu
- District: Ariyalur

Population (2001)
  - Total: 3,411

Languages
  - Official: Tamil
- Time zone: UTC+5:30 (IST)
- PIN: 621709
- Telephone code: 9443838328; 9943287579; 9626374900
- Vehicle registration: TN-45
- Coastline: 0 kilometres (0 mi)
- Nearest city: Sendurai
- Sex ratio: 951 ♂/♀
- Literacy: 49.85%
- Lok Sabha constituency: Chidambaram

Ayanathathanur is a village located in the Sendurai taluk of Ariyalur district, Tamil Nadu, India.

== Demographics ==
As per the 2001 census, Ayanathathanur had a total population of 3411 with 1748 males and 1663 females.
