= Papanacheri =

- village
- Location in Tamil Nadu, India Papanacheri (India)
- Coordinates: 11.083322°N 79.050479°E
- Country: India
- State: Tamil Nadu
- District: Ariyalur

Population (2001)
  - Total: 1,199

Languages
  - Official: Tamil
- Time zone: UTC+5:30 (IST)
- Vehicle registration: TN-
- Coastline: 0 kilometres (0 mi)
- Sex ratio: 1046 ♂/♀
- Literacy: 57.54%

Papanacheri is a village in the Ariyalur taluk of Ariyalur district, Tamil Nadu, India.

== Demographics ==
As per the 2001 census, Papanacheri had a total population of 1199 with 586 males and 613 females.
