= Thalavoi (North) =

- village
- Country: India
- State: Tamil Nadu
- District: Ariyalur

Population (2001)
  - Total: 2,426

Languages
  - Official: Tamil
- Time zone: UTC+5:30 (IST)
- Vehicle registration: TN-
- Coastline: 0 kilometres (0 mi)
- Sex ratio: 1065 ♂/♀
- Literacy: 53.71%

Thalavoi (North) is a village in the Sendurai taluk of Ariyalur district, Tamil Nadu, India.

== Demographics ==
As per the 2001 census, Thalavoi (North) had a total population of 2426 with 1175 males and 1251 females.
