= Ayansuthamalli =

- village
- Location in Tamil Nadu, India Ayansuthamalli (India)
- Coordinates: 11°0′16″N 79°2′37″E
- Country: India
- State: Tamil Nadu
- District: Ariyalur

Population (2001)
  - Total: 1,610

Languages
  - Official: Tamil
- Time zone: UTC+5:30 (IST)
- Postal code: 621707
- Vehicle registration: TN-61
- Coastline: 0 kilometres (0 mi)
- Sex ratio: 926 ♂/♀
- Literacy: 53.29%

Ayansuthamalli is a village in the Ariyalur taluk of Ariyalur district, Tamil Nadu, India.

== Demographics ==
As of 2001 census, Avansuthamalli had a total population of 1610 with 836 males and 774 females.
