= Kulumur =

Coordinates: 11°19′N 79°09′E

Kulumur coorma nathi
- village
- Interactive map of Kulumur
- Country: India
- State: Tamil Nadu
- District: Ariyalur

Population (2001)
  - Total: 4,748

Languages
  - Official: Tamil
- Time zone: UTC+5:30 (IST)
- Vehicle registration: TN-61
- Coastline: 0 kilometres (0 mi)
- Nearest city: Sendurai
- Sex ratio: 52:48 ♂/♀
- Literacy: 64.75%

Kulumur is a village in the Sendurai taluk of Ariyalur district, Tamil Nadu, India.

== Demographics ==
As per the 2001 census, Kulumur had a total population of 5028 with 2452 males and 2296 females.
