= Anaikudam =

- village
- Location in Tamil Nadu, India Anaikudam (India)
- Coordinates: 11°8′5″N 79°22′37″E
- Country: India
- State: Tamil Nadu
- District: Ariyalur

Population (2001)
  - Total: 4,182

Languages
  - Official: Tamil
- Time zone: UTC+5:30 (IST)
- Vehicle registration: TN-
- Coastline: 0 kilometres (0 mi)
- Sex ratio: 955 ♂/♀
- Literacy: 63.34%

Anaikudam is a village in the Udayarpalayam Taluk of Ariyalur district, Tamil Nadu, India.

== Demographics ==
As per the 2001 census, Anaikudam had a total population of 4182 with 2139 males and 2043 females.

== See also ==
- List of villages in Ariyalur district
