= Udayanatham (West) =

- village
- Country: India
- State: Tamil Nadu
- District: Ariyalur

Population (2001)
  - Total: 3,868

Languages
  - Official: Tamil
- Time zone: UTC+5:30 (IST)
- Postal code: 612 902
- Vehicle registration: TN-
- Coastline: 0 kilometres (0 mi)
- Sex ratio: 997 ♂/♀
- Literacy: 68.90%
- Lok Sabha constituency: Chidambaram

Udayanatham (West) is a village in the Udayarpalayam taluk of Ariyalur district, Tamil Nadu, India.

== Demographics ==
As per the 2001 census, Udayanatham (West) had a total population of 3868 with 1937 males and 1931 females.
