= Melapalur =

Kelaiyur Melapalur
- Village
- Country: India
- State: Tamil Nadu
- District: Ariyalur

Population (2001)
  - Total: 973

Languages
  - Official: Tamil
- Time zone: UTC+5:30 (IST)
- Vehicle registration: TN-61
- Coastline: 0 kilometres (0 mi)
- Sex ratio: 994 ♂/♀
- Literacy: 64.12%

Melapalur is a village in the Ariyalur taluk of Ariyalur district, Tamil Nadu, India. Melapalur is located 15 k.m west from the District headquarters Ariyalur.

== Demographics ==
As per the 2001 census, Melapalur had a total population of 2000 with 1100 males and 900 females. According to Census 2011 information the location code or village code of Melapalur village is 636480. Melapalur village is located in Ariyalur Tehsil of Ariyalur district in Tamil Nadu, India. It is situated 15 k.m away from Ariyalur, which is both district & sub-district headquarter of Melapalur village. As per 2009 stats, Melapalur village is also a gram panchayat.

The total geographical area of village is 409.38 hectares. Melapalur has a total population of 1,003 peoples. There are about 274 houses in Melapalur village. As per 2019 stats, Melapalur villages comes under Ariyalur assembly & Chidambaram parliamentary constituency. Ariyalur is nearest town to Melapalur.
