= Ammbappur =

Ambapur
- village
- Location in Tamil Nadu, India Ambapur (India)
- Coordinates: 11°5′29″N 79°14′45″E
- Country: India
- State: Tamil Nadu
- District: Ariyalur

Population (2001)
  - Total: 3,029

Languages
  - Official: Tamil
- Time zone: UTC+5:30 (IST)
- Vehicle registration: TN-
- Coastline: 0 kilometres (0 mi)
- Sex ratio: 978 ♂/♀
- Literacy: 60.55%

Ambapur is a village in the Ariyalur Taluk of Ariyalur district, Tamil Nadu, India.

== Demographics ==
As of 2001 census, Ambapur had a total population of 3029 with 1531 males and 1498 females. Ambapur is one of the largest Panchayat in T Palur Block of Ariyalur District. Ambapur Panchayat comprises following villages:

- Ambapur
- Vikkiramangalam
- Senguzhi
- Ambalavarkattalai
- Udayar Theeyanur
- Perumal Theeyanur
- Malaimedu
- settythirukonam
- mazhavayanallur

Ambapur Panchayat has many heritage buildings more than 200 years old, such as Budha Mahadeva Statue, Vikkiramanagalam Sivan Temple (1100 years old), and Udayar Theeyanur Sivan Temple (1100 years old).

It also has one of the biggest forest in the district owned and maintained by Tamil Nadu Forest Department. They cultivate mainly Cashew trees spread over hundreds of acres.

In Ambapur Panchayat many Government offices are available such as postal office, Vikiramanagalam police station, telephone exchange office, government higher secondary school, primary health centre, animal husbandry hospital, co-operative society bank, part-time library, Anganwadi school.

Geographically Vikkiramangalam is located at the centre of nearby villages hence it is developing very fast with additional amenities like petrol pumps, gas stations are also being set up shortly.

Ariyalur to Kumbakonam shortest way is via Vikkiramanglam.

== See also ==
- List of villages in Ariyalur district
