= Thathanur (West) =

- village
- Country: India
- State: Tamil Nadu
- District: Ariyalur

Population (2001)
  - Total: 4,057

Languages
  - Official: Tamil
- Time zone: UTC+5:30 (IST)
- PIN: 621804
- Vehicle registration: TN-
- Coastline: 0 kilometres (0 mi)
- Sex ratio: 1026 ♂/♀
- Literacy: 60.55%

Thathanur (West) is a village in the Udayarpalayam taluk of Ariyalur district, Tamil Nadu, India.

== Demographics ==
As per the 2001 census, Thathanur (West) had a total population of 4057 with 2002 males and 2055 females.
