= Sripurandan (South) =

- village
- Country: India
- State: Tamil Nadu
- District: Ariyalur

Population (2001)
  - Total: 2,214

Languages
  - Official: Tamil
- Time zone: UTC+5:30 (IST)
- Vehicle registration: TN-
- Coastline: 0 kilometres (0 mi)
- Sex ratio: 979 ♂/♀
- Literacy: 53.35%

Sripurandan (South) is a village in the Udayarpalayam taluk of Ariyalur district, Tamil Nadu, India.

== Demographics ==
As per the 2001 census, Sripurandan (South) had a total population of 2214 with 1119 males and 1095 females.
