= Nallampalayam =

Nallampalayam is a Panchayat Village in Sendurai Taluk, Ariyalur district, Tamil Nadu, South India, 23 km from Ariyalur Town and 3 km from Sendurai.
