= Parukkal (West) =

- village
- Country: India
- State: Tamil Nadu
- District: Ariyalur

Population (2001)
  - Total: 2,141

Languages
  - Official: Tamil
- Time zone: UTC+5:30 (IST)
- Postal code: 621804
- Vehicle registration: TN-
- Coastline: 0 kilometres (0 mi)
- Sex ratio: 1041 ♂/♀
- Literacy: 63.32%

Parukkal is a village in the Udayarpalayam taluk of Ariyalur district, Tamil Nadu, India.

== Demographics ==
As per the 2001 census, suthamalli had a total population of 2141 with 1049 males and 1092 females.
