= Sathamangalam =

- village
- Country: India
- State: Tamil Nadu
- District: Ariyalur

Population (2001)
  - Total: 2,718

Languages
  - Official: Tamil
- Time zone: UTC+5:30 (IST)
- Vehicle registration: TN-
- Coastline: 0 kilometres (0 mi)
- Nearest city: ARIYALUR, THANJAVUR
- Sex ratio: 955 ♂/♀
- Literacy: 55.43%

Sathamangalam is a village in the Ariyalur taluk of Ariyalur district, Tamil Nadu, India.

== Demographics ==
As of 2001 census, Sathamangalam had a total population of 2718 with 1390 males and 1328 females.
