= Thuthur =

Thuthur Boobala Samuththiram
- Village
- Country: India
- State: Tamil Nadu
- District: Ariyalur

Population (2011)
  - Total: 1,717

Languages
  - Official: Tamil
- Time zone: UTC+5:30 (IST)
- PIN: 621701
- Telephone code: 04329
- Vehicle registration: TN-45
- Nearest city: Tiruchirappalli
- Sex ratio: 1045 ♂/♀
- Literacy: 50.92%
- Lok Sabha constituency: Perambalur

Thuthur is a village in the Ariyalur taluk of Ariyalur district, Tamil Nadu, India.

== Demographics ==
The 2001 census reported that Thuthur had a population of 2,787 with 1,363 males and 1,424 females. By 2011, the population dropped to 1,717 with 840 males and 877 females.

== Economy ==
Agriculture is the main activity of Thuthur with rice and sugarcane the major crops.

== Transport ==
- By Air - Tiruchirappalli airport is around 90 km from Thuthur.
- By Rail - Ariyalur railway junction is 30 km from Thuthur.
- By Road - Thuthur is well connected with all the major towns nearby, as well as towns like Ariyalur and Thanjavur.

== Education and other services ==
Thuthur has two schools. The Government High School is located in south west of the village and the Welfare Department Primary school in the south east. The main police station is located near to the school. A famous historical Shiva temple is located in the north eastern side of the village in Agraharam Street. It is believed to have been built in the time of King Rajendra Chola I. On the west side of Agraharam Street is the Perumal temple. The Mariamman and Dhorwpadhi Amman temples are on the north bank of a huge lake called Veteri. The village has a post office.

Thuthur is surrounded by neighboring villages. In the west are Kuruvadi and Koman; in the north Gunamangalam and Arakattalai; in the east Vaipur; in the northeast Muttuvancheri; in the south east Edakudi; and in the south Maniayar Vaalkai.

Three main river pass Thuthur, namely Kollidam River, Ponnaru and Marudhaiaaru.
