= Elandakudam =

Elandaikudam ilandakudam Elandaikudam
- Village
- Interactive map of Elandaikudam
- Coordinates: 10.9278°N 79.0333°E
- Country: India
- State: Tamil Nadu
- District: Ariyalur

Population (2011)https://www.tnrd.tn.gov.in/databases/census_of_india_2011TN/pdf/21-Ariyalur.pdf
  - Total: 4,559

Languages
  - Official: Tamil
- Time zone: UTC+5:30 (IST)
- PIN: 621851
- Vehicle registration: TN-
- Coastline: 0 kilometres (0 mi)
- Nearest city: Ariyalur
- Sex ratio: 1069 ♂/♀
- Literacy: 67.55%

Elandaikudam is a village in the Ariyalur taluk of Ariyalur district, Tamil Nadu, India.

== Facilities ==
Elandaikudam comes under the control of Venganoor police station.

== Economy ==
Agriculture is the main source of people for those who are depending on Elandaikudam. Nearly 25 hectares are active with the help of few big lakes like Oor Yeri, Big Yeri, and Ponnapudaiyan Yeri.

The farmers are purely accessing the co-operative bank to get agriculture loan and other personal loans.

== Education ==
The village has a higher secondary school, co-operative bank. Students are daily travelling to Trichy, Ariyalur and Tanjore for earning the basic degrees.

== Adjacent communities ==
Adjacent communities:
