= Kilimangalam =

- village
- Country: India
- State: Tamil Nadu
- District: Ariyalur

Population (2001)
  - Total: 2,497

Languages
  - Official: Tamil
- Time zone: UTC+5:30 (IST)
- Vehicle registration: TN-
- Coastline: 0 kilometres (0 mi)
- Sex ratio: 999 ♂/♀
- Literacy: 55.40%

Kilimangalam is a village in the Tittakudi Taluk of Cuddalore district, Tamil Nadu, India.

== Demographics ==
As per the 2001 census, Kilimangalam had a total population of 2497 with 1249 males and 1248 females.
