= Varanavasi =

Coordinates: 12°50′N 79°53′E

- village
- Interactive map of Varanavasi
- Country: India
- State: Tamil Nadu
- District: Ariyalur

Population (2001)
  - Total: 4,051

Languages
  - Official: Tamil
- Time zone: UTC+5:30 (IST)
- Vehicle registration: TN-
- Coastline: 0 kilometres (0 mi)
- Sex ratio: 1037 ♂/♀
- Literacy: 58.56%

Varanavasi is a village in the Ariyalur taluk of Ariyalur district, Tamil Nadu, India.

== Demographics ==
As of 2001 census, Varanavasi had a total population of 4,051 with 1,989 males and 2,062 females.
