= Kandiratheertham =

Kandarathitham
- village
- Location in Tamil Nadu, India
- Coordinates: 10.906099°N 79.040493°E
- Country: India
- State: Tamil Nadu
- District: Ariyalur

Population (2001)
  - Total: 3,798

Languages
  - Official: Tamil
- Time zone: UTC+5:30 (IST)
- Vehicle registration: TN-
- Coastline: 0 kilometres (0 mi)
- Sex ratio: 1102 ♂/♀
- Literacy: 73.78%

Kandarathitham is a village in the Ariyalur taluk of Ariyalur district, Tamil Nadu, India.

== Demographics ==
As of 2001 census, Kandarathitham had a total population of 3798 with 1807 males and 1991 females. It is famous for its antique temples.
