= Sannavur (North) =

சன்னாவூர் வடக்கு Sannavur (North)
- village
- Country: India
- State: Tamil Nadu
- District: Ariyalur

Population (2001)
  - Total: 1,497

Languages
  - Official: Tamil
- Time zone: UTC+5:30 (IST)
- Vehicle registration: TN-
- Coastline: 0 kilometres (0 mi)
- Sex ratio: 1053 ♂/♀
- Literacy: 50.92%

Sannavur (North) is a village in the Ariyalur taluk of Ariyalur district, Tamil Nadu, India.

== Demographics ==
As of 2001 census, Sannavur (North) had a total population of 1497 with 729 males and 768 females.
