= Thirumanur =

- village
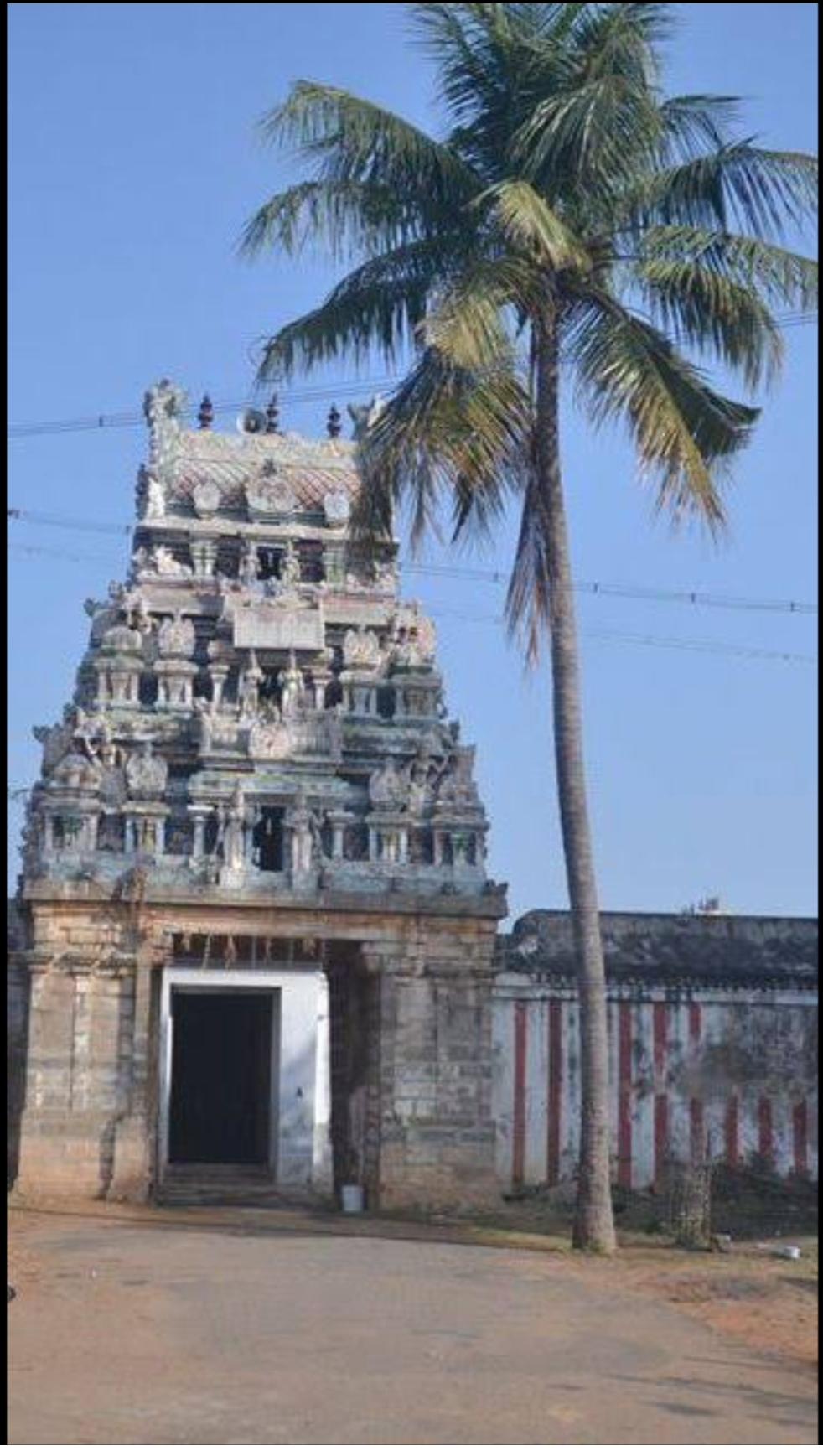
- Interactive map of Thirumanur
- Country: India
- State: Tamil Nadu
- District: Ariyalur

Population (2001)
  - Total: 6,380

Languages
  - Official: Tamil
- Time zone: UTC+5:30 (IST)
- PIN: 621715
- Vehicle registration: TN-61
- Coastline: 0 kilometres (0 mi)
- Nearest city: Thanjavur
- Sex ratio: 1004 ♂/♀
- Literacy: 74.95%
- Avg. summer temperature: 42 °C (108 °F)
- Avg. winter temperature: 32 °C (90 °F)

Thirumanur is a village in the Ariyalur taluk of Ariyalur district, Tamil Nadu, India.

== Demographics ==
As of 2001 census, Thirumanur had a total population of 6389 with 3184 males and 3196 females. Vandarayankattalai is 10 kilometres (6.2 miles) away from Thirumanur.
