= Sannasinallur =

- village
- Nickname: Sannasi
- Country: India
- State: Tamil Nadu
- District: Ariyalur

Government
  - Type: panchayat

Population (2001)
  - Total: 3,554

Languages
  - Official: Tamil
- Time zone: UTC+5:30 (IST)
- PIN: 621730
- Vehicle registration: TN-61
- Coastline: 90 kilometres (56 mi)
- Nearest city: tittagudi@virudachalam
- Sex ratio: 1076 ♂/♀
- Literacy: 54.71%
- Lok Sabha constituency: Kunnam

Sannasinallur is a village in Sendurai Taluk of Ariyalur District, Tamil Nadu, India. Located on the southern bank of the Vellar River bordering Caddalore District. Once part of Trichy District and now in Ariyalur District. People here are highly literate. Many are qualified engineers, doctors, IAS and IPS Officers and many work overseas, mainly in Singapore and Middle east Countries. There is a post office and a high school teaching up to 10th standard. There are quite a few temples and is well known for Pacchai Amman Temple and Semmalaiappar Temple. And just across the river, is the famous Thiruvatta Thurai(also known as Thirunelvoyel Arathurai) Sivan temple. There are two cement factories nearby and is well connected by road and rail with the rest of the state. Trichy international airport is just 70 km away.

== Demographics ==
As per the 2001 census, Sannasinallur had a total population of 3554 with 1712 males and 1842 females.
