= Variyankaval =

Coordinates: 11°14′N 79°18′E

- village
- Interactive map of Variyankaval
- Country: India
- State: Tamil Nadu
- District: Ariyalur

Population (2001)
  - Total: 4,125

Languages
  - Official: Tamil
- Time zone: UTC+5:30 (IST)
- PIN: 621806
- Telephone code: 04331
- Vehicle registration: TN-
- Coastline: 0 kilometres (0 mi)
- Nearest city: Jayankondam
- Sex ratio: 1.000 ♂/♀
- Chidambaram: 71.93%
- Lok Sabha constituency: Chidambaram

Variyankaval is a village in the Andimadam taluk of Ariyalur district, Tamil Nadu, India. It has a government primary school and government higher secondary school. It also has a primary health centre and a bank. Agriculture and weaving are major activities. This village is surrounded by lakes in all directions. There are four old well-planned streets with tiled houses, four newly made streets on the western side and two planned streets on the eastern side of the village. Gangaikonda Cholapuram, a UNESCO heritage site, capital of Chola dynasty, is located 15 km east of this village. It is widely believed that this village belongs to Chola Period and is more than 1000 years old. There are unconfirmed reports that ancient burial urns, called Muthumakkal Thazhi, were unearthed in some fields around this village.

== Demographics ==
As per the 2001 census, Variyankaval had a total population of 4125 with 2063 males and 2062 females.
