= Anikudichan (North) =

Anikudichan poovanipattu
- village
- Location in Tamil Nadu, India Anikudichan (India)
- Coordinates: 11°17′12″N 79°24′19″E
- Country: India
- State: Tamil Nadu
- District: Ariyalur

Population (2001)
  - Total: 1,523

Languages
  - Official: Tamil
- Time zone: UTC+5:30 (IST)
- Vehicle registration: TN-
- Coastline: 0 kilometres (0 mi)
- Sex ratio: 913 ♂/♀
- Literacy: 70.52%

Anikudichan (North) is a village in the Udayarpalayam taluk of Ariyalur district, Tamil Nadu, India.

== Demographics ==
As per the 2001 census, Anikudichan (North) had a total population of 1523 with 796 males and 727 females.
