= Cholamadevi =

- village
- Location in Tamil Nadu, India Cholamadevi (India)
- Coordinates: 11°7′55″N 79°23′59″E
- Country: India
- State: Tamil Nadu
- District: Ariyalur

Population (2001)
  - Total: 3,458

Languages
  - Official: Tamil
- Time zone: UTC+5:30 (IST)
- Vehicle registration: TN-
- Coastline: 0 kilometres (0 mi)
- Sex ratio: 942 ♂/♀
- Literacy: 60.85%

Cholamadevi is a village in the Udayarpalayam Taluk of Ariyalur district, Tamil Nadu, India.

== Demographics ==
As per the 2001 census, Cholamadevi had a total population of 3458 with 1781 males and 1677 females.
