= Udayanatham (East) =

- Country: India
- State: Tamil Nadu
- District: Ariyalur

Government
  - Body: Lok sabha

Population (2001)
  - Total: 1,486

Languages
  - Official: Tamil
- Time zone: UTC+5:30 (IST)
- Postal code: 04331
- Vehicle registration: TN-61
- Coastline: 0 kilometres (0 mi)
- Sex ratio: .997 ♂/♀
- Literacy: 77.30%

Udayanatham (East) is a village in the Udayarpalayam taluk of Ariyalur district in the Indian state of Tamil Nadu.

== Administration ==
The local government consists of the Jayankondam assembly constituency and the Chidambaram (Scheduled Caste) parliamentary assembly.

== Education ==
Government High Sec School is there.

== Healthcare ==
A government hospital is there.

== Economy ==
Government-owned businesses include State Bank Of India, Primary Agriculture Company Bank, Hand Loom Weaver Society, Rani Mahal (Marriage Hall). Other local businesses include grocery stores, tea stalls, a hardware store, mortgage stores, a small mechanic shop, small medical facilities, and a bakery.

== Temples ==
- Vinayakar Temple (Near to lake)
- A/M Kathayi Amman Temple (Location - South Street)
- Samundeeswari Temple (Main Road)
- Ayyanar Temple (North)
- Mariamman Temple (Udayanatham nearby 1 km Dinakudi)
- Kaliamman Temple (Main Road)
- Sri Krishna Temple

Pujas and festivals are held on a regular basis.
