= Kamarasavalli =

- village
- Location in Tamil Nadu, India
- Coordinates: 10.983564°N 79.20211°E
- Country: India
- State: Tamil Nadu
- District: Ariyalur

Population (2001)
  - Total: 3,137

Languages
  - Official: Tamil
- Time zone: UTC+5:30 (IST)
- Vehicle registration: TN-
- Coastline: 0 kilometres (0 mi)
- Sex ratio: 939 ♂/♀
- Literacy: 60.10%

Kamarasavalli is a village in the Ariyalur taluk of Ariyalur district, Tamil Nadu, India.

== Demographics ==
As per the 2001 census, Kamarasavalli had a total population of 3137 with 1618 males and 1519 females.
