= Venmankondan (East) =

- village
- Interactive map of Venmankondan
- Coordinates: 11.1245518°N 79.2420898°E
- Country: India
- State: Tamil Nadu
- District: Ariyalur

Population (2001)
  - Total: 2,932

Languages
  - Official: Tamil
- Time zone: UTC+5:30 (IST)
- Vehicle registration: TN-
- Coastline: 0 kilometres (0 mi)
- Sex ratio: .967 ♂/♀
- Literacy: 58.18%

Venmankondan is a village in the Udayarpalayam taluk of Ariyalur district, Tamil Nadu, India.

== Demographics ==
As per the 2001 census, Venmankondan (East) had a total population of 2932 with 1442 males and 1490 females.
