= Unjini =

Un Jini
- Country: India

Population (2001)
  - Total: 4,637

Languages
  - Official: Tamil
- Time zone: UTC+5:30 (IST)
- Vehicle registration: TN-61
- Coastline: 0 kilometres (0 mi)
- Sex ratio: 1015 ♂/♀
- Literacy: 53.89%

Un Jini is a village in the Sendurai taluk of Ariyalur district, Tamil Nadu, India.

== Demographics ==
As per the 2001 census, Unjini had a total population of 4637 with 2301 males and 2336 females.
