= Sathambadi =

Coordinates: 11°1′26.179″N 79°17′4.933″E

- village
- Interactive map of Sathambadi
- Country: India
- State: Tamil Nadu
- District: Ariyalur

Population (2001)
  - Total: 4,047

Languages
  - Official: Tamil
- Time zone: UTC+5:30 (IST)
- Vehicle registration: TN-
- Coastline: 0 kilometres (0 mi)
- Sex ratio: 0.985 ♂/♀
- Literacy: 52.97%

Sathambadi is a village in the Udayarpalayam Taluk of Ariyalur district, Tamil Nadu, India.

== Demographics ==
According to the 2001 census, Sathambadi had a total population of 4047 with 2008 males and 2039 females.

Sathambadi has one school with up-to 10th standard.
