= Manjamedu =

Coordinates: 12.27186079386693°N 78.30816534343545°E

- village
- Interactive map of Manjamedu
- Country: India
- State: Tamil Nadu
- District: krishnagiri

Population (2001)
  - Total: 2,377

Languages
  - Official: Tamil
- Time zone: UTC+5:30 (IST)
- Vehicle registration: TN-
- Nearest city: Near Inno-geocity, dharmapurai
- Sex ratio: 948 ♂/♀
- Literacy: 71%

Manjamedu is a village in the Pochampalli taluk of krishnagiri district, Tamil Nadu, India. It is situated on the north bank of the Ponnaiyar River.

== Demographics ==
As of 2001 census, Manjamedu had a total population of 2377 with 1220 males and 1157 females.
