= Karaikurichi =

Karaikurichi kaduvettiyar karaikurichi
- village
- Country: India
- State: Tamil Nadu
- District: Ariyalur

Population (2011)
  - Total: 5,950

Languages
  - Official: Tamil
- Time zone: UTC+5:30 (IST)
- PIN: 612904
- Vehicle registration: TN-61
- Coastline: 0 kilometres (0 mi)
- Nearest city: Jayankondam, Kumbakonam
- Sex ratio: 960 ♂/♀
- Literacy: 59.75%
- Lok Sabha constituency: chidambaram

Karaikurichi is a village in the Udayarpalayam Taluk of Ariyalur district, Tamil Nadu, India.

== Demographics ==
As per the 2001 census, Karaikurichi had a total population of 3778 with 1928 males and 1850 females.

Karaikurichi village has the following temples,

1. Lord Shiva 2. Mariyamman
