= Kadambur, Ariyalur =

Village in Ariyalur, Tamil Nadu, India

Kadambur
- Village
- Location in Tamil Nadu, India Kadambur (India)
- Coordinates: 8°59′N 77°52′E
- Country: India
- State: Tamil Nadu
- District: Ariyalur

Population (2001)
  - Total: 4,128

Languages
  - Official: Tamil
- Time zone: UTC+5:30 (IST)
- Vehicle registration: TN-
- Coastline: 0 kilometres (0 mi)
- Sex ratio: 1007 ♂/♀
- Literacy: 58.57%

Kadambur is a village in the udayarpalayam taluk of Ariyalur district, Tamil Nadu, India.

== Demographics ==
According to a 2001 census, Kadambur had a total population of 4,128 with 2,057 males and 2,071 females.
