= Edanganni =

- village
- Country: India
- State: Tamil Nadu
- District: Ariyalur

Population (2001)
  - Total: 2,627

Languages
  - Official: Tamil
- Time zone: UTC+5:30 (IST)
- Vehicle registration: TN-
- Coastline: 0 kilometres (0 mi)
- Sex ratio: 916 ♂/♀
- Literacy: 71.51%

Edanganni is a village in the Udayarpalayam Taluk of Ariyalur district, Tamil Nadu, India.

== Demographics ==
As per the 2001 census, Edanganni had a total population of 2627 with 1371 males and 1256 females.
