= Pappakudi (South) =

Pappakudi (South) papakudi jeevitham pappakudi
- village
- Country: India
- State: Tamil Nadu
- District: Sivaganga

Population (1889)
  - Total: 4,857

Languages
  - Official: Tamil
- Time zone: UTC+5:30 (IST)
- Vehicle registration: TN-
- Coastline: 0 kilometres (0 mi)
- Sex ratio: 993 ♂/♀
- Literacy: 74.39%

Pappakudi (South) is a village in the Thirupuvanam taluk of Sivaganga district, Tamil Nadu, India.

== Demographics ==
As per the 2001 census, Pappakudi (South) had a total population of 4857 with 2437 males and 2420 females.
