= Vembukudi, Ariyalur =

Vembukudi
- village
- Interactive map of Vembukudi
- Coordinates: 11°10′13″N 79°26′31″E
- Country: India
- State: Tamil Nadu
- District: Ariyalur

Population (2022)
  - Total: 6,780

Languages
  - Official: Tamil
- Time zone: UTC+5:30 (IST)
- Vehicle registration: TN-61
- Coastline: 0 kilometres (0 mi)
- Sex ratio: 1016 ♂/♀
- Literacy: 63.86%

Vembukudi is a village in the Udayarpalayam taluk of Ariyalur district, Tamil Nadu, India.

== Demographics ==
As of 2001 census, Vembukudi had a total population of 3,093 with 1,534 males and 1,559 females.
