= Managethi =

Managathi Managethi
- village
- Country: India
- State: Tamil Nadu
- District: Ariyalur

Population (2001)
  - Total: 3,503

Languages
  - Official: Tamil
- Time zone: UTC+5:30 (IST)
- PIN: 621804
- Vehicle registration: TN-
- Coastline: 0 kilometres (0 mi)
- Sex ratio: 996 ♂/♀
- Literacy: 59.78%
- Website: Facebook

Managathi is a village in the Udayarpalayam taluk of Ariyalur district, Tamil Nadu, India.

== Demographics ==
As per the 2001 census, Managethi had a total population of 3503 with 1755 males and 1748 females in this village 80 percentage people's are from konar or yadav community.
