= Sendurai taluk =

Sendurai taluk is a taluk of Ariyalur district of the Indian state of Tamil Nadu. The headquarters of the taluk is the town of Sendurai.

== Demographics ==
According to the 2011 census, the taluk of Sendurai had a population of 111,932 with 55,414 males and 56,518 females. There were 1020 women for every 1000 men. The taluk had a literacy rate of 61.6. Child population in the age group below 6 was 6,350 males and 5,430 females.

== See also ==
- Adhanakurichi
- Anandavadi
