= Ariyalur taluk =

Taluk of Ariyalur district of the Indian state of Tamil Nadu

Coordinates: 11°8′14″N 79°4′40″E

Ariyalur taluk is a taluk of Ariyalur district of the Indian state of Tamil Nadu. The headquarters of the taluk is the town of Ariyalur.

== Demographics ==
According to the 2011 census, the taluk of Ariyalur had a population of 255,749 with 126,931 males and 128,818 females. There were 1,015 women for every 1,000 men. The taluk had a literacy rate of 64.54%. Child population in the age group below 6 was 13,812 Males and 12,795 Females.

== See also ==
- Alanduraiyarkattalai
- Ammbappur
- Andipattakkadu
- Sannavur (North)
