= Ariyalur district =

- District
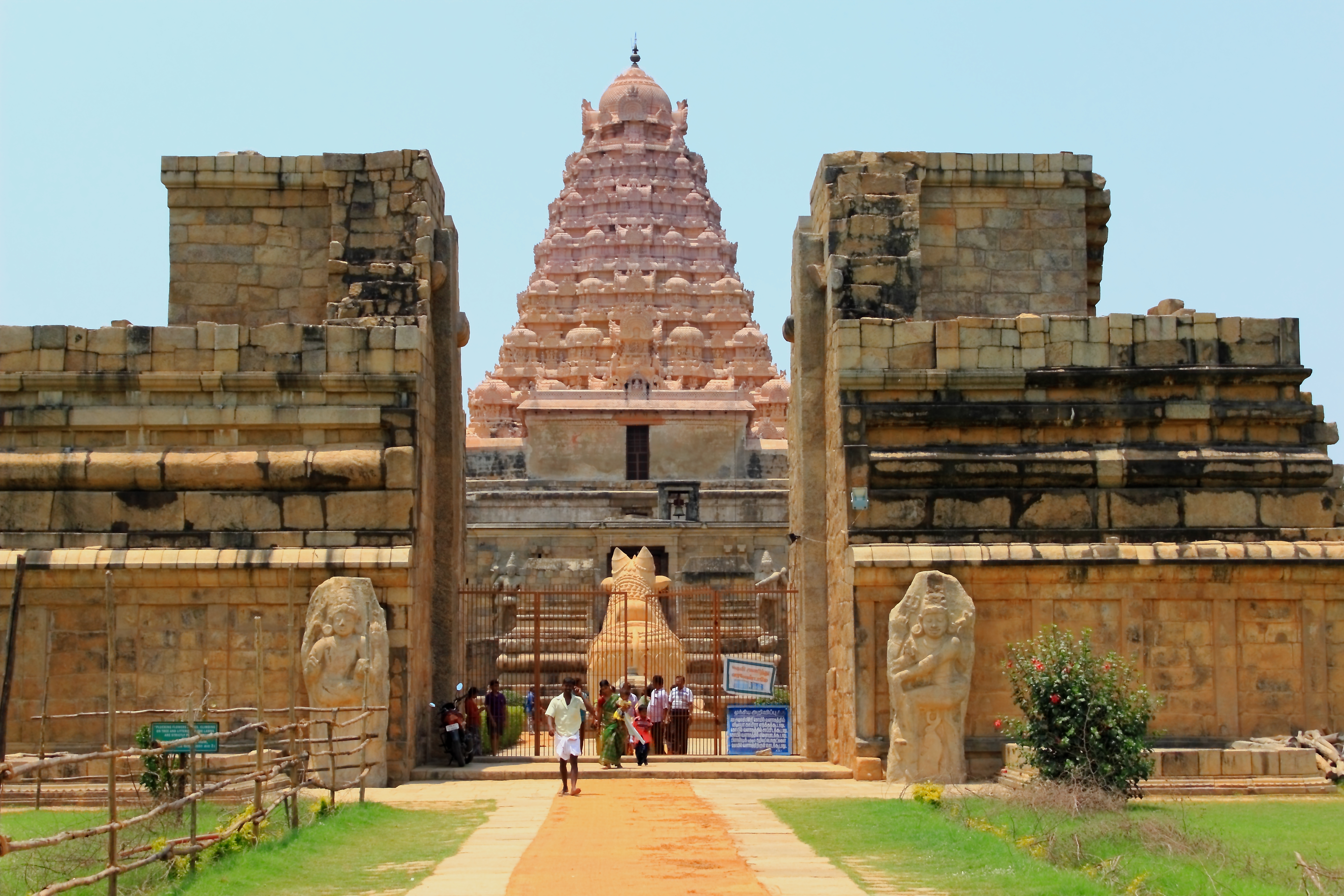
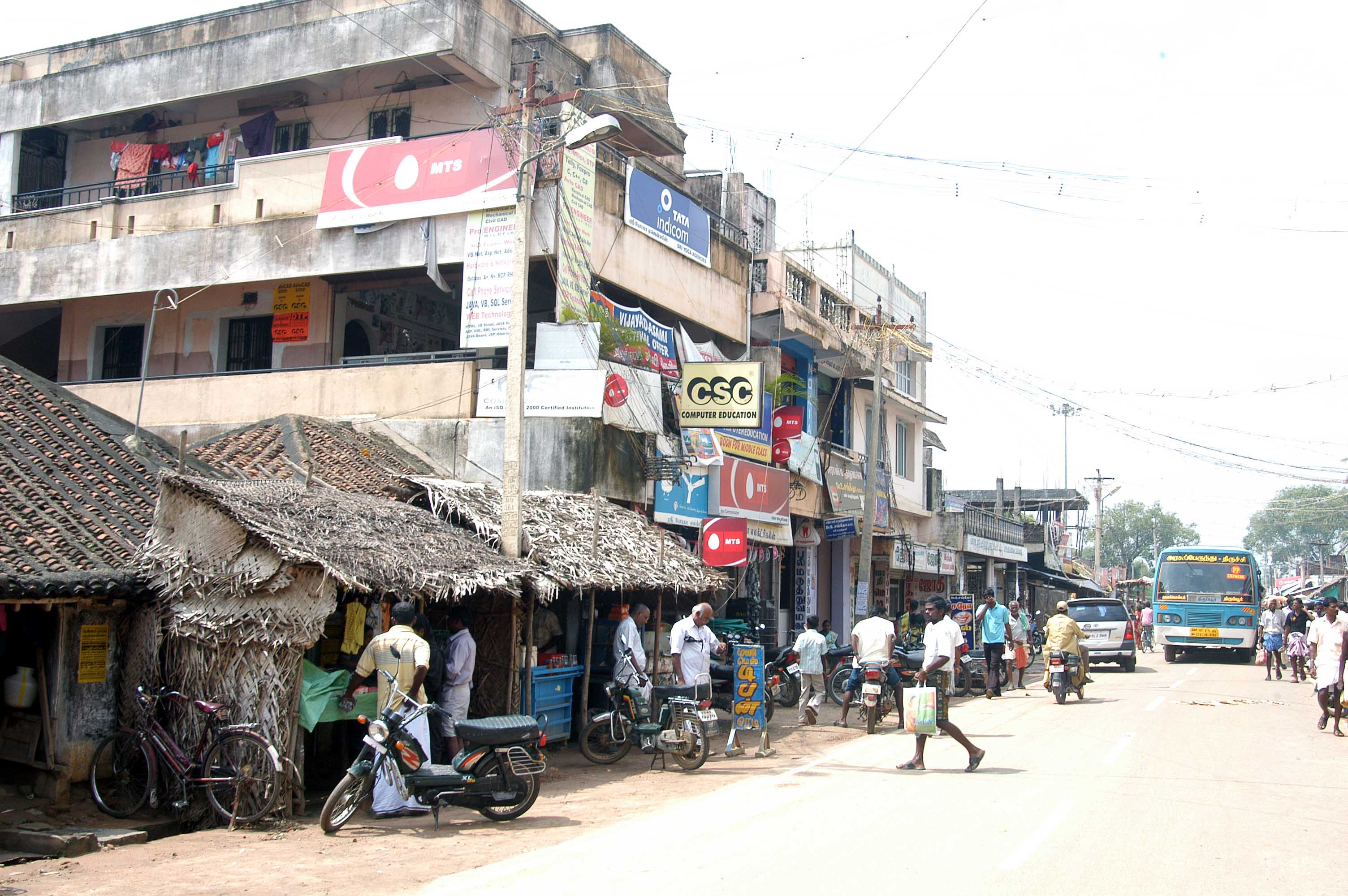
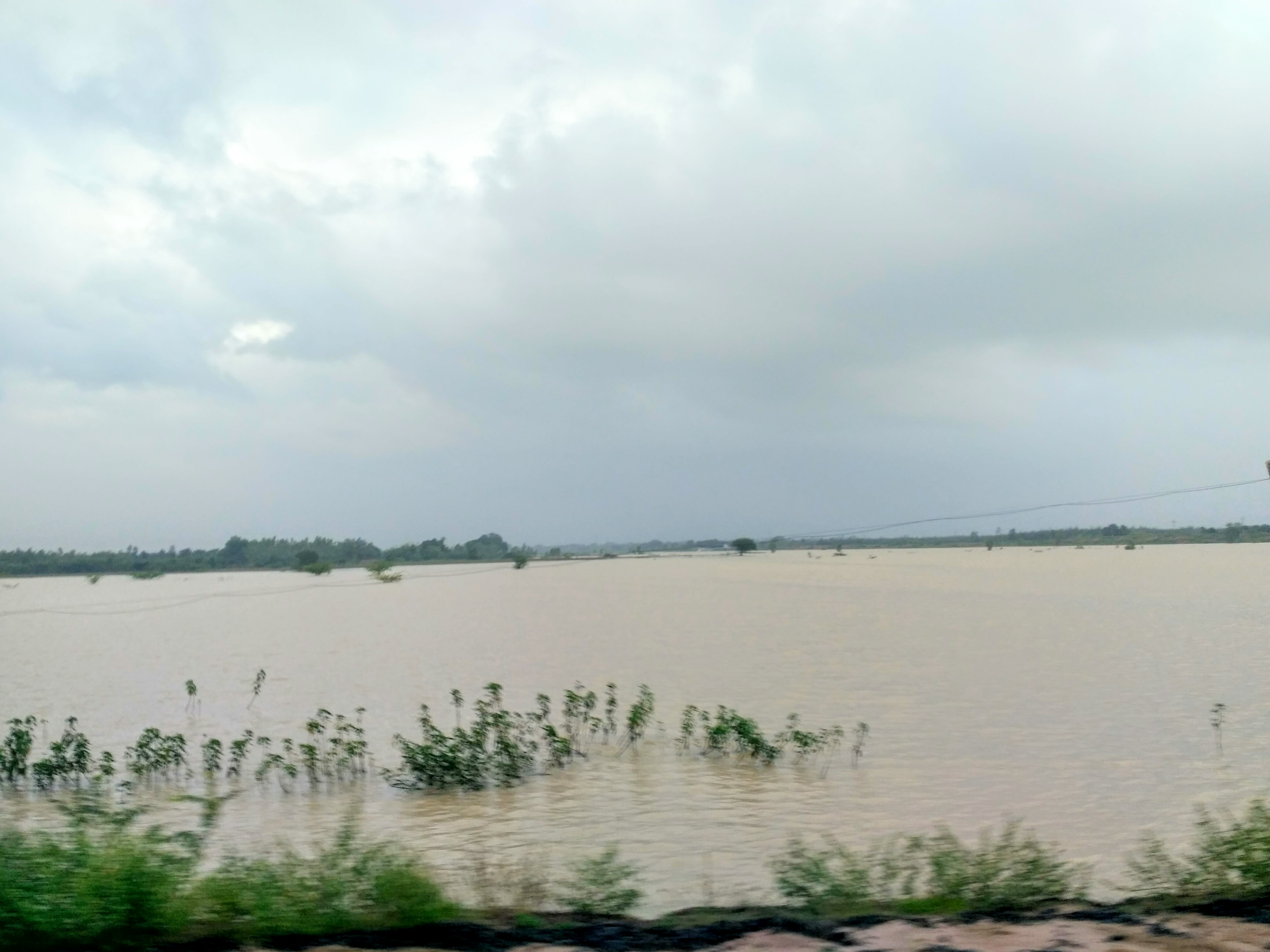
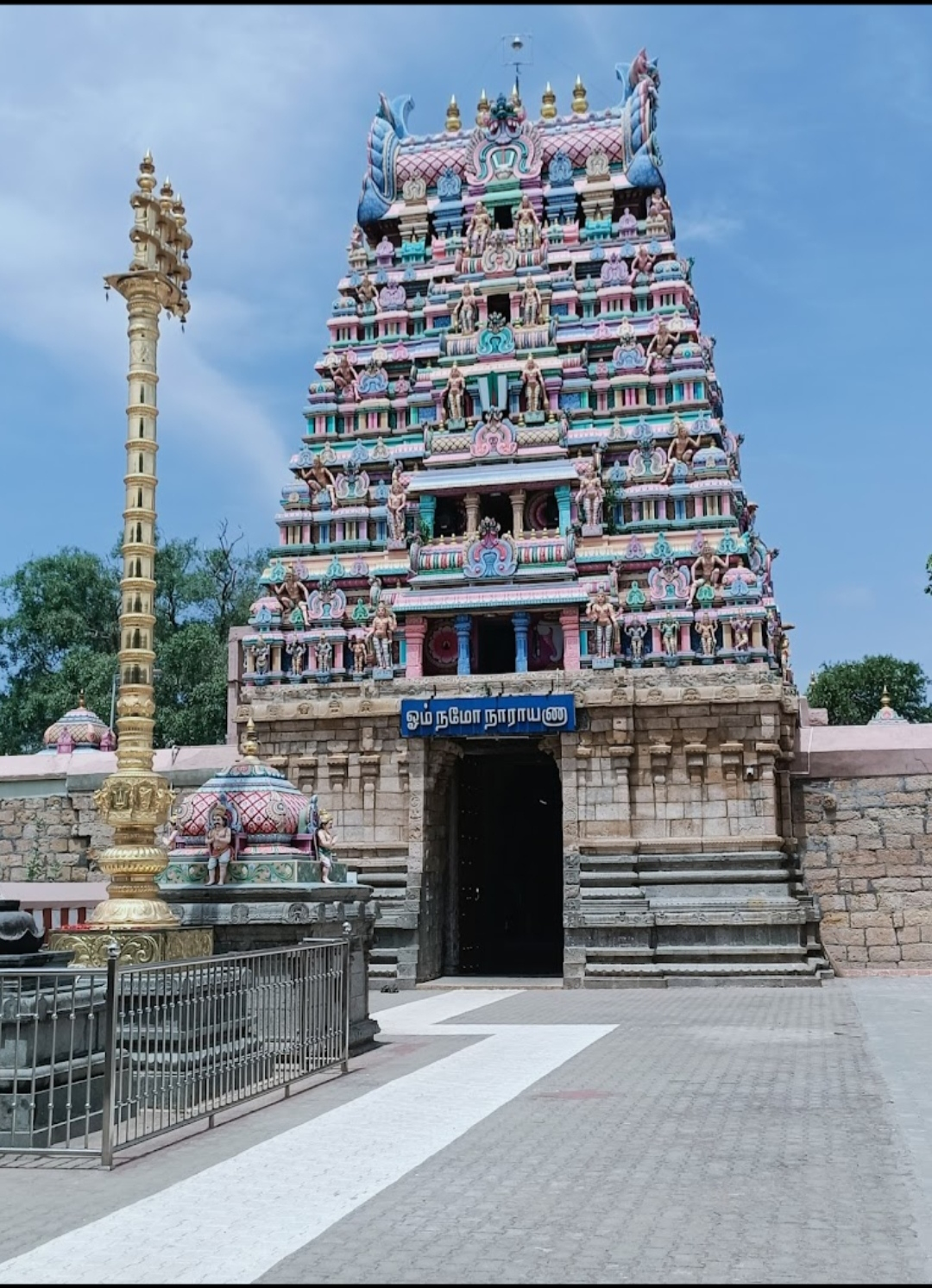
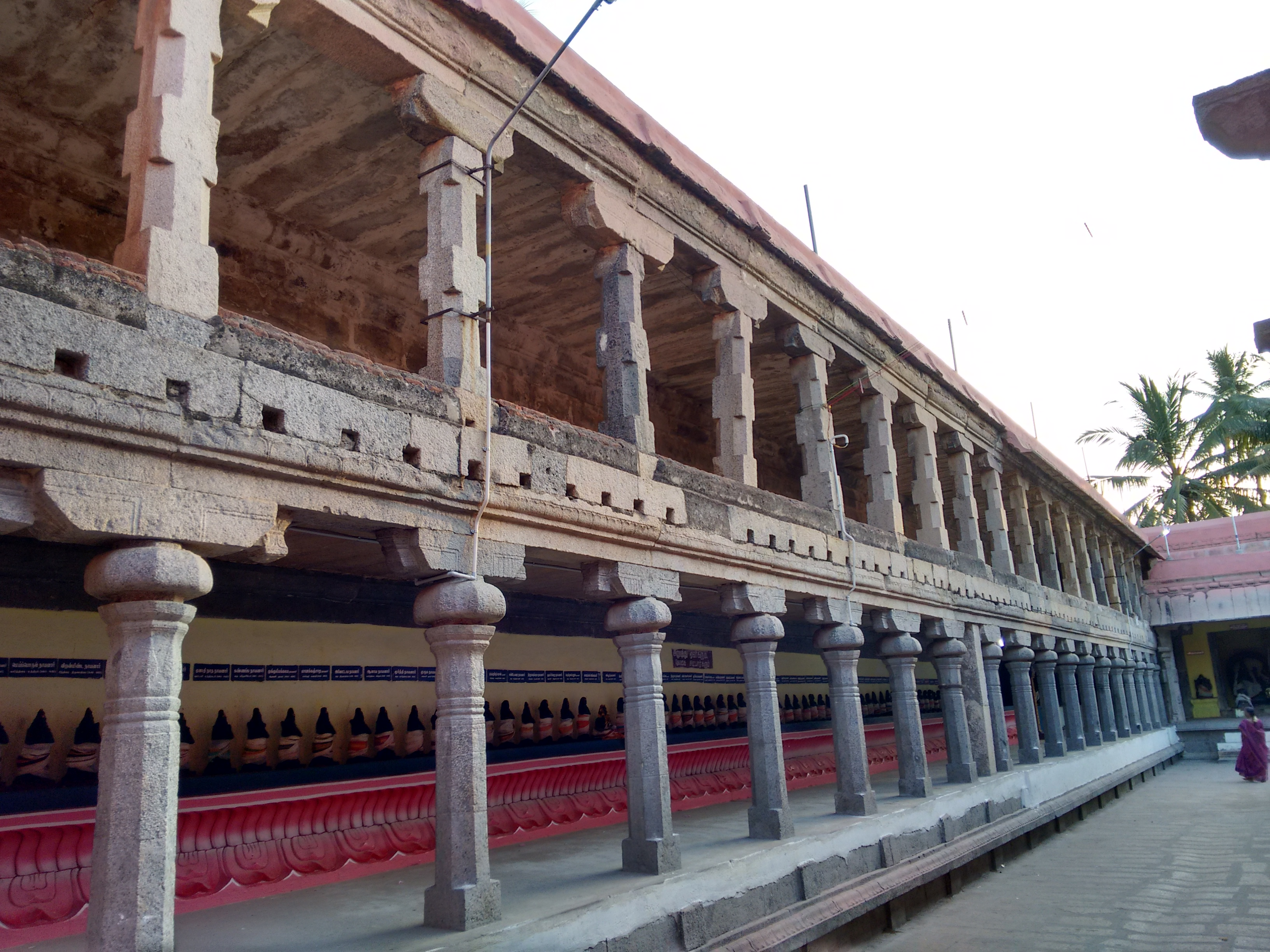
- Brihadiswara Temple at Gangaikonda Cholapuram, bus stand road in Jayankondam, Cholagangam Lake, Kodandaramaswamy Temple, Ariyalur, Thirumazhapadi Siva Temple
- Nickname: Cement city
- Interactive map of Ariyalur district
- Coordinates: 11.13704°N 79.075821°E
- Country: India
- State: Tamil Nadu
- Headquarters: Ariyalur
- Taluks: Ariyalur, Sendurai, Udayarpalayam, Andimadam

Government
  - District Collector: P. Rathinasamy, IAS
  - Superintendent of Police: Vishwesh Balasubramaniam Shastri, IPS.

Area
  - Total: 1,949.31 km^{2} (752.63 sq mi)

Population (2011)
  - Total: 754,894
  - Density: 387.262/km^{2} (1,003.00/sq mi)

Languages
  - Official: Tamil
- Time zone: UTC+5:30 (IST)
- Vehicle registration: TN 61
- Website: ariyalur.nic.in

Ariyalur district is an administrative district, one of the 38 districts in the state of Tamil Nadu in India. The district headquarters is located at Ariyalur. The district encompasses an area of 1,949.31 km^{2}.

Gangaikonda Cholapuram, built by King Rajendra Chola of Chola Empire, is a UNESCO World Heritage Site situated in this district. The district is also known for its rich prehistoric fossils. Many fossils of gigantic molluscs and jawed fishes, at least one fossilized dinosaur egg, and several fragmentary fossils of sauropod and theropod dinosaurs have been discovered here. An on-site museum is being set up at Keelapazhur to preserve and conserve fossils. Ariyalur is noted for its cement industries and Jayankondam has huge reserves of lignite.

== History ==
In 1995, Tiruchirappalli was trifurcated and the Perambalur and Karur districts were formed. Ariyalur district was carved out of Perambalur district on 1 January 2001. But, it was merged with Perambalur district on 31 March 2002. Ariyalur district was re-carved on 23 November 2007. The district is bordered by the districts of Cuddalore to the north and north-east, Mayiladuthurai to the east, Thanjavur to the south and south-east, Tiruchirapalli to the south-west and Perambalur to the west.

=== Brihadeeswarar Temple, Gangaikondacholapuram ===
Brihadisvara Temple at Gangaikonda Cholapuram is a Hindu temple dedicated to Shiva in Gangaikonda Cholapuram, Jayankondam, in the South Indian state of Tamil Nadu. Completed in 1035 CE by Rajendra Chola I as a part of his new capital, this Chola dynasty era temple is similar in design, and has a similar name, as the older 11th century, Brihadeeswarar Temple about 70 km (43 mi) to the southwest in Thanjavur. The Gangaikonda Cholapuram Temple is smaller yet more refined than the Thanjavur Temple. Both are among the largest Shiva temples in South India and examples of Dravidian style temples.

== Demographics ==
Religions in Ariyalur district (2011)
Religion	Percent
Hinduism	93.84%
Christianity	4.95%
Islam	1.05%
Other or not stated	0.16%

According to the 2011 census, Ariyalur district has a population of 754,894, roughly equal to the nation of Guyana or the US state of Alaska. This gives it a ranking of 491 in India (out of a total of 640). The district has a population density of 387 inhabitants per square kilometre (1,000/sq mi) . Its population growth rate over the decade 2001–2011 was 8.19%. Ariyalur has a sex ratio of 1016 females for every 1000 males, and a literacy rate of 71.99%. 11.01% of the population lives in urban areas. Scheduled Castes and Scheduled Tribes make up 23.34% and 1.42% of the population, respectively. As of 2011 it is the third least populous district of Tamil Nadu (out of 32), after Perambalur and Nilgiris. Jayankondam is the most populated town in Ariyalur district. Tamil is the predominant language, spoken by 99.27% of the population.

Historical population
Year	Pop.	±% p.a.
1901	271,501	—
1911	294,621	+0.82%
1921	306,764	+0.40%
1931	308,837	+0.07%
1941	348,381	+1.21%
1951	398,231	+1.35%
1961	437,692	+0.95%
1971	513,704	+1.61%
1981	572,498	+1.09%
1991	636,381	+1.06%
2001	695,524	+0.89%
2011	754,894	+0.82%

== Politics ==
District	No.	Constituency	Name	Party	Alliance	Remarks
Ariyalur	149	Ariyalur	S. Rajendran	AIADMK	AIADMK+	Opposed TVK
Ariyalur	150	Jayankondam	G. Vaithilingam	PMK	AIADMK+	

== Notable locations ==
- Gangaikonda Cholapuram
- Jayankondam
- Karaivetti Bird Sanctuary
- Thirumazhapadi
- Kamarasavalli
- Govindaputtur
- Fossil Museum, Ariyalur
- Ariyalur Perumal Temple
- Udayarpala Palace
- Ariyalur – Kodandarmaswamy Kovil
- Elakurichi Church
- Malaththankulam Madha Church, RR Carrier
- Kallankurichi Kaliya Perumal Kovil

== Transportation ==
Ariyalur is well connected to the neighborhood districts of Thanjavur, Thiruchirappalli, Perambalur and Cuddalore via road. Tamil Nadu State Transport Corporation operates buses regularly to neighborhood cities.

The Ariyalur railway station is one of the prominent station which is located on the Chord Line. Ariyalur is connected to Chennai Egmore railway station.

== See also ==
- List of districts of Tamil Nadu
- List of villages in Ariyalur district
