= Aliabad-e Seh Tolan =

Village in Fars province, Iran

Aliabad-e Seh Tolan Persian: علي اباد سه تلان
- Village
- Location within Iran
- Coordinates: 29°36′03″N 52°49′14″E
- Country: Iran
- Province: Fars
- County: Shiraz
- District: Darian
- Rural District: Darian

Population (2016)
  - Total: 101
- Time zone: UTC+3:30 (IRST)

Aliabad-e Seh Tolan (Persian: علي اباد سه تلان) (Note: Also romanized as 'Alīābād-e Seh Tolān) is a village in Darian Rural District in Darian District of Shiraz County, Fars province, Iran.

== Demographics ==
=== Population ===
At the time of the 2006 National Census, the village's population was 207 in 54 households, when it was in the Central District. The following census in 2011 counted 192 people in 49 households. The 2016 census measured the population of the village as 101 people in 26 households.

In 2024, the rural district was separated from the district in the formation of Darian District.
