= Nilgunak =

Nilgunak نيلگونك
- Village
- Location within Iran
- Coordinates: 29°33′38″N 52°43′55″E
- Country: Iran
- Province: Fars
- County: Shiraz
- Bakhsh: Central
- Rural District: Kaftarak

Population (2006)
  - Total: 535
- Time zone: UTC+3:30 (IRST)
  - Summer (DST): UTC+4:30 (IRDT)

Nilgunak (Persian: نيلگونك, also Romanized as Nīlgūnak and Nilgoonak) is a village in Kaftarak Rural District, in the Central District of Shiraz County, Fars province, Iran. At the 2006 census, its population was 535, in 116 families.
