= Shekaft =

Shekaft شكفت
- Village
- Location within Iran
- Coordinates: 29°17′22″N 52°11′00″E
- Country: Iran
- Province: Fars
- County: Shiraz
- Bakhsh: Arzhan
- Rural District: Kuh Mareh Sorkhi

Population (2006)
  - Total: 613
- Time zone: UTC+3:30 (IRST)
  - Summer (DST): UTC+4:30 (IRDT)

Shekaft (Persian: شكفت; also known as Seguft and Seqaft) is a village in Kuh Mareh Sorkhi Rural District, Arzhan District, Shiraz County, Fars province, Iran. As of the 2006 Iranian national census, its population is 613, with 131 families.
