= Gol Khun =

Gol Khun گلخون
- Village
- Location within Iran
- Coordinates: 29°32′33″N 52°39′30″E
- Country: Iran
- Province: Fars
- County: Shiraz
- Bakhsh: Central
- Rural District: Kaftarak

Population (2006)
  - Total: 739
- Time zone: UTC+3:30 (IRST)
  - Summer (DST): UTC+4:30 (IRDT)

Gol Khun (Persian: گلخون, also Romanized as Gol Khūn and Gel Khūn; also known as Gerkhūn-e Shūbāzār) is a village in Kaftarak Rural District, in the Central District of Shiraz County, Fars province, Iran. At the 2006 census, its population was 739, in 178 families.
