= Dinakan =

Dinakan دينكان
- Township
- Location within Iran
- Coordinates: 29°42′00″N 52°28′25″E
- Country: Iran
- Province: Fars
- County: Shiraz
- Bakhsh: Central
- Rural District: Derak town District

Population (2019)
  - Total: 15,500
- Time zone: UTC+3:30 (IRST)
  - Summer (DST): UTC+4:30 (IRDT)

Dinakan (Persian: دينكان, also Romanized as Dīnakān) is a Township in Derak town District, in the Central District of Shiraz County, Fars province, Iran. At the 2006 census, its population was 2,515, in 682 families.
