= Baghat-e Qaraval =

Baghat-e Qaraval باغات قراول
- Village
- Country: Iran
- Province: Fars
- County: Shiraz
- Bakhsh: Central
- Rural District: Darian

Population (2006)
  - Total: 30
- Time zone: UTC+3:30 (IRST)
  - Summer (DST): UTC+4:30 (IRDT)

Baghat-e Qaraval (Persian: باغات قراول, also Romanized as Bāghāt-e Qarāval) is a village in Darian Rural District, in the Central District of Shiraz County, Fars province, Iran. At the 2006 census, its population was 30, in 12 families.
