= Shahrak-e Seyyed Ala ol Din Hoseyn =

Shahrak-e Seyyed Ala ol Din Hoseyn شهرك سيدعلاالدين حسين
- Village
- Country: Iran
- Province: Fars
- County: Shiraz
- Bakhsh: Central
- Rural District: Qarah Bagh

Population (2006)
  - Total: 707
- Time zone: UTC+3:30 (IRST)
  - Summer (DST): UTC+4:30 (IRDT)

Shahrak-e Seyyed Ala ol Din Hoseyn (Persian: شهرك سيدعلاالدين حسين, also Romanized as Shahrak-e Seyyed 'Alā ol Dīn Ḩoseyn) is a village in Qarah Bagh Rural District, in the Central District of Shiraz County, Fars province, Iran. At the 2006 census, its population was 707, in 184 families.
