= Dowdej, Shiraz =

Village in Fars province, Iran

Dowdej Persian: دودج
- Village
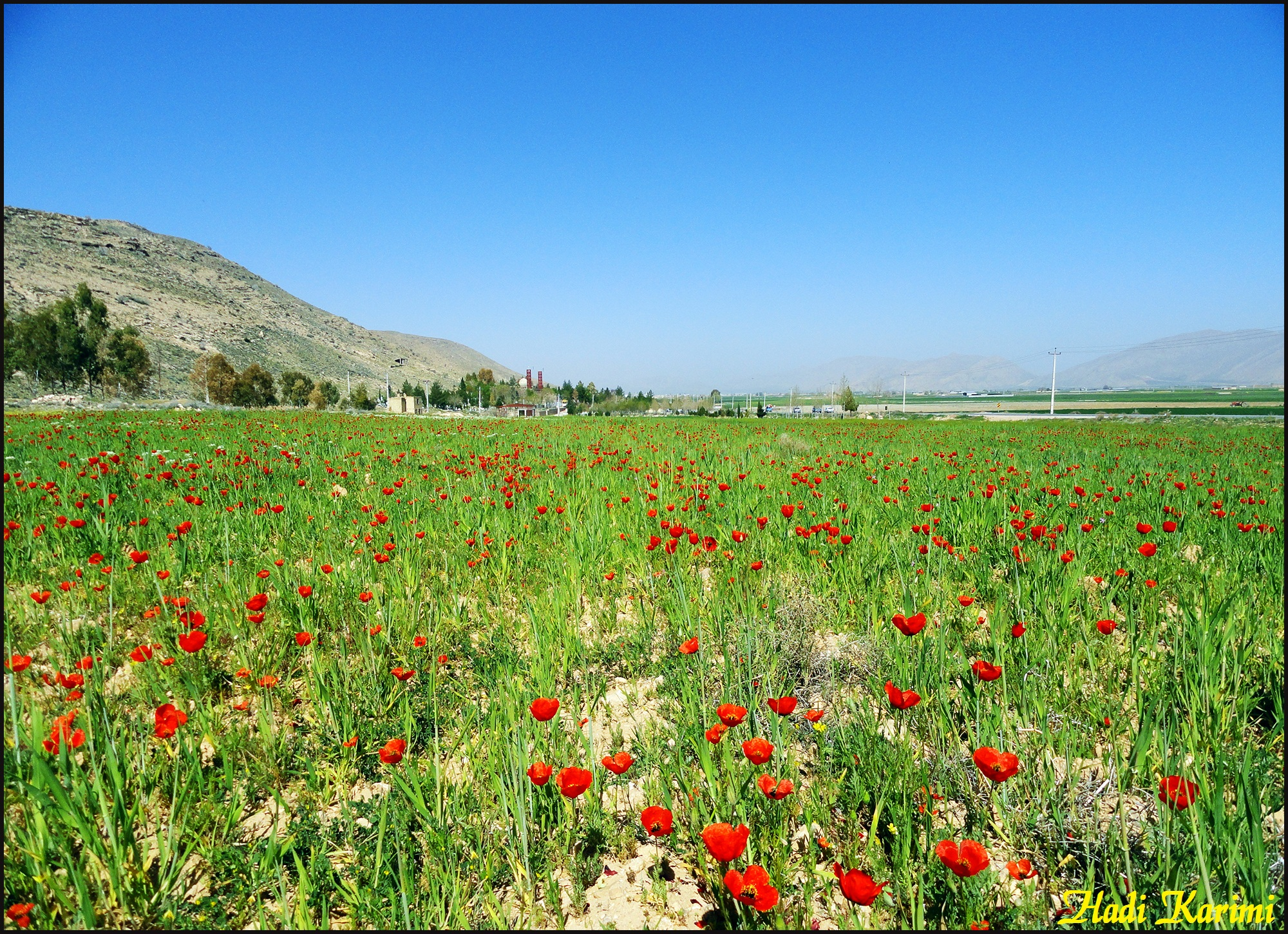

- Location within Iran
- Coordinates: 29°32′26″N 52°58′32″E
- Country: Iran
- Province: Fars
- County: Shiraz
- District: Darian
- Rural District: Darian

Population (2016)
  - Total: 1,143
- Time zone: UTC+3:30 (IRST)

Dowdej (Persian: دودج) (Note: Also romanized as Dūdej; also known as Dodej, Dūdeh, Duder, and Qal‘eh Dūdij) is a village in, and the capital of, Darian Rural District in Darian District of Shiraz County, Fars province, Iran. The rural district was previously administered from the city of Darian.

== Demographics ==
=== Population ===
At the time of the 2006 National Census, the village's population was 1,480 in 355 households, when it was in the Central District. The following census in 2011 counted 1,338 people in 383 households. The 2016 census measured the population of the village as 1,143 people in 374 households.

== History ==
According to Abdolmajid Arfaee, Dūdej is the same as the place called Dutaš mentioned in the Persepolis Administrative Archives of Darius I. It is closely associated in the Persepolis tablets with the place called Uranduš, which Arfaee suggests may have been near present-day Dariyan.

In 2024, the rural district was separated from the Central District in the formation of Darian District.
