= Tall Korehi-ye Bon Rud =

Tall Korehi-ye Bon Rud تل كره اي بنرود
- Village
- Location within Iran
- Coordinates: 29°46′45″N 51°52′21″E
- Country: Iran
- Province: Fars
- County: Shiraz
- Bakhsh: Arzhan
- Rural District: Dasht-e Arzhan

Population (2006)
  - Total: 40
- Time zone: UTC+3:30 (IRST)
  - Summer (DST): UTC+4:30 (IRDT)

Tall Korehi-ye Bon Rud (Persian: تل كره اي بنرود, also Romanized as Tall Korehī-ye Bon Rūd; also known as Tall Koreh) is a village in Dasht-e Arzhan Rural District, Arzhan District, Shiraz County, Fars province, Iran. At the 2006 census, its population was 40, in 9 families.
