= Ab Zangi =

Ab Zangi اب زنگي
- Village
- Location within Iran
- Coordinates: 29°38′45″N 52°34′25″E
- Country: Iran
- Province: Fars
- County: Shiraz
- Bakhsh: Central
- Rural District: Derak

Population (2006)
  - Total: 552
- Time zone: UTC+3:30 (IRST)
  - Summer (DST): UTC+4:30 (IRDT)

Ab Zangi (Persian: اب زنگي, also Romanized as Āb Zangī) is a village in Derak Rural District, in the Central District of Shiraz County, Fars province, Iran. At the 2006 census, its population was 552, in 142 families.
