= Qasr-e Qomsheh =

Qasr-e Qomsheh قصرقمشه
- shahrak
- Location within Iran
- Coordinates: 29°46′32″N 52°26′30″E
- Country: Iran
- Province: Fars
- County: Shiraz
- Bakhsh: Central
- Rural District: Derak

Population (2006)
  - Total: 10,890
- Time zone: UTC+3:30 (IRST)
  - Summer (DST): UTC+4:30 (IRDT)

Qasr-e Qomsheh (Persian: قصرقمشه, also Romanized as Qaşr-e Qomsheh; also known as Kasr-e Gūmīsheh and Qasr-i-Qumisheh) is a town in Derak District, in the Central District of Shiraz County, Fars province, Iran. At the 2006 census, its population was 10,890, in 2,594 families.
