= Shahrak-e Roknabad =

Settlement in Shiraz, Iran

Shahrak-e Roknabad شهرك ركن اباد
- Village
- Interactive map of Shahrak-e Roknabad
- Country: Iran
- Province: Fars
- County: Shiraz
- Bakhsh: Central
- Rural District: Derak

Population (2006)
  - Total: 11,397
- Time zone: UTC+3:30 (IRST)
  - Summer (DST): UTC+4:30 (IRDT)

Shahrak-e Roknabad (Persian: شهرك ركن اباد, also Romanized as Shahrak-e Roknābād) is a village in Derak Rural District, in the Central District of Shiraz County, Fars province, Iran. At the 2006 census, its population was 11,397, in 2,827 families.

== See also ==
- List of cities, towns and villages in Fars province
