= Buanak =

Buanak بوانك
- Village
- Location within Iran
- Coordinates: 29°33′06″N 52°44′57″E
- Country: Iran
- Province: Fars
- County: Shiraz
- Bakhsh: Central
- Rural District: Kaftarak

Population (2006)
  - Total: 674
- Time zone: UTC+3:30 (IRST)
  - Summer (DST): UTC+4:30 (IRDT)

Buanak (Persian: بوانك, also Romanized as Būānak, and also spelled as Bābūnak and Bādūnak) is a village in Kaftarak Rural District, in the Central District of Shiraz County, Fars province, Iran. At the 2006 census, its population was 674, in 151 families.
