= Bardej =

Bardej بردج
- Village
- Location within Iran
- Coordinates: 29°38′21″N 52°45′11″E
- Country: Iran
- Province: Fars
- County: Shiraz
- Bakhsh: Central
- Rural District: Darian

Population (2006)
  - Total: 446
- Time zone: UTC+3:30 (IRST)
  - Summer (DST): UTC+4:30 (IRDT)

Bardej (Persian: بردج, also Romanized as Bardaj; also known as Bardej-e Ḩowmeh and Bardij) is a village in Darian Rural District, in the Central District of Shiraz County, Fars province, Iran. At the 2006 census, its population was 446, in 116 families.
