= Bagdaneh =

Bagdaneh بگدانه
- Village
- Location within Iran
- Coordinates: 29°17′16″N 52°08′18″E
- Country: Iran
- Province: Fars
- County: Shiraz
- Bakhsh: Arzhan
- Rural District: Kuh Mareh Sorkhi

Population (2006)
  - Total: 884
- Time zone: UTC+3:30 (IRST)
  - Summer (DST): UTC+4:30 (IRDT)

Bagdaneh (Persian: بگدانه, also Romanized as Bagdāneh; also known as Bīgdāneh and Yekdāneh) is a village in Kuh Mareh Sorkhi Rural District, Arzhan District, Shiraz County, Fars province, Iran. At the 2006 census, its population was 884, in 188 families. It is located in a valley in a mountainous part of the country in the south.
