= Qandilak =

Qandilak قنديلك
- Village
- Location within Iran
- Coordinates: 29°27′14″N 52°53′16″E
- Country: Iran
- Province: Fars
- County: Shiraz
- Bakhsh: Central
- Rural District: Kaftarak

Population (2006)
  - Total: 122
- Time zone: UTC+3:30 (IRST)
  - Summer (DST): UTC+4:30 (IRDT)

Qandilak (Persian: قنديلك, also Romanized as Qandīlak, Gandīlak and Qandīnak) is a village of Kaftarak Rural District in the Central District of Shiraz County, Fars province, Iran. At the 2006 census, its population was 122, in 29 families.
