= Cheshmeh Bardi =

Cheshmeh Bardi چشمه بردي
- Village
- Location within Iran
- Coordinates: 29°30′58″N 52°14′23″E
- Country: Iran
- Province: Fars
- County: Shiraz
- Bakhsh: Arzhan
- Rural District: Kuh Mareh Sorkhi

Population (2006)
  - Total: 287
- Time zone: UTC+3:30 (IRST)
  - Summer (DST): UTC+4:30 (IRDT)

Cheshmeh Bardi (Persian: چشمه بردي, also Romanized as Cheshmeh Bardī) is a village in Kuh Mareh Sorkhi Rural District, Arzhan District, Shiraz County, Fars province, Iran. At the 2006 census, its population was 287, in 58 families.
