= Tarbor Rural District =

Rural district in Fars province, Iran

Tarbor Rural District Persian: دهستان تربر
- Rural District
- Location within Iran
- Coordinates: 29°37′02″N 52°51′27″E
- Country: Iran
- Province: Fars
- County: Shiraz
- District: Darian
- Capital: Tarbor-e Jafari
- Time zone: UTC+3:30 (IRST)

Tarbor Rural District (Persian: دهستان تربر) is in Darian District of Shiraz County, Fars province, Iran. Its capital is the village of Tarbor-e Jafari, whose population at the time of the 2016 National Census was 1,795 people in 559 households.

== History ==
In 2024, Darian Rural District and the city of Darian were separated from the Central District in the formation of Darian District, and Tarbor Rural District was created in the new district.
