= Kianabad =

Kian Abad كيان آباد
- Village
- Location within Iran
- Coordinates: 29°32′45″N 52°27′54″E
- Country: Iran
- Province: Fars
- County: Shiraz
- Bakhsh: Central
- Rural District: Qarah Bagh

Population (2017)
  - Total: 5,039
- Time zone: UTC+3:30 (IRST)
  - Summer (DST): UTC+4:30 (IRDT)
- Area code: 3772

Kian Abad (Persian: كيان آباد, also Romanized as Kīānābād and Kīyân-âbâd; also known as Kainābād and Kīnābād) is a village in Qarah Bagh Rural District, in the Central District of Shiraz County, Fars province, Iran. At the 2017 census, its population was 5,039, in 1,389 families.
