= Bagh-e Khoshrow =

Bagh-e Khoshrow باغ خشرو
- Village
- Country: Iran
- Province: Fars
- County: Shiraz
- Bakhsh: Central
- Rural District: Qarah Bagh

Population (2006)
  - Total: 95
- Time zone: UTC+3:30 (IRST)
  - Summer (DST): UTC+4:30 (IRDT)

Bagh-e Khoshrow (Persian: باغ خشرو, also Romanized as Bāgh-e Khoshrow) is a village in Qarah Bagh Rural District, in the Central District of Shiraz County, Fars province, Iran. At the 2006 census, its population was 95, in 23 families.
