= Pol-e Fasa =

Pol-e Fasa پل فسا
- Village
- Location within Iran
- Coordinates: 29°29′01″N 52°38′26″E
- Country: Iran
- Province: Fars
- County: Shiraz
- Bakhsh: Central
- Rural District: Qarah Bagh

Population (2006)
  - Total: 61
- Time zone: UTC+3:30 (IRST)
  - Summer (DST): UTC+4:30 (IRDT)

Pol-e Fasa (Persian: پل فسا, also Romanized as Pol-e Fasā) is a village in Qarah Bagh Rural District, in the Central District of Shiraz County, Fars province, Iran. At the 2006 census, its population was 61, in 17 families.
