= Cheramakan =

Cheramakan چرامكان
- Village
- Location within Iran
- Coordinates: 29°42′21″N 52°10′14″E
- Country: Iran
- Province: Fars
- County: Shiraz
- Bakhsh: Arzhan
- Rural District: Qarah Chaman

Population (2006)
  - Total: 169
- Time zone: UTC+3:30 (IRST)
  - Summer (DST): UTC+4:30 (IRDT)

Cheramakan (Persian: چرامكان, also Romanized as Cherāmakān and Charā Makān; also known as Charmakān and Chārmeh Kan) is a village in Qarah Chaman Rural District, Arzhan District, Shiraz County, Fars province, Iran. At the 2006 census, its population was 169, in 36 families.
