= Khaljuy =

Khaljuy خلجوي
- Village
- Location within Iran
- Coordinates: 29°33′35″N 52°41′21″E
- Country: Iran
- Province: Fars
- County: Shiraz
- Bakhsh: Central
- Rural District: Kaftarak

Population (2006)
  - Total: 610
- Time zone: UTC+3:30 (IRST)
  - Summer (DST): UTC+4:30 (IRDT)

Khaljuy (Persian: خلجوي, also Romanized as Khaljūy) is a village in Kaftarak Rural District, in the Central District of Shiraz County, Fars province, Iran. At the 2006 census, its population was 610, in 134 families.
