= Kamarabad-e Arnadi =

Kamarabad-e Arnadi كمرابادارندي
- Village
- Location within Iran
- Coordinates: 29°36′06″N 52°08′57″E
- Country: Iran
- Province: Fars
- County: Shiraz
- Bakhsh: Arzhan
- Rural District: Kuh Mareh Sorkhi

Population (2006)
  - Total: 285
- Time zone: UTC+3:30 (IRST)
  - Summer (DST): UTC+4:30 (IRDT)

Kamarabad-e Arnadi (Persian: كمرابادارندي, also Romanized as Kamarābād-e Ārnadī; also known as Kamarābād-e Ārmandī) is a village in Kuh Mareh Sorkhi Rural District, Arzhan District, Shiraz County, Fars province, Iran. At the 2006 census, its population was 285, in 47 families.
