= Shahrak-e Hafez =

Shahrak-e Hafez شهرك حافظ
- Village
- Country: Iran
- Province: Fars
- County: Shiraz
- Bakhsh: Central
- Rural District: Derak

Population (2006)
  - Total: 3,285
- Time zone: UTC+3:30 (IRST)
  - Summer (DST): UTC+4:30 (IRDT)

Shahrak-e Hafez (Persian: شهرك حافظ, also Romanized as Shahrak-e Ḩāfez̧) is a village in Derak Rural District, in the Central District of Shiraz County, Fars province, Iran. At the 2006 census, its population was 3,285, in 836 families.
