= Masarm-e Sofla =

Masarm-e Sofla ماصرم سفلي
- Village
- Location within Iran
- Coordinates: 29°32′21″N 52°11′09″E
- Country: Iran
- Province: Fars
- County: Shiraz
- Bakhsh: Arzhan
- Rural District: Kuh Mareh Sorkhi

Population (2006)
  - Total: 251
- Time zone: UTC+3:30 (IRST)
  - Summer (DST): UTC+4:30 (IRDT)

Masarm-e Sofla (Persian: ماصرم سفلي, also Romanized as Māşarm-e Soflá, Māsaram-e Soflá, and Māsarm-e Soflá; also known as Māsaram, Māsaram-e Pā’īn, and Māsarm-e Pā’īn) is a village in Kuh Mareh Sorkhi Rural District, Arzhan District, Shiraz County, Fars province, Iran. At the 2006 census, its population was 251, in 61 families.
