= Deh Kadeh Salami =

Deh Kadeh Salami دهكده سلامي
- Village
- Country: Iran
- Province: Fars
- County: Shiraz
- Bakhsh: Central
- Rural District: Qarah Bagh

Population (2006)
  - Total: 43
- Time zone: UTC+3:30 (IRST)
  - Summer (DST): UTC+4:30 (IRDT)

Deh Kadeh Salami (Persian: دهكده سلامي, also Romanized as Deh Kadeh Salāmī) is a village in Qarah Bagh Rural District, in the Central District (Shiraz County), Fars province, Iran. At the 2006 census, its population was 43, in 8 families.
