= Jaresqan =

Jaresqan جرسقان
- Village
- Location within Iran
- Coordinates: 29°30′39″N 52°32′43″E
- Country: Iran
- Province: Fars
- County: Shiraz
- Bakhsh: Central
- Rural District: Qarah Bagh

Population (2006)
  - Total: 1,539
- Time zone: UTC+3:30 (IRST)
  - Summer (DST): UTC+4:30 (IRDT)

Jaresqan (Persian: جرسقان, also Romanized as Jaresqān; also known as Jers̄oqān) is a village in Qarah Bagh Rural District, in the Central District of Shiraz County, Fars province, Iran. At the 2006 census, its population was 1,539, in 364 families.
