= Musqan =

Musqan موسقان
- Village
- Location within Iran
- Coordinates: 29°15′17″N 52°09′18″E
- Country: Iran
- Province: Fars
- County: Shiraz
- Bakhsh: Arzhan
- Rural District: Kuh Mareh Sorkhi

Population (2006)
  - Total: 897
- Time zone: UTC+3:30 (IRST)
  - Summer (DST): UTC+4:30 (IRDT)

Musqan (Persian: موسقان, also Romanized as Mūsqān and Mowseqān; also known as Mosqān and Musghān) is a village in Kuh Mareh Sorkhi Rural District, Arzhan District, Shiraz County, Fars province, Iran. At the 2006 census, its population was 897, in 186 families.
