= Khatiri =

Khatiri خطيري
- Village
- Location within Iran
- Coordinates: 29°40′14″N 52°08′33″E
- Country: Iran
- Province: Fars
- County: Shiraz
- Bakhsh: Arzhan
- Rural District: Qarah Chaman

Population (2006)
  - Total: 1,038
- Time zone: UTC+3:30 (IRST)
  - Summer (DST): UTC+4:30 (IRDT)

Khatiri (Persian: خطيري, also Romanized as Khaţīrī) is a village in Qarah Chaman Rural District, Arzhan District, Shiraz County, Fars province, Iran. At the 2006 census, its population was 1,038, in 213 families.
