= Beneger =

Beneger بنگر
- Village
- Location within Iran
- Coordinates: 29°26′41″N 52°10′03″E
- Country: Iran
- Province: Fars
- County: Shiraz
- Bakhsh: Arzhan
- Rural District: Kuh Mareh Sorkhi

Population (2006)
  - Total: 398
- Time zone: UTC+3:30 (IRST)
  - Summer (DST): UTC+4:30 (IRDT)

Beneger (Persian: بنگر) is a village in Kuh Mareh Sorkhi Rural District, Arzhan District, Shiraz County, Fars province, Iran.

== Demographics ==
At the 2006 census, its population was 398, in 78 families.
