= Deh Sarv =

Deh Sarv ده سرو
- Village
- Location within Iran
- Coordinates: 29°32′25″N 52°09′50″E
- Country: Iran
- Province: Fars
- County: Shiraz
- Bakhsh: Arzhan
- Rural District: Kuh Mareh Sorkhi

Population (2006)
  - Total: 95
- Time zone: UTC+3:30 (IRST)
  - Summer (DST): UTC+4:30 (IRDT)

Deh Sarv (Persian: ده سرو; also known as Deh Salab and Deh Sarm) is a village in Kuh Mareh Sorkhi Rural District, Arzhan District, Shiraz County, Fars province, Iran. At the 2006 census, its population was 95, in 19 families.
