= Par Eshkaft =

Par Eshkaft پراشكفت
- Village
- Location within Iran
- Coordinates: 29°37′53″N 52°04′31″E
- Country: Iran
- Province: Fars
- County: Shiraz
- Bakhsh: Arzhan
- Rural District: Qarah Chaman

Population (2006)
  - Total: 77
- Time zone: UTC+3:30 (IRST)
  - Summer (DST): UTC+4:30 (IRDT)

Par Eshkaft (Persian: پراشكفت, also Romanized as Perāshkaft and Per Eshkaft; also known as Per Eshkafī) is a village in Qarah Chaman Rural District, Arzhan District, Shiraz County, Fars province, Iran. At the 2006 census, its population was 77, in 22 families.
