= Masarm-e Olya =

Masarm-e Olya ماصرم عليا
- Village
- Location within Iran
- Coordinates: 29°33′06″N 52°10′52″E
- Country: Iran
- Province: Fars
- County: Shiraz
- Bakhsh: Arzhan
- Rural District: Kuh Mareh Sorkhi

Population (2006)
  - Total: 184
- Time zone: UTC+3:30 (IRST)
  - Summer (DST): UTC+4:30 (IRDT)

Masarm-e Olya (Persian: ماصرم عليا, also Romanized as Māşarm-e 'Olyā; also known as Māsaram and Māsarm-e Bāla) is a village in Kuh Mareh Sorkhi Rural District, Arzhan District, Shiraz County, Fars province, Iran. At the 2006 census, its population was 184, in 43 families.
