= Baharan, Shiraz =

Baharan بهاران
- Village
- Location within Iran
- Country: Iran
- Province: Fars
- County: Shiraz
- Bakhsh: Central
- Rural District: Kaftarak

Population (2016)
  - Total: 2,178
- Time zone: UTC+3:30 (IRST)
  - Summer (DST): UTC+4:30 (IRDT)

Baharan (Persian: بهاران, previously known as Goshnekan) is a village in Kaftarak Rural District, in the Central District of Shiraz County, Fars province, Iran. At the 2016 census, its population was 2,178 in 644 families.
