= Qaleh-ye Karbalai Mohammad Ali =

Qaleh-ye Karbalai Mohammad Ali قلعه كربلايي محمدعلي
- Village
- Location within Iran
- Coordinates: 29°48′35″N 51°52′51″E
- Country: Iran
- Province: Fars
- County: Shiraz
- Bakhsh: Arzhan
- Rural District: Dasht-e Arzhan

Population (2006)
  - Total: 32
- Time zone: UTC+3:30 (IRST)
  - Summer (DST): UTC+4:30 (IRDT)

Qaleh-ye Karbalai Mohammad Ali (Persian: قلعه كربلايي محمدعلي, also Romanized as Qal‘eh-ye Karbalā’ī Moḩammad 'Alī) is a village in Dasht-e Arzhan Rural District, Arzhan District, Shiraz County, Fars province, Iran. At the 2006 census, its population was 32, in 10 families.
