= Tarbor =

Tarbor (Persian: تربر) may refer to:

- Tarbor-e Jafari
- Tarbor-e Lay Bisheh
- Tarbor-e Sadat
