= Badam Zar =

Badam Zar or Badamzar (Persian: بادام زار) may refer to:

- Badam Zar, Bushehr
- Badamzar, Izeh, Khuzestan Province
- Badam Zar, Dehdez, Khuzestan Province
