= Cheshmeh Qoroq-e Chin =

Cheshmeh Qoroq-e Chin چشمه قرق چين
- Village
- Location within Iran
- Coordinates: 29°41′10″N 52°10′37″E
- Country: Iran
- Province: Fars
- County: Shiraz
- Bakhsh: Arzhan
- Rural District: Qarah Chaman

Population (2006)
  - Total: 69
- Time zone: UTC+3:30 (IRST)
  - Summer (DST): UTC+4:30 (IRDT)

Cheshmeh Qoroq-e Chin (Persian: چشمه قرق چين, also Romanized as Cheshmeh Qoroq-e Chīn; also known as Cheshmeh Qoroq-e Ḩoseyn) is a village in Qarah Chaman Rural District, Arzhan District, Shiraz County, Fars province, Iran. At the 2006 census, its population was 69, in 16 families.
