= Tang-e Kabutari =

Tang-e Kabutari تنگ كبوتري
- Village
- Location within Iran
- Coordinates: 29°52′11″N 52°07′31″E
- Country: Iran
- Province: Fars
- County: Shiraz
- Bakhsh: Central
- Rural District: Derak

Population (2006)
  - Total: 42
- Time zone: UTC+3:30 (IRST)
  - Summer (DST): UTC+4:30 (IRDT)

Tang-e Kabutari (Persian: تنگ كبوتري, also Romanized as Tang-e Kabūtarī) is a village in Derak Rural District, in the Central District of Shiraz County, Fars province, Iran. At the 2006 census, its population was 42, in 9 families.
