= Ab Pardeh =

Ab Pardeh اب پرده
- Village
- Location within Iran
- Coordinates: 29°53′01″N 52°09′37″E
- Country: Iran
- Province: Fars
- County: Shiraz
- Bakhsh: Central
- Rural District: Derak

Population (2006)
  - Total: 434
- Time zone: UTC+3:30 (IRST)
  - Summer (DST): UTC+4:30 (IRDT)

Ab Pardeh (Persian: اب پرده, also romanized as Āb Pardeh) is a village in Derak Rural District, in the Central District of Shiraz County, Fars province, Iran. At the 2006 census, its population was 434, in 110 families.
