= Chenar Faryab =

Chenar Faryab چنارفارياب
- Village
- Location within Iran
- Coordinates: 29°31′03″N 52°11′10″E
- Country: Iran
- Province: Fars
- County: Shiraz
- Bakhsh: Arzhan
- Rural District: Kuh Mareh Sorkhi

Population (2006)
  - Total: 332
- Time zone: UTC+3:30 (IRST)
  - Summer (DST): UTC+4:30 (IRDT)

Chenar Faryab (Persian: چنارفارياب, also Romanized as Chenār Fāryāb, Chenār-e Fāryāb, and Chenār Fārīāb; also known as Chenār Pāryāb) is a village in Kuh Mareh Sorkhi Rural District, Arzhan District, Shiraz County, Fars province, Iran. At the 2006 census, its population was 332, in 74 families.
