= Darreh Marun =

Darreh Marun دره مارون
- Village
- Location within Iran
- Coordinates: 29°45′05″N 52°16′04″E
- Country: Iran
- Province: Fars
- County: Shiraz
- Bakhsh: Arzhan
- Rural District: Qarah Chaman

Population (2006)
  - Total: 171
- Time zone: UTC+3:30 (IRST)
  - Summer (DST): UTC+4:30 (IRDT)

Darreh Marun (Persian: دره مارون, also Romanized as Darreh Mārūn) is a village in Qarah Chaman Rural District, Arzhan District, Shiraz County, Fars province, Iran. At the 2006 census, its population was 171, in 40 families.
