= Chur Ab Qalandari =

Village in Fars province, Iran

Chur Ab Qalandari (also Romanized as Chūr Āb Qalandarī; also known as Cherr Āb Qalandarī-ye 'Olyā) is a village in Qarah Chaman Rural District, Arzhan District, Shiraz County, Fars province, Iran. At the 2006 census, its population was 241, in 50 families.
