= Dasht-e Arzhan =

Village in Fars province, Iran

Dasht-e Arzhan Persian: دشت ارژن
- Village
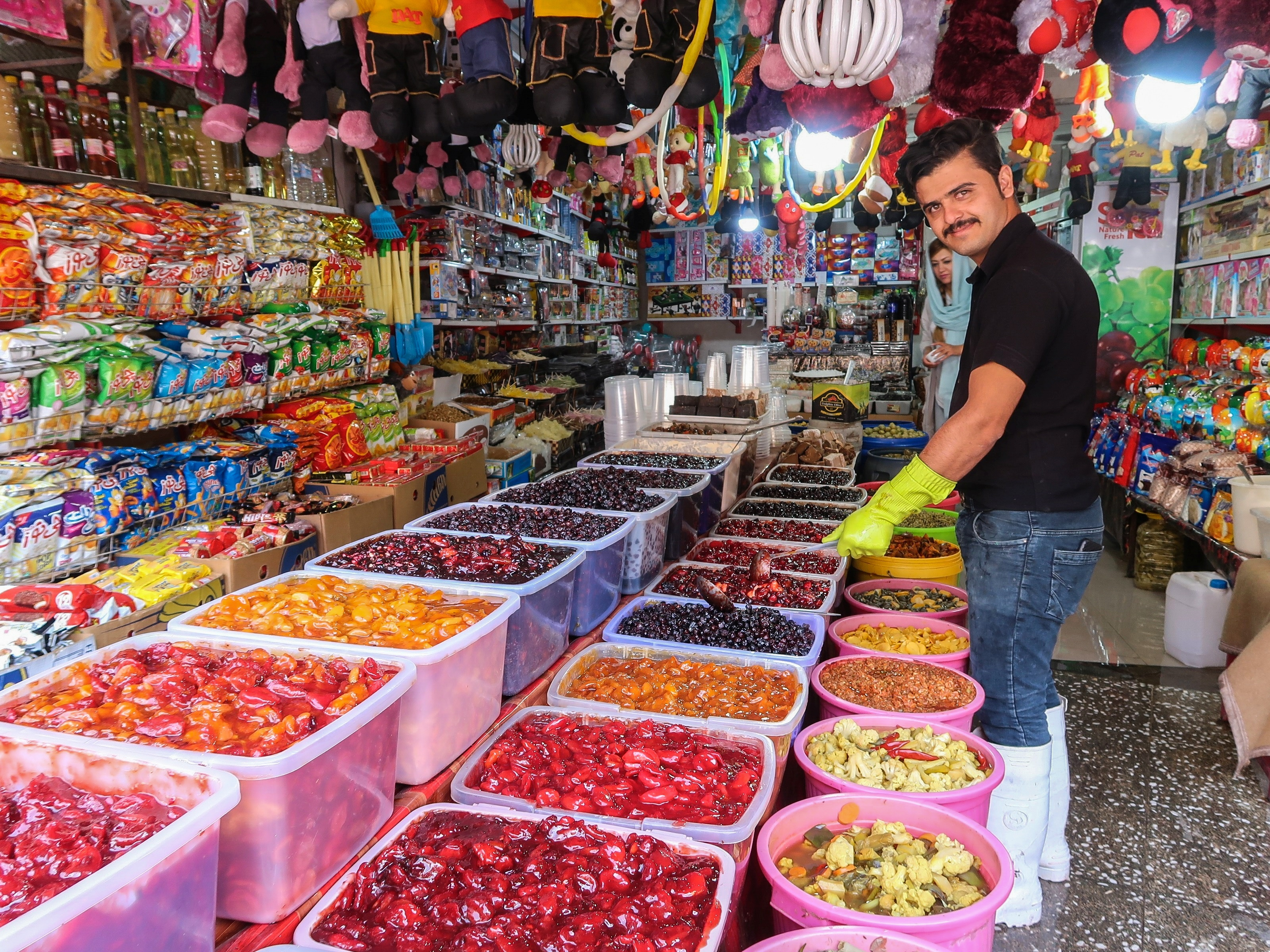
- Shop in Dasht-e Arzhan

- Location within Iran
- Coordinates: 29°39′37″N 51°59′07″E
- Country: Iran
- Province: Fars
- County: Shiraz
- District: Arzhan
- Rural District: Dasht-e Arzhan

Population (2016)
  - Total: 2,340
- Time zone: UTC+3:30 (IRST)

Dasht-e Arzhan (Persian: دشت ارژن) (Note: Also known as Dachte-Arjan, Dasht-e Arjan, Dasht-e Arzhaneh, and Dasht-i- Arjan) is a village in, and the former capital of, Dasht-e Arzhan Rural District of Arzhan District, Shiraz County, Fars province, Iran. The capital of the rural district has been transferred to the village of Chehel Cheshmeh-ye Koruni. The village lies in an ecologically important zone, the Arzhan and Parishan Protected Area.

== History ==
In the past, the Arjan Plain was ruled by the Kadkhoda of that place called Molamouli, who was tortured by Mushir at that time, and after him was Ali Khan Kushk, who was killed by the Iranian army during the reign of Reza Shah Pahlavi.

== Demographics ==
=== Language ===
The main language spoken in the village is Persian.

=== Population ===
At the time of the 2006 National Census, the village's population was 2,557 residents in 585 households. The following census in 2011 counted 2,562 people in 721 households. The 2016 census measured the population of the village as 2,340 people in 693 households. It was the most populous village in its rural district.

== See also ==
- Arzhan Lake
- Lake Maharloo
