= Bisotun-e Bon Rud =

Bisotun-e Bon Rud بيستون بنرود
- Village
- Location within Iran
- Coordinates: 29°47′09″N 51°52′04″E
- Country: Iran
- Province: Fars
- County: Shiraz
- Bakhsh: Arzhan
- Rural District: Dasht-e Arzhan

Population (2006)
  - Total: 29
- Time zone: UTC+3:30 (IRST)
  - Summer (DST): UTC+4:30 (IRDT)

Bisotun-e Bon Rud (Persian: بيستون بنرود, also Romanized as Bīsotūn-e Bon Rūd; also known as Bīsotūn) is a village in Dasht-e Arzhan Rural District, Arzhan District, Shiraz County, Fars province, Iran. At the 2006 census, its population was 29, in 8 families.
