= Cheshmeh Seyyed Safari =

Cheshmeh Seyyed Safari چشمه سيدصفري
- Village
- Country: Iran
- Province: Fars
- County: Shiraz
- Bakhsh: Central
- Rural District: Qarah Bagh

Population (2006)
  - Total: 155
- Time zone: UTC+3:30 (IRST)
  - Summer (DST): UTC+4:30 (IRDT)

Cheshmeh Seyyed Safari (Persian: چشمه سيدصفري, also Romanized as Cheshmeh Seyyed Şafarī) is a village in Qarah Bagh Rural District, in the Central District of Shiraz County, Fars province, Iran. At the 2006 census, its population was 155, in 30 families.
