= Karreh Bas =

Karreh Bas كره بس
- Village
- Location within Iran
- Coordinates: 29°27′10″N 52°10′15″E
- Country: Iran
- Province: Fars
- County: Shiraz
- Bakhsh: Arzhan
- Rural District: Kuh Mareh Sorkhi

Population (2006)
  - Total: 353
- Time zone: UTC+3:30 (IRST)
  - Summer (DST): UTC+4:30 (IRDT)

Karreh Bas (Persian: كره بس, also Romanized as Kareh Bas; also known as Qarābast and Qareh Bast) is a village in Kuh Mareh Sorkhi Rural District, Arzhan District, Shiraz County, Fars province, Iran. At the 2006 census, its population was 353, in 73 families.
