= Kurazag-e Now =

Kurazag-e Now كورزگ نو
- Village
- Location within Iran
- Coordinates: 29°29′51″N 52°10′55″E
- Country: Iran
- Province: Fars
- County: Shiraz
- Bakhsh: Arzhan
- Rural District: Kuh Mareh Sorkhi

Population (2006)
  - Total: 379
- Time zone: UTC+3:30 (IRST)
  - Summer (DST): UTC+4:30 (IRDT)

Kurazag-e Now (Persian: كورزگ نو, also Romanized as Kūrazag-e Now; also known as Kūzarag and Kūzarak) is a village in Kuh Mareh Sorkhi Rural District, Arzhan District, Shiraz County, Fars province, Iran. At the 2006 census, its population was 379, in 78 families.
