= Bon Zard, Fars =

Bon Zard بن زرد
- Village
- Location within Iran
- Coordinates: 29°27′25″N 52°09′39″E
- Country: Iran
- Province: Fars
- County: Shiraz
- Bakhsh: Arzhan
- Rural District: Kuh Mareh Sorkhi

Population (2006)
  - Total: 134
- Time zone: UTC+3:30 (IRST)
  - Summer (DST): UTC+4:30 (IRDT)

Bon Zard (Persian: بن زرد; also known as Bamzar, Bem Zard, Bom Zard, and Bonah Zard) is a village in Kuh Mareh Sorkhi Rural District, Arzhan District, Shiraz County, Fars province, Iran. At the 2006 census, its population was 134, in 27 families.
