= Dārīyān =

Dārīyān may refer to:

- Dariyan, Iran
- Daryan (disambiguation), places in Iran
