= Qalat, Shiraz =

Historic village in Fars province, Iran

Qalat Persian: قلات
- Village
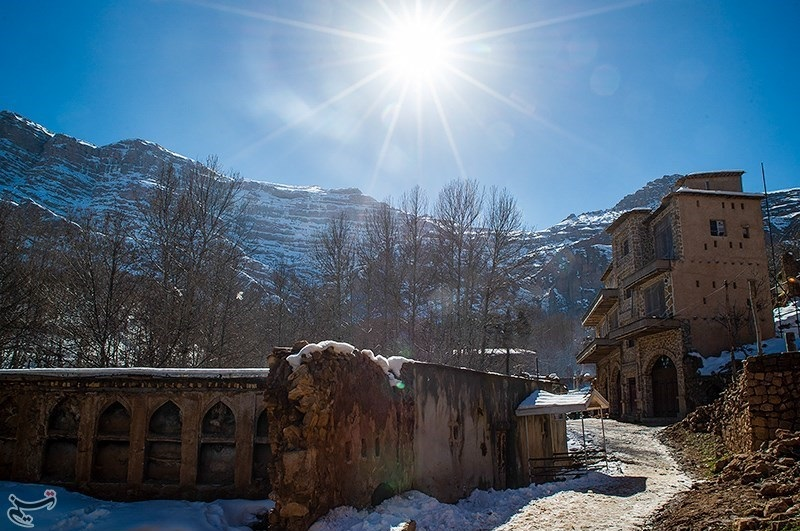
- Snowy day in Qalat village

- Location within Iran
- Coordinates: 29°49′10″N 52°19′44″E
- Country: Iran
- Province: Fars
- County: Shiraz
- District: Central
- Rural District: Derak
- Elevation: 2,065 m (6,775 ft)

Population (2016)
  - Total: 3,953
- Time zone: UTC+3:30 (IRST)

Qalat (Persian: قلات) (Note: Also romanized as Qalāt; also known as Kalāt) is a historic village and tourist site in Derak Rural District of the Central District of Shiraz County, Fars province, Iran. It is located approximately 36 kilometres northwest of Shiraz, in a mountainous area at an elevation of about 2,065 metres above sea level.

The village was inscribed on the National Heritage List of Iran on 8 May 2019 as the first rural historical-natural landscape in Fars province.

== Geography ==
Qalat lies at the foot of Sorgh Mountain (also known as Qalat Mountain), which encloses the village on three sides; the only access is from the north. The village sits at the coordinates 29°49′10″N 52°19′44″E at an elevation of approximately 2,065 metres. The climate is cool and pleasant in the first half of the year, and cold and snowy in the second half, making Qalat a popular summer destination for visitors from Shiraz.

== History ==
The village has a documented history of over one thousand years and was once a retreat for Persian kings, owing to its cool climate. After World War I, Qalat became a commercial stopover for Christian travellers passing through the region.

== Architecture ==
The village consists of an old quarter and a newer residential area. Houses in the old quarter are built from stone, mud brick, clay, plaster, and wood, and are arranged in a distinctive terraced, stepped pattern following the hillside. The old quarter is characterised by narrow winding lanes and clear-running streams. The newer section uses concrete, iron, and brick, and buildings are several storeys tall.

== Demographics ==
=== Population ===
At the time of the 2006 National Census, the village's population was 2,613 in 697 households. The following census in 2011 counted 2,988 people in 827 households. The 2016 census measured the population of the village as 3,953 people in 1,157 households. It was the most populous village in its rural district.

=== Language ===
The local dialect of Qalat is a surviving form of Southwestern Middle Persian, referred to locally as nim-lori or Parsineg.

== Economy ==
The inhabitants follow a semi-traditional way of life. Most are engaged in agriculture, animal husbandry, and horticulture, with some involved in trade and the craft of making giveh (traditional woven shoes).

== Natural attractions ==
Three natural waterfalls descend from the slopes of Sorgh Mountain on the outskirts of the village. The Shab-Shatari and Anjiri Spring rivers flow through the area and support diverse vegetation. Medicinal and wild plants found in the vicinity include yarrow (boomadaran), marshmallow (khatmi), maidenhair fern (parsiavshan), rhubarb, thistle, wild thyme, wild mint, savory, wild almond, catnip, borage, and lovage. The Shab-Shatari gorge and park lies approximately 2.5 kilometres from the old village core.

== Historical monuments ==
=== Qezel Arsalan Castle ===
The ruins of Qezel Arsalan Castle (Persian: قلعه قزل ارسلان) stand on the summit above the village. Remains of gypsum, stone, and lime mortar construction indicate a settlement dating to the Achaemenid and Parthian eras; the towers and battlements were later restored during the Seljuk period. Local tradition holds that the castle belonged to the Atabegs of Fars. The medieval poet Saadi referenced it in verse: "Qezel Arsalan had a formidable castle / whose neck rose above Mount Alvand".

=== Church of the Transfiguration of Christ ===
The Church of the Transfiguration of Christ (Persian: کلیسای تجلیل مسیح) stands in the northern part of the village. The building dates to the interwar period, when it was established by Christian missionaries for the local Christian community. Following the emigration of that community, the church fell into disrepair.

=== Other monuments ===
Additional historical structures include a Safavid-era mosque, Qajar-era water mills, a bathhouse from the Zand period, a traditional stone-paved bazaar, an ethnographic museum, and the village cemetery. A bathhouse in the old quarter is associated in local oral tradition with the poet Saadi.

== Gallery ==
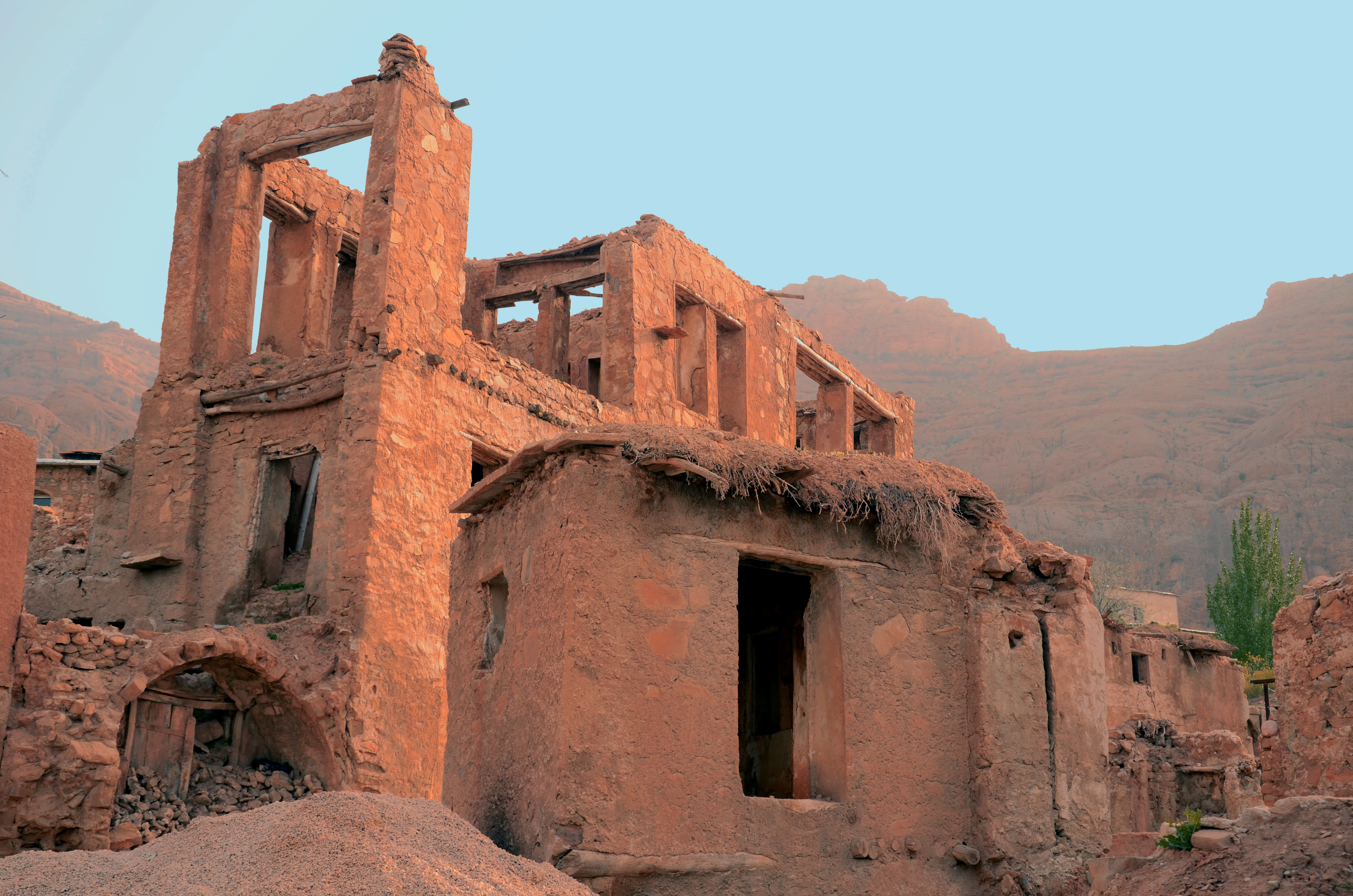

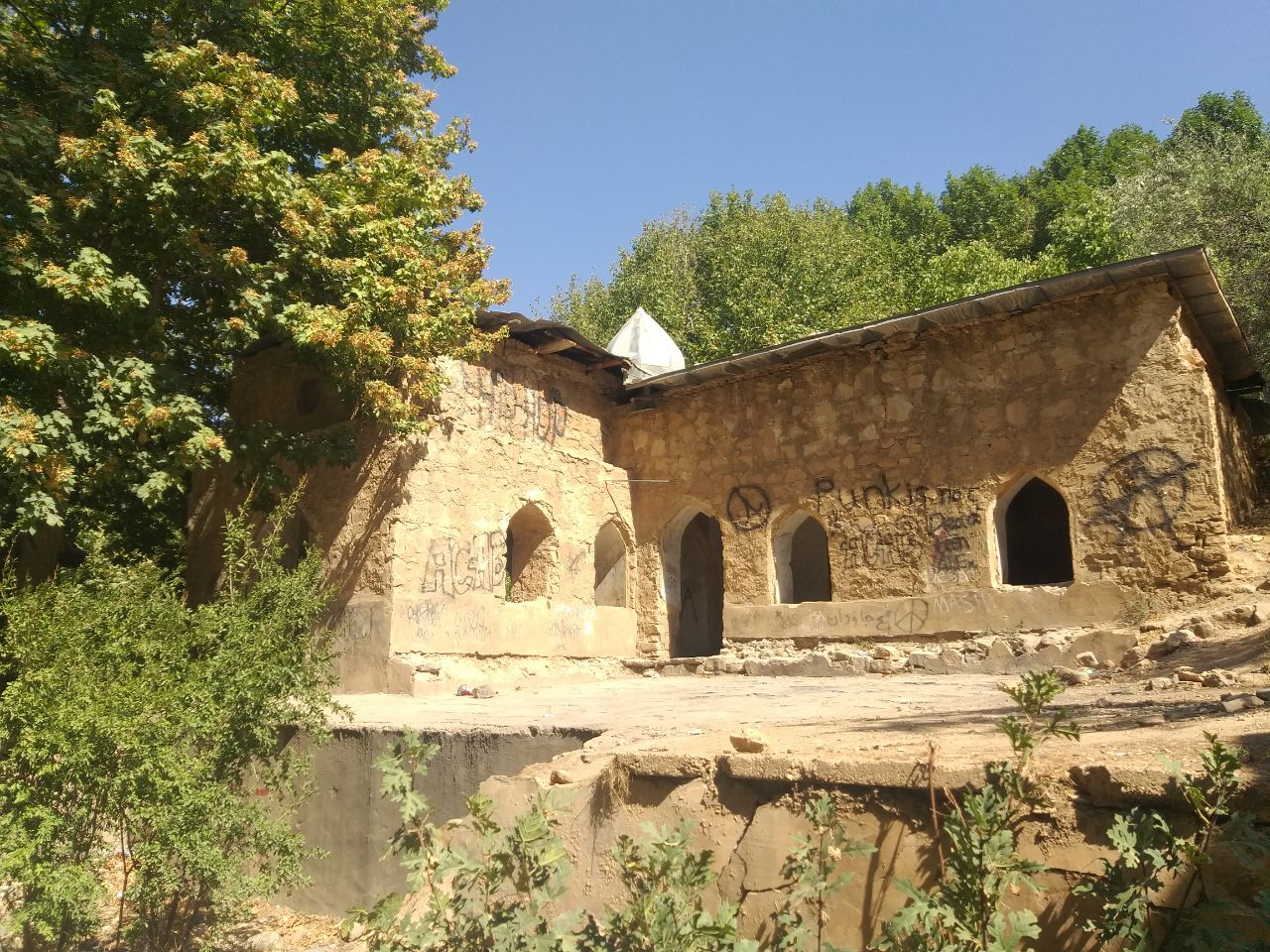
Church of the Transfiguration of Christ

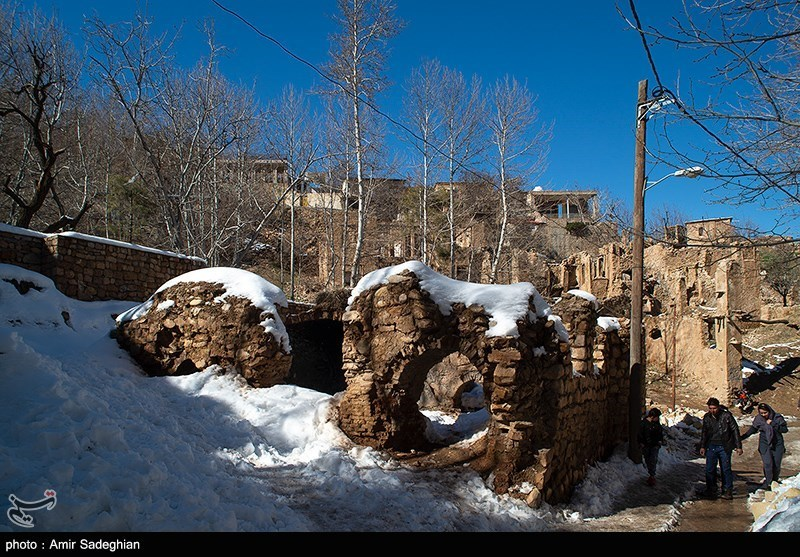

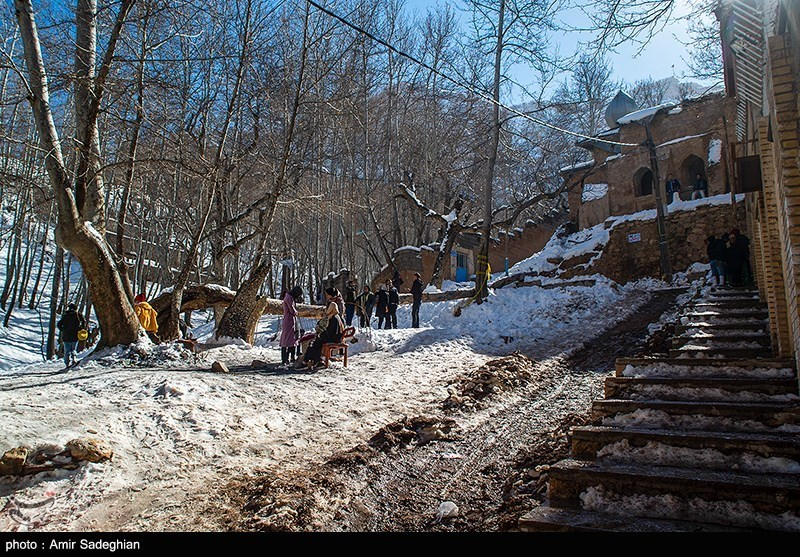

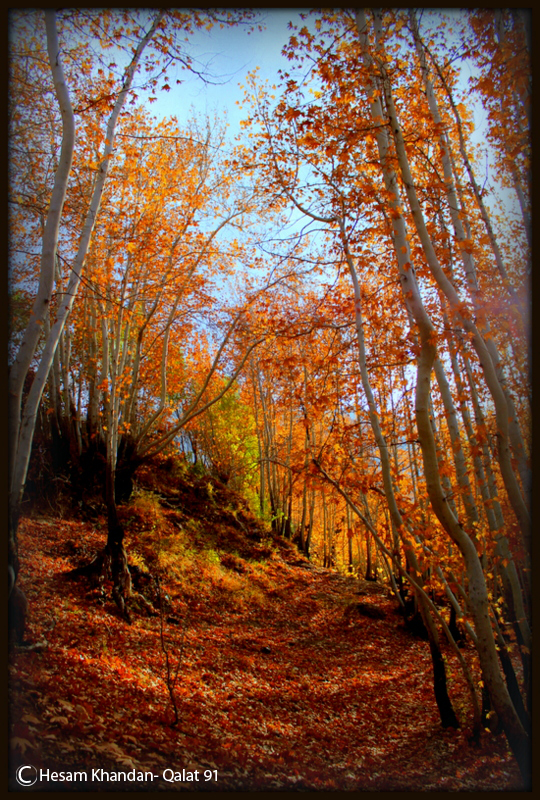

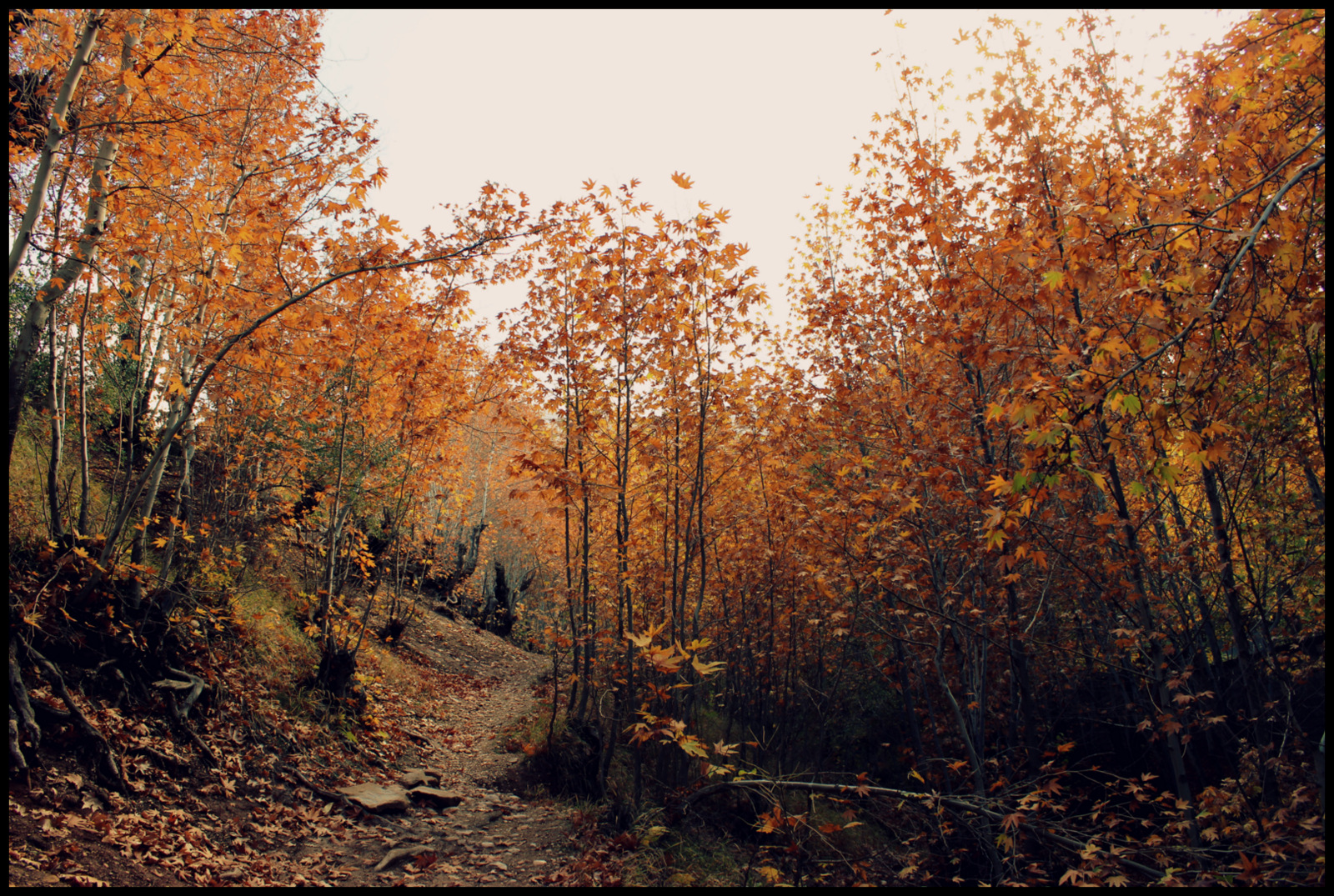

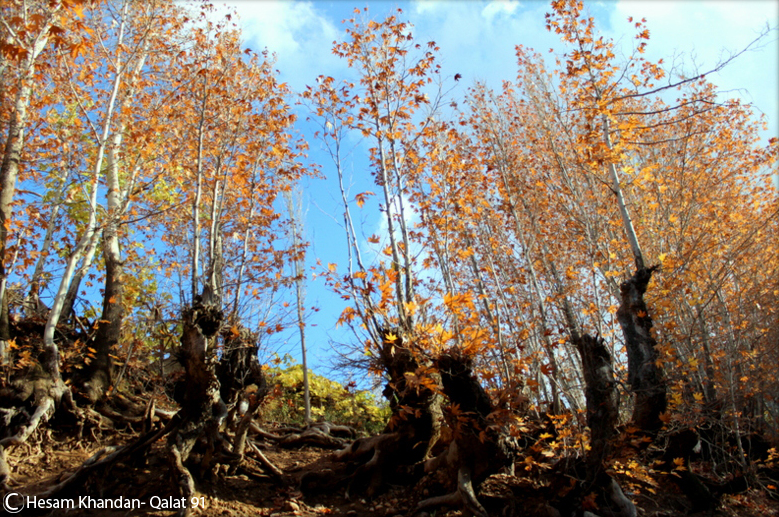

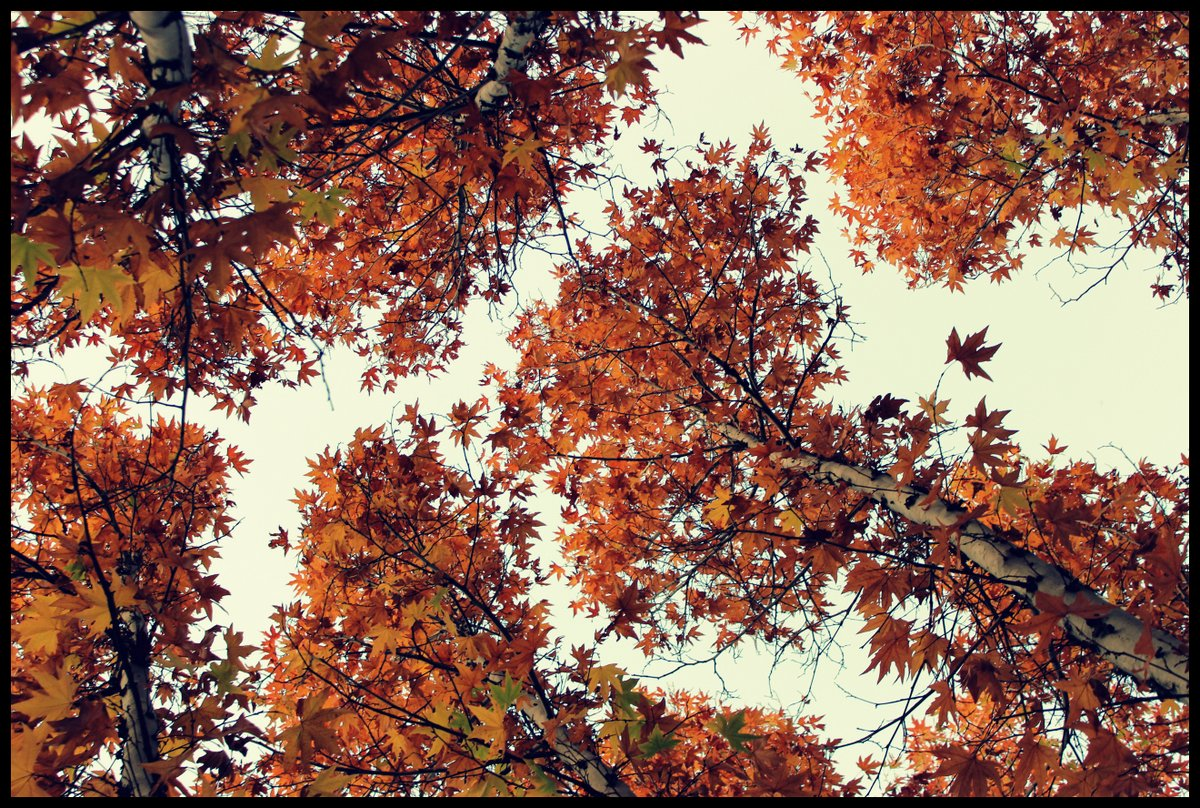

== See also ==
- Shiraz County
- Derak Rural District
- Qalat church
- Tourism in Iran
