= Barm Shur-e Sofla =

Barm Shur-e Sofla برمشورسفلي
- Village
- Location within Iran
- Coordinates: 29°27′31″N 52°41′21″E
- Country: Iran
- Province: Fars
- County: Shiraz
- Bakhsh: Central
- Rural District: Qarah Bagh

Population (2006)
  - Total: 444
- Time zone: UTC+3:30 (IRST)
  - Summer (DST): UTC+4:30 (IRDT)

Barm Shur-e Sofla (Persian: برمشورسفلي, also Romanized as Barm Shūr-e Soflá; also known as Bameru, Barm-e Shūr-e Pā’īn, Barm Shūr, and Barm Shūr-e Pā’īn) is a village in Qarah Bagh Rural District, in the Central District of Shiraz County, Fars province, Iran. At the 2006 census, its population was 444, in 97 families.
