= Tarbor-e Jafari =

Village in Fars province, Iran

Tarbor-e Jafari Persian: تربر جعفري
- Village
- Location within Iran
- Coordinates: 29°37′02″N 52°51′27″E
- Country: Iran
- Province: Fars
- County: Shiraz
- District: Darian
- Rural District: Tarbor

Population (2016)
  - Total: 1,795
- Time zone: UTC+3:30 (IRST)

Tarbor-e Jafari (Persian: تربرجعفري) (Note: Also romanized as Tarbor-e Ja‘farī; also known as Tarbor-e Bālā) is a village in, and the capital of, Tarbor Rural District in Darian District of Shiraz County, Fars province, Iran.

== Demographics ==
=== Population ===
At the time of the 2006 National Census, the village's population was 1,989 in 499 households, when it was in Darian Rural District of the Central District. The following census in 2011 counted 2,103 people in 601 households. The 2016 census measured the population of the village as 1,795 people in 559 households. It was the most populous village in its rural district.

In 2024, the rural district was separated from the district in the formation of Darian District, and Tarbor-e Jafari was transferred to Tarbor Rural District created in the new district.
