= Belhezar =

Belhezar (Persian: بلهزار) may refer to:

- Belhezar-e Bala
- Belhezar-e Pain
