= Fathabad-e Sofla, Shiraz =

Fathabad-e Sofla فتح ابادسفلي
- Village
- Location within Iran
- Coordinates: 29°19′31″N 52°08′19″E
- Country: Iran
- Province: Fars
- County: Shiraz
- Bakhsh: Arzhan
- Rural District: Kuh Mareh Sorkhi

Population (2006)
  - Total: 208
- Time zone: UTC+3:30 (IRST)
  - Summer (DST): UTC+4:30 (IRDT)

Fathabad-e Sofla (Persian: فتح ابادسفلي, also Romanized as Fatḩābād-e Soflá) is a village in Kuh Mareh Sorkhi Rural District, Arzhan District, Shiraz County, Fars province, Iran. At the 2006 census, its population was 208, in 44 families.
