= Shahpur Jan =

Village in Fars province, Iran

Shahpur Jan Persian: شاهپور جان
- Village
- Location within Iran
- Coordinates: 29°31′56″N 52°28′01″E
- Country: Iran
- Province: Fars
- County: Shiraz
- District: Central
- Rural District: Qarah Bagh

Population (2016)
  - Total: 10,280
- Time zone: UTC+3:30 (IRST)

Shahpur Jan (Persian: شاهپورجان) (Note: Also romanized as Shāhpūr Jān and Shāhpūrjān; also known as Shāpūr Jān) is a village in Qarah Bagh Rural District of the Central District of Shiraz County, Fars province, Iran.

== Demographics ==
=== Population ===
At the time of the 2006 National Census, the village's population was 2,860 in 648 households. The following census in 2011 counted 5,531 people in 1,507 households. The 2016 census measured the population of the village as 10,280 people in 2,920 households. It was the most populous village in its rural district.
