= Romeghan =

Village in Fars province, Iran

Romeghan Persian: رمغان
- Village
- Location within Iran
- Coordinates: 29°22′31″N 52°09′50″E
- Country: Iran
- Province: Fars
- County: Shiraz
- District: Arzhan
- Rural District: Kuh Mareh Sorkhi

Population (2016)
  - Total: 764
- Time zone: UTC+3:30 (IRST)

Romeghan (Persian: رمغان) (Note: Also romanized as Romeghān; also known as Rāngūn, Romeqān, and Romqān) is a village in Kuh Mareh Sorkhi Rural District of Arzhan District, Shiraz County, Fars province, Iran.

== Demographics ==
=== Population ===
At the time of the 2006 National Census, the village's population wa 838 in 193 households. The following census in 2011 counted 832 people in 220 households. The 2016 census measured the population of the village as 764 people in 229 households. It was the most populous village in its rural district.
