= Kheyrabad, Arzhan =

Village in Fars province, Iran

Kheyrabad Persian: خيراباد
- Village
- Location within Iran
- Coordinates: 29°39′59″N 52°10′55″E
- Country: Iran
- Province: Fars
- County: Shiraz
- District: Arzhan
- Rural District: Qarah Chaman

Population (2016)
  - Total: 1,589
- Time zone: UTC+3:30 (IRST)

Kheyrabad (Persian: خيراباد) (Note: Also romanized as Kheyrābād) is a village in Qarah Chaman Rural District of Arzhan District, Shiraz County, Fars province, Iran.

== Demographics ==
=== Population ===
At the time of the 2006 National Census, the village's population was 981 in 203 households. The following census in 2011 counted 1,344 people in 317 households. The 2016 census measured the population of the village as 1,589 people in 426 households. It was the most populous village in its rural district.
