= Tarbor-e Sadat =

Tarbor-e Sadat تربرسادات
- Village
- Location within Iran
- Coordinates: 29°36′59″N 52°52′39″E
- Country: Iran
- Province: Fars
- County: Shiraz
- Bakhsh: Central
- Rural District: Darian

Population (2006)
  - Total: 421
- Time zone: UTC+3:30 (IRST)
  - Summer (DST): UTC+4:30 (IRDT)

Tarbor-e Sadat (Persian: تربرسادات, also Romanized as Tarbor-e Sādāt and Tarbor Sādāt; also known as Tarboré Sadat and Tarbor-e Seyyedhā) is a village in Darian Rural District, in the Central District of Shiraz County, Fars province, Iran. At the 2006 census, its population was 421, in 117 families.
