= Bezin, Fars =

Bezin بزين
- Village
- Location within Iran
- Coordinates: 29°45′16″N 52°24′49″E
- Country: Iran
- Province: Fars
- County: Shiraz
- Bakhsh: Central
- Rural District: Derak

Population (2006)
  - Total: 6,812
- Time zone: UTC+3:30 (IRST)
  - Summer (DST): UTC+4:30 (IRDT)

Bezin (Persian: بزين, also Romanized as Bezīn and Bezeyn) is a village in Derak Rural District, in the Central District of Shiraz County, Fars province, Iran. At the 2006 census, its population was 6,812, in 1,700 families.
