= Tarbor-e Lay Bisheh =

Tarbor-e Lay Bisheh تربرلاي بيشه
- Village
- Location within Iran
- Coordinates: 29°36′34″N 52°53′59″E
- Country: Iran
- Province: Fars
- County: Shiraz
- Bakhsh: Central
- Rural District: Darian

Population (2006)
  - Total: 1,491
- Time zone: UTC+3:30 (IRST)
  - Summer (DST): UTC+4:30 (IRDT)

Tarbor-e Lay Bisheh (Persian: تربرلاي بيشه, also Romanized as Tarbor-e Lāy Bīsheh; also known as Tarbor-e Pā’īn) is a village in Darian Rural District, in the Central District of Shiraz County, Fars province, Iran. At the 2006 census, its population was 1,491, in 320 families.
