= Soltanabad, Shiraz =

Village in Fars province, Iran

Soltanabad Persian: سلطان اباد
- Village
- Location within Iran
- Coordinates: 29°31′55″N 52°32′50″E
- Country: Iran
- Province: Fars
- County: Shiraz
- District: Central
- Rural District: Qarah Bagh

Population (2016)
  - Total: 8,734
- Time zone: UTC+3:30 (IRST)

Soltanabad (Persian: سلطان اباد) (Note: Also romanized as Solţānābād; also known as Soltan Abad Hoomeh and Solţānābād-e Ḩūmeh) is a village in, and the capital of, Qarah Bagh Rural District of the Central District of Shiraz County, Fars province, Iran.

== Demographics ==
=== Population ===
At the time of the 2006 National Census, the village's population was 3,383 in 824 households. The following census in 2011 counted 4,977 people in 1,408 households. The 2016 census measured the population of the village as 8,734 people in 2,524 households.
