= Barm Shur =

Barm Shur (Persian: برمشور) may refer to:

- Barm Shur-e Olya
- Barm Shur-e Sofla
