= Chehel Cheshmeh-ye Koruni =

Village in Fars province, Iran

Chehel Cheshmeh-ye Koruni Persian: چهل چشمه كروني
- Village
- Location within Iran
- Coordinates: 29°42′27″N 52°01′25″E
- Country: Iran
- Province: Fars
- County: Shiraz
- District: Arzhan
- Rural District: Dasht-e Arzhan

Population (2016)
  - Total: 1,010
- Time zone: UTC+3:30 (IRST)

Chehel Cheshmeh-ye Koruni (Persian: چهل چشمه كروني) (Note: Also romanized as Chehel Cheshmeh-ye Korūnī; also known as Chehel Cheshmeh) is a village in, and the capital of, Dasht-e Arzhan Rural District of Arzhan District, Shiraz County, Fars province, Iran. The previous capital of the rural district was the village of Dasht-e Arzhan.

== Demographics ==
=== Population ===
At the time of the 2006 National Census, the village's population was 1,164 in 231 households. The following census in 2011 counted 1,189 people in 311 households. The 2016 census measured the population of the village as 1,010 people in 272 households.
