= Belhezar-e Pain =

Belhezar-e Pain بلهزارپائين
- Village
- Location within Iran
- Coordinates: 29°50′32″N 52°01′12″E
- Country: Iran
- Province: Fars
- County: Shiraz
- Bakhsh: Arzhan
- Rural District: Qarah Chaman

Population (2006)
  - Total: 33
- Time zone: UTC+3:30 (IRST)
  - Summer (DST): UTC+4:30 (IRDT)

Belhezar-e Pain (Persian: بلهزارپائين, also Romanized as Belhezār-e Pā’īn; also known as Belhezar-e Soflá) is a village in Qarah Chaman Rural District, Arzhan District, Shiraz County, Fars province, Iran. At the 2006 census, its population was 33, in 9 families.
