= Barm Shur-e Olya =

Barm Shur-e Olya برمشورعليا
- Village
- Location within Iran
- Coordinates: 29°27′14″N 52°40′21″E
- Country: Iran
- Province: Fars
- County: Shiraz
- Bakhsh: Central
- Rural District: Qarah Bagh

Population (2006)
  - Total: 957
- Time zone: UTC+3:30 (IRST)
  - Summer (DST): UTC+4:30 (IRDT)

Barm Shur-e Olya (Persian: برمشورعليا, also Romanized as Barm Shūr-e 'Olyā; also known as Barm-e Shūr-e Bālā and Barm Shūr-e Bālā) is a village in Qarah Bagh Rural District, in the Central District of Shiraz County, Fars province, Iran. At the 2006 census, its population was 957, comprising 236 families.
