= Bajgah, Shiraz =

Bajgah باجگاه
- Village
- Location within Iran
- Coordinates: 29°43′09″N 52°35′28″E
- Country: Iran
- Province: Fars
- County: Shiraz
- Bakhsh: Central
- Rural District: Derak

Population (2006)
  - Total: 2,188
- Time zone: UTC+3:30 (IRST)
  - Summer (DST): UTC+4:30 (IRDT)

Bajgah (Persian: باجگاه, also Romanized as Bājgāh; also known as Bachke Sarāy) is a village in Derak Rural District, in the Central District of Shiraz County, Fars province, Iran. At the 2006 census, its population was 2,188, in 554 families.
