= Bamzar =

Bamzar (Persian: بامزار or بمزر) may refer to:

- Bamzar, Fars (بمزر - Bamzar)
- Bamzar, Khuzestan (بامزار - Bāmzār)
