= Belhezar-e Bala =

Belhezar-e Bala بلهزاربالا
- Village
- Location within Iran
- Coordinates: 29°50′08″N 52°00′58″E
- Country: Iran
- Province: Fars
- County: Shiraz
- Bakhsh: Arzhan
- Rural District: Qarah Chaman

Population (2006)
  - Total: 109
- Time zone: UTC+3:30 (IRST)
  - Summer (DST): UTC+4:30 (IRDT)

Belhezar-e Bala (Persian: بلهزاربالا, also Romanized as Belhezār-e Bālā; also known as Belhezar-e 'Olyā) is a village in Qarah Chaman Rural District, Arzhan District, Shiraz County, Fars province, Iran. At the 2006 census, its population was 109, in 29 families.
