= Morghan =

Morghan مرغان
- Village
- Location within Iran
- Coordinates: 29°33′41″N 52°39′00″E
- Country: Iran
- Province: Fars
- County: Shiraz
- Bakhsh: Central
- Rural District: Kaftarak

Population (2006)
  - Total: 5,660
- Time zone: UTC+3:30 (IRST)
  - Summer (DST): UTC+4:30 (IRDT)

Morghan (Persian: مرغان, also Romanized as Morghān; also known as Morghūn) is a village in Kaftarak Rural District, in the Central District of Shiraz County, Fars province, Iran. At the 2006 census, its population was 5,660, in 1,506 families.
