= Bajgah =

Bajgah (Persian: باجگاه) may refer to:

- Bajgah, Mamasani
- Bajgah, Shiraz
