= Chenarak =

Chenarak or Chanarak (Persian: چنارك) may refer to:

- Chenarak, Fars
- Chenarak, Razavi Khorasan
- Chenarak, Yazd
