= Mah-e Firuzan =

Village in Fars province, Iran

Mah-e Firuzan Persian: ماه فيروزان
- Village
- Location within Iran
- Coordinates: 29°34′10″N 52°39′38″E
- Country: Iran
- Province: Fars
- County: Shiraz
- District: Central
- Rural District: Kaftarak

Population (2016)
  - Total: 3,203
- Time zone: UTC+3:30 (IRST)

Mah-e Firuzan (Persian: ماه فيروزان) (Note: Also romanized as Māh-e Fīrūzān; also known as Fīrūzān and Māh Parvīzān) is a village in Kaftarak Rural District of the Central District of Shiraz County, Fars province, Iran.

== Demographics ==
=== Population ===
At the time of the 2006 National Census, the village's population was 498 in 134 households. The following census in 2011 counted 1,078 people in 310 households. The 2016 census measured the population of the village as 3,203 people in 976 households. It was the most populous village in its rural district.
