= Nasrabad, Shiraz =

Neighborhood in Fars province, Iran

Nasrabad Persian: نصراباد
- Neighborhood
- Location within Iran
- Coordinates: 29°34′59″N 52°38′38″E
- Country: Iran
- Province: Fars
- County: Shiraz
- District: Central
- City: Shiraz

Population (2006)
  - Total: 4,293
- Time zone: UTC+3:30 (IRST)

Nasrabad (Persian: نصراباد) (Note: Also romanized as Naşrābād) is a neighborhood of the city of Shiraz in the Central District of Shiraz County, Fars province, Iran. It served as the capital of Kaftarak Rural District until its administrative center was transferred to Shiraz.

== Demographics ==
=== Population ===
At the time of the 2006 National Census, Nasrabad's population was 4,293 in 1,061 households, when it was a village in Kaftarak Rural District. After the census, Nasrabad was absorbed by the city of Shiraz.
