= Richi, Iran =

Village in Fars province, Iran

Richi Persian: ريچي
- Village
- Location within Iran
- Coordinates: 29°30′03″N 52°10′15″E
- Country: Iran
- Province: Fars
- County: Shiraz
- District: Arzhan
- Rural District: Kuh Mareh Sorkhi

Population (2016)
  - Total: 272
- Time zone: UTC+3:30 (IRST)

Richi (Persian: ريچي) (Note: Also romanized as Rīchī; also known as Rechī, Rījī, and Rīshī) is a village in, and the capital of, Kuh Mareh Sorkhi Rural District of Arzhan District, Shiraz County, Fars province, Iran.

== Demographics ==
=== Population ===
At the time of the 2006 National Census, the village's population was 439 in 95 households. The following census in 2011 counted 282 people in 78 households. The 2016 census measured the population of the village as 272 people in 82 households.
