= Fathabad-e Sofla =

Fathabad-e Sofla (Persian: فتح ابادسفلي) may refer to:

- Fathabad-e Sofla, Marvdasht
- Fathabad-e Sofla, Shiraz
