= Keraj =

Keraj (Persian: كرارج) may refer to:

- Keraj, Fars
- Keraj Rural District, in Isfahan Province
