= Daryan =

Daryan or Darian or Dareyan or Dariyan (Persian: داريان) may also refer to:

- Daryan, East Azerbaijan, a little city in East Azerbaijan Province
- Darian, Iran, a city in Fars Province
- Darian, Kermanshah, a village in Kermanshah Province
- Darian Rural District, in Fars Province
- Daryan Selvy (born 1979), American basketball player
