= Richi =

Richi may refer to:

- Richi, Iran, a village in Fars Province, Iran
- Richi Lake, Belarus, Latvia
- Ricardo Pérez de Zabalza Goytre (born 1977), Spanish former football winger
- Richi Puspita Dili (born 1989), Indonesian badminton player
- Richi Solaiman, Bangladeshi actress
