= Bazin, Iran =

Bazin or Bezin or Bozin or Bezeyn (Persian: بزين) may refer to:

- Bezin, Fars
- Bazin, Zanjan
