= Morghun =

Morghun (Persian: مرغون) may refer to:

- Morghun, Firuzabad
- Morghun, Shiraz
