= Maharloo Lake =

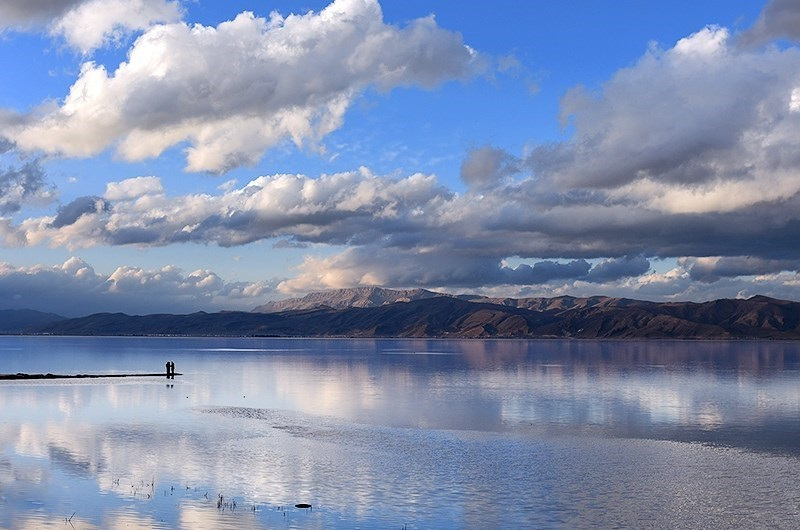

- Location within Iran
- Interactive map of Maharloo Lake
- Location: south of Shiraz urban
- Coordinates: 29°28′N 52°48′E
- Type: Seasonal salt lake
- Primary inflows: Dry river, Soltanabad river (seasonal)
- Basin countries: Iran
- Surface area: 600 km^{2} (230 sq mi)
- Max. depth: ca. 100 m (330 ft)
- Surface elevation: 1,500 m (4,900 ft)
- Islands: none
- Settlements: Shiraz

Maharloo Lake (Persian: دریاچه مهارلو) is a seasonal and endorheic hypersaline wetland in the highlands of Iran, 27.0 km (16.8 miles) southeast of the city of Shiraz in Fars province. It is surrounded lengthwise by up to 2,000 m high mountains. The lake shore has an altitude of 1460 m and spans approximately 600 square kilometers, though its size can vary significantly depending on the season. The lake salt is rich in potassium and other salts.

Rudkhane-ye-Khoshk, a seasonal river flowing through the city of Shiraz, brings most of the flood water to the lake bed during intensive precipitation events. The lake water typically evaporates by the end of summer and exposes the white lake bed. By mid-summer and due to high evaporation rates and salt concentrations, the lake water turns pinkish red as a result of the red tide within the lake.

== Biodiversity ==
The ecosystem of Maharloo Lake is essential for wildlife and migratory birds. Ecologically, the lake is a vital habitat for various species of migratory birds, including ducks, flamingos, and pelicans. These birds travel to the area in different seasons, adding to the lake’s ecological diversity. If environmental conditions are favorable, these birds stay in the wetlands of Fars, including Maharloo Lake, until mid-autumn. The most prominent bird species in the lake is the flamingo.

In addition to flamingos, birds such as grebes, gannets, various ducks, as well as greater flamingos, herons, Mallard, Stilt sandpiper, small grebes and various types of grebes live in this lagoon. But as for fish, no fish live in this lake due to the excessive salinity of the water. However, reptiles such as lizards, geckos, snakes and turtles are found in the surrounding area. There are also some amphibians near this lake and some diverse animal species such as jackals, wild cats, hyenas and foxes around Maharloo.

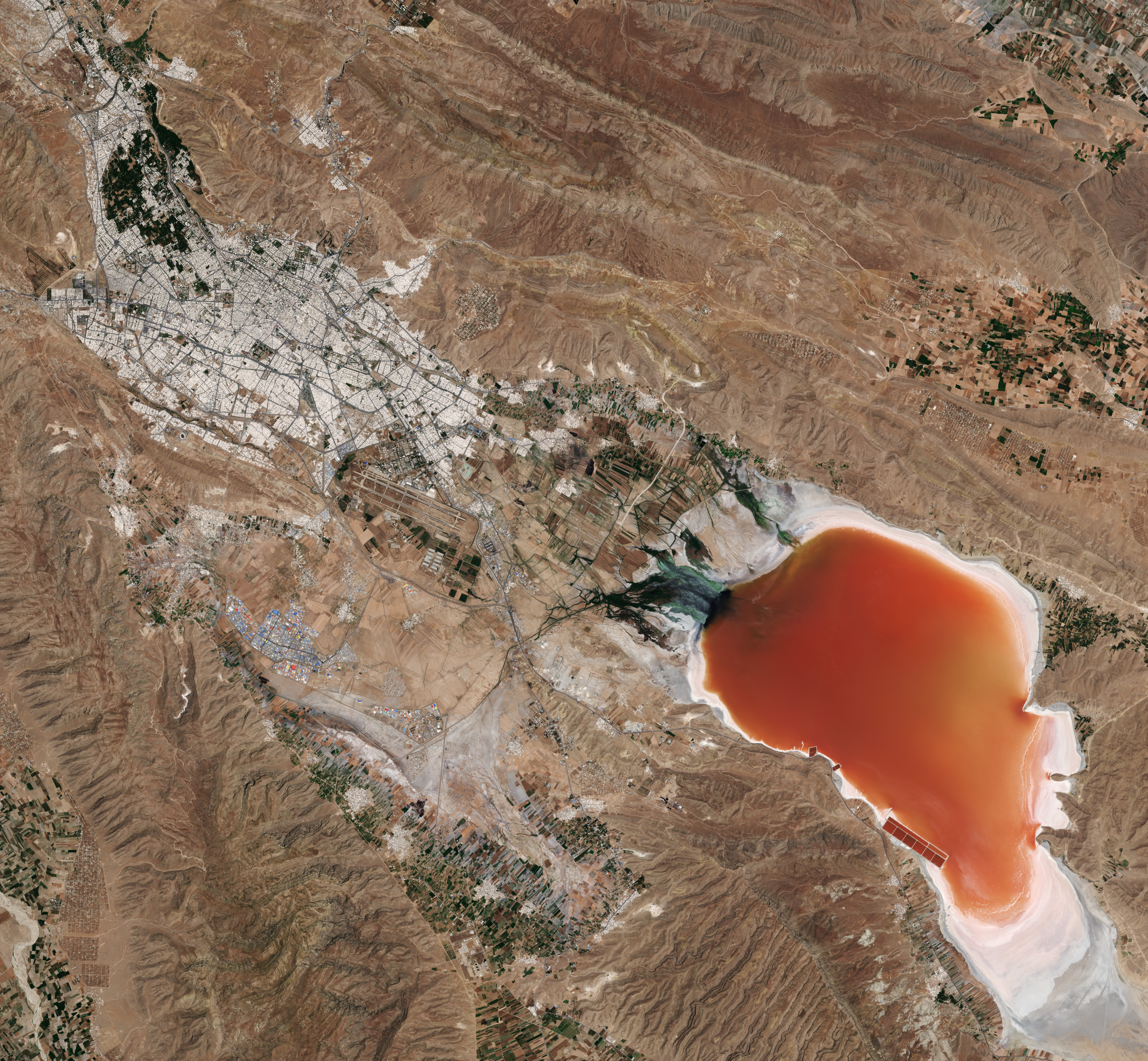
European Space Agency photo of Shiraz and Maharloo Lake

== See also ==
- Dasht-e Arzhan
- Lake Parishan
