= Khaneh Zenyan =

City in Fars province, Iran

Khaneh Zenyan Persian: خانه زنيان
- City
- Location within Iran
- Coordinates: 29°40′22″N 52°09′10″E
- Country: Iran
- Province: Fars
- County: Shiraz
- District: Arzhan

Population (2016)
  - Total: 4,027
- Time zone: UTC+3:30 (IRST)

Khaneh Zenyan (Persian: خانه زنيان) (Note: Also romanized as Khāneh Zenyān and Khāneh-ye Zenyān; also known as Khān-e Zenyān and Khān-i-Ziniān) is a city in, and the capital of Arzhan District of Shiraz County, Fars province, Iran. It also serves as the administrative center for Qarah Chaman Rural District.

== Demographics ==
=== Population ===
At the time of the 2006 National Census, Khaneh Zenyan's population was 1,578 in 350 households, when it was a village in Qarah Chaman Rural District. The following census in 2011 counted 3,370 people in 804 households, by which time the village had been elevated to the status of a city. The 2016 census measured the population of the city as 4,027 people in 1,139 households.

== Climate ==
Climate data for Khaneh Zenyan
Month	Jan	Feb	Mar	Apr	May	Jun	Jul	Aug	Sep	Oct	Nov	Dec	Year
Mean daily maximum °C (°F)	9.4 (48.9)	11.7 (53.1)	15.7 (60.3)	19.0 (66.2)	26.8 (80.2)	32.2 (90.0)	35.0 (95.0)	34.3 (93.7)	31.6 (88.9)	25.8 (78.4)	18.4 (65.1)	12.8 (55.0)	22.7 (72.9)
Mean daily minimum °C (°F)	−3.1 (26.4)	−1.4 (29.5)	1.0 (33.8)	4.5 (40.1)	9.8 (49.6)	13.5 (56.3)	17.3 (63.1)	16.2 (61.2)	12.4 (54.3)	7.4 (45.3)	2.1 (35.8)	−0.3 (31.5)	6.6 (43.9)
Average precipitation mm (inches)	79 (3.1)	57 (2.2)	53 (2.1)	31 (1.2)	7 (0.3)	1 (0.0)	2 (0.1)	1 (0.0)	1 (0.0)	8 (0.3)	29 (1.1)	54 (2.1)	323 (12.7)
Source: Climate-data.org
