= Sadra, Fars =

City in Fars province, Iran

Coordinates: 29.8069°N 52.5036°E

Sadra صدرا
- City
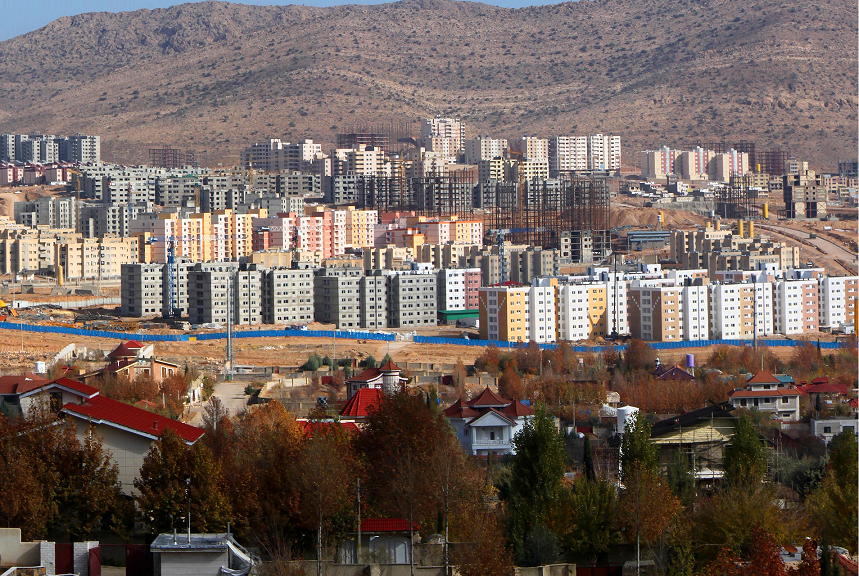
- Sadra

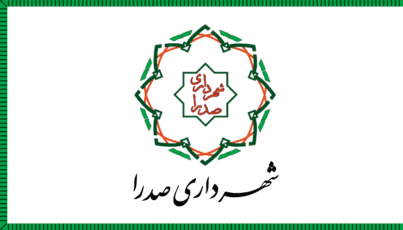
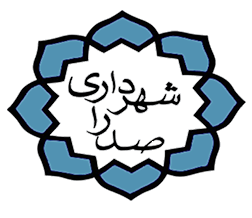
- Flag Seal
- Interactive map of Sadra
- Location within Iran
- Country: Iran
- Province: Fars
- County: Shiraz
- Bakhsh: Central

Population (2019 estimate)
  - Total: 122,226
- Time zone: UTC+3:30 (IRST)
- Website: sadracity.ir

Sadra (Persian: صدرا) is a planned city in the Central District of Shiraz County, Fars province, Iran. With a population of 122,226 (2019), Sadra is the fourth most populous city of the province. it is located 15 kilometres (9.3 mi) northwest of Shiraz, in “Ahu-char Plain”, which is more than 300 metres (980 ft) higher than Shiraz.

== History ==
Sadra's studies and design began in 1989 and eventually, the comprehensive plan of the city was approved by the "Supreme Council of Urban Planning and Architecture of Iran" in February 1995. Sadra was upgraded to a city in 2009 due to population growth and development.

== Demographics ==
=== Population ===
At the time of the 2011 National Census, the city's population was 39,979 people in 11,419 households. The 2016 census measured the population of the city as 91,863 people in 28,741 households.

== Education and healthcare ==
Academic campuses are located in Sadra, including Shiraz University of Medical Sciences, Islamic Azad University, Shiraz Branch, and Shiraz University of Technology. Sadra also is a medical hub and home to Abu Ali Sina organ transplant hospital, Amir ol-momenin burn hospital, Sadra psychiatric hospital, Sadra oncology hospital, and Khatam ol-anbia heart hospital.
