= Badam Zar, Dehdez =

Badam Zar بادام زار
- Village
- Location within Iran
- Coordinates: 31°49′02″N 50°04′06″E
- Country: Iran
- Province: Khuzestan
- County: Izeh
- Bakhsh: Dehdez
- Rural District: Donbaleh Rud-e Shomali

Population (2006)
  - Total: 187
- Time zone: UTC+3:30 (IRST)
  - Summer (DST): UTC+4:30 (IRDT)

Badam Zar (Persian: بادام زار, also Romanized as Bādām Zār) is a village in Donbaleh Rud-e Shomali Rural District, Dehdez District, Izeh County, Khuzestan Province, Iran. At the 2006 census, its population was 187, in 28 families.
