= Badam Zar, Bushehr =

Badam Zar بادام زار
- Village
- Location within Iran
- Coordinates: 28°41′32″N 51°20′48″E
- Country: Iran
- Province: Bushehr
- County: Dashti
- Bakhsh: Central
- Rural District: Markazi

Population (2006)
  - Total: 144
- Time zone: UTC+3:30 (IRST)
  - Summer (DST): UTC+4:30 (IRDT)

Badam Zar (Persian: بادام زار, also Romanized as Bādām Zār and Bādāmzār) is a village in Markazi Rural District, in the Central District of Dashti County, Bushehr Province, Iran. At the 2006 census, its population was 144, in 33 families.
