= Bajgah, Mamasani =

Bajgah باجگاه
- Village
- Location within Iran
- Coordinates: 30°09′48″N 51°31′55″E
- Country: Iran
- Province: Fars
- County: Mamasani
- Bakhsh: Central
- Rural District: Javid-e Mahuri

Population (2006)
  - Total: 975
- Time zone: UTC+3:30 (IRST)
  - Summer (DST): UTC+4:30 (IRDT)

Bajgah (Persian: باجگاه, also Romanized as Bājgāh) is a village in Javid-e Mahuri Rural District, in the Central District of Mamasani County, Fars province, Iran. At the 2006 census, its population was 1289, in 218 families.
