= Chenarak, Yazd =

Chenarak چنارك
- Village
- Location within Iran
- Coordinates: 31°40′18″N 53°50′49″E
- Country: Iran
- Province: Yazd
- County: Taft
- Bakhsh: Central
- Rural District: Aliabad

Population (2006)
  - Total: 9
- Time zone: UTC+3:30 (IRST)
  - Summer (DST): UTC+4:30 (IRDT)

Chenarak (Persian: چنارك, romanized: Chenārak) is a village in Aliabad Rural District, in the Central District of Taft County, Yazd Province, Iran. At the 2006 census, its population was 9, in 4 families.
