= Dasht-e Arzhan Rural District =

Rural district in Fars province, Iran

Dasht-e Arzhan Rural District Persian: دهستان دشت ارژن
- Rural District
- Location within Iran
- Coordinates: 29°41′47″N 51°55′29″E
- Country: Iran
- Province: Fars
- County: Shiraz
- District: Arzhan
- Capital: Chehel Cheshmeh-ye Koruni

Population (2016)
  - Total: 4,571
- Time zone: UTC+3:30 (IRST)

Dasht-e Arzhan Rural District (Persian: دهستان دشت ارژن) is in Arzhan District of Shiraz County, Fars province, Iran. Its capital is the village of Chehel Cheshmeh-ye Koruni. The previous capital of the rural district was the village of Dasht-e Arzhan.

== Demographics ==
=== Population ===
At the time of the 2006 National Census, the rural district's population was 4,901 in 1,089 households. There were 4,882 inhabitants in 1,362 households at the following census of 2011. The 2016 census measured the population of the rural district as 4,571 in 1,331 households. The most populous of its 36 villages was Dasht-e Arzhan, with 2,340 people.

== See also ==
- The protected area of Arzhan and Parishan
