= Badamzar, Izeh =

Badamzar بادام زار
- Village
- Location within Iran
- Coordinates: 31°56′52″N 49°48′45″E
- Country: Iran
- Province: Khuzestan
- County: Izeh
- Bakhsh: Central
- Rural District: Pian

Population (2006)
  - Total: 140
- Time zone: UTC+3:30 (IRST)
  - Summer (DST): UTC+4:30 (IRDT)

Badamzar (Persian: بادام زار, also Romanized as Bādāmzār; also known as Bāmazar and Bāmzār) is a village in Pian Rural District, in the Central District of Izeh County, Khuzestan Province, Iran. At the 2006 census, its population was 140, in 19 families.
