= Darian District =

District in Fars province, Iran

Darian District Persian: بخش داریان
- District
- Location within Iran
- Coordinates: 29°34′27″N 52°50′04″E
- Country: Iran
- Province: Fars
- County: Shiraz
- Capital: Darian
- Time zone: UTC+3:30 (IRST)

Darian District (Persian: بخش داریان) is in Shiraz County, Fars province, Iran. Its capital is the city of Darian, whose population at the time of the 2016 National Census was 10,037 people in 3,021 households.

== History ==
In 2024, Darian Rural District and the city of Darian were separated from the Central District in the formation of Darian District.

== Demographics ==
=== Administrative divisions ===
Darian District
Administrative Divisions
Darian RD
Tarbor RD
Darian (city)
RD = Rural District
