= Lake Parishan =

Lake in Fars province, Iran

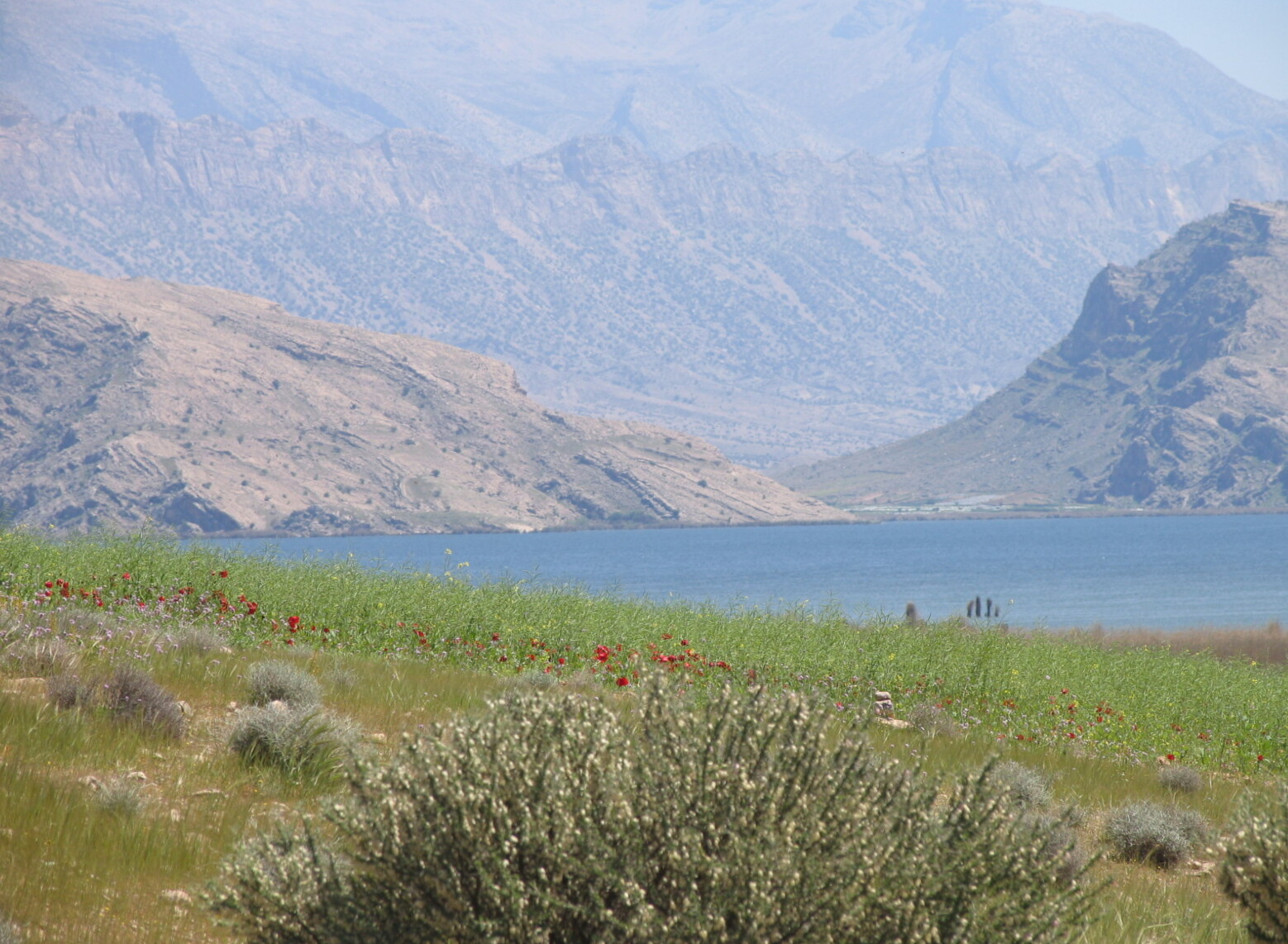
- Lake Parishan

- Location within Iran
- Interactive map of Lake Parishan
- Coordinates: 29°30′21″N 51°48′12″E
- Type: Lake
- Primary inflows: rain
- Primary outflows: none
- Surface area: 266.5 square metres (2,869 sq ft)
- Surface elevation: 820 metres (2,690 ft)
- Settlements: Jereh and Baladeh, Fars province, Iran

Ramsar Wetland
- Official name: Lake Parishan and Dasht-e-Arjan
- Designated: 23 June 1975
- Reference no.: 37

Lake Parishan (Persian: دریاچه پریشان) is a lake in Iran. The Parishan Lake is in Jereh and Baladeh District in Fars province and is the largest freshwater lake in the country. It receives very small amount of water from feeder rivers and the whole lake or wetland is a protected area, as it is considered a globally significant wetland ecosystem. Another lake in this area is that of Arzhan. The whole protected area is called "Arzhan National Park." This area is an important sanctuary for birds.

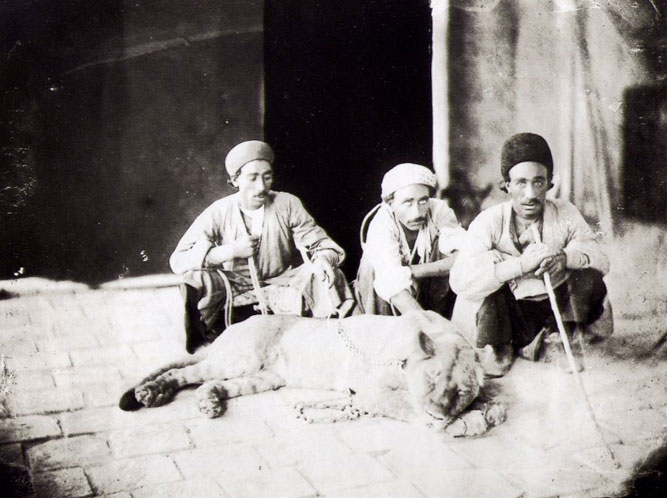
An old photograph of a lion in Iran by Antoin Sevruguin, c. 1880

== Geographical location ==
This lake is located between 51 degrees and 44 minutes and 51 degrees and 51 minutes of east longitude and 29 degrees and 32 minutes and 30 seconds of north latitude. Its area is 4300 hectares and its height is 820 meters above the open water level. Its catchment area is 266.5 square kilometers and its largest area is in April.

== Biodiversity ==
=== Flora ===
- In this lake, different types of coarse or fine algae and submerged algae containing green algae live, including the following: Phytoplankton, Spirogyra, Nitzschia, Lemanea, Gomphosphaeria, Gymnodinium.
- Submerged plants in Parishan Lake, which are completely submerged in water, include the following types: Najadaceae and Ceratophyllaceae families are plants that are completely submerged in water and only their flowers may appear on the surface or outside of the water surface.
- Different types of plants like the following live in this ecosystem: Phragmites, Typhaceae, Cyperaceae, Liliaceae.

=== Fauna ===
10 species of fish live in Parishan Lake, which are in the order of average abundance: Capoeta barroisi, Shishamo, Mesopotamian himri, Eurasian carp, Hypostomus plecostomus, Crucian carp, Anguillidae, Liza abu and Shabout.

== Registered in UNESCO ==
This lake has been registered as an international wetland in the Ramsar Convention and is considered a protected area in the division of regions.

== Drying up of the lake ==
The existence of 1,300 wells for unsustainable agriculture has been the main reason for the drying up of Parishan Lake.

== See also ==
- Kazerun
- Maharloo Lake
- Wildlife of Iran
