= Darian, Iran =

City in Fars province, Iran

Darian Persian: داريان
- City
- Location within Iran
- Coordinates: 29°33′45″N 52°55′43″E
- Country: Iran
- Province: Fars
- County: Shiraz
- District: Darian

Population (2016)
  - Total: 10,037
- Time zone: UTC+3:30 (IRST)

Darian (Persian: داريان) (Note: Also romanized as Dārīān; also known as Dārīūn and Dārlyān) is a city in, and the capital of, Darian District of Shiraz County, Fars province, Iran. It served as the administrative center for Darian Rural District until its capital was transferred to the village of Dowdej.

== Demographics ==
=== Population ===
At the time of the 2006 National Census, the city's population was 9,926 in 2,558 households, when it was in the Central District. The following census in 2011 counted 9,557 people in 2,769 households. The 2016 census measured the population of the city as 10,037 people in 3,021 households.

In 2024, the city and the rural district were separated from the district in the formation of Darian District.
