= Darian Rural District =

Rural district in Fars province, Iran

Darian Rural District Persian: دهستان داريان
- Rural District
- Location within Iran
- Coordinates: 29°34′27″N 52°50′04″E
- Country: Iran
- Province: Fars
- County: Shiraz
- District: Darian
- Capital: Dowdej

Population (2016)
  - Total: 7,636
- Time zone: UTC+3:30 (IRST)

Darian Rural District (Persian: دهستان داريان) is in Darian District of Shiraz County, Fars province, Iran. Its capital is the village of Dowdej. The rural district was previously administered from the city of Darian.

== Demographics ==
=== Population ===
At the time of the 2006 National Census, the rural district's population (as a part of the Central District) was 8,712 in 2,127 households. There were 8,622 inhabitants in 2,385 households at the following census of 2011. The 2016 census measured the population of the rural district as 7,636 in 2,355 households. The most populous of its 39 villages was Tarbor-e Jafari, with 1,795 people.

In 2024, the rural district was separated from the district in the formation of Darian District.
