= Kaftarak Rural District =

Rural district in Fars province, Iran

Kaftarak Rural District Persian: دهستان كفترك
- Rural District
- Location within Iran
- Coordinates: 29°31′20″N 52°47′20″E
- Country: Iran
- Province: Fars
- County: Shiraz
- District: Central
- Capital: Shiraz

Population (2016)
  - Total: 14,485
- Time zone: UTC+3:30 (IRST)

Kaftarak Rural District (Persian: دهستان كفترك) is in the Central District of Shiraz County, Fars province, Iran. It is administered from the city of Shiraz. The previous capital of the rural district was the village of Nasrabad.

== Demographics ==
=== Population ===
At the time of the 2006 National Census, the rural district's population was 32,436 in 8,287 households. There were 10,043 inhabitants in 2,815 households at the following census of 2011. The 2016 census measured the population of the rural district as 14,485 in 4,438 households. The most populous of its 18 villages was Mah-e Firuzan, with 3,203 people.
