= Derak Rural District =

Rural district in Fars province, Iran

Derak Rural District Persian: دهستان دراك
- Rural District
- Location within Iran
- Coordinates: 29°47′04″N 52°21′48″E
- Country: Iran
- Province: Fars
- County: Shiraz
- District: Central
- Capital: Shiraz

Population (2016)
  - Total: 11,451
- Time zone: UTC+3:30 (IRST)

Derak Rural District (Persian: دهستان دراك) is in the Central District of Shiraz County, Fars province, Iran. It is administered from the city of Shiraz. The previous capital of the rural district was the village of Sadeqiyeh.

== Demographics ==
=== Population ===
At the time of the 2006 National Census, the rural district's population was 126,191 in 32,025 households. There were 23,375 inhabitants in 6,414 households at the following census of 2011. The 2016 census measured the population of the rural district as 11,451 in 3,155 households. The most populous of its 29 villages was Qalat, with 3,953 people.
