= Qarah Chaman Rural District =

Rural district in Fars province, Iran

Qarah Chaman Rural District Persian: دهستان قره چمن
- Rural District
- Location within Iran
- Coordinates: 29°43′33″N 52°10′32″E
- Country: Iran
- Province: Fars
- County: Shiraz
- District: Arzhan
- Capital: Khaneh Zenyan

Population (2016)
  - Total: 7,854
- Time zone: UTC+3:30 (IRST)

Qarah Chaman Rural District (Persian: دهستان قره چمن) is in Arzhan District of Shiraz County, Fars province, Iran. It is administered from the city of Khaneh Zenyan.

== Demographics ==
=== Population ===
At the time of the 2006 National Census, the rural district's population was 9,231 in 2,034 households. There were 6,814 inhabitants in 1,824 households at the following census of 2011. The 2016 census measured the population of the rural district as 7,854 in 2,237 households. The most populous of its 75 villages was Kheyrabad, with 1,589 people.
