= Qarah Bagh Rural District =

Rural district in Fars province, Iran

Qarah Bagh Rural District Persian: دهستان قره باغ
- Rural District
- Location within Iran
- Coordinates: 29°31′00″N 52°33′49″E
- Country: Iran
- Province: Fars
- County: Shiraz
- District: Central
- Capital: Soltanabad

Population (2016)
  - Total: 54,630
- Time zone: UTC+3:30 (IRST)

Qarah Bagh Rural District (Persian: دهستان قره باغ) is in the Central District of Shiraz County, Fars province, Iran. Its capital is the village of Soltanabad.

== Demographics ==
=== Population ===
At the time of the 2006 National Census, the rural district's population was 31,337 in 7,553 households. There were 40,300 inhabitants in 10,493 households at the following census of 2011. The 2016 census measured the population of the rural district as 54,630 in 14,711 households. The most populous of its 84 villages was Shahpur Jan, with 10,280 people.
