= Kuh Mareh Sorkhi Rural District =

Rural district in Fars province, Iran

Kuh Mareh Sorkhi Rural District Persian: دهستان کوهمره سرخی
- Rural District
- Location within Iran
- Coordinates: 29°24′34″N 52°09′36″E
- Country: Iran
- Province: Fars
- County: Shiraz
- District: Arzhan
- Capital: Richi

Population (2016)
  - Total: 7,009
- Time zone: UTC+3:30 (IRST)

Kuh Mareh Sorkhi Rural District (Persian: دهستان کوهمره سرخی) is in Arzhan District of Shiraz County, Fars province, Iran. Its capital is the village of Richi.

== Demographics ==
=== Population ===
At the time of the 2006 National Census, the rural district's population was 9,034 in 1,883 households. There were 7,488 inhabitants in 1,968 households at the following census of 2011. The 2016 census measured the population of the rural district as 7,009 in 1,986 households. The most populous of its 49 villages was Romeghan, with 764 people.
