= Arzhan District =

District in Fars province, Iran

Arzhan District Persian: بخش ارژن
- District
- Location within Iran
- Coordinates: 29°32′50″N 52°05′26″E
- Country: Iran
- Province: Fars
- County: Shiraz
- Capital: Khaneh Zenyan

Population (2016)
  - Total: 23,461
- Time zone: UTC+3:30 (IRST)

Arzhan District (Persian: بخش ارژن) is in Shiraz County, Fars province, Iran. Its capital is the city of Khaneh Zenyan.

== History ==
After the 2006 National Census, the village of Khaneh Zenyan was elevated to the status of a city.

== Demographics ==
=== Population ===
At the time of the 2006 census, the district's population was 22,166 in 5,006 households. The following census in 2011 counted 22,554 people in 5,958 households. The 2016 census measured the population of the district as 23,461 inhabitants in 6,693 households.

=== Administrative divisions ===
Arzhan District Population
| Administrative Divisions | 2006 | 2011 | 2016 |
|---|---|---|---|
| Dasht-e Arzhan RD | 4,901 | 4,882 | 4,571 |
| Kuh Mareh Sorkhi RD | 9,034 | 7,488 | 7,009 |
| Qarah Chaman RD | 9,231 | 6,814 | 7,854 |
| Khaneh Zenyan (city) | | 3,370 | 4,027 |
| Total | 23,166 | 22,554 | 23,461 |
RD = Rural District

== Wildlife ==
There is an important ecological area here, that is Arzhan Protected Area.
