= Central District (Shiraz County) =

District in Fars province, Iran

Central District (Shiraz County) Persian: بخش مرکزی شهرستان شیراز
- District
- Location within Iran
- Coordinates: 29°38′54″N 52°35′02″E
- Country: Iran
- Province: Fars
- County: Shiraz
- Capital: Shiraz

Population (2016)
  - Total: 1,788,411
- Time zone: UTC+3:30 (IRST)

The Central District of Shiraz County (Persian: بخش مرکزی شهرستان شیراز) is in Fars province, Iran. Its capital is the city of Shiraz.

== History ==
In 2009, Sadra was upgraded to city status. After the 2016 National Census, Siyakh Darengun Rural District was separated from the district in the formation of Siyakh Darengun District.

In 2024, Darian Rural District and the city of Darian were separated from the district to form Darian District.

== Demographics ==
=== Population ===
At the time of the 2006 census, the district's population was 1,442,842 in 372,838 households. The following census in 2011 counted 1,625,807 people in 461,209 households. The 2016 census measured the population of the district as 1,788,411 inhabitants in 543,807 households.

=== Administrative divisions ===
Central District (Shiraz County) Population
Administrative Divisions	2006	2011	2016
Bid Zard RD	18,468	20,690	22,063
Darian RD (Note: Transferred to Darian District)	8,712	8,622	7,636
Derak RD	126,191	23,375	11,451
Kaftarak RD	32,436	10,043	14,485
Qarah Bagh RD	31,337	40,300	54,630
Siyakh Darengun RD (Note: Renamed Siyakh Rural District and became a part of Siyakh Darengun District after the 2016 census)	10,890	12,576	10,674
Darian (city)	9,926	9,557	10,037
Sadra (city)		39,979	91,863
Shiraz (city)	1,204,882	1,460,665	1,565,572
Total	1,442,842	1,625,807	1,788,411
RD = Rural District
