= Shiraz County =

County in Fars province, Iran

Shiraz County Persian: شهرستان شیراز
- County
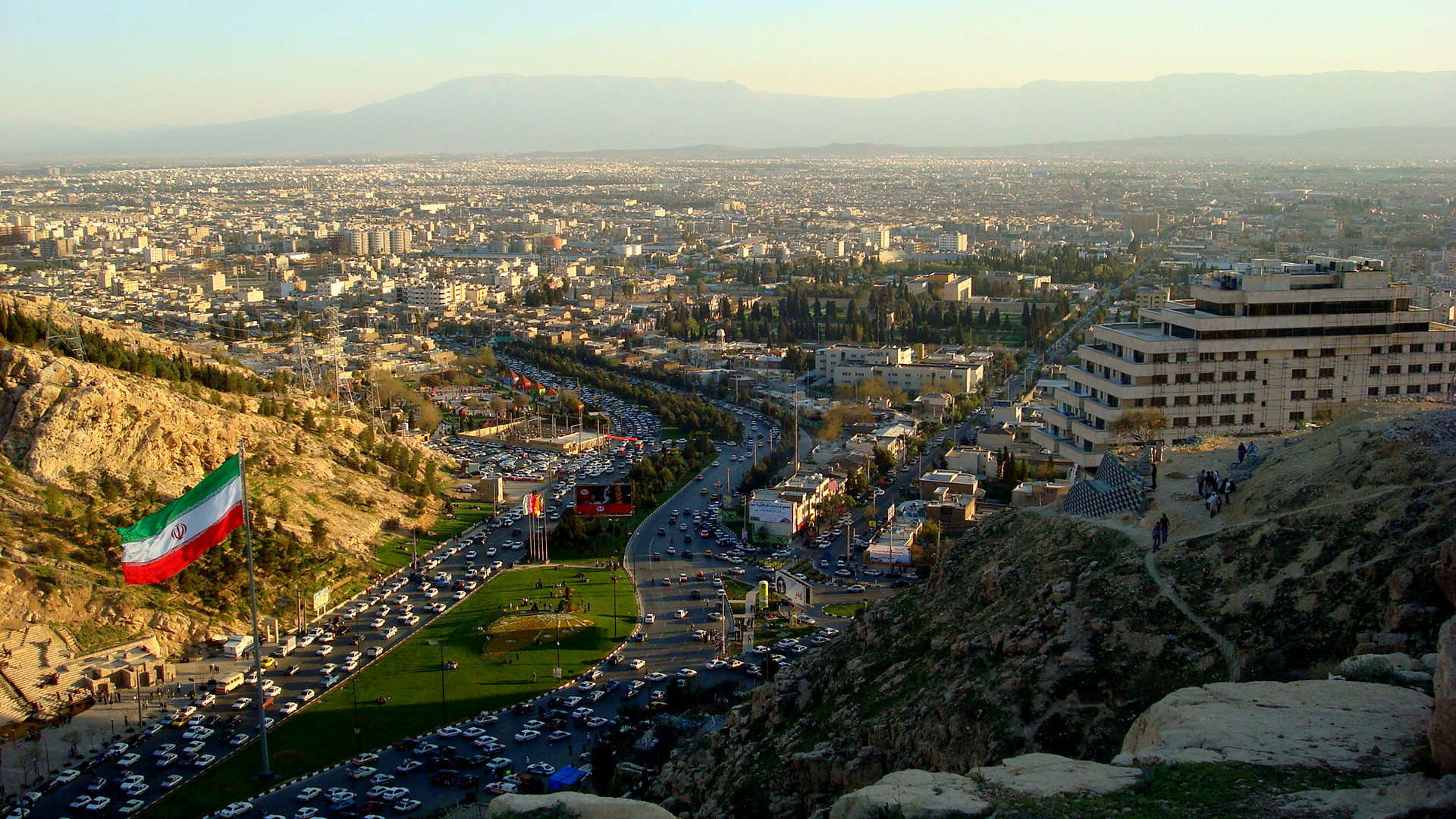
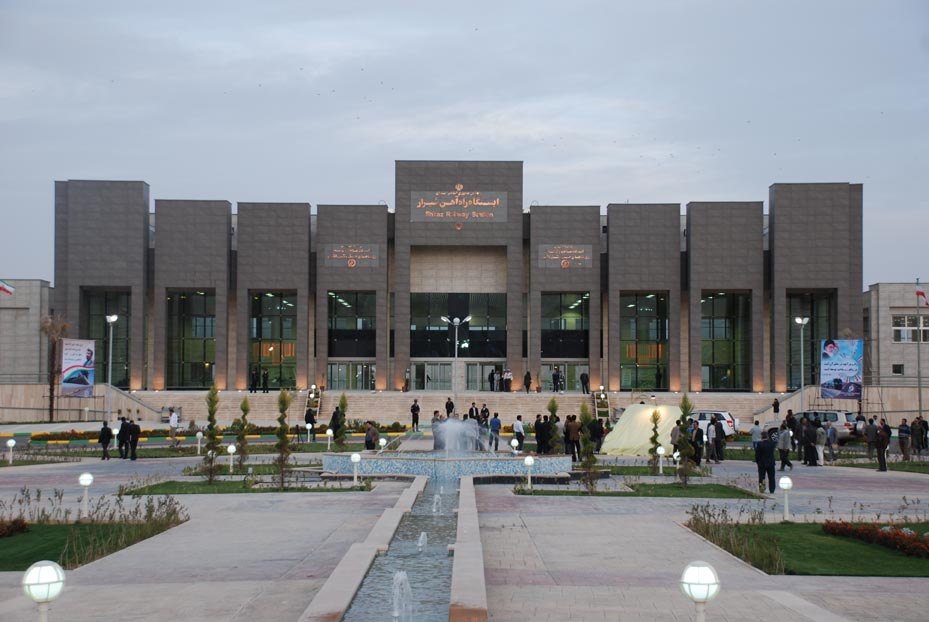
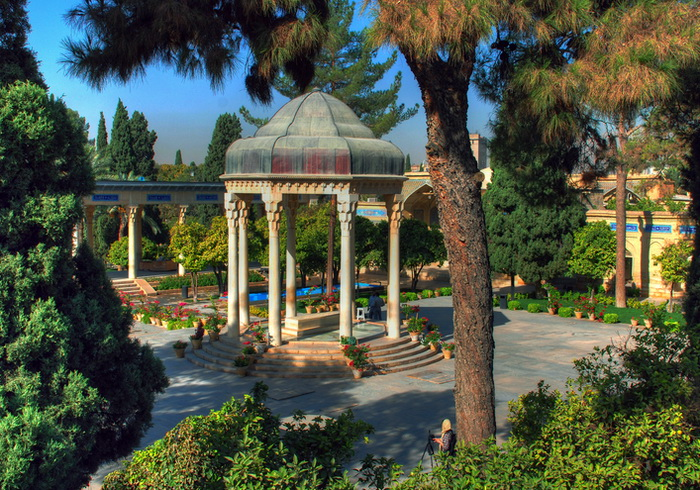
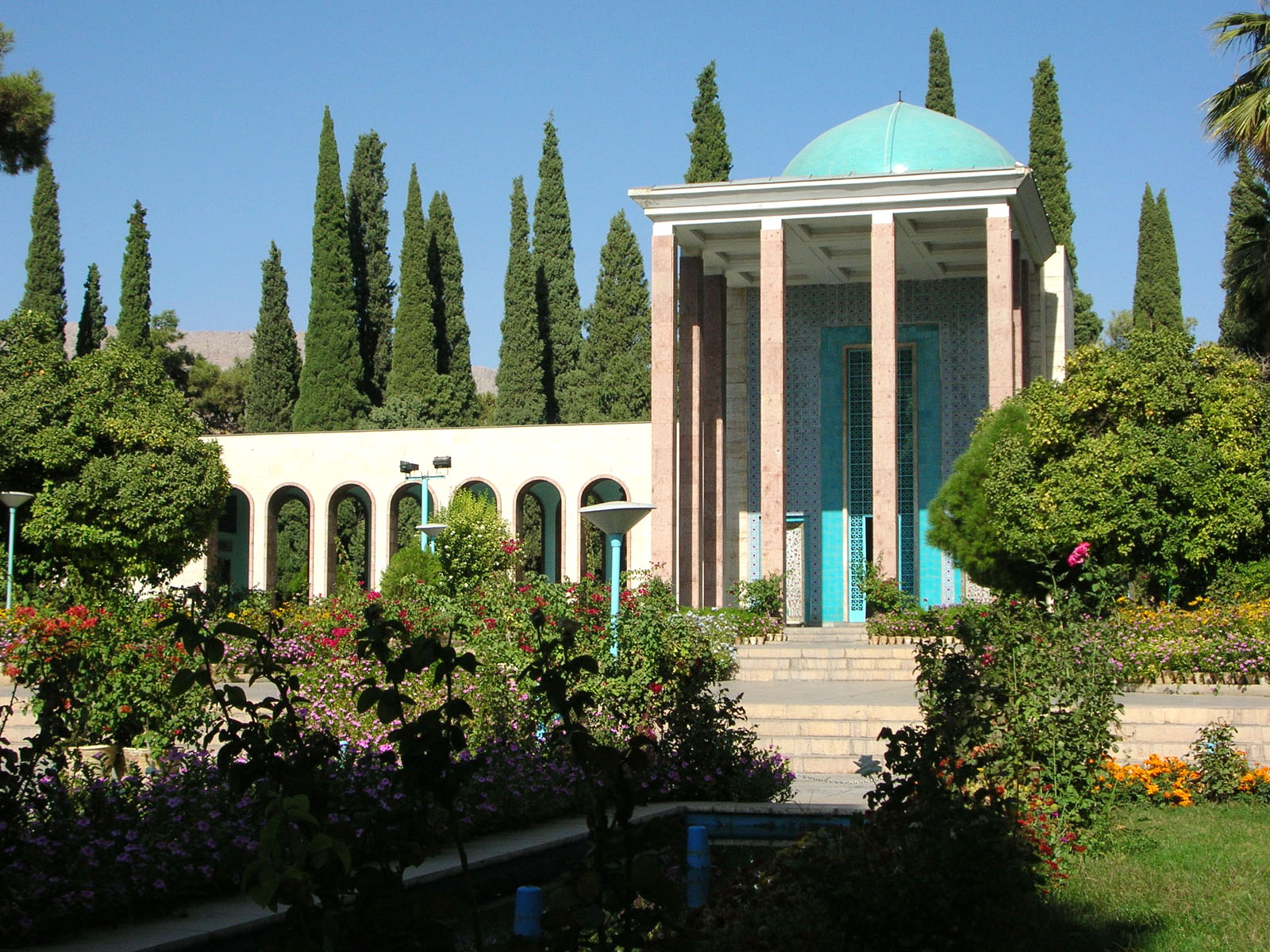
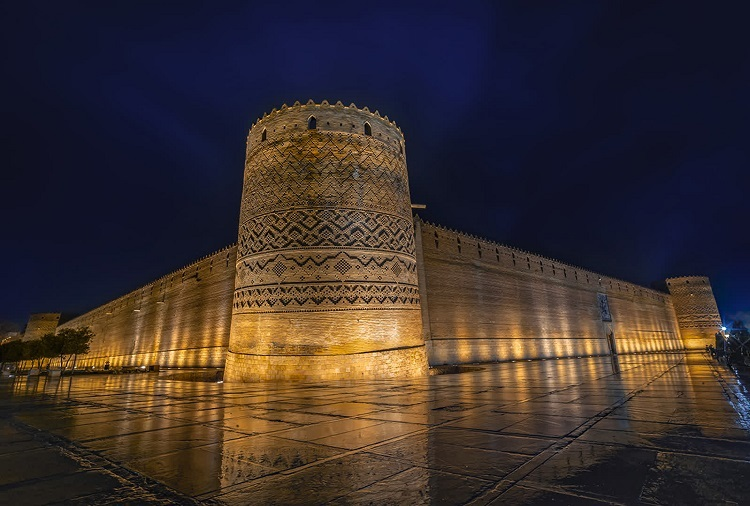
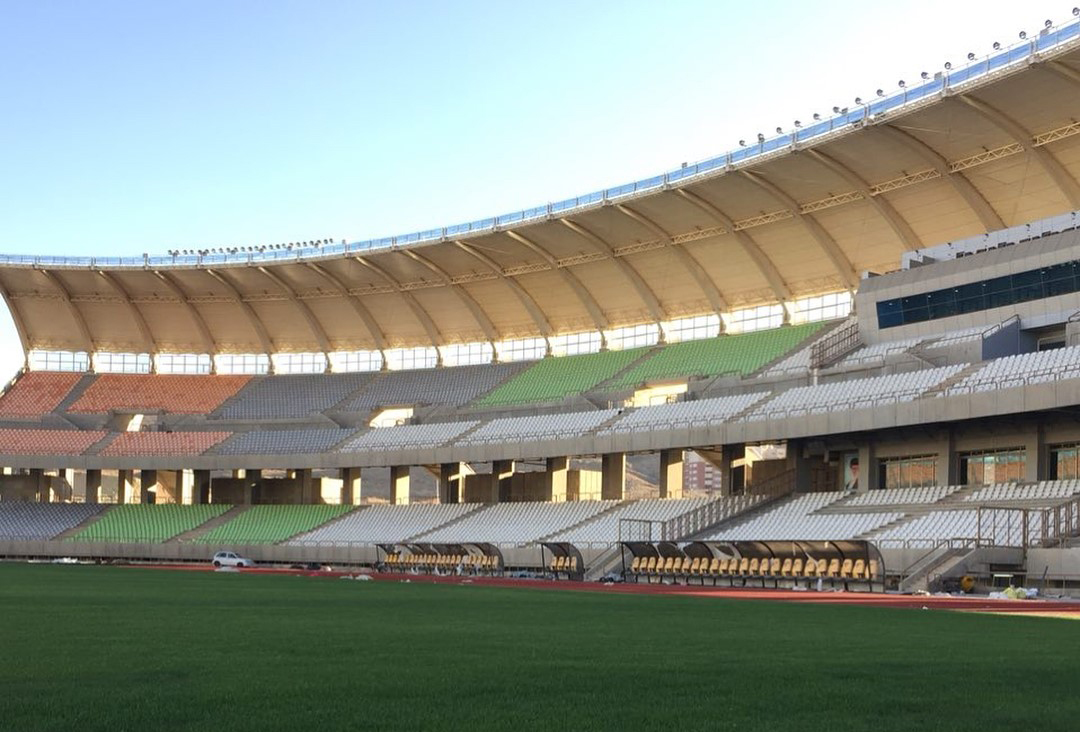

- Location of Shiraz County in Fars province (center left, yellow)

- Location of Fars province in Iran
- Coordinates: 29°36′N 52°25′E
- Country: Iran
- Province: Fars
- Capital: Shiraz
- Districts: Central, Arzhan, Darian, Siyakh Darengun

Population (2016)
  - Total: 1,869,001
- Time zone: UTC+3:30 (IRST)

Shiraz County (Persian: شهرستان شیراز) is in Fars province, Iran. Its capital is the city of Shiraz.

== History ==
After the 2006 National Census, Kavar District was separated from the county in the establishment of Kavar County; Korbal District to establish Kharameh County; and Sarvestan District in establishing Sarvestan County. The villages of Khaneh Zenyan and Sadra were elevated to city status.

After the 2016 census, Zarqan District was separated from the county in the establishment of Zarqan County. Additionally, Siyakh Darengun Rural District was separated from the Central District in the formation of Siyakh Darengun District, including the new Darengun Rural District.

In 2024, Darian Rural District and the city of Darian were separated from the Central District to form Darian District, including the new Tarbor Rural District.

== Demographics ==
=== Population ===
At the time of the 2006 census, the county's population was 1,676,927 in 427,268 households. The following census in 2011 counted 1,700,687 people in 481,239 households. The 2016 census measured the population of the county as 1,869,001 in 567,567 households.

=== Administrative divisions ===
Shiraz County's population history and administrative structure over three consecutive censuses are shown in the following table.

Shiraz County Population
Administrative Divisions	2006	2011	2016
Central District	1,442,842	1,625,807	1,788,411
Bid Zard RD	18,468	20,690	22,063
Darian RD	8,712	8,622	7,636
Derak RD	126,191	23,375	11,451
Kaftarak RD	32,436	10,043	14,485
Qarah Bagh RD	31,337	40,300	54,630
Siyakh Darengun RD (Note: Renamed Siyakh Rural District)	10,890	12,576	10,674
Darian (city)	9,926	9,557	10,037
Sadra (city)		39,979	91,863
Shiraz (city)	1,204,882	1,460,665	1,565,572
Arzhan District	23,166	22,554	23,461
Dasht-e Arzhan RD	4,901	4,882	4,571
Kuh Mareh Sorkhi RD	9,034	7,488	7,009
Qarah Chaman RD	9,231	6,814	7,854
Khaneh Zenyan (city)		3,370	4,027
Darian District (Note: Established after the 2016 census)			
Darian RD			
Tarbor RD			
Darian (city)			
Kavar District (Note: Transferred to Kavar County)	72,423		
Farmeshkan RD	6,300		
Kavar RD	23,118		
Tasuj RD	20,847		
Kavar (city)	22,158		
Korbal District (Note: Transferred to Kharameh County)	57,372		
Dehqanan RD	7,614		
Kheyrabad RD	5,841		
Korbal RD	15,616		
Sofla RD	6,618		
Kharameh (city)	21,683		
Sarvestan District (Note: Transferred to Sarvestan County)	34,452		
Kuhenjan RD	6,692		
Maharlu RD	4,032		
Sarvestan RD	6,882		
Sarvestan (city)	16,846		
Siyakh Darengun District (Note: Established after the 2016 census)			
Darengun RD			
Siyakh RD (Note: Formerly Siyakh Darengun Rural District)			
Zarqan District (Note: Transferred to Zarqan County after the 2016 census)	46,672	52,065	56,104
Band-e Amir Rural District	9,085	8,289	7,554
Rahmatabad RD	6,597	6,168	6,212
Zarqan RD	6,154	1,726	1,092
Lapui (city)	4,975	6,924	8,985
Zarqan (city)	19,861	28,958	32,261
Total	1,676,927	1,700,687	1,869,001
RD = Rural District

== See also ==
Media related to Shiraz County at Wikimedia Commons
