= Jayankondan Block =

Coordinates: 11.2121853°N 79.3458554°E

Jayankondan block is a revenue block of Ariyalur district of the Indian state of Tamil Nadu. This revenue block consist of 35 panchayat villages.

== List of Panchayat Villages ==
They are,

SI.No	Panchayat Village
1	A.Nayakanpettai
2	Alathippallam
3	Amanakkanthondi
4	Angarayanallur
5	Devamangalam
6	Edayar
7	Elayaperumalnallur
8	Eravangudy
9	Gangaikonda Cholapuram
10	Gundaveli
11	Guruvalapparkovil
12	Kallathur
13	Kalumangalam
14	Kaluvanthondi
15	Katchiperumal
16	Kattagaram
17	M.S.Madam
18	Melanikuzhi
19	Padanilai
20	Pappakudi
21	Periyavalayam
22	Pilichikuzhi
23	Pillapalayam
24	Pirancheri
25	Pitchanur
26	Saluppai
27	T.Cholankurichi
28	Thaluthalaimedu
29	Thandalai
30	Thathanur
31	Thularankurichi
32	Utkottai
33	V.T.Pattinam
34	Vangudi
35	Vethiyarvettu
