= Andimadam Block =

Coordinates: 11°20′7″N 79°22′33″E

Andimadam block is a revenue block of Ariyalur district of the Indian state of Tamil Nadu. This revenue block consists of 30 panchayat villages.

They are,

SI.No	Panchayat Village
1	Alagapuram
2	Andimadam
3	Anikudhichan
4	Ayyur
5	Devanur
6	Edayakurichi
7	Elaiyur
8	Karukkai
9	Kattathur
10	Kavarapalayam
11	Kodukkur
12	Kolathur
13	Koovathur
14	Kovilvalkai
15	Kuvagam
16	Marudhur
17	Melur
18	Nagampandhal
19	Olaiyur
20	Pe.krishnapuram
21	Periyathukurichi
22	Pudukudi
23	Rangiyam
24	Silambur
25	Sriraman
26	Thirukalappur
27	Vallam
28	Variankaval
29	Vilandhai
30	Viludhudaiyan
