= Ayur =

Ayur or Ayyur (Persian: ايور) may refer to:

- Ayur, Fars, Iran
- Bab Ayur, Fars Province, Iran
- Eivar, North Khorasan, Iran
- Ivar, Razavi Khorasan, Iran
- Ayoor, Kerala, India
- Ayyur, Ariyalur, Tamil Nadu, India
- Ayur Veda (lit. 'Veda/Knowledge of Life'), traditional Indian medicine

== See also ==
- Ayyur (Mythology)
