= Andimadam (disambiguation) =

Andimadam (Tamil: ஆண்டிமடம்), is a town in Tamil Nadu. It is one of the blocks in the Ariyalur district.

Andimadam may also refer to:

- Andimadam, a town in Tamil Nadu
- Andimadam (state assembly constituency), a legislative assembly constituency
- Andimadam Block, a revenue block of Ariyalur district
