= Khaneh Khamis =

Khaneh Khamis (Persian: خانه خميس), also rendered as Khankhamis, may refer to:

- Khaneh Khamis-e Olya
- Khaneh Khamis-e Sofla
