= Hoseynabad, Darengun =

Village in Fars province, Iran

Hoseynabad حسین‌آباد
- Village
- Location within Iran
- Coordinates: 29°22′39″N 52°22′14″E
- Country: Iran
- Province: Fars
- County: Shiraz
- District: Siyakh Darengun
- Rural District: Darengun

Population (2016)
  - Total: 1,621
- Time zone: UTC+3:30 (IRST)

Hoseynabad (Persian: حسین‌آباد) (Note: Formerly Shahrak-e Ghadir (شهرك غدير), also romanized as Shahrak-e Ghadīr) is a village in, and the capital of, Darengun Rural District of Siyakh Darengun District, Shiraz County, Fars province, Iran.

== Demographics ==
=== Population ===
At the time of the 2006 National Census, the village's population was 1,016 in 210 households, when it was in Siyakh Darengun Rural District (Note: Renamed Siyakh Rural District) of the Central District. The following census in 2011 counted 1,457 people in 370 households. The 2016 census measured the population of the village as 1,621 people in 440 households.

After the census, the rural district was separated from the district in the establishment of Siyakh Darengun District and renamed Siyakh Rural District. Hoseynabad was transferred to Darengun Rural District created in the new district.
