= Elaiyur =

Elaiyur is a large village located in the Udayarpalayam Taluk of Tamil Nadu, India. The village is named after the Eallaiyur temple, located at the border of Gangaikonda Cholapuram.

== Geography ==
Elaiyur Village is comprising seven regions: Elaiyur (West), Elaiyur (West), Elaiyur (South), Elaiyur (Southeast), Kandiyankollai, Koriyampatti, and Palla Kulam (Northeast).

Areas surrounding and within Elaiyur have been known to be sedimentary depositional environments. Field/outcrops prominence, such as bed geometry, sedimentary structure, texture, erosional surfaces, etc., indulge as confirmation for depositional environments.

Magnetic susceptibility in the areas within and surrounding Elaiyur is not uncommon. The magnetic fabric in the sedimentary rocks, surrounding Elaiyur, can develop during deposition (primary fabric) and even after deposition (secondary fabrics) of the sediments as a result of bioturbation, compaction and tectonic disturbances (Rees 1961). Magnetic samples of Kallankurichchi limestone have been deemed suitable for magnetic fabric studies due to its high magnetic susceptibility.

Elaiyur and surrounding areas are also known for rare, distinctive, shell microstructures. Optical microscopic observations and SEM studies of the shells, in this area, of six genera clearly indicate that all the four sub-families consist of distinctive set of shell-microstructures.

== Notable locations ==
There are several temples in this village. Selliyammen Koil is a temple located in Sendurai on Jayamkondam's Main Road. The Selliyammen Koil Festival is a festival in this district that takes place once a year at the end of May.

There are two Vijayanagar Temples in Elaiyur. One is located near Malangan Lake, and the other is located near Canara Bank.

Elaiyur Village contains three large lakes: the Malangan Lake, the South Veli Lake, and Palla Kulam Canara Bank are located in Elaiyur South.

== Population ==
As of 2011, Elaiyur had a population of 6,393 of which 3,052 are males while 3,341 are females, 3,402 were employed. 59.11% of workers describe their work as Main Work (Employment or Earning more than 6 Months) while 40.89% were involved in Marginal activity providing livelihood for less than 6 months. Of 3,402 workers engaged in Main Work, 743 were cultivators (owner or co-owner) while 661 were Agricultural labourers.

Elaiyur is made up of 1,738 families. The population age 0–6 is 650 which makes up 10.17% of total population of village. Average sex ratio of Elaiyur village is 1095 which is higher than Tamil Nadu state average of 996. Child sex ratio for the Elaiyur as per census is 862, lower than Tamil Nadu average of 943.

Elaiyur village has lower literacy rate compared to Tamil Nadu. In 2011, literacy rate of Elaiyur village was 67.65% compared to 80.09% of Tamil Nadu. In Elaiyur Male literacy stands at 79.91% while female literacy rate was 56.74%.

== Sources ==
Jaitly, A., Mishra, S., & Sen, S. (2014). Shell microstructure of late Cretaceous (Maastrichtian) oysters from Ariyalur, Tamil Nadu. Journal of the Geological Society of India, 84(1), 41–54.

Papanna, G., Venkateshwarlu, M., Periasamy, V., & Nagendra, R. (2014). Anisotropy of magnetic susceptibility (AMS) studies of Campanian-Maastrichtian sediments of Ariyalur Group, Cauvery Basin, Tamil Nadu, India: An appraisal to Paleocurrent directions. Journal of Earth System Science, 123(2), 351–364.

K, B. (2017). Geochemical characteristics of sandstones from Cretaceous Garudamangalam area of Ariyalur, Tamilnadu, India: Implications of provenance and tectonic setting. Journal of Earth System Science, 126(4), 1–13.

== See also ==
- Elaiyur (East)
- Elaiyur (West)
