= India Pride Project =

- Founded: 2014
- Founder: S. Vijay Kumar and Anuraag Saxena
- Type: Non-governmental organization
- Region served: India
- Website: ipp.org.in

India Pride Project (IPP) is a grassroots group of art enthusiasts who use open source intelligence to identify stolen religious artefacts from temples in India in order to facilitate their return. Co-founded in 2014 by two Singapore-based art enthusiasts, S. Vijay Kumar and Anuraag Saxena, it now has activist volunteers from all over the world.

== Recovery Efforts ==
Through the work of the IPP, a 12th-century bronze Buddha statue stolen from the ASI site museum in Nalanda, Bihar, India nearly 60 years ago was identified in circulation on the European market and was successfully returned to India via London’s Metropolitan Police during a handover ceremony which coincided with India’s Independence Day.

The group of volunteers have also contributed research crucial to other successful restitutions of objects of dubious provenance, such as a 12th-century Buddha stolen from a Bihar museum in 1961 and a 900-year-old Natarajan idol taken from the Brihadeeswara Temple in Sripuranthan, Tamil Nadu in 2006.

IPP also contributed research that ultimately resulted in eight statues (including a 12th century Chola bronze figure of the dancing child-saint Sambandar) and six paintings being arranged to be returned by the National Gallery of Australia to the Indian government.
