= Periyavalayam =

- village
- Country: India
- State: Tamil Nadu
- District: Ariyalur

Population (2001)
  - Total: 3,305

Languages
  - Official: Tamil
- Time zone: UTC+5:30 (IST)
- PIN: 621802
- Vehicle registration: TN-46
- Coastline: 0 kilometres (0 mi)
- Sex ratio: 1062/1703 ♂/♀
- Literacy: 65.30%

Periyavalayam is a village in the Udayarpalayam taluk of Ariyalur district, Tamil Nadu, India.

== Demographics ==
As per the 2001 census, Periyavalayam had a total population of 3305 with 1602 males and 1703 females.

== Places near Periyavalayam ==
Angarayanallur, Chinnavalayam, Jayankondam, Kaluvanthondi, Karadikulam, Kilakudiyiruppu, and Sengunthapuram post offices share the same Postal Index (PIN) Code: 621802. Gangaikonda cholapuram, the famous temple is just 10.00 km away from Periyavalayam.
