= Aliabad-e Khvoshablu =

Village in Fars province, Iran

Aliabad-e Khvoshablu Persian: علي ابادخوشابلو
- Village
- Country: Iran
- Province: Fars
- County: Shiraz
- District: Siyakh Darengun
- Rural District: Siyakh

Population (2016)
  - Total: 0
- Time zone: UTC+3:30 (IRST)

Aliabad-e Khvoshablu (Persian: علي ابادخوشابلو) (Note: Also romanized as 'Alīābād-e Khvoshāblū) is a village in Siyakh Rural District of Siyakh Darengun District in Shiraz County, Fars province, Iran.

== Demographics ==
=== Population ===
At the time of the 2006 National Census, the village's population was 21 in five households, when it was in Siyakh Darengun Rural District (Note: Renamed Siyakh Rural District) of the Central District. The village did not appear in the following census of 2011. The 2016 census measured the population of the village as zero.

After the census, the rural district was separated from the district in the formation of Siyakh Darengun District and renamed Siyakh Rural District.
