= Ganga Jadadisvarar Temple =

Temple in Tamil Nadu, India

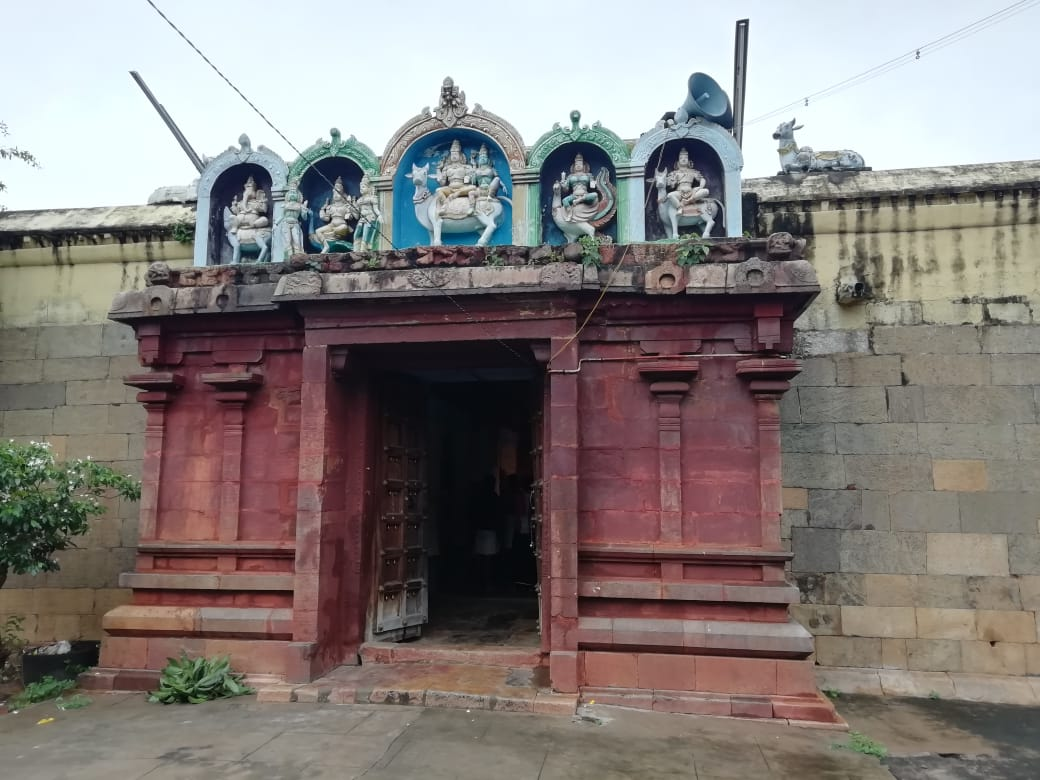

- Location in Tamil Nadu, India Ganga Jadadisvarar Temple (Tamil Nadu)

Religion
- Affiliation: Hinduism
- District: Ariyalur District
- Deity: Shiva

Location
- Location: Govindaputhur
- State: Tamil Nadu
- Country: India
- Interactive map of Ganga Jadadisvarar Temple
- Coordinates: 11.030499°N 79.297731°E

Architecture
- Type: Dravidian architecture
- Creator: Cholas
- Inscriptions: Tamil

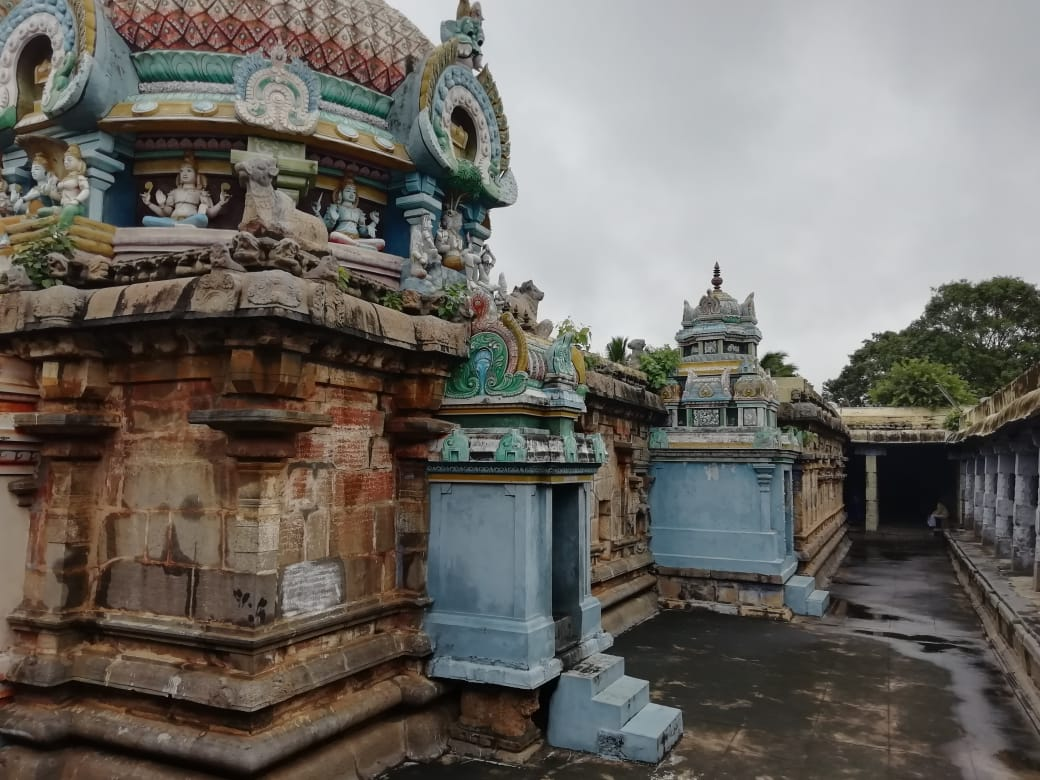

The Ganga Jadadisvarar Temple (also known as the Govindaputhur Gangajatatheeswarar Temple) is a Hindu temple located in the village of Govindaputtur, Ariyalur District, Tamil Nadu, India. Saint Appar and Sambandar who lived during the period of Mahendravarma Pallava praised the deity of the temple in their Devaram hymns. The present temple building was built by Uttama Chola by his officer Ambalavan Paluvur Nakkan in 980 AD.

== Vaippu Sthalam ==
It is one of the shrines of the Vaippu Sthalams.

== Location ==
The Ganga Jadadisvarar Temple is located in the village of Govindaputtur. The village is located in the Ariyalur District, Tamil Nadu in India and is located on the north bank of the Kollidam River.
