= Kattagaram =

Kattagaram may refer to any of the following villages in Ariyalur district, Tamil Nadu, India:

- Kattagaram (North)
- Kattagaram (South)
