= Shib Jadval =

Shib Jadval شيب جدول
- Village
- Location within Iran
- Coordinates: 29°26′05″N 52°22′08″E
- Country: Iran
- Province: Fars
- County: Shiraz
- Bakhsh: Central
- Rural District: Siyakh Darengun

Population (2006)
  - Total: 379
- Time zone: UTC+3:30 (IRST)
  - Summer (DST): UTC+4:30 (IRDT)

Shib Jadval (Persian: شيب جدول, also Romanized as Shīb Jadval; also known as Shīb Jūb) is a village in Siyakh Darengun Rural District, in the Central District of Shiraz County, Fars province, Iran. At the 2006 census, its population was 379, in 73 families.
