= Darengun Rural District =

Rural district in Fars province, Iran

Darengun Rural District Persian: دهستان دارنگون
- Rural District
- Location within Iran
- Coordinates: 29°20′25″N 52°20′19″E
- Country: Iran
- Province: Fars
- County: Shiraz
- District: Siyakh Darengun
- Capital: Hoseynabad
- Time zone: UTC+3:30 (IRST)

Darengun Rural District (Persian: دهستان دارنگون) is in Siyakh Darengun District of Shiraz County, Fars province, Iran. Its capital is the village of Hoseynabad, whose population at the time of the 2016 National Census was 1,621 in 440 households.

== History ==
After the 2016 census, Siyakh Darengun Rural District (Note: Renamed Siyakh Rural District) was separated from the Central District in the establishment of Siyakh Darengun District. Darengun Rural District was created in the new district.
