= Koovathur (North) =

- village
- Country: India
- State: Tamil Nadu
- District: Ariyalur

Population (2001)
  - Total: 2,491

Languages
  - Official: Tamil
- Time zone: UTC+5:30 (IST)
- Vehicle registration: TN-
- Coastline: 0 kilometres (0 mi)
- Sex ratio: 975 ♂/♀
- Literacy: 66.15%

Koovathur (North) is a village in the Udayarpalayam taluk of Ariyalur district, Tamil Nadu, India.

== Demographics ==
As per the 2001 census, Koovathur (Nouth) had a total population of 2491 with 1261 males and 1230 females.

== See also ==
- Koovathur (South)
