= Qaleh Chubi =

Qaleh Chubi قلعه چوبي
- Village
- Location within Iran
- Coordinates: 29°20′07″N 52°26′57″E
- Country: Iran
- Province: Fars
- County: Shiraz
- Bakhsh: Central
- Rural District: Siyakh Darengun

Population (2006)
  - Total: 837
- Time zone: UTC+3:30 (IRST)
  - Summer (DST): UTC+4:30 (IRDT)

Qaleh Chubi (Persian: قلعه چوبي, also Romanized as Qal‘eh Chūbī) is a village in Siyakh Darengun Rural District, in the Central District of Shiraz County, Fars province, Iran. At the 2006 census, its population was 837, in 199 families.
