= Kattathur =

Kattathur may refer to any of the following villages in Ariyalur district, Tamil Nadu, India:

- Kattathur (North)
- Kattathur (South)
