= Kundaveli (West) =

Kundaveli (West) Alathippallam
- village
- Country: India
- State: Tamil Nadu
- District: Ariyalur

Population (2001)
  - Total: 2,377

Languages
  - Official: Tamil
- Time zone: UTC+5:30 (IST)
- Vehicle registration: TN-
- Coastline: 0 kilometres (0 mi)
- Sex ratio: 1006 ♂/♀
- Literacy: 64.47%

Kundaveli (West) is a village in the Udayarpalayam taluk of Ariyalur district, Tamil Nadu, India.

== Demographics ==
As per the 2001 census, Kundaveli (West) had a total population of 2377 with 1185 males and 1192 females.
