= Venmankondan (West) =

- village
- Interactive map of Venmankondan (West)
- Coordinates: 11°06′11″N 79°14′24″E
- Country: India
- State: Tamil Nadu
- District: Ariyalur

Population (2001)
  - Total: 2,775

Languages
  - Official: Tamil
- Time zone: UTC+5:30 (IST)
- Vehicle registration: TN-
- Coastline: 0 kilometres (0 mi)
- Sex ratio: .940 ♂/♀
- Literacy: 53.32%

Venmankondan (West) is a village in the Udayarpalayam taluk of Ariyalur district, Tamil Nadu, India.

== Demographics ==
As per the 2001 census, Venmankondan (West) had a total population of 2775 with 1347 males and 1428 females.
