= Ayur, Fars =

Ayur ايور
- Village
- Location within Iran
- Coordinates: 29°26′57″N 52°23′16″E
- Country: Iran
- Province: Fars
- County: Shiraz
- Bakhsh: Central
- Rural District: Siyakh Darengun

Population (2006)
  - Total: 384
- Time zone: UTC+3:30 (IRST)
  - Summer (DST): UTC+4:30 (IRDT)

Ayur (Persian: ايور, also Romanized as Ayūr and Ayyūr) is a village in Siyakh Darengun Rural District, in the Central District of Shiraz County, Fars province, Iran. At the 2006 census, its population was 384, in 88 families.
