= Edayar, Ariyalur =

Edayar
- village
- Country: India
- State: Tamil Nadu
- District: Ariyalur

Population (2001)
  - Total: 2,899

Languages
  - Official: Tamil
- Time zone: UTC+5:30 (IST)
- Vehicle registration: TN-
- Coastline: 0 kilometres (0 mi)
- Sex ratio: 1024 ♂/♀
- Literacy: 59.05%

Edayar is a village in the Udayarpalayam taluk of Ariyalur district, Tamil Nadu, India.

== Demographics ==
As of 2001 census, Edayar had a total population of 2,899 with 1,432 males and 1,467 females.
