= Koovathur (South) =

- village
- Country: India
- State: Tamil Nadu
- District: Ariyalur

Population (2001)
  - Total: 3,909

Languages
  - Official: Tamil
- Time zone: UTC+5:30 (IST)
- Vehicle registration: TN-
- Coastline: 0 kilometres (0 mi)
- Sex ratio: 1008 ♂/♀
- Literacy: 65.26%

Koovathur (South) is a village in the Andimadam taluk of Ariyalur district, Tamil Nadu, India.

== Demographics ==
As per the 2001 census, Koovathur (South) had a total population of 3909 with 1947 males and 1962 females.

== See also ==
- Koovathur (North)
