= Kodangudi (North) =

- village
- Country: India
- State: Tamil Nadu
- District: Ariyalur

Population (2001)
  - Total: 1,345

Languages
  - Official: Tamil
- Time zone: UTC+5:30 (IST)
- Vehicle registration: TN-
- Coastline: 0 kilometres (0 mi)
- Sex ratio: 961 ♂/♀
- Literacy: 67.65%

Kodangudi (North) is a village in the Udayarpalayam taluk of Ariyalur district, Tamil Nadu, India.

== Demographics ==
As per the 2001 census, Kodangudi (North) had a total population of 1345 with 686 males and 659 females. Every one in that village belongs to vanniyar community.
