= Khaneh Khamis-e Olya =

Khaneh Khamis-e Olya خانه خميس عليا
- Village
- Location within Iran
- Coordinates: 29°33′15″N 52°18′09″E
- Country: Iran
- Province: Fars
- County: Shiraz
- Bakhsh: Central
- Rural District: Siyakh Darengun

Population (2006)
  - Total: 583
- Time zone: UTC+3:30 (IRST)
  - Summer (DST): UTC+4:30 (IRDT)

Khaneh Khamis-e Olya (Persian: خانه خميس عليا, also Romanized as Khāneh Khamīs-e 'Olyā; also known as Khānkhamīs-e 'Olyā) is a village in Siyakh Darengun Rural District, in the Central District of Shiraz County, Fars province, Iran. At the 2006 census, its population was 583, in 128 families.
