= Pilichikuzhi =

- village
- Location in Tamil Nadu, India Pilichikuzhi (India)
- Coordinates: 11°08′16.34″N 79°19′36.62″E
- Country: India
- State: Tamil Nadu
- District: Ariyalur

Population (2001)
  - Total: 2,067

Languages
  - Official: Tamil
- Time zone: UTC+5:30 (IST)
- Vehicle registration: TN-
- Coastline: 0 kilometres (0 mi)
- Sex ratio: 1.021 ♂/♀
- Literacy: 62.60%

Pilichikuzhi is a village in the Udayarpalayam taluk of Ariyalur district in the southern Indian state of Tamil Nadu. Administratively it falls under the Jayankondan revenue block and the Chidambaram parliamentary constituency. The official language in the area is Tamil.

== History ==
Pilichikuzhi is a traditional rural village in Tamil Nadu. Its development has been linked to agriculture and local governance. The village has been part of regional administrative systems under various rulers, the colonial administration, and post-independence India. There are no widely documented historical events or ancient sites specifically associated with Pilichikuzhi.

== Demographics ==
As per the 2001 census, Pilichikuzhi had a total population of 2067 with 1044 males and 1023 females.
