= Bab Ayur =

Village in Fars province, Iran

Bab Ayur Persian: باب ايور
- Village
- Location within Iran
- Coordinates: 29°26′01″N 52°23′27″E
- Country: Iran
- Province: Fars
- County: Shiraz
- District: Siyakh Darengun
- Rural District: Siyakh

Population (2016)
  - Total: 341
- Time zone: UTC+3:30 (IRST)

Bab Ayur (Persian: باب ايور) (Note: Also romanized as Bāb Ayūr; also known as ‘Ayūr, Bāba Aiyūr, Bābā Alīvar, Bābā Ayūr, Bābā Ayyūr, and Bovāyūr) is a village in, and the capital of, Siyakh Rural District (Note: Formerly Siyakh Darengun Rural District) of Siyakh Darengun District, Shiraz County, Fars province, Iran. The previous capital of the rural district was the village of Kedenj.

== Demographics ==
=== Population ===
At the time of the 2006 National Census, the village's population was 371 in 85 households, when it was in Siyakh Darengun Rural District (Note: Renamed Siyakh Rural District) of the Central District. The following census in 2011 counted 429 people in 120 households. The 2016 census measured the population of the village as 341 people in 111 households.

After the census, the rural district was separated from the district in the establishment of Siyakh Darengun District and renamed Siyakh Rural District.
