= Kedenj =

Village in Fars province, Iran

Kedenj Persian: کدنج
- Village
- Location within Iran
- Coordinates: 29°25′20″N 52°24′22″E
- Country: Iran
- Province: Fars
- County: Shiraz
- District: Siyakh Darengun
- Rural District: Siyakh

Population (2016)
  - Total: 2,116
- Time zone: UTC+3:30 (IRST)

Kedenj (Persian: کدنج) (Note: Also known as Kādīn and Kading) is a village in, and the former capital of, Siyakh Rural District (Note: Formerly Siyakh Darengun Rural District) of Siyakh Darengun District, Shiraz County, Fars province, Iran, serving as capital of the district. The capital of the rural district has been transferred to the village of Bab Ayur.

== Demographics ==
=== Population ===
At the time of the 2006 National Census, the village's population was 1,941 in 460 households, when it was in Siyakh Darengun Rural District (Note: Renamed Siyakh Rural District) of the Central District. The following census in 2011 counted 2,081 people in 569 households. The 2016 census measured the population of the village as 2,116 people in 607 households. It was the most populous village in its rural district.

After the census, the rural district was separated from the district in the formation of Siyakh Darengun District and renamed Siyakh Rural District.
