= Ulkottai (North) =

- village
- Country: India
- State: Tamil Nadu
- District: Ariyalur

Population (2001)
  - Total: 5,285

Languages
  - Official: Tamil
- Time zone: UTC+5:30 (IST)
- PIN: 612901
- Vehicle registration: TN-46
- Coastline: 0 kilometres (0 mi)
- Nearest city: Trichirapalli
- Sex ratio: 964 ♂/♀
- Literacy: 65.91%
- Lok Sabha constituency: Chidambaram

Ulkottai (North) is a village in the Udayarpalayam taluk of Ariyalur district, Tamil Nadu, India.

== Demographics ==
As per the 2001 census, Ulkottai (North) had a total population of 5285 with 2691 males and 2594 females.
