= Irugaiyur =

Coordinates: 11°05′N 79°20′E

- village
- Interactive map of Irugaiyur
- Country: India
- State: Tamil Nadu
- District: Ariyalur
- Established: 2007/11

Population (2001)
  - Total: 3,368

Languages
  - Tamil Official: Tamil
- Time zone: UTC+5:30 (IST)
- Postal code: 612904
- Vehicle registration: TN-61
- Coastline: 110 kilometres (68 mi)
- Sex ratio: 1057 ♂/♀
- Literacy: 55.46%
- Website: www.ariyalur.gov.in

Irugaiyur is a village in the Udayarpalayam taluk of Ariyalur district, Tamil Nadu, India. The village is governed by a panchayat, under authority of the T. Palur. There are four villages: Irugaiyur, Venanullur, Kottiyal, and Kuzhadukuppam. Kottiyal is located on the main road between Kumpakonam and Ariyalur; travel between Kottiyal and Kumpakonam is said to take 45 minutes.

== Demographics ==
As per the 2001 census, Irugaiyur had a total population of 3368 with 1637 males and 1731 females.
