= Suthamalli =

- village
- Country: India
- State: Tamil Nadu
- District: Ariyalur

Population (2001)
  - Total: 3,922

Languages
  - Official: Tamil
- Time zone: UTC+5:30 (IST)
- Vehicle registration: TN-
- Coastline: 0 kilometres (0 mi)
- Sex ratio: 1020 ♂/♀
- Literacy: 55.61%

Suthamalli is a village in the Udayarpalayam taluk of Ariyalur district, Tamil Nadu, India.

== Demographics ==
As per the 2001 census, Suthamalli had a total population of 3922 with 1932 males and 1990 females.

== Temples ==
Historical Sundaresvarar Temple and Varadaraja Perumal Temple are located here.

=== Idol theft ===
The Chola-era bronzes belonging to both the temples were stolen sometime before 2008. The Idol Wing of the Tamil Nadu Criminal Investigation Department (IW-CID) has traced some of them to the United States.

- Varadaraja Perumal Temple

S.No.	Deity	Stolen Idol traced to	Country	Current status	More Details
1	Vishnu			Recovered	
2	Sridevi			Recovered	
3	Bhudevi			Recovered	
4	Chakratalvar			Recovered	
5				Unknown	

- Sundaresvarar Temple

S.No.	Deity	As named in Idol Wing report	Stolen Idol traced to	Country	Current status	More Details
1	Nataraja	Natarajan	ICE	United States	Unknown	
2	Uma Parameshvari	Sivagami Amman / Thani Amman	ICE	United States	Unknown	
3	Parvati	Parvathy / Thani Amman	Private collector	Belgium	Unknown	
4	Parvati	Sivagami Amman	ICE	United States	Recovered	
5	Trishul	Deepalakshmi / Asthiradevar	ICE	United States	Unknown	
6	Somaskanda	Somaskandar			Unknown	
7	Kartikeya	Murugar / Subramaniyar	ICE	United States	Unknown	
8	Valli	Valli			Unknown	
9	Chandikeshwara	N/A	ICE	United States	Unknown	
