= Thathanur (East) =

- village
- Country: India
- State: Tamil Nadu
- District: Ariyalur

Population (2001)
  - Total: 4,029

Languages
  - Official: Tamil
- Time zone: UTC+5:30 (IST)
- Vehicle registration: TN-
- Sex ratio: 1.04 ♂/ 1 ♀
- Literacy: 58.39%

Thathanur (East) is a village in the Udayarpalayam taluk of Ariyalur district, Tamil Nadu, India.

== Demographics ==
As per the 2001 census, Thathanur (East) had a total population of 4029 with 2144 males and 2065 females.
