= Rangiyam =

- village
- Location in Tamil Nadu, India Rangiyam (India)
- Coordinates: 11°20′56.90″N 79°22′28.97″E
- Country: India
- State: Tamil Nadu
- District: Ariyalur

Population (2001)
  - Total: 1,727

Languages
  - Official: Tamil
- Time zone: UTC+5:30 (IST)
- Vehicle registration: TN-
- Coastline: 0 kilometres (0 mi)
- Sex ratio: 0.958 ♂/♀
- Literacy: 64.89%

Rangiyam is a village in the Udayarpalayam taluk of Ariyalur district, Tamil Nadu, India.

== Demographics ==
As per the 2001 census, Rangiyam had a total population of 1727 with 845 males and 882 females.
