= Guruvalapparkovil =

- village
- Country: India
- State: Tamil Nadu
- District: Ariyalur

Population (2001)
  - Total: 6,098

Languages
  - Official: Tamil
- Time zone: UTC+5:30 (IST)
- Vehicle registration: TN-
- Coastline: 0 kilometres (0 mi)
- Sex ratio: 981 ♂/♀
- Literacy: 56.12%

Guruvalapparkovil is a village in the Udayarpalayam taluk of Ariyalur district, Tamil Nadu, India.

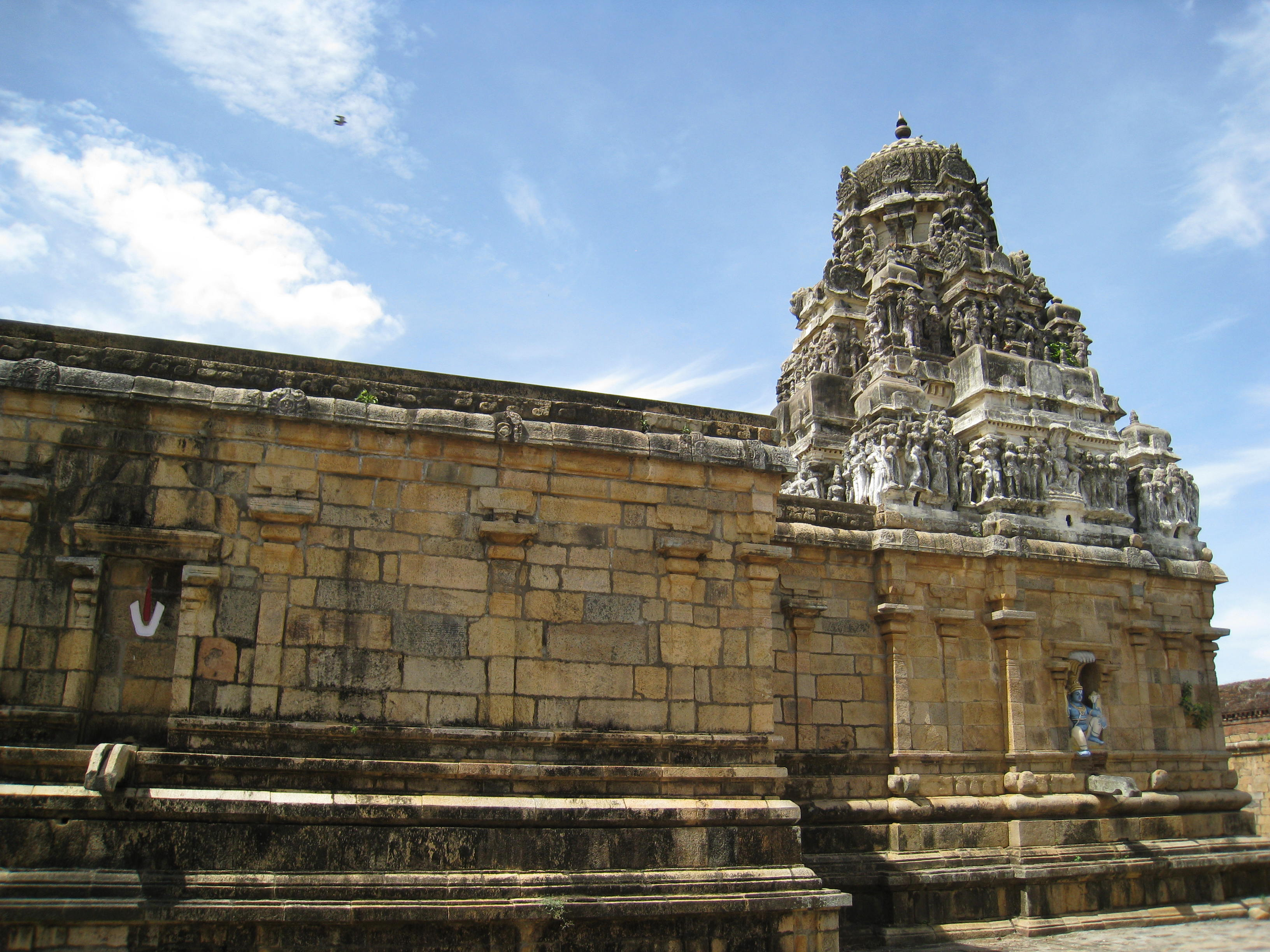
Viranarayana Perumal Temple, Guruvalapparkovil

== Demographics ==
As per the 2001 census, Guruvalapparkovil had a total population of 6098 with 3078 males and 3020 females.
