= Khaneh Khamis-e Sofla =

Khaneh Khamis-e Sofla خانه خميس سفلي
- Village
- Location within Iran
- Coordinates: 29°31′34″N 52°18′16″E
- Country: Iran
- Province: Fars
- County: Shiraz
- Bakhsh: Central
- Rural District: Siyakh Darengun

Population (2006)
  - Total: 713
- Time zone: UTC+3:30 (IRST)
  - Summer (DST): UTC+4:30 (IRDT)

Khaneh Khamis-e Sofla (Persian: خانه خميس سفلي, also Romanized as Khāneh Khamīs-e Soflá; also known as Khānkhamīs-e Soflá) is a village in Siyakh Darengun Rural District, in the Central District of Shiraz County, Fars province, Iran. At the 2006 census, its population was 713, in 144 families.
