= Sripurandan (North) =

- village
- Country: India
- State: Tamil Nadu
- District: Ariyalur

Population (2001)
  - Total: 3,029

Languages
  - Official: Tamil
- Time zone: UTC+5:30 (IST)
- Sex ratio: 989 ♂/♀
- Literacy: 56.51%

Sripurandan (North) is a village in the Udayarpalayam taluk of Ariyalur district, Tamil Nadu, India.

== Demographics ==
As per the 2001 census, Sripurandan (North) had a total population of 3029 with 1523 males and 1506 females.

== Temple ==
The village has a dilapidated Brihadeeswarar temple from 9th-century Chola period.

In 2008, theft of 8 idols from the temple was discovered by Government of India officials. One of these idols, the Sripuranthan Natarajan Idol found its way to the National Gallery of Australia. Some of the stolen statues were consequently returned and are now displayed in the Government Museum at Kumbakonam.

S.No.	Deity	As named in Idol Wing report	Stolen Idol traced to	Country	Current status	Remarks
1	Nataraja	Natarajar	National Gallery of Australia	Australia	Recovered	See: Sripuranthan Natarajan Idol
2	Uma Parameshwari	Sivagami Amman	Asian Civilisations Museum	Singapore	Recovered	
3	Ganesha	Vinayagar	Toledo Museum of Art	United States	Recovered	
4	Devi	Amman			Recovered	
5		Thani Amman	ICE	United States	Unknown	Incorrect labeling by IW
6	Shiva	Chandrashekar	James H. Clark	United States	Unknown (Seized by US authorities)	
7	Manikkavacakar	Sampanthar	Private collector	United States	Unknown (Seized by US authorities)	Incorrect labeling by IW
8	Sambandar	Narthana Krishnar			Unknown	Incorrect labeling by IW
