= Kuvagam =

- village
- Location in Tamil Nadu, India Kuvagam (India)
- Coordinates: 11.282605°N 79.285219°E
- Country: India
- State: Tamil Nadu
- District: Ariyalur

Population (2001)
  - Total: 5,492

Languages
  - Official: Tamil
- Time zone: UTC+5:30 (IST)
- PIN: 621710
- Vehicle registration: TN-
- Coastline: 0 kilometres (0 mi)
- Nearest city: Jayamkondam
- Sex ratio: 1010 ♂/♀
- Literacy: 58.76%
- Lok Sabha constituency: Chidambaram

Kuvagam is a village in the Udayarpalayam taluk of Ariyalur district, Tamil Nadu, India.

== Demographics ==
As of 2001 census, Kuvagam had a total population of 5492 with 2733 males and 2759 females.
