= Devamangalam =

- village
- Location in Tamil Nadu, India Devamangalam (India)
- Coordinates: 11°9′54″N 79°23′36″E
- Country: India
- State: Tamil Nadu
- District: Ariyalur

Population (2001)
  - Total: 3,137

Languages
  - Official: Tamil
- Time zone: UTC+5:30 (IST)
- PIN: 612 902
- Vehicle registration: TN-61
- Coastline: 0 kilometres (0 mi)
- Nearest city: Jayankondam
- Sex ratio: 988 ♂/♀
- Literacy: 63.25%
- Lok Sabha constituency: Chidambaram

Devamangalam is a village in the Udayarpalayam taluk of Ariyalur district, Tamil Nadu, India.

This place surrounded by many small ponds which stores rain water and gives water to the village and to the underground, all depends on the rain. Many crops grows in this village each year, which mostly contains the groundnut.

== Demographics ==
As per the 2001 census, Devamangalam had a total population of 3137 with 1578 males and 1559 females.
