= Thandalai =

- village
- Country: India
- State: Tamil Nadu
- District: Ariyalur

Population (2001)
  - Total: 5,310

Languages
  - Official: Tamil
- Time zone: UTC+5:30 (IST)
- PIN: 621803
- Telephone code: 04331
- Vehicle registration: TN-
- Coastline: 0 kilometres (0 mi)
- Nearest city: Trichy
- Sex ratio: 1.054 ♂/♀
- Literacy: 62.07%

Thandalai is a village in the Udayarpalayam taluk of Ariyalur district, Tamil Nadu, India. Government higher secondary school is located in Thandalai village.

== Demographics ==
As per the 2001 census, Thandalai had a total population of 5310 with 2729 males and 2581 females.
