= Vanathirayanpattinam =

Coordinates: 11°10′55.0″N 79°17′36.4″E

Vanathirayanpattinam Vanathirayampattinam
- village
- Interactive map of Vanathirayanpattinam
- Country: India
- State: Tamil Nadu
- District: Ariyalur

Population (2011)
  - Total: 4,687

Languages
  - Official: Tamil
- Time zone: UTC+5:30 (IST)
- Vehicle registration: TN-
- Coastline: 0 kilometres (0 mi)
- Sex ratio: 0.974 ♂/♀
- Literacy: 60.58%

Vanathirayanpattinam or Vanathirayampattinam is a village in the Udayarpalayam taluk of Ariyalur district, Tamil Nadu, India.

== Demographics ==
In the 2011 census, Vanathirayanpattinam had a total population of 4,687 of which 2,331 were males and 2,356 were females. The literacy rate was 67.05 percent (male 77.36 percent and female 57.00 percent), which was lower than the 80.09 percent literacy of Tamil Nadu.
