= Amanakkanthondi =

- village
- Location in Tamil Nadu, India Amanakkanthondi (India)
- Coordinates: 11°11′38″N 79°23′48″E
- Country: India
- State: Tamil Nadu
- District: Ariyalur

Population (2001)
  - Total: 1,111

Languages
  - Official: Tamil
- Time zone: UTC+5:30 (IST)
- Vehicle registration: TN-
- Coastline: 0 kilometres (0 mi)
- Sex ratio: 1081 ♂/♀
- Literacy: 51.61%

Amanakkanthondi is a village in the Udayarpalayam taluk of Ariyalur district, Tamil Nadu, India.

== Demographics ==
As per the 2001 census, Amanakkanthondi had a total population of 1111 with 534 males and 577 females.

== See also ==
- List of villages in Ariyalur district
