= Sripuranthan Natarajan Idol =

10th-century bronze statue of Nataraja

Sripuranthan Natarajar
- Year: 10th Century CE
- Type: Chola Bronze
- Medium: Bronze
- Subject: Natarajar, the Dancing Shiva
- Dimensions: 130 cm (51 in)
- Location: Stolen from the Brihadeeswarar Temple, Sripuranthan Village, Tamil Nadu
- Owner: Archaeological Survey of India, Government of India

The Sripuranthan Natarajan Idol, is a 900-year-old statue of Natarajan — the dancing Shiva — that was stolen from the ancient Brihadeeswarar temple of Sripuranthan, smuggled to the United States, and then sold to the National Gallery of Australia, Canberra with a false provenance, for US$5.1 million. The statue was consequently returned by Australia to the Indian government on ethical grounds, once questions were raised on due diligence not being followed during the acquisition.

== Nataraja ==
Nataraja (Tamil: "நடராசர்" or Kooththan "கூத்தன்; The Lord (or King) of Dance) is a depiction of the Hindu God Shiva as the cosmic dancer who performs his divine dance to destroy a weary universe and make preparations for the god Brahma to start the process of creation. The dance of Shiva in Tillai, the traditional name for Chidambaram, forms the motif for all the depictions of Shiva as Nataraja. He is also known as "Sabesan" which splits as "Sabayil aadum eesan" in Tamil which means "The Lord who dances on the dais". The form is present in most Shiva temples in South India and is the prime deity in the famous Thillai Nataraja Temple at Chidambaram. The sculpture is usually made in bronze, with Shiva dancing in an aureole of flames, lifting his left leg (in rare cases, the right leg) and balancing over a demon or dwarf (Muyalaka) who symbolizes ignorance. It is a well-known sculptural symbol in India and popularly used as a symbol of Indian culture.

== Background ==
The Udayarpalayam taluk of the Ariyalur District, in Tamil Nadu, India has nearly 463 ancient temples, of which 200 belong to the Chola period dated 9th to 10th century AD. Most of these temples haven't seen maintenance for many decades and have lax security. Local thieves used to target the idols for their metal content, usually melting them. Some idols are pure gold, silver and panchaloha. However, the entry of international smuggling cartels has changed the situation. With antique Chola art being worth millions in the international market, idol thieves were recruited to lift them from the temples. In 2008, one such gang allegedly recruited by New York-based art dealer Subhash Kapoor was responsible for stealing eight idols from the Brihadeeswarar temple at Sripuranthan, 18 idols from the Varadharaja Perumal temple, and in 2010, 6 panchaloha idols from Chozeeshwarar temple at Vikiramangalam.

== Subhash Kapoor ==
Subhash Kapoor owned an upscale Indian art dealership called 'Art of the Past' in Manhattan, USA. Across the years he had built a good working relationship with international art galleries as a reputable dealer of Indian antiques. Following accusations of illegal dealing, Kapoor's gallery was raided by Homeland Security and stolen artwork worth $100 million was seized. Subhash Kapoor was arrested in Germany and extradited to India to face trial. As of 2016, he is lodged at the Puzhal Central Prison in Tamil Nadu, India, facing charges for criminal conspiracy to steal antique idols, which carries a maximum sentence of 14 years. Kapoor protests his innocence and believes that he has been framed.

== Idol theft from Sripuranthan ==
According to the art investigative website, Chasing Aphrodite, Kapoor traveled to India and met Sanjivi Asokan, a kingpin of a ring of idol thieves. In 2006, thieves were hired for US$12,000 to steal eight idols — Nataraja and Uma Mashewari, Vinayagar, Devi, Deepalaksmi, Chandrashekarar, Sampanthar and Krishnar — from the dilapidated Brihadeeswarar temple at Sripuranthan. Worship at the temple had ended a long time before, as it was plagued by scorpions and poisonous bugs, and it was locked and had fallen into ruins. The theft occurred on three occasions starting in January 2006, with the thieves carefully gluing back the lock, using a lorry (truck) parked on the dry river bed behind the temple as the getaway vehicle. Soon after the theft, pictures of the stolen idols were sent to Kapoor in October 2006. The idols were mixed with new replicas to fool customs officials and exported out of India to New York by a company called Ever Star International Services Inc. where they were received by Nimbus Imports Exports, a company owned by Kapoor. Soon afterwards Kapoor obtained a certificate from the Art Loss Register (ALR) stating that the Nataraja idol was not on the stolen artifacts register.

At this point, the ALR had no information on the stolen Nataraja, as the theft of the idols was discovered by the villagers only in 2008. The discovery was made when officials of the Archaeological Survey of India, Government of India arrived in the village to remove the idols from the temple for safekeeping and the glued lock and missing idols were discovered. A First Information Report (FIR 133/2008) was filed at the Vikramangalam Police Station in this regard. The Economic Offenses Wing of the Tamil Nadu Police released pictures of the missing idols on its website.

== Acquisition by the National Gallery of Australia ==
The National Gallery of Australia (NGA) was keen to enhance its collection of Indian art. In 2008, the NGA, under Ron Radford, director and Robyn Maxwell, senior curator Asian art, acquired the dancing Shiva from Subhash Kapoor. The provenance provided stated that the idol was sold by Raj Mehgoub of Grand Central Parkway to Subhash Kapoor. Further, it was claimed the idol was acquired in New Delhi in 1970 (a year before the Indian government banned the export of antiquities from India), by Raj's late husband Abdullah Mehgoub, who was a Sudanese diplomat serving in India between 1968 and 1971. A sales receipt dated 15 April 1970, issued by Uttam Singh & Sons, Jama Masjid, Delhi, to Abdulla Mehgoub of Defence Colony, New Delhi was produced as part of the provenance. US$5.1 million was paid by the National Gallery of Australia for the idol.

== Theft exposed ==
The investigative website Chasing Aphrodite was the first to expose that the Shiva idol acquired by the NGA was a stolen artwork from Southern India. The story was picked up by Australian and Indian news agencies and widely reported. New York Police recovered pictures of the idol from Kapoor's house, where it appeared in a contemporary Indian house environment, discounting the claim that the idol has been outside India since 1971. Records of the idol had been maintained at the French Institute of Pondicherry, with three photo records from different periods. Further, a 75-year-old farmer, Govindarajan, had a 30-year-old picture of Natarajan and his consort, which was taken by a photographer from Kumbakonam. Using this information, The Hindu ran an investigative piece comparing photos — a photo of the Sripuranthan Natarajar idol from the French Institute of Pondicherry taken in 1994, photos of the idol recovered by New York Police during the raid of Kapoor's house, and the photo of the idol displayed at the National Gallery of Australia. It concluded all the photos were of the same idol, showing seven similarities

- 27 flames around the circle
- Left leg pointing between the 3rd and 4th flame
- Waist cloth of shiva merged with the 23rd and 24th flame
- 3rd flame slightly damaged
- 12th and 13th flame damaged
- 17th flame damaged
- Flowing hair damaged

However, the National Gallery of Australia, continued to deny that the artwork was stolen, refused to return it, and continued to display it in the gallery, without any note of its doubtful provenance. This stand was criticised by the Australian media, with Duncan Chappell, criminology expert from University of Sydney, calling it inappropriate and an international embarrassment. The Government of India formally requested the artwork to be returned, under the UNESCO convention on stolen antiquities.

Investigative site Poetry in Stone published a list of stories named as the 'Kapoor Files', showing that several of the stolen idols stolen from Sripuranthan and Suthamalli had appeared in consecutive 'Art of the Past' catalogues. The site compared the photos published in the Kapoor catalogs with the photos of the stolen idols as recorded by the French Institute of Pondicherry and pointed out the similarities.

== Return to India ==
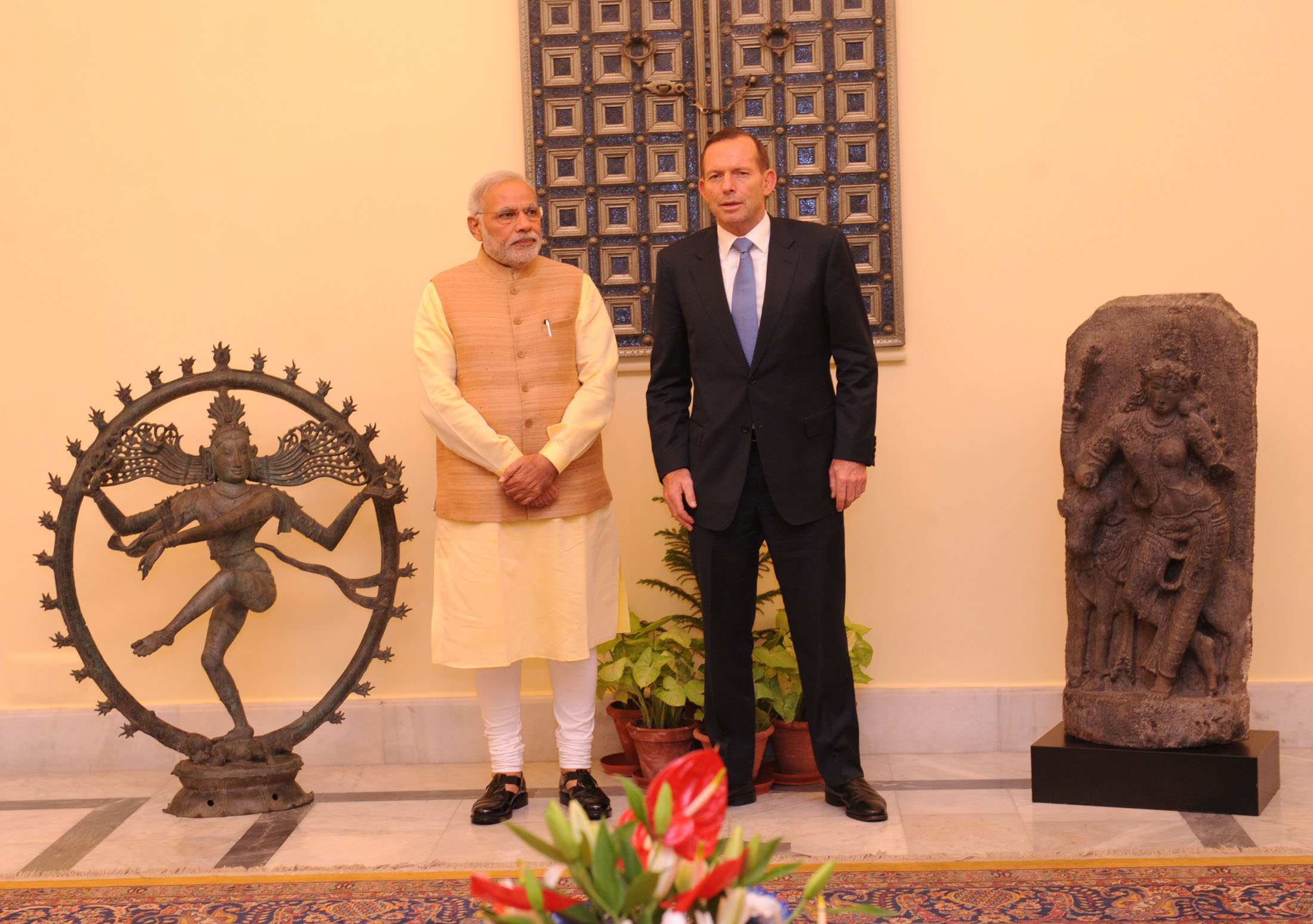
Modi and Abbott during handover

In March 2014, Ron Radford, the director of the National Gallery of Australia, removed the idol from display. In September 2014, the Australian government returned the Natarajan idol to India, along with another stolen antique idol of Shiva as Ardhanarishvarar which was displayed at the Art Gallery of New South Wales. The two were handed over by the then Australian Prime Minister Tony Abbott to the Indian Prime Minister Narendra Modi on 5 September 2014, at New Delhi.

The Nataraja idol was then moved to Chennai and stored in the safe room of the Archaeological Survey of India office at Fort St. George, before being produced before the judicial magistrates of Jayankondam and Vridhachalam.

In November 2014, the Nataraja idol was paraded on the streets of Sripuranthan, under tight security. It was temporarily placed in its original damp stone altar. However, officials made it clear that the statue would be displayed at the government museum at Kumbakonam and will be brought into Sripuranthan for annual festivities. The consort of Nataraja was traced to the Asian Civilisation Museum at Singapore, and the Government of Singapore agreed for its return to India.

Overall four of the eight statues stolen from Sripuranthan were traced, with three to the United States and one to Singapore.

In March 2016, the Natarajan idol was re-united with its consort Uma Parmeshwari, at the ASI Icon Centre, Kumbakonam, after nearly 8 years. The Singapore Civilisation Museum had finally returned the Uma Parmeshwari after long negotiations with the Indian Government.

== Consequences ==
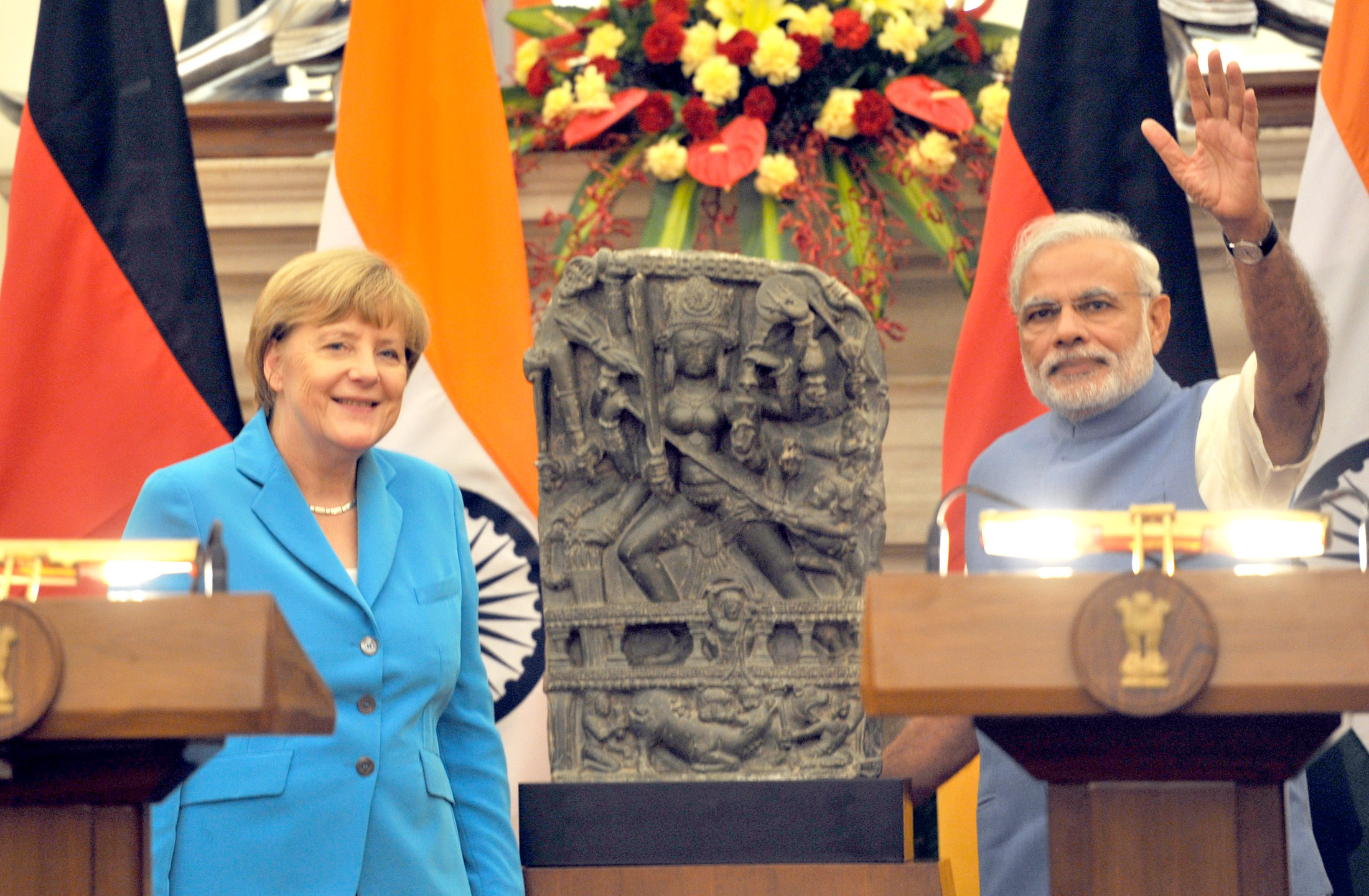
Modi and Merkel during handover of Mahishasuramardini

Subhash Kapoor's arrest alarmed museums all over the world, as they started investigating their purchases from his gallery. The Linden Museum in Germany returned to the Indian government a 9th-century AD idol of Mahishasuramardini, stolen from Pulwama district in Jammu and Kashmir in the 1990s, which had been acquired from Kapoor. The Toledo Museum of Art in Ohio returned four artifacts acquired from Kapoor, including the Vinayagar statue stolen from Sripuranthan. The other antiques are a stone idol of Varaha Rescuing the Earth (acquired 2001), Mughal origin 18th-century enamel with gold box (acquired 2008), and a watercolour Rasikapriya from the Samdehi Ragini (acquired 2010).

In November 2015, the United States returned a chola period bronze of Shivan and Parvathi, which was sold to the David Owsley Museum of Art at the Ball State University in 2005 by Subhash Kapoor. Here also, the sculpture was sold with a false provenance which placed it back to an American collection of Leo Figie, dated to 1969. The idol was recovered by the US Immigration and Customs Enforcement’s (ICE) Homeland Security Investigations (HSI).

In June 2016, the United States returned nearly 200 antiques to the Indian Government, in the presence of the visiting Prime Minister of India, Narendra Modi at Washington DC. Among the antiques returned were the Chola period (850 AD to 1250 AD) bronze of the Tamil Shaivite poet Manikkavacakar stolen from the Sivan Temple in Madras and the 1000 year old Sripuranthan Vinayagar which was displayed at the Toledo Museum of Art.
