= Pappakudi (North) =

- village
- Nickname: Pappakudi
- Country: India
- State: Tamil Nadu
- District: Ariyalur

Area
  - Total: 18.00 km^{2} (6.95 sq mi)

Population (2001)
  - Total: 3,467
  - Density: 192.6/km^{2} (498.9/sq mi)

Languages
  - Official: Tamil
- Time zone: UTC+5:30 (IST)
- Postal code: 612 903
- Vehicle registration: TN-
- Coastline: 0 kilometres (0 mi)
- Sex ratio: 1013 ♂/♀
- Literacy: 71.81%

Pappakudi (North) is a village in the Udayarpalayam taluk of Ariyalur district, Tamil Nadu, India.

== Demographics ==
As per the 2001 census, Pappakudi (North) had a total population of 3467 with 1722 males and 1745 females.
