= Vethiyarvettu =

Vethiyarvettu vettiyar vettu
- village
- Country: India
- State: Tamil Nadu
- District: Ariyalur

Population (2001)
  - Total: 3,187

Languages
  - Official: Tamil
- Time zone: UTC+5:30 (IST)
- PIN: 621803
- Vehicle registration: TN-
- Coastline: 0 kilometres (0 mi)
- Nearest city: jayankondam
- Sex ratio: 999 ♂/♀
- Literacy: 65.06%
- Lok Sabha constituency: Chidambaram

Vethiyarvettu is a village in the Udayarpalayam taluk of Ariyalur district, Tamil Nadu, India.

== Demographics ==
As per the 2001 census, Vethiyarvettu had a total population of 3187 with 1594 males and 1593 females.

Lake

- Cholangan Lake
- Ambalavanan lake

Temples

- Mariyamman kovil (west)
- Mariyamman kovil (east)
- Periyanayagi kovil
- Muneeswaran kovil
- Sangali Karppu kovil
- Veeranar kovil

Vanniyar kula khathriyar, Scheduled Castes and Scheduled Tribes the population respectively.
