= Vangudi =

Coordinates: 11°17′N 79°28′E

- village
- Interactive map of Vangudi
- Country: India
- State: Tamil Nadu
- District: Ariyalur

Population (2001)
  - Total: 4,795

Languages
  - Official: Tamil
- Time zone: UTC+5:30 (IST)
- PIN: 612903
- Telephone code: 04331
- Vehicle registration: TN-45
- Coastline: 40 kilometres (25 mi)
- Nearest city: Jayankondam
- Sex ratio: 1.018 ♂/♀
- Literacy: 63.03%
- Lok Sabha constituency: Chidambaram

Vangudi is a village in the Udayarpalayam taluk of Ariyalur district, Tamil Nadu, India. It is located 235 km away from Chennai.

== Demographics ==
As per the 2001 census, Vangudi had a total population of 4795 with 2419 males and 2376 females.
