= Muthuservamadam =

- village
- Country: India
- State: Tamil Nadu
- District: Ariyalur

Population (2001)
  - Total: 4,528

Languages
  - Official: Tamil
- Time zone: UTC+5:30 (IST)
- PIN: 612903
- Vehicle registration: TN-
- Coastline: 0 kilometres (0 mi)
- Sex ratio: 1022 ♂/♀
- Literacy: 60.36%

Muthuservamadam is a village in the Udayarpalayam taluk of Ariyalur district, Tamil Nadu, India.

== Demographics ==
As per the 2001 census, Muthuservamadam had a total population of 4528 with 2239 males and 2289 females.
