= Sengunthapuram =

Sengunthapuram is a small village in Jayankondam (Jayamkonda Chozhapuram), Tamil Nadu, India, with a group of around 3000 Sengunthar families staying together. Its PIN Code is 621802.

Sengunthapuram was formed during the 1914s as a rehabilitation measure by the government for people of the nearby places Marudur, Variyankaval and Elaiyur when they were hit by frequent floods during those periods.

The 110years celebrating next year 2026. The big celebrating happened continuously. The statue formed by village people for former founder of sengunthapuram

the founder of the village is " chellakutty sengunthar "

this village peoples main job is weaving .

this village is under the jayankondam municipality
