= Govindaputhur =

- village
- Country: India
- State: Tamil Nadu
- District: Ariyalur

Population (2001)
  - Total: 4,396

Languages
  - Official: Tamil, Urdu
- Time zone: UTC+5:30 (IST)
- Vehicle registration: TN-61
- Coastline: 0 kilometres (0 mi)
- Sex ratio: 997 ♂/♀
- Literacy: 59.91%

Govindaputhur is a village in the Udayarpalayam Taluk of Ariyalur district, Tamil Nadu, India.

== Demographics ==
As per the 2001 census, Govindaputhur had a total population of 4396 with 2201 males and 2195 females.
