= Jayankondam =

- Town
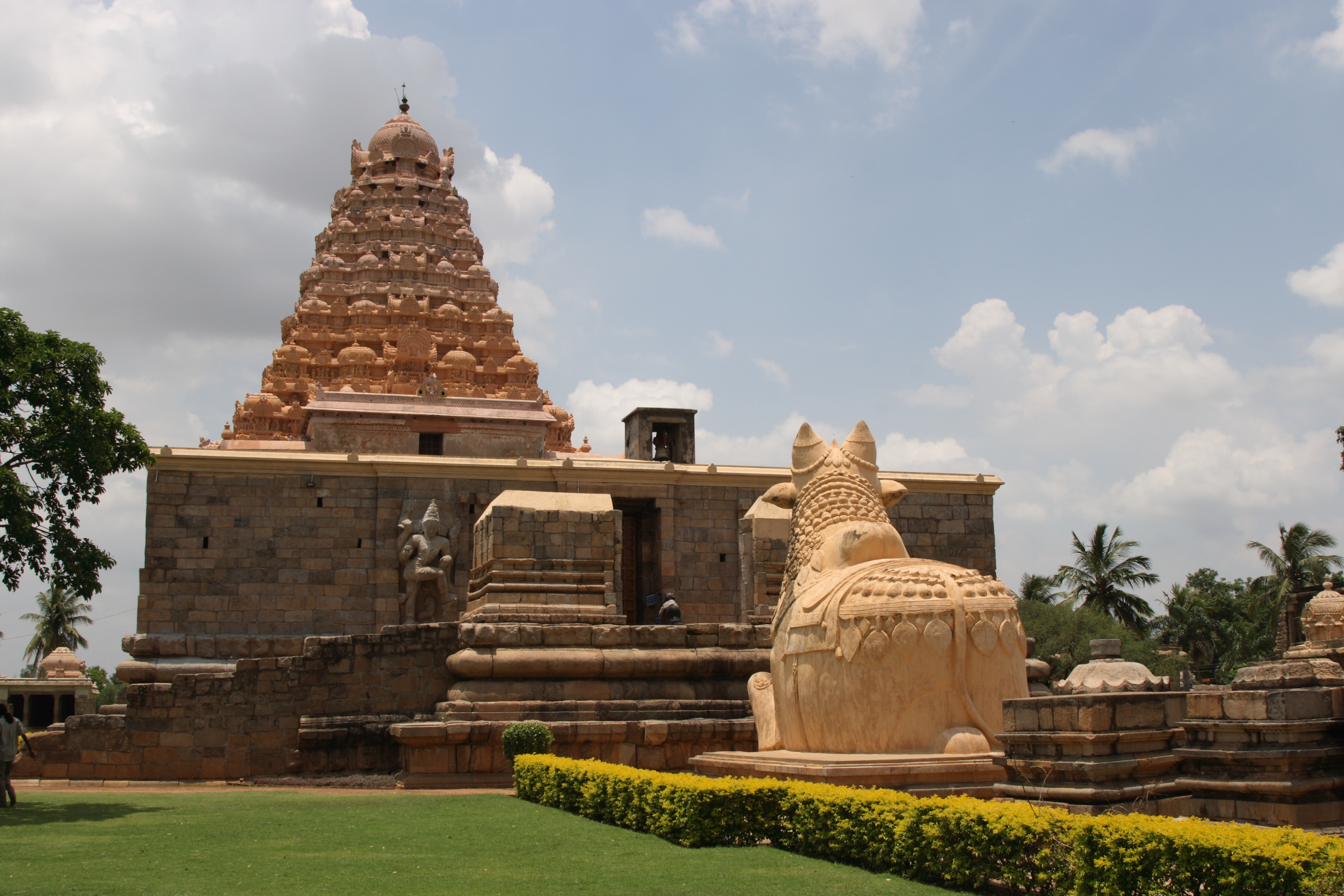
- Nickname: Cashew City
- Location in Tamil Nadu, India
- Coordinates: 11.212°N 79.365°E
- Country: India
- State: Tamil Nadu
- District: Ariyalur

Government
  - Type: Municipality
  - Body: Jayankondan Municipality

Population (2023)
  - Total: 46,000

Languages
  - Official: Tamil
- Time zone: UTC+5:30 (IST)
- PIN: 621802
- Telephone code: 04331
- Vehicle registration: TN 61
- Website: https://jayankondam.in

Jayankondam is a town in Ariyalur district of Tamil Nadu in India. As of 2023, the town had a population of 46,000 people. Jayankondam has more than 25 temples of various historical periods in the vicinity. The existing Government Higher Secondary School at Jayankondam has nearly 2000 students enrolled.

== Location ==
Jayankondam is well-connected by roadways. The national highway NH81 passes through Jayankondam, connecting it to Chidambaram and Tiruchirapalli. The state highway SH140, which connects Virudachalam with Kumbakonam, passes through this town. Chennai is located 247 km away. Kumbakonam is to the south, about 29 km from Jayankondam via the Neelathanallur-Mathanathur bridge. Ariyalur is 38 km to the west. Viruthachalam is 36 km to the north and Chidambaram is 50 km to the east. Jayankondam town limit extends over an area of 28 km^{2}.

Huge amounts of lignite deposits have been found in Jayankondam, and power projects have been initiated by the Neyveli Lignite Corporation.

The PIN (Postal Index) Code for Jayankondam is 621802, shared by the following nearby post offices: Angarayanallur, Chinnavalayam, Kaluvanthondi, Karadikulam, Kilakudiyiruppu, Periyavalayam, and Sengunthapuram.

=== Transportation ===
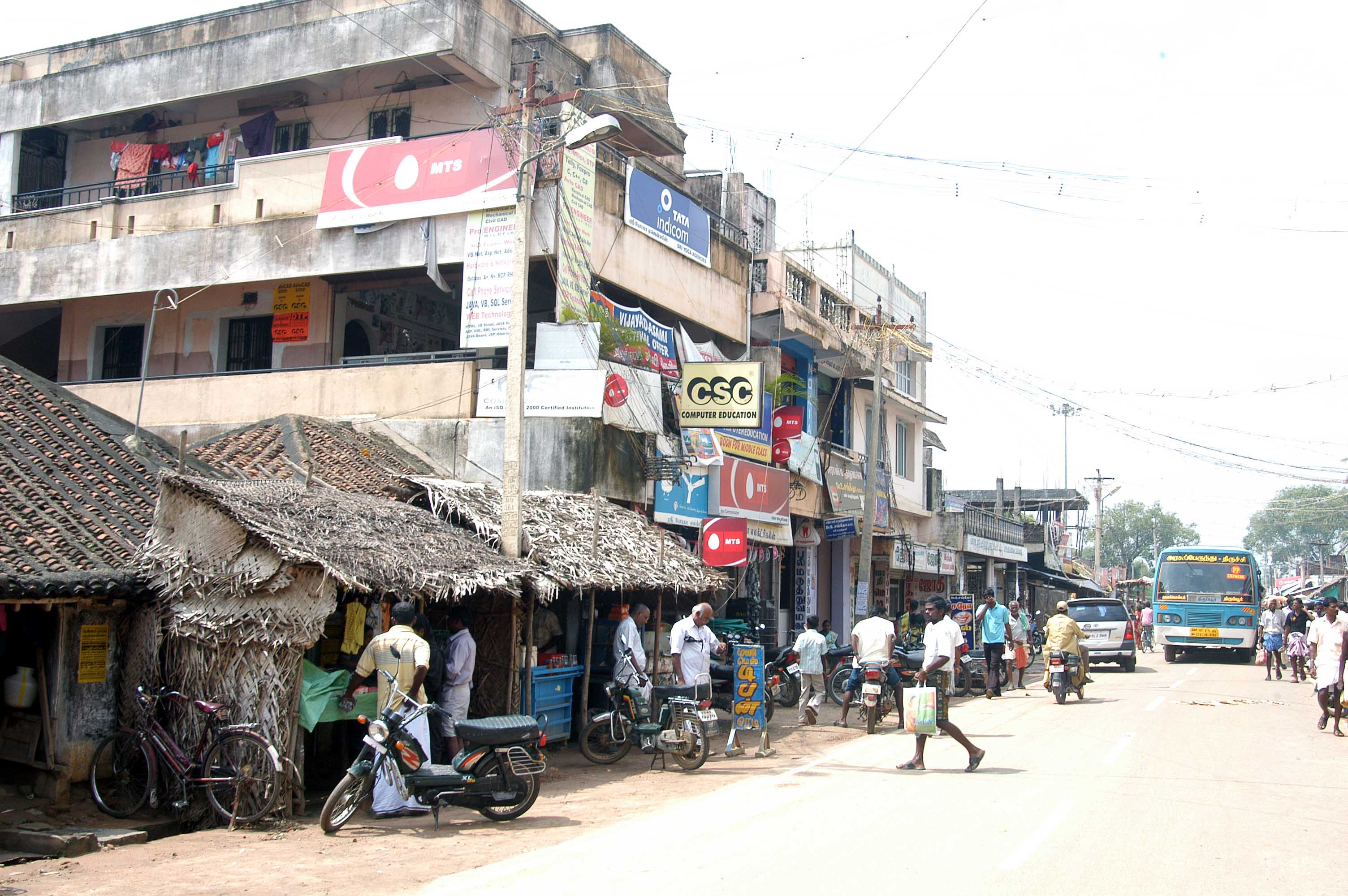
Jayankondam bus stand

Jayankondam bus stand is located in the center of town. The public bus operator TNSTC Jayankondam branch is under the Trichy region of Kumbakonam Corporation. Government and private buses operate to nearby towns, such as Kumbakonam, Mayiladudurai, Virudhachalam, and Bangalore from the Jayankondam bus stand.

The nearest railway stations are Virudhachalam Junction railway station, 40 km away, Ariyalur Railway station, 38 km away, and Kumbakonam Railway station, 30 km away.

The nearest airport is Tiruchirappalli International Airport, 98 km away. The nearest seaport is Karaikal port.

== Demographics ==
Religious census
Religion	Percent(%)
Hindu	92.63%
Muslim	4.53%
Christian	2.42%
Sikh	0.06%
Buddhist	0.01%
Jain	0.01%
Other	0.31%
No religion	0.03%

According to the 2011 census, Jayankondam had a population of 33,945 with a sex ratio of 1,031 females for every 1,000 males, much above the national average of 929. A total of 3,520 people were under the age of six, constituting 1,866 males and 1,654 females. Scheduled Castes and Scheduled Tribes accounted for 17.88% and 2.06% of the population, respectively. The town's average literacy was 72%, compared to the national average of 72.99%.

The town had a total of 8664 households. There were a total of 12,359 workers, comprising 611 cultivators, 1,386 main agricultural laborers, 1,004 in-household industries, 7,592 other workers, 1,766 marginal workers, 87 marginal cultivators, 736 marginal agricultural laborers, 329 marginal workers in household industries, and 614 other marginal workers.

As per the religious census of 2011, Jayankondam (M) had 92.63% Hindus, 4.53% Muslims, 2.42% Christians, 0.06% Sikhs, 0.01% Buddhists, 0.01% Jains, 0.31% following other religions and 0.03% following no religion or did not indicate any religious preference.

== History ==
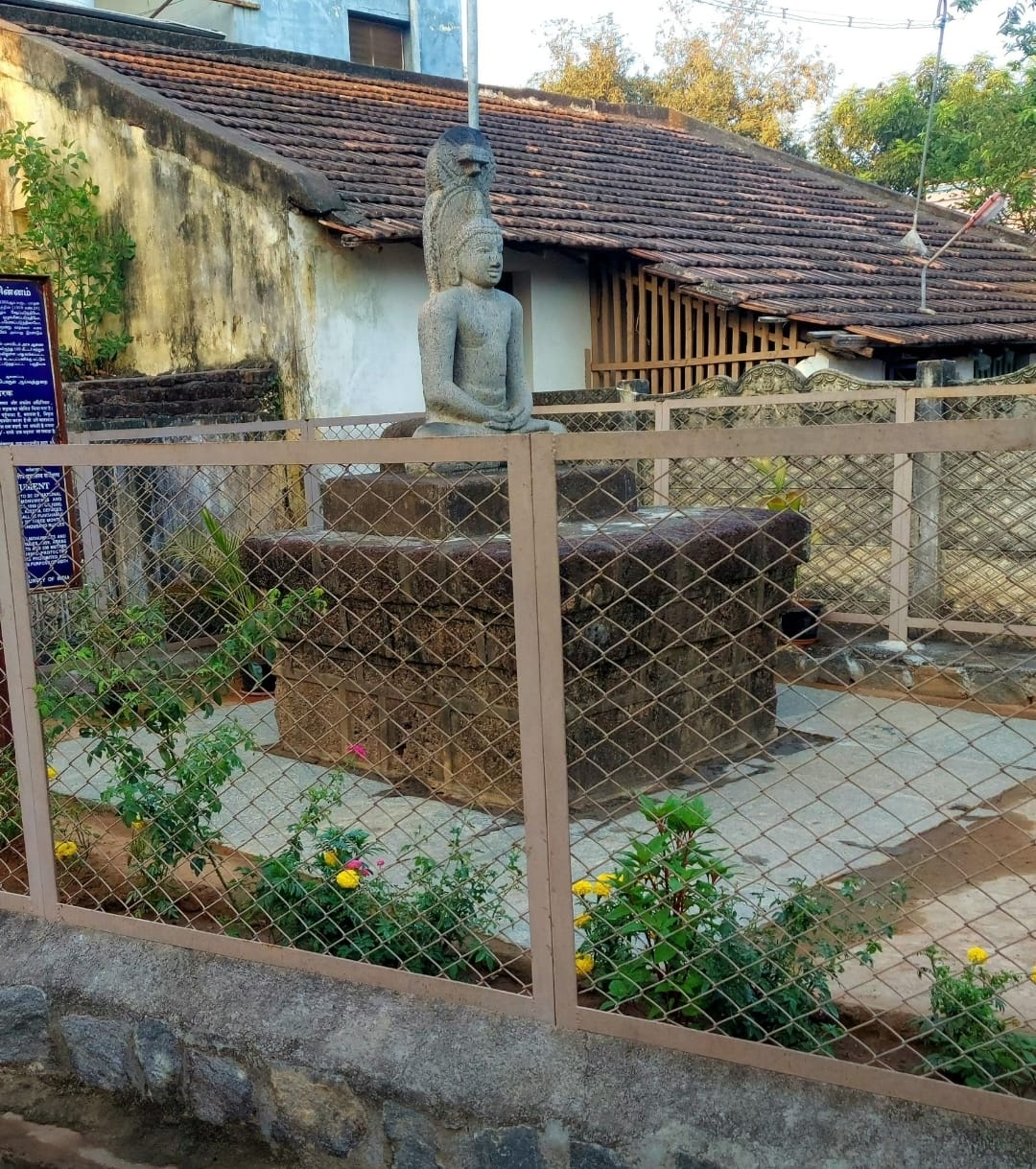
Buddha statue at Jayankondam, maintained by the Archeological Department of India

Jayankondam's full name is Jayankondacholapuram. The town's original name was Nellimanagramam, but it was renamed as Jayankondacholapuram (Tamil: ஜெயங்கொண்டசோழபுரம்) during the period of King Rajendracholan (ராஜேந்திரசோழன்) after Rajendra and his son were victorious in many wars and campaigns. Jayankondam was established as a town panchayat during British rule. Jayankondam was upgraded to the second municipality of the Perambalur district after Perambalur.

== Administration and politics ==
Jayankondam is a second-grade municipality. Jayankondam comes under the Jayankondam State Assembly Constituency, and it elects a member to the Tamil Nadu Legislative Assembly once every five years. Before 2009, Jayankondam was part of the Perambalur Lok Sabha constituency. After 2009, Jayankondam came under the Chidambaram Lok Sabha constituency.

== Notable sights ==
=== Gangaikonda Cholapuram ===
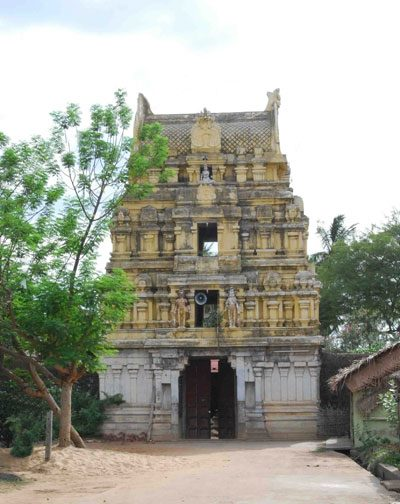
Historical Shiva temple built by the wife of Rajendra Cholan

Gangaikonda Cholapuram was the capital of the Chola dynasty in c. 1025 during the reign of Rajendra Chola I, and served as the Chola capital for around 250 years. The village is 8 km from Jayankondam. The city was founded by Rajendra Chola I to commemorate his victory over the Pala Dynasty. The name means the town of the Cholas, who took over the Ganga (water from the Ganga) or defeated the kings near the Ganga. It is now a small village, its past eminence only remembered by the existence of the great Brihadisvara Temple. The temple has been recognised as a World Heritage site by UNESCO. The Chola empire included the whole of southern India to the river Thungabadhra in the north. For administrative and strategic purposes, they built another capital and named it Gangaikondacholapuram.

=== Anaikarai ===
Anaikarai is 15 km from Jayankondam. Nearly 2,000 families live in Anaikarai, with the main occupations being agriculture and fishing. It is a well-known place for river fish.

=== Lower Anaicut dam ===
The Lower Anaicut dam was built by Sir Arthur Cotton in the 19th century across Coleroon, the major distributary of Cauvery, and is said to be a replicated structure of Kallanai.

=== Temples ===
The Historical Shiva temple in Jayankondam was built by the wife of Rajendra Cholan (queen) for her personal worship during the king's victory celebration over the Pala dynasty.
