= Elaiyur (East) =

- village
- Country: India
- State: Tamil Nadu Pin number 621806
- District: Ariyalur

Population (2001)
  - Total: 5,443

Languages
  - Official: Tamil
- Time zone: UTC+5:30 (IST)
- Vehicle registration: TN-
- Coastline: 0 kilometres (0 mi)
- Sex ratio: 1049 ♂/♀
- Literacy: 60.39%

Elaiyur (East) is a village in the Udayarpalayam taluk of Ariyalur district, Tamil Nadu, India.

== Demographics ==
At the 2001 census, Elaiyur (East) had a population of 5,443 (2,657 males and 2,786 females).

The village covers a geographical area of 656.67 ha (1,622.7 acres). The population density of Elaiyur (East) is 3 persons per hectare and the village has a total of 597 households.

One of the famous festival in Elaiyur Selliyammen Koil Festival

== Schools ==
- Government High School, Poovanipattu
