= Vilandhai =

- village
- Location in Tamil Nadu, India Vilandhai (India)
- Coordinates: 11°19′36.22″N 79°23′8.07″E
- Country: India
- State: Tamil Nadu
- District: Ariyalur

Population (2001)
  - Total: 11,675

Languages
  - Official: Tamil
- Time zone: UTC+5:30 (IST)
- Nearest city: Andimadam
- Sex ratio: 1.009 ♂/♀

Vilandhai is a village nearer to Andimadam in the Ariyalur district of Tamil Nadu, India. Vilandhai is divided into Vilandhai-North and Vilandhai-South.

== Etymology ==
The Bilva trees were surrounding the Lord Agatheswarar temple, so the place was called Vilandhai.

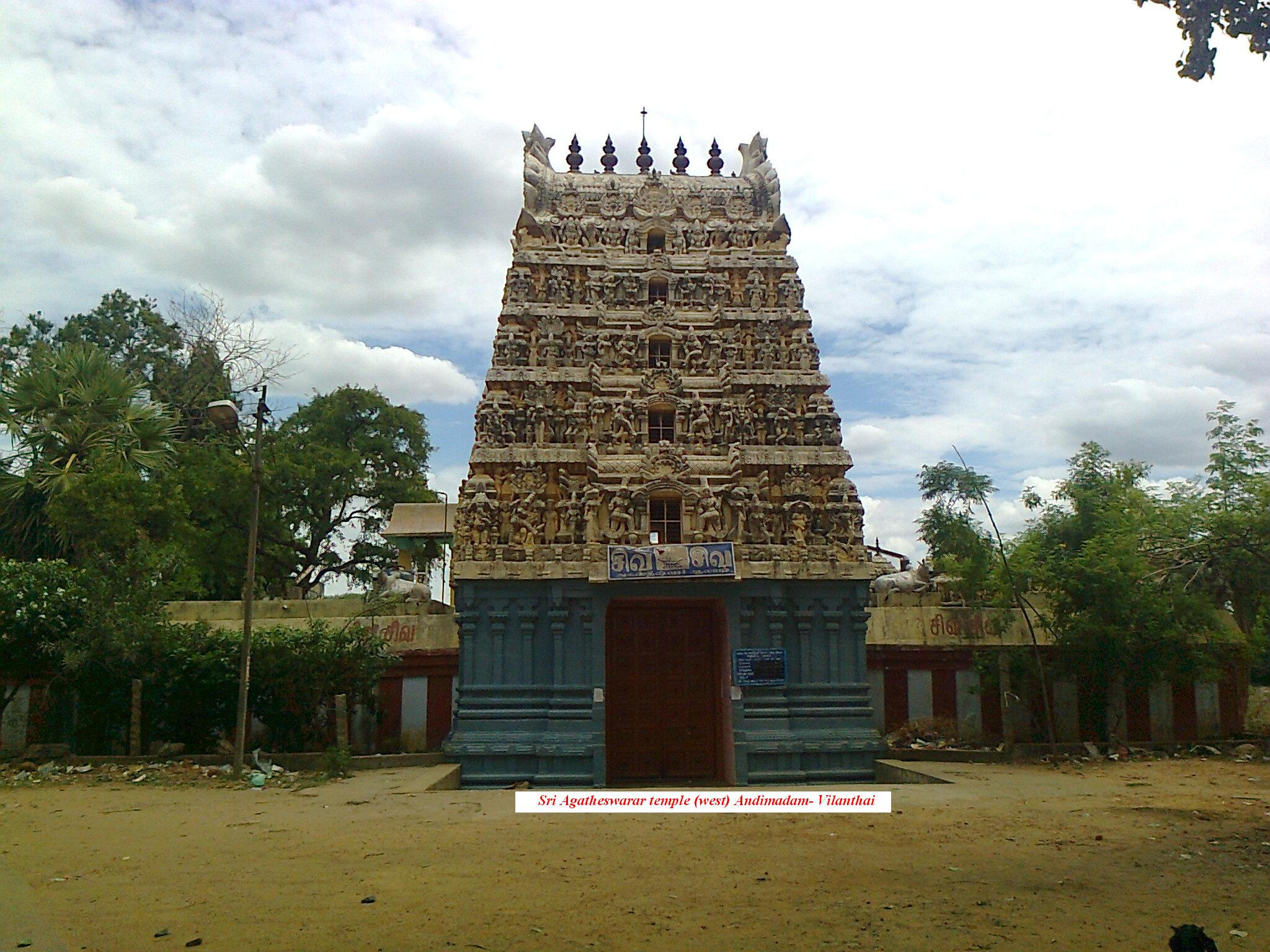
Lord Agatheswarar Temple in Andimadam-621801

== Demographics ==
As per the 2001 census, Vilandhai-South had a total population of 9663 with 4855 males and 4808 females, while Vilandhai-North had a total population of 2012 with 1009 males and 1003 females.

The main occupation of the residents is weaving.
