= Angarayanallur (East) =

- village
- Location in Tamil Nadu, India Angarayanallur (East) (India)
- Coordinates: 11°9′37″N 79°22′14″E
- Country: India
- State: Tamil Nadu
- District: Ariyalur

Population (2001)
  - Total: 2,944

Languages
  - Official: Tamil
- Time zone: UTC+5:30 (IST)
- Vehicle registration: TN-
- Coastline: 0 kilometres (0 mi)
- Sex ratio: 1001 ♂/♀
- Literacy: 70.58%

Angarayanllur (East) is a village in the Udayarpalayam taluk of Ariyalur district, Tamil Nadu, India.

== Demographics ==
As per the 2001 census, Angarayanallur (East) had a total population of 2944 with 1471 males and 1473 females.
