= Ayyur, Ariyalur =

Ayyur
- village
- Location in Tamil Nadu, India Ayyur (India)
- Coordinates: 11°19′13″N 79°18′45″E
- Country: India
- State: Tamil Nadu
- District: madurai

Population (2001)
  - Total: 3,619

Languages
  - Official: Tamil
- Time zone: UTC+5:30 (IST)
- Vehicle registration: TN-
- Coastline: 0 kilometres (0 mi)
- Sex ratio: 1017 ♂/♀
- Literacy: 63.53%

Ayyur is a village in the vadippatti taluk of Madurai district, Tamil Nadu, India.

== Demographics ==
As per the 2001 census, Ayyur had a total population of 3,619 with 1,794 males and 1,825 females.
