= Andimadam =

Andimadam Andiyar
- Town
- Location in Tamil Nadu, India Andimadam (India)
- Coordinates: 11°20′7″N 79°22′33″E
- Country: India
- State: Tamil Nadu
- District: Ariyalur

Population (2011)
  - Total: 6,165

Languages
  - Official: Tamil
- Time zone: UTC+5:30 (IST)
- PIN: 621801
- Telephone code: 04331
- Vehicle registration: TN-61
- Coastline: 0 kilometres (0 mi)
- Nearest city: jayamkondacholapuram
- Sex ratio: 1016 ♂/♀
- Literacy: 72.65%
- Lok Sabha constituency: Chidambaram

Andimadam is a Panchayat town and taluk in Tamil Nadu. It is one of the block in Ariyalur district Ariyalur district "Land Of Cement", Tamil Nadu, India.

== Demographics ==
As per the 2011 census, Andimadam had a total population of 6,165 with 3,107 males and 3,058 females.

Andimadam is located 50 km away from Ariyalur, the main city of the district. Andiamdam is situated 242 kilometers south of Chennai, 111 kilometers north-east of Tiruchirappalli, and 23 kilometers north-west of Gangai Konda Cholapuram.

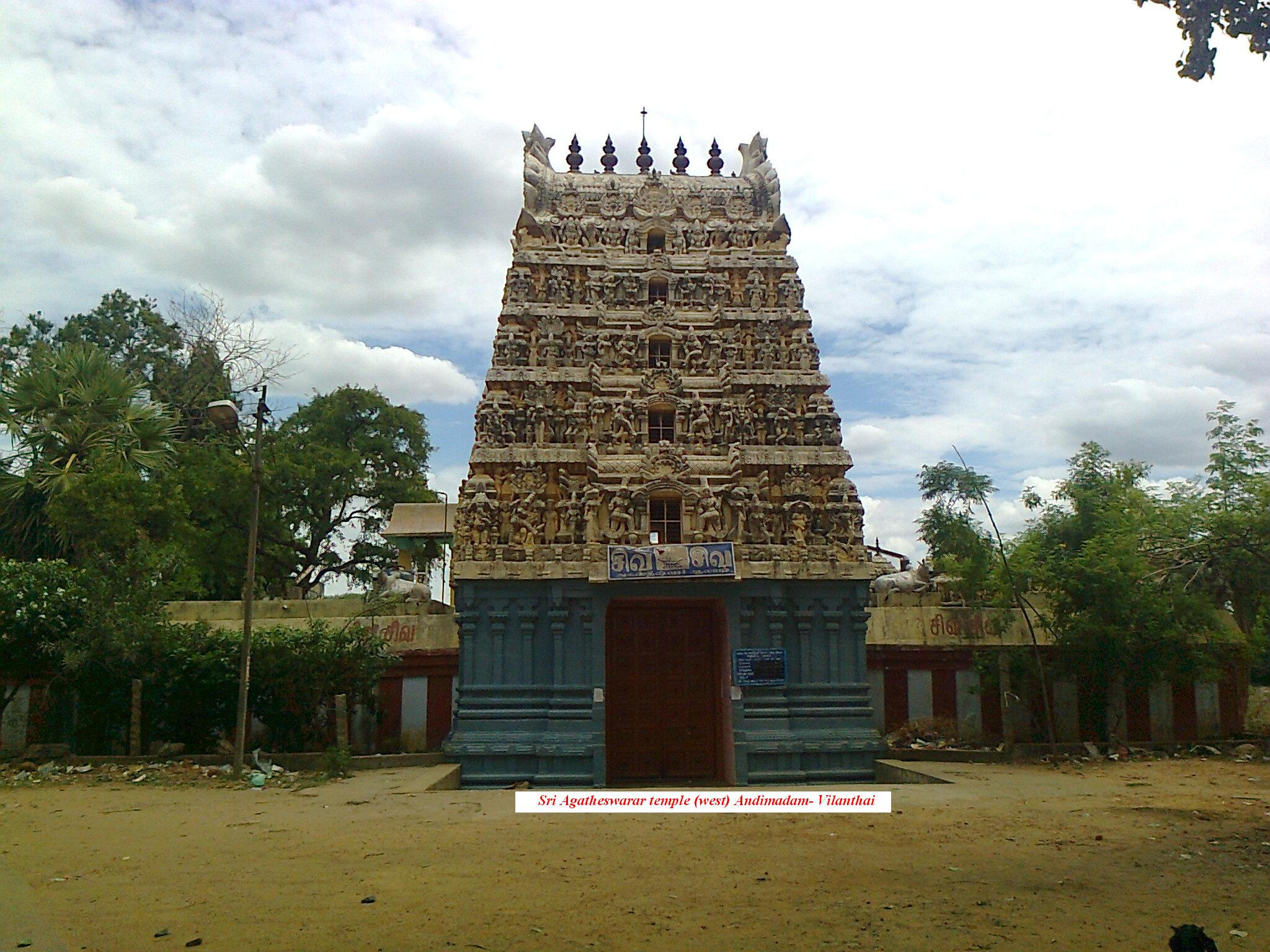
Lord Agatheswarar Temple in Andimadam-621801

== Religion ==
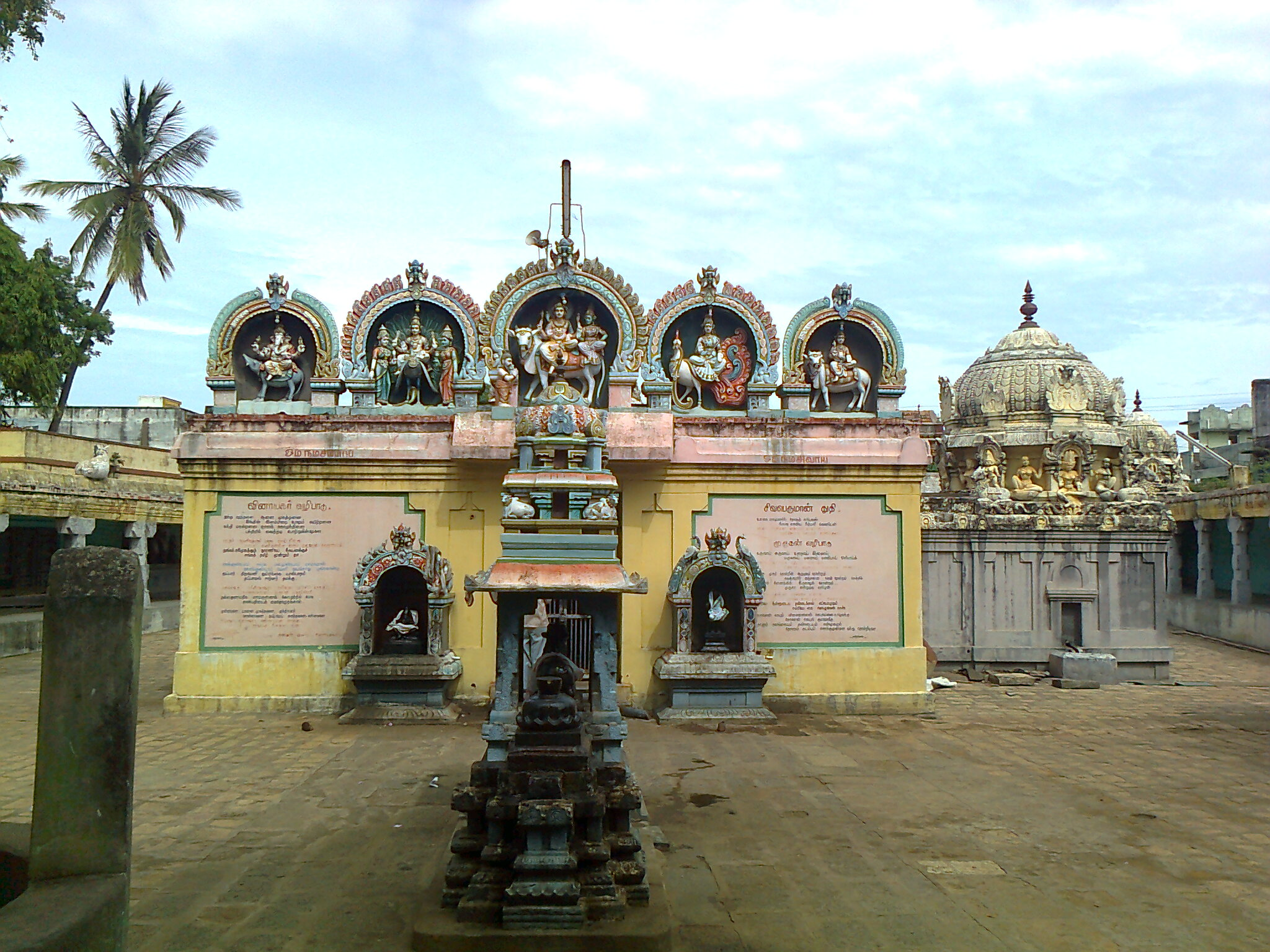
Inner view of Agatheswarar temple

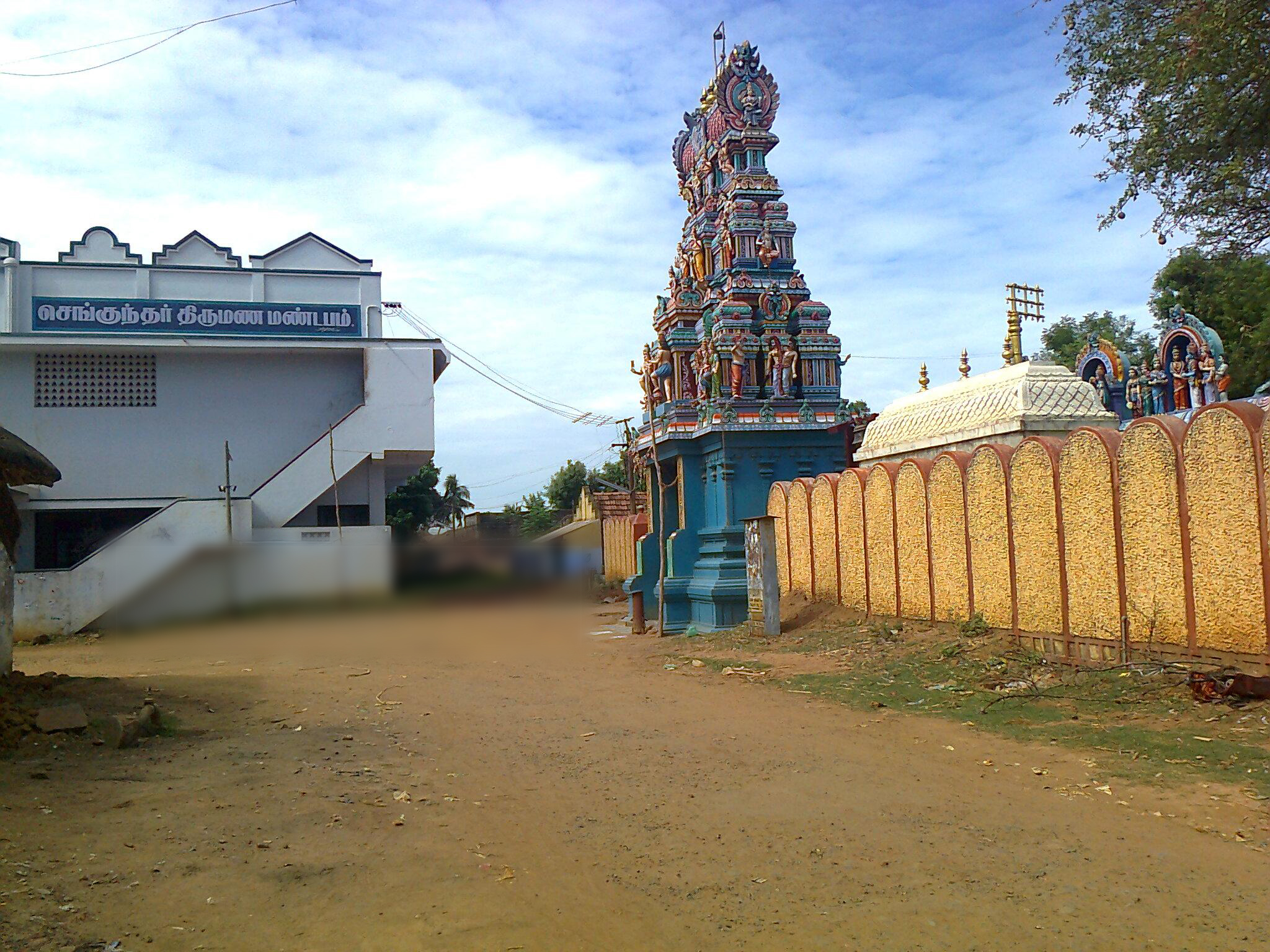
Lord Murugan Temple(1993) Located in Subramaniyapuram, Vilanthai

There are several temples and a church. The ancient Lord Siva temple is located in the center of Andimadam.

== See also ==
- List of villages in Ariyalur district
