= Siyakh Darengun District =

District in Fars province, Iran

Siyakh Darengun District Persian: بخش سیاخ دارنگون
- District
- Location within Iran
- Coordinates: 29°23′11″N 52°21′13″E
- Country: Iran
- Province: Fars
- County: Shiraz
- Capital: Kedenj
- Time zone: UTC+3:30 (IRST)

Siyakh Darengun District (Persian: بخش سیاخ دارنگون) is in Shiraz County, Fars province, Iran. Its capital is the village of Kedenj, whose population at the time of the 2016 National Census was 2,116 people in 607 households.

== History ==
After the 2016 census, Siyakh Darengun Rural District (Note: Renamed Siyakh Rural District) was separated from the Central District in the formation of Siyakh Darengun District.

== Demographics ==
=== Administrative divisions ===
Siyakh Darengun District
Administrative Divisions
Darengun RD
Siyakh RD (Note: Formerly Siyakh Darengun Rural District)
RD = Rural District
