= Siyakh Rural District =

Rural district in Fars province, Iran

Siyakh Rural District Persian: دهستان سیاخ
- Rural District
- Location within Iran
- Coordinates: 29°26′32″N 52°23′04″E
- Country: Iran
- Province: Fars
- County: Shiraz
- District: Siyakh Darengun
- Capital: Bab Ayur

Population (2016)
  - Total: 10,674
- Time zone: UTC+3:30 (IRST)

Siyakh Rural District (Persian: دهستان سیاخ) (Note: Formerly Siyakh Darengun Rural District (دهستان سياخ دارنگون)) is in Siyakh Darengun District of Shiraz County, Fars province, Iran. Its capital is the village of Bab Ayur. The previous capital of the rural district was the village of Kedenj.

== Demographics ==
=== Population ===
At the time of the 2006 National Census, the rural district's population (as Siyakh Darengun Rural District of the Central District) was 10,890 in 2,503 households. There were 12,576 inhabitants in 3,122 households at the following census of 2011. The 2016 census measured the population of the rural district as 10,674 in 3,077 households. The most populous of its 39 villages was Kedenj, with 2,116 people.

After the census, the rural district was separated from the district in the establishment of Siyakh Darengun District and renamed Siyakh Rural District.
