= Udayarpalayam taluk =

Taluk of Ariyalur district of the Indian state of Tamil Nadu

Coordinates: 11°10′58″N 79°16′32″E

Udayarpalayam taluk is a taluk of Ariyalur district of the Indian state of Tamil Nadu. The headquarters of the taluk is the town of Jayankondam.

== Demographics ==
According to the 2011 census, the taluk of Udayarpalayam had a population of 384,800 with 190,974 males and 193,826 females. There were 1015 women for every 1000 men. The taluk had a literacy rate of 65.6. Child population in the age group below 6 was 20,417 males and 17,971 females.

== Towns and villages ==
- Adichanur
- Aiyur
- Alagapuram
- Amanakkanthondi
- Ambapur
- Anaikudam
- Andimadam
- Angarayanallur
- Anikudichan
- Athukurichi
- Ayyappannayakkan Pettai
- Cholamadevi
- Darmasamudram
- Devamangalam
- Devanur
- Edankanni
- Edayar
- Elaiyur-East
- Elaiyur-West
- Elayaperumalnallur
- Eravangudi
- GangaiKonda Cholapuram
- Govindaputhur
- Gunamangalam
- Idayakurichi
- Irugaiyur
- jayankondam
- K. Vallam
- Kachi Perumal
- Kadambur
- Kaduvettankurichy
- Kallathur
- Kaluvan Thondi
- Karai Kurichy
- Karukai
- Kasan Kottai
- Kattagaram-North
- Kattagaram-South
- Kattathur-North
- Kattathur-South
- Kilanatham
- Kodali Karuppur
- Kodangudi-North
- Kodangudi-South
- Kodukkur
- Kovil Valkai
- Kulothunganallur
- Kundaveli-East
- Kundaveli-West
- Kuruvalapparkoil
- Kuvagam
- Kuvathur
- Managathy
- Marudur
- Melur
- Muthuservamadam
- Nagam Panthal
- Nayaganaipriyal
- Nedavalur-East
- Nedavalur-South
- Olayur
- Padanilai
- Pappakudi-North
- Pappakudi-South
- Parukkal (East)
- Periyakrishnapuram
- Periyavalayam
- Pichanur
- Pilichikuzhi
- Piranjeri
- Porpathintha Nallur
- Rangiyam
- Saluppai
- Sathampady
- Silambur
- Siluvacheri
- Sirukadambur
- Solankurichi
- Sripuranthan
- Sriraman
- Suriyamanal
- Suthamalli
- T.Paluvur
- Taludalamedu
- Thandalai
- Thathanur
- Thenkatchi Perumal Nathan
- Thirukalapur
- Udayanatham
- Udayarpalayam
- Udayavarathianur
- Ulkottai
- Ulliyakudi
- Valaikurichy
- Vanathirayanpattinam
- Vangudi
- Varadarajampettai
- Variyankaval
- Vembukudy
- Venmankondan (East, West)
- Vethiyarvettu or Vettiyarvettu
- Vettiyarvettu-Rf
- Vilandhai
- Viluthudiyan

== Brihadeeswarar Temple, Sripuranthan ==
The district became famous in 2008, when theft of eight idols were discovered from a 9th-century Chola Brihadeeswarar Temple at Sripuranthan village was discovered by Archaeological Survey of India(ASI) Government of India officials. One of these idols, the Sripuranthan Natarajan Idol found its way to the National Gallery of Australia. Two of the stolen statues were consequently returned and are now displayed in the Government Museum at Kumbakonam.
