= Astin Dar =

Astin Dar (Persian: استين در) may refer to:

- Astin Dar-e Olya
- Astin Dar-e Sofla
- Astin Dar-e Vosta
