= Kharzan =

Kharzan (Persian: خرزان or خارزن) may refer to:

- Kharzan, Isfahan (خارزن - Khārzan)
- Kharzan, Qazvin (خرزان - Kharzān)
