= Kharakan =

Kharakan (Persian: خاركان) may refer to:

- Kharakan, Fars
- Kharakan, Qazvin
