= Senjanak =

Senjanak or Sanjanak (Persian: سنجانك), also rendered as Sinjanak or Sindzhanak, may refer to:

- Sanjanak, Fars
- Senjanak, Qazvin
