= Bikandi =

Bikandi may refer to:

- Bak Kandi, village in Khazvin Province, Iran, also known as Bikandi

== People with the name ==
- Uri Ruiz Bikandi (1950-2023), Spanish philologist and educator
