= Patar =

Patar may refer to:

== People ==
- Maitrayee Patar (born 1990), an Indian writer, poet and musical artist
- Surjit Patar (1945-2024), a Punjabi-language poet from India
- Vincent Patar (born 1965), a Belgian filmmaker

== Places ==
- Fetr, a village in Qazvin Province, Iran, also known as Patar
- Patar, Iran, a village in Sistan and Baluchestan Province
- An old name for the town of Paat in Sindh, Pakistan
- Patar, Senegal, a commune of Senegal
- Patar, Tajikistan
