= Beyg Baghi =

Beyg Baghi (Persian: بيگ باغي) may refer to:

- Beyg Baghi, Ardabil
- Beyg Baghi, Qazvin
