= Hurin (disambiguation) =

Hurin may refer to:

- Húrin Thalion, a hero of the First Age in J. R. R. Tolkien's Middle-earth legendarium
- Hurin, Iran, a village in Qazvin Province
- Hurin (The Wheel of Time), a character in Robert Jordan's The Wheel of Time series
- Hurin dynasty of Sapa Incas
- Silas Hurin, one of the original owners of the land where Lebanon, Ohio was built
