= Kharzan, Qazvin =

Kharzan خرزان
- Village
- Location within Iran
- Coordinates: 36°30′40″N 49°37′24″E
- Country: Iran
- Province: Qazvin
- County: Qazvin
- Bakhsh: Kuhin
- Rural District: Ilat-e Qaqazan-e Gharbi

Population (2006)
  - Total: 50
- Time zone: UTC+3:30 (IRST)
  - Summer (DST): UTC+4:30 (IRDT)

Kharzan (Persian: خرزان, also Romanized as Kharzān) is a village in Ilat-e Qaqazan-e Gharbi Rural District, Kuhin District, Qazvin County, Qazvin Province, Iran. At the 2006 census, its population was 50, in 23 families.
