= Bashar, Iran =

Village in Qazvin province, Iran

Bashar Persian: بشر
- Village
- Location within Iran
- Coordinates: 36°20′02″N 49°44′19″E
- Country: Iran
- Province: Qazvin
- County: Qazvin
- District: Kuhin
- Rural District: Ilat-e Qaqazan-e Sharqi

Population (2016)
  - Total: 700
- Time zone: UTC+3:30 (IRST)

Bashar (Persian: بشر) is a village in Ilat-e Qaqazan-e Sharqi Rural District of Kuhin District in Qazvin County, Qazvin province, Iran.

== Demographics ==
=== Population ===
At the time of the 2006 National Census, the village's population was 787 in 167 households. The following census in 2011 counted 805 people in 216 households. The 2016 census measured the population of the village as 700 people in 210 households.
