= Buchinak-e Jadid =

Buchinak-e Jadid بوچينك جديد
- Village
- Location within Iran
- Coordinates: 36°22′09″N 49°43′07″E
- Country: Iran
- Province: Qazvin
- County: Qazvin
- Bakhsh: Kuhin
- Rural District: Ilat-e Qaqazan-e Sharqi

Population (2006)
  - Total: 95
- Time zone: UTC+3:30 (IRST)
  - Summer (DST): UTC+4:30 (IRDT)

Buchinak-e Jadid (Persian: بوچينك جديد, also Romanized as Būchīnak-e Jadīd; also known as Būchīnak, Bechīnak, Bichang, and Bichnak) is a village in Ilat-e Qaqazan-e Sharqi Rural District, Kuhin District, Qazvin County, Qazvin Province, Iran. At the 2006 census, its population was 95, in 27 families.
