= Mianej, Qazvin =

Mianej ميانج
- Village
- Location within Iran
- Coordinates: 36°26′04″N 49°51′17″E
- Country: Iran
- Province: Qazvin
- County: Qazvin
- Bakhsh: Kuhin
- Rural District: Ilat-e Qaqazan-e Sharqi

Population (2006)
  - Total: 171
- Time zone: UTC+3:30 (IRST)
  - Summer (DST): UTC+4:30 (IRDT)

Mianej (Persian: ميانج, also Romanized as Mīānej; also known as Mīāneh and Miyana) is a village in Ilat-e Qaqazan-e Sharqi Rural District, Kuhin District, Qazvin County, Qazvin Province, Iran. At the 2006 census, its population was 171, in 46 families.
