= Dunsterforce =

Allied military force in the Middle East during WWI

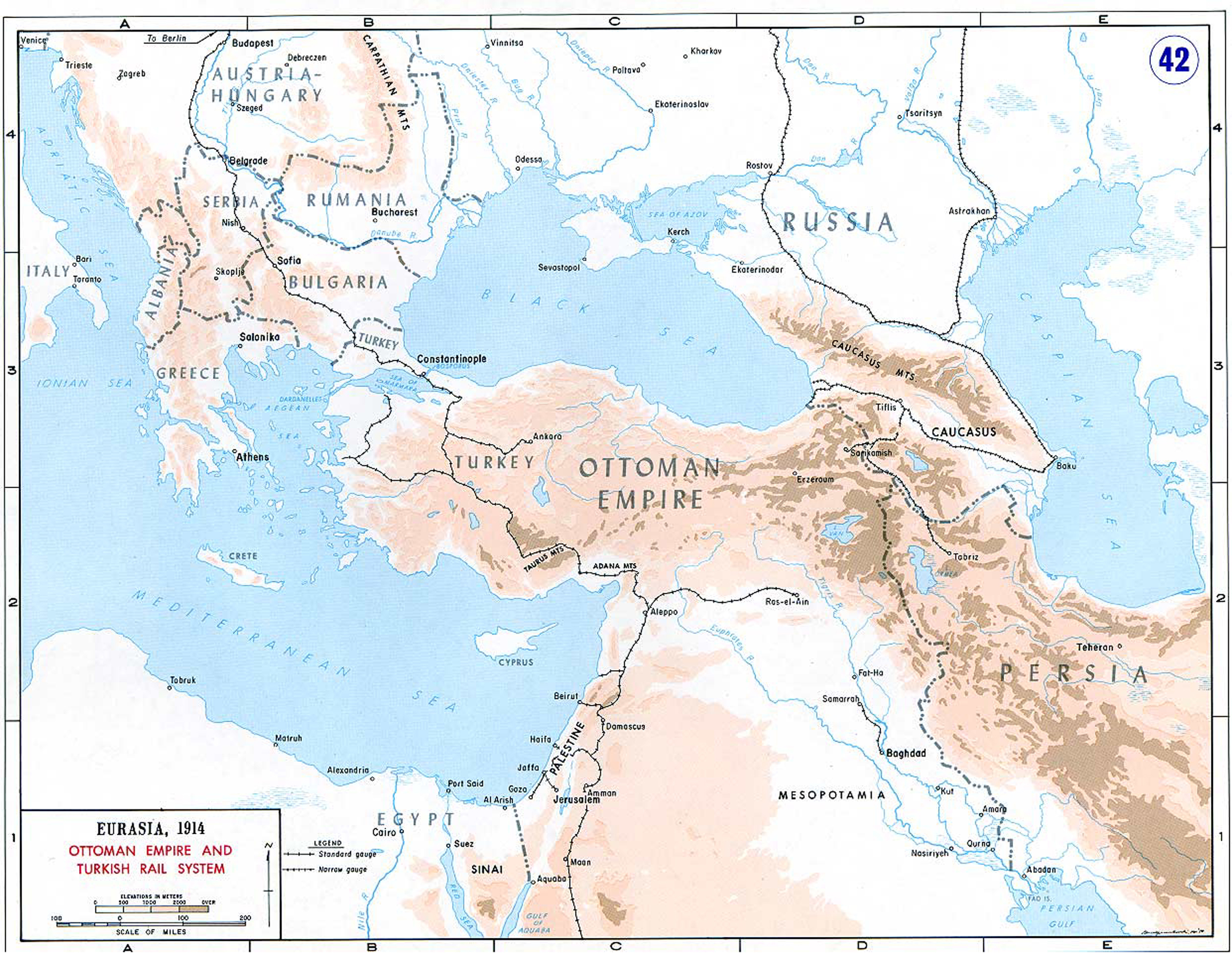
- Map of the Ottoman Empire, Caucasus and Iran (Persia) in the First World War
- Active: December 1917 – 17 September 1918
- Country: (United Kingdom) British Empire
- Allegiance: Allies
- Branch: Army
- Type: Infantry
- Role: Detachment
- Size: 350 men; later reinforced by 39th Infantry Brigade
- Engagements: Battle of Baku

Commanders
- Notable commanders: Lionel Dunsterville

Dunsterforce was an Allied military force, established in December 1917 and named after its commander, Major-General Lionel Dunsterville. The force comprised fewer than 350 Australian, New Zealand, British and Canadian officers and NCOs, who were drawn from the Western and Mesopotamian fronts. The force was intended to organise local units in northern Iran (Persia) and South Caucasus, to replace the Tsarist army that had fought the Ottoman armies in Armenia. The Russians had also occupied northern Iran in co-operation with the British occupation of southern Iran, to create a cordon to prevent German and Ottoman agents from reaching Central Asia, Afghanistan and India.

In July 1918, Captain Stanley Savige, five officers and fifteen NCOs of Dunsterforce, set out towards Urmia and were caught up in an exodus of Armenians and Assyrians, after the town had been captured by the Ottoman Army. About 80,000 people had fled and the Dunsterforce party helped hold off the Ottoman pursuit and attempts by local Kurds to get revenge on the Assyrians for their earlier plundering. By the time the rearguard reached Bijar on 17 August, the Dunsterforce party was so worn out that only four men recovered before the war ended. A combined infantry and cavalry brigade was raised from the Assyrian survivors to re-capture Urmia and the rest of the civilians were sent to refugee camps at Baqubah near Baghdad.

Dunsterville and the rest of the force, with reinforcements from the 39th Infantry Brigade, drove in 500 Ford vans and armoured cars about 220 mi (350 km) from Hamadan across Qajar Iran to Baku. Dunsterforce fought in the Battle of Baku from 26 August to 14 September 1918 and abandoned the city on the night of 14/15 September, to be disbanded two days later. North Persia Force (Norper Force, Major-General William Thomson) took over command of the troops in northern Iran. Troops diverted from Dunsterforce in Sweet's Column opposed an Ottoman diversion from Tabriz, on the Persian road, during September; the situation was transformed by news of the great British victory in the Battle of Megiddo in Palestine (19–25 September). The Islamic Army of the Caucasus was the only source of Ottoman reinforcements and had to give up divisions, ending offensive operations in the theatre.

== Background ==
=== North-West Frontier ===
Britain and Russia had played The Great Game for influence in Central Asia from the early nineteenth century but in the 1880s, Russian absorption of the local Khanates and Emirates restricted British influence. The Anglo-Russian Convention of 1907 ended the rivalry by defining spheres of influence in Afghanistan, Iran and Tibet. Early in the First World War, British and Indian forces set up the East Persia Cordon with Seistan Force assembled from the Indian Army. The force was created to counter German, Austrian and Ottoman subversion in Afghanistan and the North West Frontier of British India. Two squadrons of the 28th Cavalry Regiment and the locally raised South Persia Rifles patrolled the border of Baluchistan and the Persian Empire. The Russian Revolution of 1917 led to the collapse of the convention; the dissolution of the Tsarist armies from March 1917 left open the Caspian Sea and the route from Baku to Krasnovodsk and Central Asia to the Central Powers. In the spring of 1918, German and Ottoman forces advanced into Transcaucasia and Central Asia.

=== Iran ===
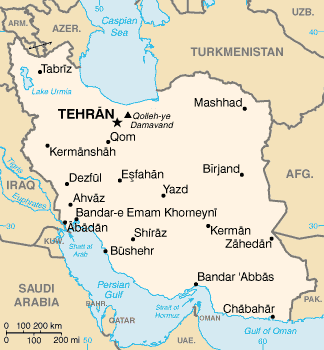
Map of Iran

Russian policy towards Iran in 1914 was based on assurances that Iranian territorial integrity would be respected. Tsarist expansion in northern Iran and opposition to the emergence of a stable modern state, led to suspicion that its policy was really to keep Iran as a dependency or to absorb more of its northern provinces. Britain traditionally sought to maintain commercial interests in the country and the use of naval power to protect India. The geographical position of Iran, between Europe and India and the ancient west–east trade routes through Iranian provinces, had led the British in the nineteenth century to follow a policy of using Iran as a buffer state. The British in practice preferred inaction, although it enabled Russian expansionism until the Anglo-Russian Convention (Anglo-Russian Entente) of 1907.

The Russian sphere ran from Meshed in the east to Tabriz in the west and as far south as Teheran and the British sphere ran west of the North-West Frontier of India and the Afghan border, west to the vicinity of Bandar Abbas on the Persian Gulf. Only the Ottoman Empire remained as a possible field for German diplomatic and economic influence. Traditional Ottoman hostility to Iran on religious grounds meant that the Pan-Islamism of Sultan Abdul Hamid II of the Ottoman Empire failed to gain much of a following in Iran, until the Young Persians took it up as a political tool. The Young Turks in the Ottoman Empire evolved into Pan-Turanists, seeking to renew the Ottoman Empire by expanding into Trans-Caucasia, Turkestan and at least the north-west of Iran. By 1914 little attention had been paid to the Pan-Turanists, mainly due to the power of the Russian Empire; Ottoman encroachments on Iran were seen as defensive moves against Russia.

In 1914, British forces from India occupied Iranian territory east of the Shatt al-Arab waterway, to guard oil concessions in Iran and in 1915 advanced up the Tigris river to Ctesiphon near Baghdad, before being defeated by the Ottoman army and forced to retreat to Kut. During the Siege of Kut (7 December 1915 – 29 April 1916), the Ottomans defeated three relief attempts and refused an offer of £2,000,000 to ransom the garrison, which surrendered at the end of April. Hopes of a Russian relief force from the Caspian Sea through Kermanshah and Khanaqin (Khanikin) to Baghdad failed to materialise. From May–November 1916, the British consolidated a hold on Ottoman territory to the west of Iran around Basra and the confluence of the Euphrates and Tigris at the head of the Persian Gulf. In 1917 the British campaign in Mesopotamia continued, with advances to Baghdad and towards the oilfields of Mosul as the campaign in the Levant led to the occupation of Palestine. A Russian invasion of 1915 from Caucasus established bases at Resht, Kazvin and Teheran and led to inconclusive operations between the Russians and Ottomans further west, closer to the Iranian–Ottoman border.

=== Caucasia ===
In January 1915, the British Cabinet had canvassed possible diversionary attacks against the Ottoman Empire after appeals for support from the Russian Empire. The British planned operations against the Ottoman Empire in the Aegean Sea, eastern Mediterranean and a land invasion of the Levant from Egypt, combined with a Russian invasion from Caucasus towards Anatolia and Mesopotamia. In 1917, the Eastern Committee of the War Cabinet considered that British India had been drained of troops and decided to avoid committing more troops to Iran from Europe, by sending a mission of picked men to train local recruits at Tiflis (now Tbilisi), the capital of Georgia. The War Office undertook to send 150 selected officers and 300 NCOs, to organise local forces and replace the Russian Caucasus Army. Another force was to be raised in north-western Iran by Lieutenant-General W. R. Marshall, commander of the III (Indian) Corps of the Mesopotamian Expeditionary Force (MEF, Lieutenant-General Frederick Stanley Maude); the French took responsibility for the area north of Caucasus.

In Armenia, the local Christians had been sympathetic to the Russians and feared that a revival of Ottoman power would lead to more atrocities. It was believed in London that they would be willing recruits and that some Russian soldiers in the region might fight on for pay, despite the Russian Revolution. On 13 April 1918, the Baku Soviet Commune, a Bolshevik and Left Socialist Revolutionary (SR) faction led by Stepan Shahumyan, was established in Baku, having come to power after the March Days. On 26 July, the Centrocaspian Dictatorship, an anti-Soviet alliance of Russian Socialist-Revolutionaries, Mensheviks and the Armenian Revolutionary Federation (Dashnaks), overthrew the Baku Commune in a bloodless coup. All the factions involved tried to gain support from about 35,000 German and Austro-Hungarian former prisoners of war. Those men willing to fight tended to be sympathetic to the Bolsheviks based in Astrakhan and at Tashkent, the terminus of the Trans-Caspian railway (Central Asian Railway). German and Ottoman armies in eastern Ukraine and Caucasus sent troops and diplomatic missions to Baku and further afield. By September 1918, the Ottoman force in Caucasus was the Eastern Army Group with the 3rd Army, comprising the 3rd Division, 10th Division and the 36th Caucasian Division, the 9th Army with the 9th Division, 11th Caucasian Division, 12th Division and the Independent Cavalry Brigade and the Army of Islam, with the 5th Caucasian Division and the 15th Division.

== Prelude ==
=== Raising of Dunsterforce ===
Dunsterforce was formed in December 1917, to organise local replacements for the Russian Caucasus Army, that had collapsed in the aftermath of the Russian Revolution, the Bolshevik October Revolution (from 7–8 November in the Gregorian calendar) and the Armistice of 15 December. If the new force managed to pass the Persian road from Baghdad to the Caspian Sea and through Baku to Tiflis, it might be impossible to keep the route open and so men of dash and intelligence were sought. About 100 officers and 250 NCOs were raised by quota from the various national and Dominion contingents in France, the largest number coming from the Australians. From 12 to 20 officers and about twenty NCOs each, was requested from the First Australian Imperial Force (AIF) and the Canadian Corps, twelve officers and about ten NCOs from the New Zealand Expeditionary Force (NZEF) and several South Africans. The Canadians sent 15 officers and 26 NCOs of

... strong character, adventurous spirit, especially good stamina, capable of organizing, training, and eventually leading, irregular troops.

— G. W. L. Nicholson

to London by 13 January 1918. Until the "Hush-Hush Party" sailed for the Middle East on 29 January, the War Office kept the men incognito at the Tower of London, with no knowledge of their destination. Eleven Russians and an Iranian accompanied the party and in Egypt, another quota of twenty officers and forty NCOs joined from the Egyptian Expeditionary Force, the group arriving in Basra on 4 March. The force moved up the Tigris to Baghdad by 28 March and began training, having already begun learning Russian and Iranian on the voyage.

=== Dunsterville Mission ===
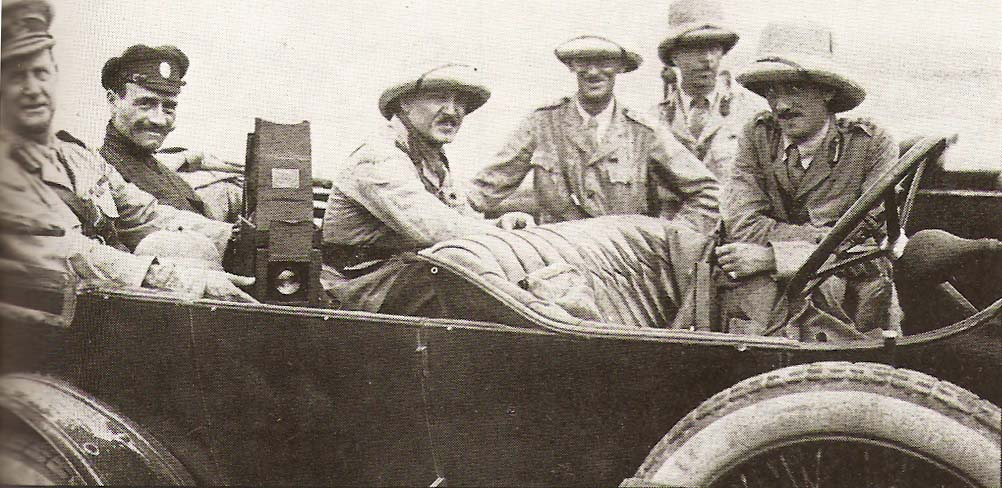
Lionel Dunsterville (far left) with staff

The commander of Dunsterforce, Major-General Lionel Dunsterville, had arrived in Baghdad from India, with his staff and the quota of officers and NCOs drawn from India and Mesopotamia on 18 January, carrying orders to proceed to Tiflis, as the British representative to the Trans-Caucasian Government. The MEF had occupied Baghdad since March 1917 and Marshall, who had taken over the MEF after Maude died in November 1917, sent parties forward to guard the section of the Persian road vacated by the Russian army. (Note: The road runs from Baghdad up the valley of the Diala to Khanaqin (Khanikin), then rises through the Tak-i-Girra Gap onto the Iranian plateau. The going is difficult from the Mesopotamian lowlands through the gap, a bluff along which the road zigzags upwards for 1,000 ft (300 m). The road continues through Kermanshah from Baghdad and Hamadan to Kazvin. The 223 mi (359 km) stretch from Baghdad to Kermanshah is a bottleneck, yet is the obvious route into Iran from the west. (Except for a detour over the Asadabad Pass, north-west of Hamadan, the road follows the line of the Royal Road of Darius the Great.)) Marshall had severe doubts about Dunsterforce, calling it a "mad enterprise" concocted by the War Cabinet against an imagined threat, which would obstruct the main campaign in Mesopotamia. Dunsterville, on arrival at Baghdad, decided that due to the unsettled conditions in the region, he should confer urgently with the British representatives in Tiflis. On 27 January, Dunsterville had set off with eleven officers, four NCOs, four batmen, two clerks and 41 drivers in Ford cars and vans, through the advanced parties of the MEF guarding the road.

The decline of the Russian Army led the Ottomans to advance towards the Caspian Sea, where the Germans and Ottomans intended to capture Baku. Internal disagreements made their progress very slow and in the south after April, Armenians, Assyrians and some Russian troops, managed to stop the advance near Urmia in north-west Iran, about 250 mi (400 km) from the Persian road. Iran was politically unstable and agents of the Central Powers attempted to exacerbate British problems in India; Dunsterforce intended to be an extension of the "cordon" in Iran, intended to prevent the unrest spreading to India. From the British railhead in Mesopotamia to the Caspian shore was about 700 mi (1,100 km) and the motor-column passed through the last British outpost at Pai Tak (also Pai Taq), then drove through Kermanshah 223 mi (359 km) on, Hamadan and then Kazvin 200 mi (320 km) further, to the Elburz mountains, over the 7,400 ft (2,300 m) Bulagh Pass and into the jungle lowlands of Gilan province, home of the Jungle Movement of Gilan (Jangali) led by Kuchik Khan (1880 – 2 December 1921). Around Resht and Bandar-e Anzali on the Caspian coast, German and Austrian agents had established a measure of influence with the Jangali. Dunsterville discovered that thousands of Russian troops, formerly part of the occupation force in northern Iran, under General Nikolai Baratov, were being allowed free passage and on 17 February, the Dunsterville party reached Bandar-e Anzali.

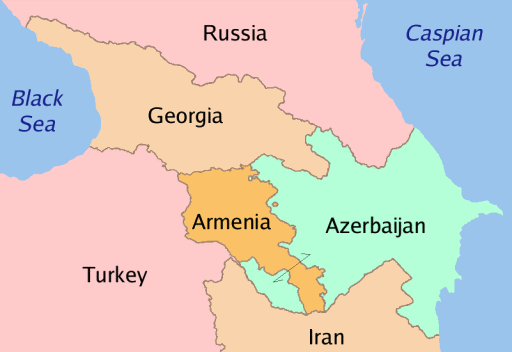
Modern map of Caucasia

After contemplating the hijack of a ship to run the gauntlet of Bolshevik-operated coastal craft, Dunsterville decided not to risk alienating local opinion and turned back, intending to meet the party en route from Europe and make arrangements in Iran, while waiting for another chance to reach Tiflis. On 20 February, the party dodged the local authorities and returned to Hamadan, where it could use MEF and Russian army wireless stations, to keep in touch with Baghdad. It had become clear that there was little chance that the Russians formerly under Baratov could be induced to remain on service and that only Colonel Lazar Bicherakov and some of his Cossacks were willing to continue. On 11 February, Bicherakov flew to Baghdad and told Marshall that the Cossacks were willing to act as rearguard for the Russians before leaving and that the Tiflis initiative was doomed to failure. Marshall wanted an advance on Mosul to protect the Persian road but was over-ruled, in preference for operations in Palestine and at Hamadan, Dunsterville claimed that the Iranian public welcomed British protection and requested that he might wait at Hamadan to try again.

To gain the support of the Iranian public, Dunsterville made an effort to relieve the famine, caused partly by a drought and partly by Russian and Ottoman military operations in north-west Iran. The Dunsterville Mission had plenty of money and recruited local labour to repair roads. By a ruse, Dunsterville got the local grain merchants, mostly supporters of the Democratic Party and in the pay of the Germans, to stop hoarding, which proved very popular. The Democrats retaliated by claiming that the British had poisoned the wheat and sniped at the British in Hamadan but public support for the British increased as the famine relief measures took effect. The Dunsterville Mission was also able to establish an intelligence organisation that saw all telegrams and letters concerning the mission. After the Bicherakov Cossack detachment moved from Kermanshah to Kazvin and blocked the Jangalis from using the Teheran road, the mission was able to arrest the passage of German and Ottoman agents with local levies of Christian Assyrians for local order and security duties. The prisoners were guarded a party of the 1/4th Hampshire and the "Irregulars", a military force was raised from the hill peoples of the north-west closer to the Ottoman border, to oppose an Ottoman move against the Persian road from Armenia.

Baratov sold Dunsterville most of the weapons and supplies of the Russian Army but some were also traded by Russian soldiers to the Persian locals and the Kurdish hill peoples, leaving them exceptionally well armed. By the end of March, all but the Bicherakov Cossack detachment at Kazvin had withdrawn and the MEF extended its hold on the road to Kermanshah, with the 36th Brigade. Dunsterville borrowed some infantry and cavalry and Bicherakov agreed to remain at Kazvin, until British troops could take over. Twenty officers and twenty NCOs of Dunsterforce arrived by Ford car on 3 April, the rest of the force making their way on foot with a mule train, all arriving by 25 May. By the time that the rest of Dunsterforce had arrived, the local and international situation had changed; the success of the German spring offensive in France leading the Georgians to bid for German support; in May the Germans took over part of the Russian Black Sea Fleet. The Ottomans repudiated the Treaty of Brest Litovsk and began to organise Tartars into the Islamic Army of the Caucasus on 25 May, to attack Baku and Iran, making a British move to Tiflis even less likely.

1941 map of Iraq and western Iran showing roads and railways

The Bolsheviks asked for British assistance to reorganise the Black Sea Fleet and it appeared possible that a rapprochement with the Bolsheviks and the Armenians could be arranged, in return for British protection of Baku. Control of the port and shipping on the Caspian Sea might still achieve British and Allied objectives, despite the Ottoman push eastwards into the vacuum left by the decline of the Tsarist army. The War Office and the British command in India considered that the good campaigning weather of a Caucasian summer should be exploited by augmenting Dunsterforce as much as possible. Operations on the Euphrates by the 15th Indian Division of the MEF, surrounded an Ottoman force in the action of Khan Baghdadi (26–27 March) and took 4,000 prisoners. In April, the 2nd Ottoman Division was forced back from the Persian road, after which the MEF advanced into Kurdistan and tried to block the Ottoman retreat towards Kirkuk. Marshall was ordered to advance to Kirkuk, to divert Ottoman forces from their advance through Armenia to the Caspian Sea. The MEF took the town unopposed on 7 May, then retired 55 mi (89 km) to Tuz Khormato and Kifiri, due a shortage of troops and supplies.

The War Office urged Marshall to send a brigade to Dunsterville but he claimed that 1,000 infantry, mounted in Fords and a force of armoured cars, would be sufficient to get beyond Kermanshah. The force could to the Caspian Sea by June and then the waters could be controlled by arming ships; if he was wrong, reinforcements could be sent later. During the discussions, the Bolsheviks in Caucasus requested that Bicherakov attack the Jangalis to protect Baku, to which he agreed, in return for their acquiescence in British involvement. Dunsterville wanted to depart on 30 May but was delayed by the War Office until 1 June and allowed to move on, provided that the road was adequately guarded. Ottoman forces were 200 mi (320 km) west of the road at Tabriz and the Jangalis held the road at Manjil. Just after the fourth party of Dunsterforce had arrived, Dunsterville sent parties of his Officers and NCOs with pack-wireless stations, to Zenjan and Bijar, about 100 mi (160 km) north-west of Kazvin and Hamadan. Their objective was to recruit local Kurds, to bar the two tracks through Kurdistan against an Ottoman advance. Sehneh, on a southern track from Urmia to Kermanshah, was left until July, when Marshall sent troops to occupy the town.

== Operations ==
=== Dunsterforce ===
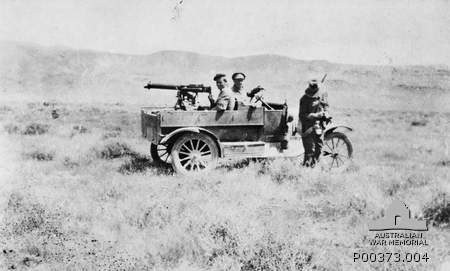
Example of a Ford van (An Australian light car patrol)

The Dunsterforce parties moved off via Zenjan, with their destinations secret until they were on their way, just after the fourth group of Dunsterforce arrived. Soon after the party for Zenjan arrived it was sent on another 70 mi (110 km) to Mianeh about 100 mi (160 km) from Tabriz and the Bijar party pressed on, using a track last reported on by British intelligence in 1842, arriving on 18 June. The Ottoman advance further north on Baku, was opposed by about 11,000 Armenian and Bolshevik troops with about 100 machine-guns and 33 artillery pieces. Dunsterville proposed to reconnoitre, regardless of the reluctance of the Russian Bolshevik government to allow British interference. On 12 June, the Bicherakov Cossacks advanced from Kazvin and defeated the Jangai at Manjil Bridge, reaching Bandar-e Anzali a few days later. Bicherakov took ship for Baku, styled himself a Bolshevik, was appointed commander of the Red Army in Caucasus, then returned to Bandar-e Anzali. In June, the Malleson mission, an Indian Army force under General Wilfrid Malleson, established a base to the east of Bandar e-Anzali in Mashhad, to counter German and Ottoman encroachments in Transcaspia (now Turkmenistan).

Dunsterville was in contact with the Armenian National Council in Baku and urged Marshall in Mesopotamia to send infantry and artillery but Marshall refused and in June sent only the 1,000 infantry already promised, two companies each of the 1st/4th Hampshire and 1st/2nd Gurkhas, two mountain guns of the 21st Battery and supplies in the 500 Ford vans; the troops took over guarding the road up to Resht. The War Office and the War Cabinet questioned Marshall's judgement and asked Dunsterville directly, what it would take to control the Caspian Sea and destroy the oilfields. Dunsterville urged a forward policy but not the sabotage of the oil as this was inimical to the interests of the populations he was trying to recruit against the Ottomans. Marshall then offered the 39th Infantry Brigade of the 13th (Western) Division and artillery, provided that it could be supplied locally. (The brigade was detached on 1 July and set off in stages from 10 July – 19 August, the Brigade HQ arriving five days later.) Along with training and leadership, Dunsterforce was to occupy the Baku oil fields, to deny oil and the local cotton crop to the Germans and Ottomans. Dunsterforce was to operate against the Ottomans in the west and hold a line from Batum to Tiflis, Baku and Krasnovodsk (on the opposite side of the Caspian Sea) to Afghanistan.

Bicherakov and the Cossacks left for Baku and were replaced by British troops at Bandar e-Anzali, as Dunsterville waited for news from Baku of the local factions and changes in their views about British involvement. Although Dunsterville and the British consul at Baku wanted to conciliate the Bolsheviks at Bandar e-Anzali, the War Cabinet wanted him to suppress them but communication was difficult, with the Bolsheviks in control of the transmitter at the port. On 25 July about 2,500 Jangalis attacked the British garrison of 300 troops at Resht and were repulsed; ten days later, Dunsterville gained proof of Bolshevik involvement, arrested the committee in Bandar e-Anzali, seized the wireless and installed Australian signallers. At Baku the situation had changed when the Ottoman advance on the oilfields began. Bicherakov and the Cossacks, with help from four Dunsterforce armoured cars, tried to stop the advance but the local troops ran away. Also on 25 July, Bicherakoff and a few British officers with the four Dunsterforce armoured cars, staged another coup d'état in Baku. A Centrocaspian Dictatorship was installed, Bicherakoff appealed for British aid and sent ships to Bandar-e Anzali to pick up the first troops. Dunsterville sent his intelligence officer, Lieutenant-Colonel C. B. Stokes and all the 44 troops available to Baku, with news that the brigade and artillery he had requested were on the way.

=== Urmia Crisis ===
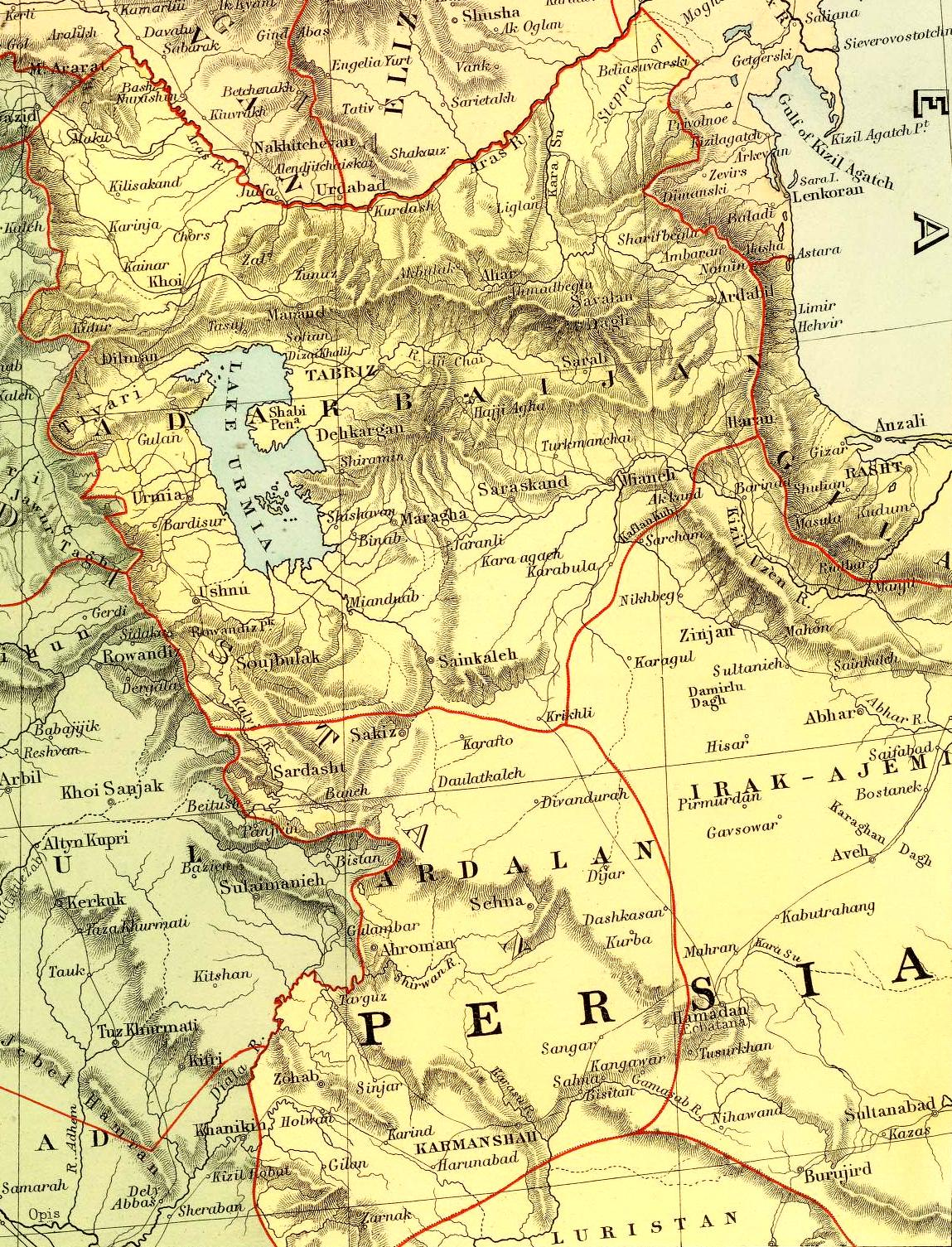
Lake Urmia, showing roads and political boundaries, 1901

In 1918, Urmia was defended by 25,000 local Christian (Nestorian) Assyrians of the Urmia villages that had withstood a siege by local Muslim rivals, until the Russian army reached Urmia in May 1915. About 35,000 more Assyrians from the Hakkiari Mountains south of Lake Van, declared war on the Ottomans in 1915 and then retreated towards the Russians, when they were unable to break through. These refugees settled at Salmas, north of Urmia and attacked the local population, who began to call them Jelus. After the Russian armies collapsed, the Ottomans drove another 20,000 Armenians from around Lake Van, who joined the earlier fugitives. Tsarist officers reorganised the two groups defending Salmas until June, when they retreated to the group at Urmia. A British officer had been sent from Tiflis with offers of organisation and help but the assurances were not honoured, which reduced British prestige. A local teacher-turned-general, Agha Petros, managed to unite the three factions and repulse fourteen Ottoman attacks.

On 8 July, before Dunsterforce set off for Baku, Lieutenant K. M. Pennington flew to the Jelus at Urmia, who were under siege by the 5th Ottoman Division and the 6th Ottoman Division of the Ottoman army. Dunsterville offered to send money, machine-guns and ammunition north from Bijar, if Petross pushed a force through the Ottoman siege lines around Lake Urmia, to meet the column and escort it in. The column departed from Bijar on 19 July, commanded by Major J. C. More, carrying £45,000 in Iranian silver Dinar, twelve Lewis guns and 100,000 rounds of ammunition, accompanied by Captain Stanley Savige, five Dunsterforce officers and fifteen NCOs, escorted by a squadron of the 14th (King's) Hussars (Colonel Bridges). The British reached the rendezvous at Sain Kala on 23 July as arranged but there was no reception party waiting. After a couple of days, Bridges decided that he must return before the grain supply for the horses ran out.

Savige and the Dunsterforce party got permission to go on alone, when the column had retired 50 mi (80 km) to Takan Tepe, where his party and the convoy was allowed to remain, with a squadron of cavalry. Savige judged that the Assyrians could still reach them and in the meantime, they would raise a local force to get to Urmia if necessary. Recruitment began and on 1 August, news arrived of a battle south of Lake Urmia that Savige took to be the Assyrian break out attempt and the party moved north the next day. Aga Petros and the Assyrians arrived on 3 August and next day the march to Urmia began; at dusk near Sain Kala, Petros was aghast to see Assyrian women on the road. The Ottomans had captured Urmia in his absence and the 80,000 population had fled. On 5 August, the British saw a multitude on the road from Urmia, who said that the far end was some miles back, with a rear-guard commanded by Dr William Shedd an American missionary, trying to protect the refugees from local Kurdish and Iranian attacks. The Dunsterforce party went to join the rearguard, while the cavalry protected the main body. A hundred men promised by Petros had already gone to find their families, when the rearguard moved at dawn on 6 August.

The Savige party (two officers and six NCOs), found the tail of the refugee column 15 mi (24 km) up the road, with Mrs Shedd encouraging wounded refugees to keep going and the Doctor and 24 armed men on a ridge, waiting for the next attack. Savige took over the refugee guard and pressed on for about 6 mi (9.7 km) to a village that was being looted by local mounted irregulars. Savige and his exiguous force forced the horsemen out of the village and held them off until later the next day and then retreated, finding that the Assyrians had pillaged the villages in the past, as ruthlessly as the survivors had been taking reprisals against them as they fled from Urmia. Soon after dawn the next day, 150 horse advanced down the road and others moved past on the flanks. Savige and the party hurried back to a ridge behind a village and commenced a rear-guard action with some of the refugees, while the others ran away. Many well-armed Assyrians pushed to the head of the column, seizing the best horses and leaving women and children to the bandits; having fought in the defence of Urmia, Petros lost control of them once they were under British protection. During the first day, Savige and a local leader got several Assyrians (at gunpoint) to charge the pursuers, as a message was got back to the Hussars asking for support.

After seven hours of fighting, having been pressed back to the tail of the column, twelve British cavalry appeared on the next ridge back, having heard of the request for help and arriving just in time, as the rearguard was exhausted. The cavalry held off the attackers and then fifty men sent by Agha Petros arrived and relieved Savige and the Dunsterforce party. Dr Shedd reached the British encampment but during the night died of cholera and was buried nearby. Attacks on the refugee column by Ottoman troops and local Kurds diminished but for the rest of the march there were frequent attempts to take loot and rustle cattle before the escort could intervene. The cavalry guarded the money and the Dunsterville party provided the rearguard but was not able to protect wounded or exhausted women and children, who had been abandoned by their men, from being murdered. Short of Bijar, an attack by 400 local hillmen was deterred, by a show of force by Agha Petros and on 17 August, the rearguard entered Bijar, by when the Dunsterforce members were so worn out that only four regained their fitness before the end of the war. Of about 80,000 Assyrians who fled from Urmia, perhaps 50,000 reached the Persian road.

==== Urmia Brigade ====
At Bijar, Lieutenant-Colonel McCarthy tried with Agha Petros to recruit from the Assyrians a force to recapture Urmia but found that the best men were leading the retreat and would not stop. McCarthy returned to Hamadan ready to stop them with machine-guns if necessary and the best men were press-ganged at bayonet-point by a platoon of the 1st/4th Hampshire. The "recruits" were formed at Abshineh, into the Urmia Brigade (Major George Henderson) of 2,000 cavalry and 3,000 infantry, trained and commanded through a small Dunsterforce detachment. The remaining Assyrians were sent on to a refugee camp at Baqubah near Baghdad and the Dunsterforce personnel attempted to prevent the Assyrians from getting into Baghdad and plundering local Iranians. The Dunsterforce officers and NCOs were unscrupulous, using training methods like "young sheepdogs practising on the fowls" but had made little progress, when two of the new battalions were sent to counter the threat of an Ottoman advance towards the Persian road; the third battalion moved to Bijar in October. (Eventually the Urmia Brigade returned to Mesopotamia to prepare to recapture Urmia, when the armistice made the attempt unnecessary and the brigade disbanded)

=== Baku ===
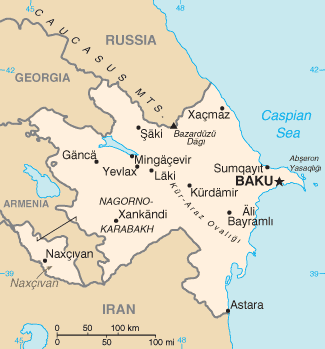
Modern map of Azerbaijan

Baku was attacked on 29 July and again the local troops ran away, leaving the Bicherakov Cossacks in the lurch. On 31 July, the Ottomans attacked Hill 905 north-west of Baku at 3:30 a.m. and continued until 2 August. The 10th Caucasian Infantry Division, the 51st Infantry Division, several batteries of artillery and a cavalry regiment arrived but another attack on 5 August failed, with 547 Ottoman casualties. The 10th Caucasian Infantry Division was withdrawn to rest and the 15th Infantry Division took over. When the Ottomans were about 3,000 yd (1.7 mi; 2.7 km) from the docks, Bicherakov decided to retreat to Derbent, 150 mi (240 km) up the coast but the Ottomans were unaccountably seized by panic and retreated, which encouraged the Armenians to counter-attack, until the Ottomans rallied about 5 mi (8.0 km) outside town. Dunsterville also obtained the steamships HMS Kruger (President Kruger), Kursk and Argo, to be held ready for a hurried retreat. Fears about the British line of communications were reduced, when the Jangali leader Kuchik Khan made terms on 12 August, which included supplying the British forces.

Every spare man of Dunsterforce began the task of training the Armenian and Russian troops at Baku into an army. There were 6,000–10,000 men in 23 battalions that were commanded by five political organisations. The troops held a defensive perimeter across the Baku peninsula about 18 mi (29 km) long, the last 8 mi (13 km) in the south running along cliffs and the rest on low ground including a salt lake. From the salt lake to the cliffs lies a hill known as Mud Volcano, that was the most important defensive feature on the right flank. On 18 August, Dunsterville and two more battalions reached Baku but at the end of the month, troops intended for Baku had to be diverted to Bijar, against another Ottoman attack from Tabriz, which threatened to cut the lines of communication to Bandar-e Anzali. As parties of the 39th Infantry Brigade arrived at Baku, they took over parts of the defence, particularly at Mud Volcano and the left flank. Even when the rest of Dunsterforce had arrived from Mesopotamia in the Ford vans and joined in the defence of the city, there were only just over 1,000 infantry and one artillery battery, against about 14,000 Ottomans, who had already captured villages behind the right flank.

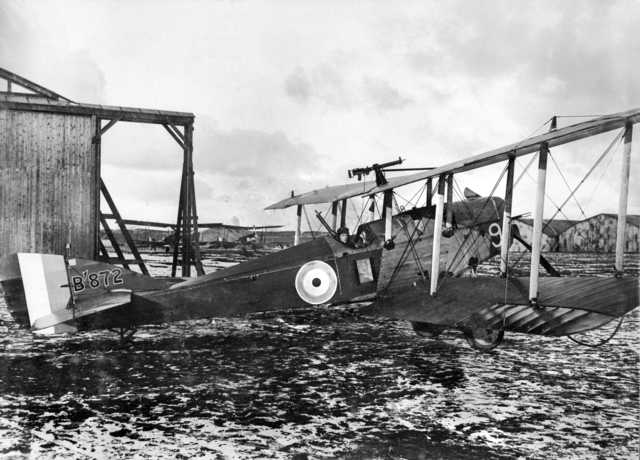
Martinsyde Elephant photographed in England, 1917

Without the support of local troops, Dunsterforce could not defend Baku and so the locals were reorganised into brigades of three Baku battalions, each with Dunsterforce advisers and one British battalion. Dunsterville had ordered two Martinsyde Elephants of 72 Squadron RAF to Baku, to encourage the population and on 18 August, the aeroplanes flew from Kazvin to Bandar-e Anzali. The aircraft flew on to Baku and by 20 August, the Martinsydes were ready for operations.

The Armenians attempted bravado but during Ottoman attacks, tended to hang back or melt away; a Bolshevik crew of a ship reported to Dunsterville that,

We have witnessed with intense admiration the heroic conduct of your brave British soldiers in the defence of Baku. We have seen them suffering wounds and death bravely in defence of our town, which our own people were too feeble to defend.

— Charles Bean

On 26 August, the Ottomans captured Mud Volcano and inflicted many casualties on the British battalion. The British repulsed the Ottomans four times but the local troops melted away; a Canadian captain commanding an Armenian battalion suddenly found himself alone and the fifth attack succeeded.

In another attack on 31 August, a Russian battalion joined in and assisted the British during a retirement but Dunsterville threatened the Baku authorities, that he would order more withdrawals of British troops, rather than leave them to be killed. Next day he told the Dictators that he would evacuate Baku that night, at which the Dictators replied that the British could only go after women and children had left and at the same time as the local troops; Russian gunboats were ordered to fire on the British if their ships tried to leave. Dunsterville took no notice but had second thoughts and the situation improved, when Bicherakov sent 500 Russian reinforcements, with a promise of 5,000 more in two weeks. Another Russian controlled settlement was at Lankaran 130 mi (210 km) south of Baku, where Dunsterville had sent Lieutenant-Colonel A. Rawlinson and some Dunsterforce personnel, to raise a force of 4,000 men, for raids on Ottoman communications.

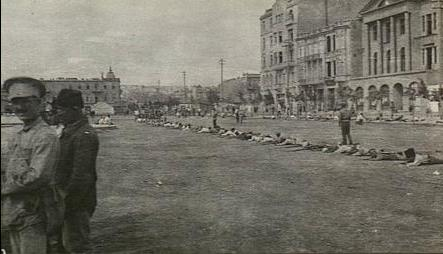
Dunsterforce train troops of the Baku Army

In early September, an evacuation was considered and the War Office agreed with Marshall, that British troops should be withdrawn. The Ottoman success had been costly and it was only after the arrival of reinforcements that the attack could be resumed on 14 September, a plan disclosed to the defenders by a deserter on 12 September. The Ottoman plan for the final assault on Baku, was for the 15th Infantry Division to attack from the north and the 5th Caucasian Infantry Division to attack from the west, with the main attack on the north-west corner of the Baku defence line. The attack began at 1:00 a.m., along a road through Wolf's Gap in the ridge. In clouds and mist, the two British pilots strafed the Ottoman troops on the western slopes from low altitude and reported the progress of the attack. By 12:15 p.m. the Ottomans were half-way from the ridge to the city and at 3:00 p.m., the pilots were ordered to destroy the aircraft, since they were too badly damaged to risk flying. The RAF contingent abandoned the airfield under artillery fire, the pilots took a machine-gun, salvaged three cameras and the ground crews took another machine-gun and joined the infantry defending the north end of the field. (Note: The survivors eventually reached Petrovsk with the Cossacks and then found their way to Bandar-e Anzali and Kazvin.)

With the Ottomans able to bombard the port and shipping with observed artillery-fire, Marshall ordered Dunsterforce to leave. Ships had been readied at the docks and evacuation took place on the night of 14/15 September in two ships. The Dictators changed their minds but behind a rearguard of the 7th North Staffordshire, the men guns and equipment were loaded. A crewmember managed to turn on the lights of Dunsterville's ship, that was fired on by the port guardship and hit the Armenian six times (the Dunsterforce passengers holding up the crew at gunpoint) as the ships ran for Bandar e-Anzali and arrived with no more casualties. Two Australians who were stranded managed to leave on a refugee ship to Krasnovodsk. With the withdrawal of the British, order broke down among the civilian Azeris, Cossacks and Armenian refugees and as the remaining defences were overrun, fires, pillaging and atrocities began. The Ottoman bombardment continued through the night and by dawn up to 6,000 Armenians, many of them civilians, had been killed in reprisal by Azeri irregulars; there had been about 1,000 Ottoman casualties. The retreat from Baku left the Dunsterforce troops and Australian wireless operators in Lankaran isolated among an aggrieved public and the force had to repel an attack by Tartar irregulars, before running for Bandar e-Anzali in a stolen lorry on 18 October.

==== Tabriz ====
The main Ottoman effort at Baku was assisted by operations on the southern flank, where the 9th Army began an invasion of Iran with six divisions, to capture Tabriz. In late June 1918, two divisions had to be withdrawn but the 12th Division attacked southwards and captured Dilman on 18 June; by 27 July the division had reached Urmia. In late August the advance passed beyond Lake Urmia and to the north, two more Ottoman divisions by-passed Yerevan and went straight toward Nahcivan, which was captured on 19 July. The 11th Division advanced along the railway and captured Tabriz on 23 August, then a force of about 2,000 men advanced on 5 September and drove back Dunsterforce outposts beyond Mianeh and occupied the town, then pressed on to the Persian road near Kazvin. The 39th Infantry Brigade elements diverted from Dunsterforce at Baku to Bijar in August, were organised into Sweet's Column (Lieutenant-Colonel E. H. Sweet) and set off from Hamadan to Zenjan on 14 September, accompanied by an Australian wireless team. The British reinforcements were able to prevent the 9th Army from advancing further and in September, the Ottomans consolidated a line in northern Iran, from Astara on the Caspian Sea south of Baku, to Mianeh in Iran about 37 mi (60 km) to the south-east of Tabriz, thence to Sulaymaniyah in Kurdistan.

== Aftermath ==
=== Analysis ===
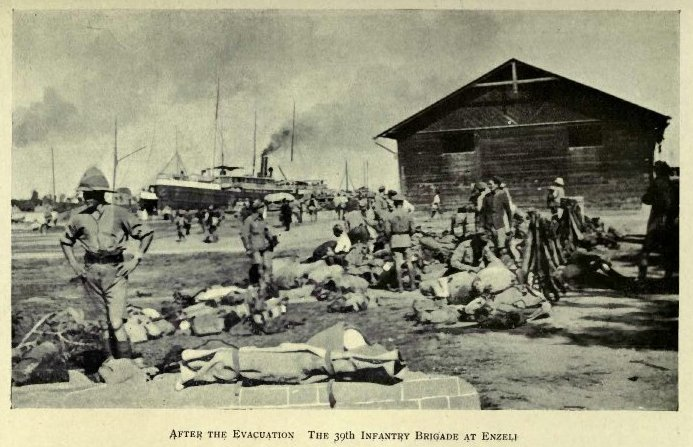
Soldiers of the 39th Brigade at Bandar-e Anzali, after being evacuated from Baku.

The Centrocaspian Dictatorship fell on 15 September, after Ottoman-Azerbaijani forces occupied Baku. In 1937, the RAF official historian, H. A. Jones wrote that Dunsterforce had failed to reach Tiflis or to create a Caucasian military force to hold the line between Batum, Tiflis and Baku but the cotton crop and the oil of Baku had been denied to the Germans. The Ottomans took over the oil fields in September, though only for a few weeks. On 30 October, the armistice with the Ottoman Empire required them to leave and allow the Allies to re-occupy Baku. Exaggerated rumours about the strength of Dunsterforce had also tied down Ottoman troops in Kurdistan, protecting the British flank in Mesopotamia.

In the same year, Charles Bean, the Australian official historian, wrote that after Dunsterforce was disbanded, the officers were allowed to return to their former units, join Indian battalions or stay with Norperforce. The Dunsterville Mission had failed in its original purpose but managed to stop the agents of the Central powers getting into Iran. The obstruction of the Jungle Movement of Gilan (Jangali) was achieved by Bicherakov but this would have not occurred without the rapport with him that was established by Dunsterville. The operations of Dunsterforce gave the British great local prestige as the rest of the Dunsterville Mission carried out famine relief and the organisation of supplies, for which it had little local knowledge but the force adapted and also displayed its military quality in the fighting at Sain Kala and Baku.

In 1987, Vasili Mitrokhin, a Soviet archivist, wrote that the real objective of Dunsterforce, in the guise of defending British India, was to secure a foothold in the Caucasus. The force would then co-operate with counter-revolutionary forces, to overthrow the Baku Soviet and seize control of Caucasus and the Caspian Sea region. Mitrokhin claimed that General Dunsterville had "forty Ford Model T vans loaded with gold and silver" to pay for the operation.

=== Casualties ===
One Canadian member of Dunsterforce was wounded. Ottoman forces in Iran in 1918 lost about 500 men killed and 1,000 wounded and in Armenia and Azerbaijan lost about 1,500 men killed and 3,000 wounded.

=== Subsequent operations ===
After the Allied victory at the Battle of Dobro Pole near Salonika (15–18 September) and the British victory at the Battle of Megiddo (19–25 September), the army in Caucasus was the only source for Ottoman reinforcements and had to give up more and more divisions, that eventually ended offensive operations in the theatre. After resting, the Ottoman army in Caucasus advanced with the 15th Division northwards along the Caspian coast to Derbent but were held up on 7 October by troops supported by naval gunfire from the Bolshevik fleet. The Ottomans attacked again from 20–26 October and the 15th Division reached Petrovsk on 28 October. After several attacks the city fell on 8 November, in the last Ottoman offensive operation of the war and marked the northern limit of the Ottoman advance into the Caucasus Mountains.

On 17 September, Dunsterforce had been disbanded and North Persia Force (Major-General W. M. Thomson) took over the command of the troops in the area. The Dunsterforce officers were allowed to choose to return to their regiments, join Indian battalions or stay on in Norperforce. Marshall was told by the War Office on 2 October, that an Ottoman request for an armistice was anticipated and he was to take as much ground as possible up the Tigris, to assist the British in Syria to advance on Aleppo. Marshall planned a 350 mi (560 km) advance up the Tigris, despite most of the transport being in Iran, making an advance to Aleppo out of the question. The advance began after the Ottoman armistice request and the Ottoman troops began a withdrawal on 24 October, until the Tigris Group (Dicle Grubu) of the 6th Army was surrounded and forced to surrender on 29 October, at the Battle of Sharqat (23–30 October).

A flying column pushed on but was met south of Mosul by an Ottoman delegation on 1 November, with the news that the armistice had come into force the day before and the town was occupied on 10 November. Far to the north, the North Persia Force and the Bicherakov Cossacks re-entered Baku on 17 November. The Bolshevik regime eventually defeated its enemies in Central Asia in 1921 but local operations continued against Basmachi irregulars for years afterwards. British intervention had been part of a wider attempt by the British, French, Americans and Japanese to prevent military bases and Allied war material at ports falling into the hands of the Central Powers. At first the Allies were encouraged by the Bolshevik regime but in the summer of 1918, the Allies began intriguing with the internal enemies of the Bolsheviks, which soured relations with the USSR for decades.

== Order of battle ==
Dunsterforce (Note: Details from Moberly (1987) unless specified.)

- Western Front
  - Quotas of picked officers and NCOs from the British Expeditionary Force, Canadian Corps, Australian Imperial Force, New Zealand Expeditionary Force and the South African Overseas Expeditionary Force.
- Mediterranean Front
  - Quotas from British and Dominion contingents of the Mediterranean Expeditionary Force.
- 39th Infantry Brigade
  - 9th (Service) Battalion, The Royal Warwickshire Regiment
  - 7th (Service) Battalion, Gloucestershire Regiment
  - 9th (Service) Battalion, The Worcestershire Regiment
  - 7th (Service) Battalion, The North Staffordshire Regiment
  - 1st/4th Battalion, The Hampshire Regiment (platoon)
  - 39th Machine Gun Company, Machine Gun Corps (MGC)
  - 39th Supply & Transport Column, Army Service Corps (ASC)
  - 39th Trench Mortar Battery

== See also ==
- 26 Baku Commissars
- Malleson mission
- Republic of Azerbaijan
