= Jam Jerd =

Village in Qazvin province, Iran

Jam Jerd Persian: جم جرد
- Village
- Location within Iran
- Coordinates: 36°18′48″N 49°41′46″E
- Country: Iran
- Province: Qazvin
- County: Qazvin
- District: Kuhin
- Rural District: Ilat-e Qaqazan-e Gharbi

Population (2016)
  - Total: 377
- Time zone: UTC+3:30 (IRST)

Jam Jerd (Persian: جم جرد) (Note: Also known as Dzhamdzhird, Jam Jūd, and Jamjird; Azerbaijani: Cəmcird) is a village in Ilat-e Qaqazan-e Gharbi Rural District of Kuhin District in Qazvin County, Qazvin province, Iran.

== Demographics ==
=== Ethnicity ===
The village is populated by Azerbaijani Turks.

=== Population ===
At the time of the 2006 National Census, the village's population was 492 in 103 households. The following census in 2011 counted 468 people in 106 households. The 2016 census measured the population of the village as 377 people in 124 households.
