= Bahramabad-e Qaqazan =

Village in Qazvin province, Iran

Bahramabad-e Qaqazan Persian: بهرام‌آباد قاقازان
- Village
- Location within Iran
- Coordinates: 36°19′07″N 49°39′46″E
- Country: Iran
- Province: Qazvin
- County: Qazvin
- District: Kuhin
- Rural District: Ilat-e Qaqazan-e Gharbi

Population (2016)
  - Total: 537
- Time zone: UTC+3:30 (IRST)

Bahramabad-e Qaqazan (Persian: بهرام‌آباد قاقازان) (Note: Also romanized as Bahrāmābād-e Qāqāzān) is a village in Ilat-e Qaqazan-e Gharbi Rural District of Kuhin District in Qazvin County, Qazvin province, Iran.

== Demographics ==
=== Population ===
At the time of the 2006 National Census, the village's population was 640 in 128 households. The following census in 2011 counted 568 people in 142 households. The 2016 census measured the population of the village as 537 people in 160 households.
