= Shenazand =

Village in Qazvin province, Iran

Shenazand Persian: شنازند
- Village
- Location within Iran
- Coordinates: 36°17′58″N 49°45′30″E
- Country: Iran
- Province: Qazvin
- County: Qazvin
- District: Kuhin
- Rural District: Ilat-e Qaqazan-e Sharqi

Population (2016)
  - Total: 589
- Time zone: UTC+3:30 (IRST)

Shenazand (Persian: شنازند) (Note: Also romanized as Shanāzand and Shenāzand; also known as Chenāzand and Chīnīzand) is a village in Ilat-e Qaqazan-e Sharqi Rural District of Kuhin District in Qazvin County, Qazvin province, Iran.

== Demographics ==
=== Population ===
At the time of the 2006 National Census, the village's population was 531 in 122 households. The following census in 2011 counted 572 people in 176 households. The 2016 census measured the population of the village as 589 people in 175 households.
