= Yaleh Gonbad =

Village in Qazvin province, Iran

Yaleh Gonbad Persian: يله گنبد
- Village
- Location within Iran
- Coordinates: 36°25′15″N 49°41′57″E
- Country: Iran
- Province: Qazvin
- County: Qazvin
- District: Kuhin
- Rural District: Ilat-e Qaqazan-e Gharbi

Population (2016)
  - Total: 208
- Time zone: UTC+3:30 (IRST)

Yaleh Gonbad (Persian: يله گنبد) (Note: Also known as Emāmzādeh, Imamzade-Ele-Geumbez, and Imāmzādeh) is a village in Ilat-e Qaqazan-e Gharbi Rural District of Kuhin District in Qazvin County, Qazvin province, Iran.

== Demographics ==
=== Population ===
At the time of the 2006 National Census, the village's population was 429 in 105 households. The following census in 2011 counted 313 people in 92 households. The 2016 census measured the population of the village as 208 people in 88 households.
