= Arasht =

Arasht or Arisht or Arshet or Arshit or Aresht (Persian: ارشت) may refer to:

- Arasht, Qazvin
- Arasht, Zanjan
