= Dudah Chay =

Village in Qazvin province, Iran

Dudah Chay Persian: دوده چای
- Village
- Location within Iran
- Coordinates: 36°21′21″N 49°41′44″E
- Country: Iran
- Province: Qazvin
- County: Qazvin
- District: Kuhin
- Rural District: Ilat-e Qaqazan-e Gharbi

Population (2016)
  - Total: 573
- Time zone: UTC+3:30 (IRST)

Dudah Chay (Persian: دوده چای) (Note: Also romanized as Dūdah Chāy; also known as Deheh Chāy) is a village in Ilat-e Qaqazan-e Gharbi Rural District of Kuhin District in Qazvin County, Qazvin province, Iran.

== Demographics ==
=== Population ===
At the time of the 2006 National Census, the village's population was 506 in 119 households. The following census in 2011 counted 341 people in 91 households. The 2016 census measured the population of the village as 573 people in 173 households.
