= Yalabad =

Yalabad or Yelabad (Persian: يل اباد) may refer to:

- Yalabad, Markazi
- Yalabad, Qazvin
