= Aqa Baba, Qazvin =

Village in Qazvin province, Iran

Aqa Baba Persian: اقابابا
- Village
- Location within Iran
- Coordinates: 36°20′24″N 49°45′52″E
- Country: Iran
- Province: Qazvin
- County: Qazvin
- District: Kuhin
- Rural District: Ilat-e Qaqazan-e Sharqi

Population (2016)
  - Total: 2,343
- Time zone: UTC+3:30 (IRST)

Aqa Baba (Persian: اقابابا) (Note: Also romanized as Āqā Bābā; also known as Aga-Baba and Āgha Bāba) is a village in, and the capital of, Ilat-e Qaqazan-e Sharqi Rural District in Kuhin District of Qazvin County, Qazvin province, Iran.

== Demographics ==
=== Population ===
At the time of the 2006 National Census, the village's population was 2,373 in 558 households. The following census in 2011 counted 2,251 people in 605 households. The 2016 census measured the population of the village as 2,343 people in 673 households. It was the most populous village in its rural district.
