= Hoseynabad, Kuhin =

Village in Qazvin province, Iran

Hoseynabad Persian: حسین آباد
- Village
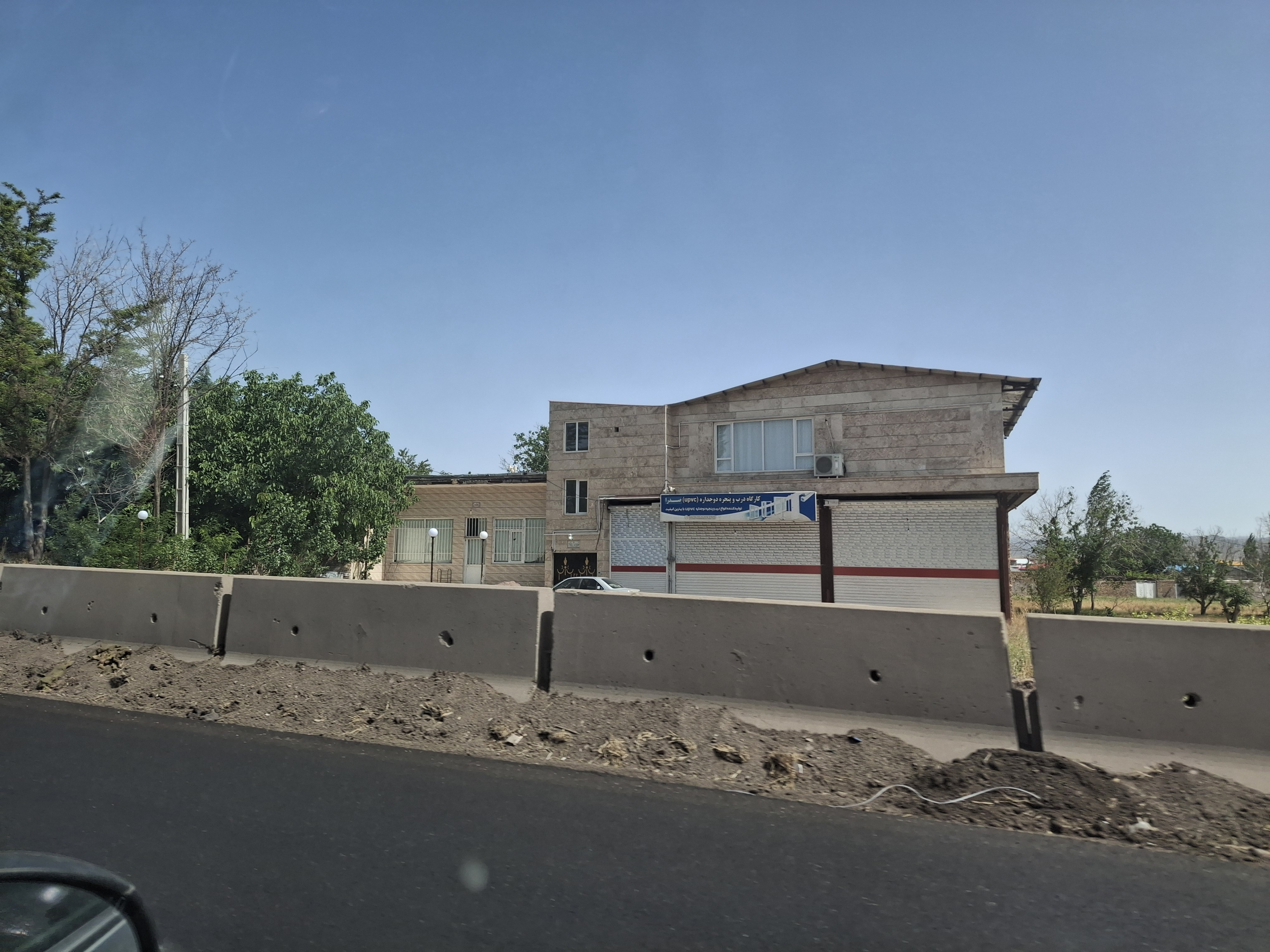

- Location within Iran
- Coordinates: 36°18′48″N 49°48′44″E
- Country: Iran
- Province: Qazvin
- County: Qazvin
- District: Kuhin
- Rural District: Ilat-e Qaqazan-e Sharqi

Population (2016)
  - Total: 900
- Time zone: UTC+3:30 (IRST)

Hoseynabad (Persian: حسین آباد) (Note: Also romanized as Ḩoseynābād; also known as Ḩoseynābād-e Bozorg, Husainābād, and Khusainabad; Azerbaijani: Hüseynabad) is a village in Ilat-e Qaqazan-e Sharqi Rural District of Kuhin District in Qazvin County, Qazvin province, Iran.

== Demographics ==
=== Ethnicity ===
The village is populated by Azerbaijani Turks.

=== Population ===
At the time of the 2006 National Census, the village's population was 944 in 241 households. The following census in 2011 counted 965 people in 268 households. The 2016 census measured the population of the village as 900 people in 265 households.
