= Bichang =

Bichang may refer to:

- Bichang (Qing dynasty official)
- Zhou Bichang (born 1985), Chinese singer-songwriter
- Buchinak-e Jadid, a village in Iran
