= Tazarkosh =

Village in Qazvin province, Iran

Tazarkosh Persian: طزركش
- Village
- Location within Iran
- Coordinates: 36°23′54″N 49°38′31″E
- Country: Iran
- Province: Qazvin
- County: Qazvin
- District: Kuhin
- Rural District: Ilat-e Qaqazan-e Gharbi

Population (2016)
  - Total: 269
- Time zone: UTC+3:30 (IRST)

Tazarkosh (Persian: طزركش) (Note: Also romanized as Ţazar Kosh and Ţazarkash; also known as Ţaraz Kash, Ţarzkash, Tarzkosh, Ţazar Gash, and Tezīrkān) is a village in Ilat-e Qaqazan-e Gharbi Rural District of Kuhin District in Qazvin County, Qazvin province, Iran.

== Demographics ==
=== Population ===
At the time of the 2006 National Census, the village's population was 311 in 80 households. The following census in 2011 counted 311 people in 86 households. The 2016 census measured the population of the village as 269 people in 87 households.
