= Kushkak, Qazvin =

Village in Qazvin province, Iran

Kushkak Persian: کوشکک
- Village
- Location within Iran
- Country: Iran
- Province: Qazvin
- County: Qazvin
- District: Kuhin
- Rural District: Ilat-e Qaqazan-e Sharqi

Population (2016)
  - Total: 406
- Time zone: UTC+3:30 (IRST)

Kushkak (Persian: کوشکک) (Note: Also romanized as Kūshkak) is a village in Ilat-e Qaqazan-e Sharqi Rural District of Kuhin District in Qazvin County, Qazvin province, Iran.

== Demographics ==
=== Population ===
At the time of the 2006 National Census, the village's population was 417 in 89 households. The following census in 2011 counted 424 people in 105 households. The 2016 census measured the population of the village as 406 people in 120 households.
