= Kharaqan-e Sofla =

Kharaqan-e Sofla خرقان سفلي
- Village
- Location within Iran
- Coordinates: 36°31′29″N 49°44′23″E
- Country: Iran
- Province: Qazvin
- County: Qazvin
- Bakhsh: Kuhin
- Rural District: Ilat-e Qaqazan-e Sharqi

Population (2006)
  - Total: 67
- Time zone: UTC+3:30 (IRST)
  - Summer (DST): UTC+4:30 (IRDT)

Kharaqan-e Sofla (Persian: خرقان سفلي, also Romanized as Kharaqān-e Soflá; also known as Kharakān-e Soflá, Kharakān-e Pā’īn, Kharagan, Kharakān, and Kharkan) is a village in Ilat-e Qaqazan-e Sharqi Rural District, Kuhin District, Qazvin County, Qazvin Province, Iran. At the 2006 census, its population was 67, in 20 families.
