= Buynak =

Buynak may refer to:

- Gordon Buynak, American ice hockey player
- Buinak, a village in Iran
