= Hesamabad, Qazvin =

Village in Qazvin province, Iran

Hesamabad Persian: حسام آباد
- Village
- Location within Iran
- Coordinates: 36°24′10″N 49°37′05″E
- Country: Iran
- Province: Qazvin
- County: Qazvin
- District: Kuhin
- Rural District: Ilat-e Qaqazan-e Gharbi

Population (2016)
  - Total: 267
- Time zone: UTC+3:30 (IRST)

Hesamabad (Persian: حسام آباد) (Note: Also romanized as Ḩesāmābād) is a village in Ilat-e Qaqazan-e Gharbi Rural District of Kuhin District in Qazvin County, Qazvin province, Iran.

== Demographics ==
=== Population ===
At the time of the 2006 National Census, the village's population was 96 in 31 households. The following census in 2011 counted 99 people in 33 households. The 2016 census measured the population of the village as 267 people in 96 households.
