= Feter =

Feter may refer to:

- Jakub Feter, Polish footballer
- Fetr, a village in Iran
