= Astin Dar-e Olya =

Astin Dar-e Olya استين درعليا
- Village
- Location within Iran
- Coordinates: 36°27′50″N 49°40′30″E
- Country: Iran
- Province: Qazvin
- County: Qazvin
- Bakhsh: Kuhin
- Rural District: Ilat-e Qaqazan-e Gharbi

Population (2006)
  - Total: 23
- Time zone: UTC+3:30 (IRST)
  - Summer (DST): UTC+4:30 (IRDT)

Astin Dar-e Olya (Persian: استين درعليا, also Romanized as Āstīn Dar-e ‘Olyā; also known as Āstīn Dar-e Bālā) is a village in Ilat-e Qaqazan-e Gharbi Rural District, Kuhin District, Qazvin County, Qazvin Province, Iran. At the 2006 census, its population was 23, in 8 families.
