= Bek Baghi =

Bek Baghi بك باغي
- Village
- Location within Iran
- Coordinates: 36°27′05″N 49°30′21″E
- Country: Iran
- Province: Qazvin
- County: Qazvin
- Bakhsh: Kuhin
- Rural District: Ilat-e Qaqazan-e Gharbi

Population (2006)
  - Total: 48
- Time zone: UTC+3:30 (IRST)
  - Summer (DST): UTC+4:30 (IRDT)

Bek Baghi (Persian: بك باغي, also Romanized as Bek Bāghī; also known as Beg Bāghī, Beg Bāghi, Beg-Vagi, and Beyg Bāghī) is a village in Ilat-e Qaqazan-e Gharbi Rural District, Kuhin District, Qazvin County, Qazvin Province, Iran. At the 2006 census, its population was 48, in 15 families.
