= Senjanak, Qazvin =

Village in Qazvin province, Iran

Senjanak Persian: سنجانک
- Village
- Location within Iran
- Coordinates: 36°16′59″N 49°44′50″E
- Country: Iran
- Province: Qazvin
- County: Qazvin
- District: Kuhin
- Rural District: Ilat-e Qaqazan-e Sharqi

Population (2016)
  - Total: 607
- Time zone: UTC+3:30 (IRST)

Senjanak (Persian: سنجانک) (Note: Also romanized as Senjānak; also known as Senjāk, Sindzhanak, and Sinjānak) is a village in Ilat-e Qaqazan-e Sharqi Rural District of Kuhin District in Qazvin County, Qazvin province, Iran.

== Demographics ==
=== Population ===
At the time of the 2006 National Census, the village's population was 511 in 82 households. The following census in 2011 counted 481 people in 125 households. The 2016 census measured the population of the village as 607 people in 178 households.
