= Kuhin =

City in Qazvin province, Iran

Kuhin Persian: كوهين
- City
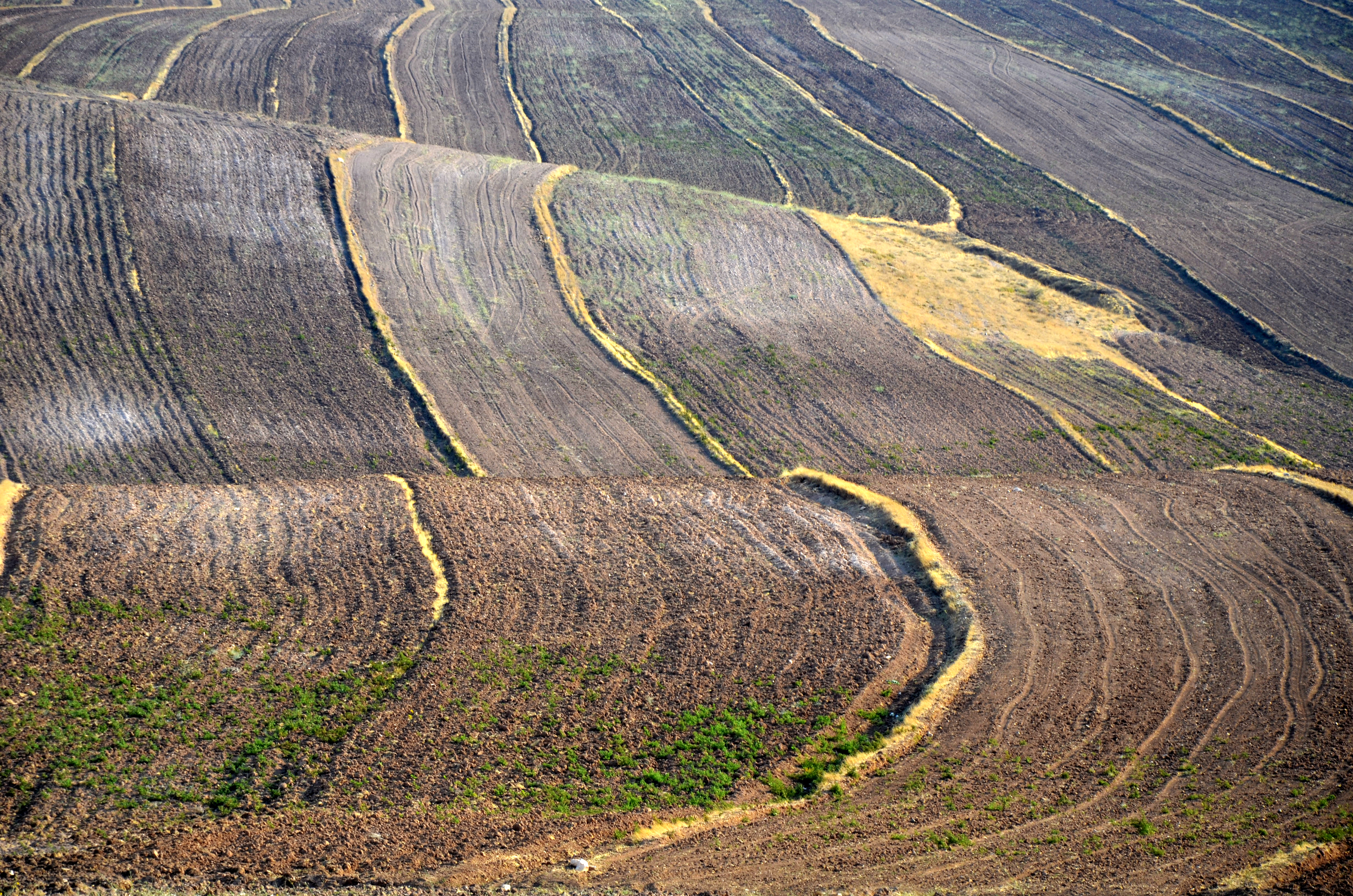

- Location within Iran
- Coordinates: 36°22′18″N 49°39′46″E
- Country: Iran
- Province: Qazvin
- County: Qazvin
- District: Kuhin
- Established as a city: 2002

Population (2016)
  - Total: 1,411
- Time zone: UTC+3:30 (IRST)

Kuhin (Persian: كوهين) (Note: Also romanized as Kūhīn) is a city in, and the capital of, Kuhin District in Qazvin County, Qazvin province, Iran. It also serves as the administrative center for Ilat-e Qaqazan-e Gharbi Rural District. The village of Kuhin was converted to a city in 2002.

== Demographics ==
=== Language and ethnicity ===
The people of Kuhin are Turks and speak Azerbaijani Turkish.

=== Population ===
At the time of the 2006 National Census, the city's population was 1,398 in 388 households. The following census in 2011 counted 1,622 people in 414 households. The 2016 census measured the population of the city as 1,411 people in 418 households.
