= Buinak =

Village in Qazvin province, Iran

Buinak Persian: بویینک
- Village
- Location within Iran
- Coordinates: 36°21′03″N 49°43′21″E
- Country: Iran
- Province: Qazvin
- County: Qazvin
- District: Kuhin
- Rural District: Ilat-e Qaqazan-e Sharqi

Population (2016)
  - Total: 1,067
- Time zone: UTC+3:30 (IRST)

Buinak (Persian: بویینک) (Note: Also romanized as Bū’īnak and Būynak) is a village in Ilat-e Qaqazan-e Sharqi Rural District of Kuhin District in Qazvin County, Qazvin province, Iran.

== Demographics ==
=== Population ===
At the time of the 2006 National Census, the village's population was 844 in 199 households. The following census in 2011 counted 1,108 people in 280 households. The 2016 census measured the population of the village as 1,067 people in 309 households.
