= Astin Dar-e Sofla =

Village in Qazvin province, Iran

Astin Dar-e Sofla Persian: آستین‌در سفلی
- Village
- Location within Iran
- Coordinates: 36°26′03″N 49°38′20″E
- Country: Iran
- Province: Qazvin
- County: Qazvin
- District: Kuhin
- Rural District: Ilat-e Qaqazan-e Gharbi

Population (2016)
  - Total: 206
- Time zone: UTC+3:30 (IRST)

Astin Dar-e Sofla (Persian: آستین‌در سفلی) (Note: Also romanized as Āstīn Dar-e Soflá; also known as Āstīn Dar-e Pā'īn and Āstīn Darreh) is a village in Ilat-e Qaqazan-e Gharbi Rural District of Kuhin District in Qazvin County, Qazvin province, Iran.

== Demographics ==
=== Population ===
At the time of the 2006 National Census, the village's population was 56 in 15 households. The following census in 2011 counted 39 people in 12 households. The 2016 census measured the population of the village as 206 people in 71 households.
