= Fetr =

Fetr فطر
- Village
- Location within Iran
- Coordinates: 36°31′50″N 49°54′26″E
- Country: Iran
- Province: Qazvin
- County: Qazvin
- Bakhsh: Kuhin
- Rural District: Ilat-e Qaqazan-e Sharqi

Population (2006)
  - Total: 97
- Time zone: UTC+3:30 (IRST)
  - Summer (DST): UTC+4:30 (IRDT)

Fetr (Persian: فطر, also romanized as Feţr and Feţer; also known as Patar and Pathar) is a village in Ilat-e Qaqazan-e Sharqi Rural District, Kuhin District, Qazvin County, Qazvin Province, Iran. At the 2006 census, its population was 97, in 24 families.
