= Asadabad-e Khurin =

Village in Qazvin province, Iran

Asadabad-e Khurin Persian: اسدآباد خورین
- Village
- Location within Iran
- Coordinates: 36°24′18″N 49°39′50″E
- Country: Iran
- Province: Qazvin
- County: Qazvin
- District: Kuhin
- Rural District: Ilat-e Qaqazan-e Gharbi

Population (2016)
  - Total: 203
- Time zone: UTC+3:30 (IRST)

Asadabad-e Khurin (Persian: اسدآباد خورین) (Note: Also romanized as Asadābād-e Khūrīn; also known as Asadābād, Ḩūrīn, and Khūreh) is a village in Ilat-e Qaqazan-e Gharbi Rural District of Kuhin District in Qazvin County, Qazvin province, Iran.

== Demographics ==
=== Population ===
At the time of the 2006 National Census, the village's population was 86 in 17 households. The following census in 2011 counted 55 people in 17 households. The 2016 census measured the population of the village as 203 people in 66 households.
