= Yalabad, Qazvin =

Village in Qazvin province, Iran

Yalabad Persian: یل آباد
- Village
- Location within Iran
- Coordinates: 36°21′01″N 49°34′18″E
- Country: Iran
- Province: Qazvin
- County: Qazvin
- District: Kuhin
- Rural District: Ilat-e Qaqazan-e Gharbi

Population (2016)
  - Total: 390
- Time zone: UTC+3:30 (IRST)

Yalabad (Persian: یل آباد) (Note: Also romanized as Yalābād and Yelābād) is a village in Ilat-e Qaqazan-e Gharbi Rural District of Kuhin District in Qazvin County, Qazvin province, Iran.

== Demographics ==
=== Ethnicity ===
The village is populated by Azerbaijani Turks.

=== Population ===
At the time of the 2006 National Census, the village's population was 437 in 99 households. The following census in 2011 counted 207 people in 59 households. The 2016 census measured the population of the village as 390 people in 142 households.
