= Arasht, Qazvin =

Village in Qazvin province, Iran

Arasht Persian: ارشت
- Village
- Location within Iran
- Coordinates: 36°20′35″N 49°44′47″E
- Country: Iran
- Province: Qazvin
- County: Qazvin
- District: Kuhin
- Rural District: Ilat-e Qaqazan-e Sharqi

Population (2016)
  - Total: 911
- Time zone: UTC+3:30 (IRST)

Arasht (Persian: ارشت) (Note: Also romanized as Ārshet; also known as Ārisht and Arshit) is a village in Ilat-e Qaqazan-e Sharqi Rural District of Kuhin District in Qazvin County, Qazvin province, Iran.

== Demographics ==
=== Population ===
At the time of the 2006 National Census, the village's population was 777 in 176 households. The following census in 2011 counted 776 people in 220 households. The 2016 census measured the population of the village as 911 people in 271 households.
