= Bak Kandi =

Village in Qazvin province, Iran

Bak Kandi Persian: بك كندي
- Village
- Location within Iran
- Coordinates: 36°23′23″N 49°34′25″E
- Country: Iran
- Province: Qazvin
- County: Qazvin
- District: Kuhin
- Rural District: Ilat-e Qaqazan-e Gharbi

Population (2016)
  - Total: 714
- Time zone: UTC+3:30 (IRST)

Bak Kandi (Persian: بك كندي) (Note: Also romanized as Bak Kandī; also known as Bakandī, Beg Kandī, Beyg Kandī, and Bikandi) is a village in Ilat-e Qaqazan-e Gharbi Rural District of Kuhin District in Qazvin County, Qazvin province, Iran.

== Demographics ==
=== Population ===
At the time of the 2006 National Census, the village's population was 1,446 in 362 households. The following census in 2011 counted 1,117 people in 296 households. The 2016 census measured the population of the village as 714 people in 242 households. It was the most populous village in its rural district.
