= Sanjanak, Fars =

Sanjanak سنجانك
- Village
- Location within Iran
- Coordinates: 29°26′27″N 52°32′52″E
- Country: Iran
- Province: Fars
- County: Shiraz
- Bakhsh: Central
- Rural District: Qarah Bagh

Population (2006)
  - Total: 651
- Time zone: UTC+3:30 (IRST)
  - Summer (DST): UTC+4:30 (IRDT)

Sanjanak (Persian: سنجانك, also Romanized as Sanjānak; also known as Sangānak) is a village in Qarah Bagh Rural District, in the Central District of Shiraz County, Fars province, Iran. At the 2006 census, its population was 651, in 164 families.
