= Kharagan =

Kharagan خارگان
- Village
- Location within Iran
- Coordinates: 29°25′31″N 52°23′18″E
- Country: Iran
- Province: Fars
- County: Shiraz
- Bakhsh: Central
- Rural District: Siyakh Darengun

Population (2006)
  - Total: 304
- Time zone: UTC+3:30 (IRST)
  - Summer (DST): UTC+4:30 (IRDT)

Kharagan (Persian: خارگان, also Romanized as Khāragān; also known as Khārakān) is a village in Siyakh Darengun Rural District, in the Central District of Shiraz County, Fars province, Iran. At the 2006 census, its population was 304, in 77 families.
