= Patar, Iran =

Patar پتار
- Village
- Location within Iran
- Coordinates: 25°19′10″N 61°08′10″E
- Country: Iran
- Province: Sistan and Baluchestan
- County: Chabahar
- Bakhsh: Dashtiari
- Rural District: Negur

Population (2007)
  - Total: 790
- Time zone: UTC+3:30 (IRST)
  - Summer (DST): UTC+4:30 (IRDT)

Patar (Persian: پتار, also romanized as Patār and Petār; also known as Patr) is a village in Negur Rural District, Dashtiari District, Chabahar County, Sistan and Baluchestan Province, Iran. At the 2006 census, its population was 790, in 147 families.
