= Uri Ruiz Bikandi =

Spanish philologist and educator (1950–2023)

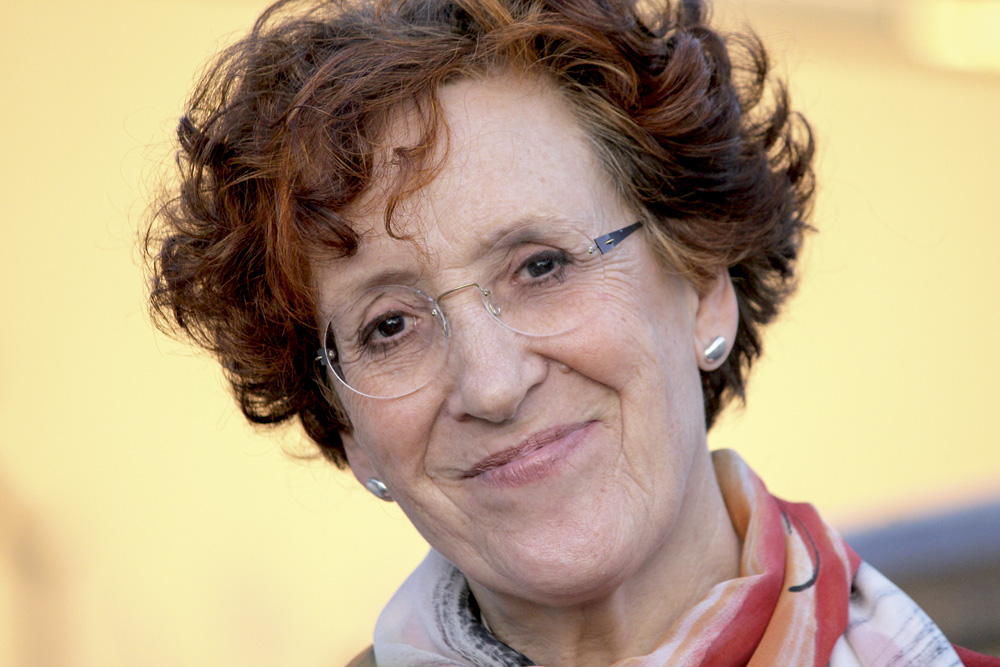
Bikandi in 2017

María Uribarri Ruiz Bikandi (24 May 1950 – 21 February 2023), known as Uri Ruiz Bikandi or Uri Ruiz-Bikandi, was a Spanish philologist and educator specialising in bilingual education.

She was born in Durango on 24 May 1950. She studied the Basque language in her youth and was involved in campaigns to revitalise the language.

She was a professor of the didactics of language and literature at the University of the Basque Country.

== Selected publications ==
- Ruiz Bikandi, Uri; Abascal, Maria Dolores (2011). Didactica de la lengua castellana y la literatura. Editorial Grao. ISBN 9788499800868.
- Ruiz Bikandi, Uri, ed. (2000). Didáctica de la Segunda Lengua en Educación Infantil y Primaria. Sintesis. ISBN 9788477387701.
