= Ilat-e Qaqazan-e Sharqi Rural District =

Rural district in Qazvin province, Iran

Ilat-e Qaqazan-e Sharqi Rural District Persian: دهستان ايلات قاقازان شرقی
- Rural District
- Location within Iran
- Coordinates: 36°26′N 49°49′E
- Country: Iran
- Province: Qazvin
- County: Qazvin
- District: Kuhin
- Established: 1987
- Capital: Aqa Baba

Population (2016)
  - Total: 10,650
- Time zone: UTC+3:30 (IRST)

Ilat-e Qaqazan-e Sharqi Rural District (Persian: دهستان ايلات قاقازان شرقی) is in Kuhin District of Qazvin County, Qazvin province, Iran. Its capital is the village of Aqa Baba.

== Demographics ==
=== Population ===
At the time of the 2006 National Census, the rural district's population was 9,880 in 2,284 households. There were 9,543 inhabitants in 2,599 households at the following census of 2011. The 2016 census measured the population of the rural district as 10,650 in 3,231 households. The most populous of its 41 villages was Aqa Baba, with 2,343 people.

=== Other villages in the rural district ===
- Arasht
- Bashar
- Buinak
- Hoseynabad
- Kushkak
- Senjanak
- Shenazand
