= Ilat-e Qaqazan-e Gharbi Rural District =

Rural district in Qazvin province, Iran

Ilat-e Qaqazan-e Gharbi Rural District Persian: دهستان ايلات قاقازان غربی
- Rural District
- Location within Iran
- Coordinates: 36°27′N 49°38′E
- Country: Iran
- Province: Qazvin
- County: Qazvin
- District: Kuhin
- Established: 1987
- Capital: Kuhin

Population (2016)
  - Total: 7,161
- Time zone: UTC+3:30 (IRST)

Ilat-e Qaqazan-e Gharbi Rural District (Persian: دهستان ايلات قاقازان غربی) is in Kuhin District of Qazvin County, Qazvin province, Iran. It is administered from the city of Kuhin.

== Demographics ==
=== Population ===
At the time of the 2006 National Census, the rural district's population was 6,133 in 1,399 households. There were 4,422 inhabitants in 1,256 households at the following census of 2011. The 2016 census measured the population of the rural district as 7,161 in 2,497 households. The most populous of its 98 villages was Bak Kandi, with 714 people.

=== Other villages in the rural district ===
- Asadabad-e Khurin
- Astin Dar-e Sofla
- Bahramabad-e Qaqazan
- Dudah Chay
- Hesamabad
- Jam Jerd
- Tazarkosh
- Yalabad
- Yaleh Gonbad
