= Kuhin District =

District in Qazvin province, Iran

Kuhin District Persian: بخش کوهین
- District
- Location within Iran
- Coordinates: 36°26′N 49°41′E
- Country: Iran
- Province: Qazvin
- County: Qazvin
- Established: 2000
- Capital: Kuhin

Population (2016)
  - Total: 19,222
- Time zone: UTC+3:30 (IRST)

Kuhin District (Persian: بخش کوهین) is in Qazvin County, Qazvin province, Iran. Its capital is the city of Kuhin.

== Demographics ==
=== Population ===
At the time of the 2006 National Census, the district's population was 17,411 in 4,071 households. The following census in 2011 counted 15,587 people in 4,269 households. The 2016 census measured the population of the district as 19,222 inhabitants in 6,146 households.

=== Administrative divisions ===
Kuhin District Population
Administrative Divisions	2006	2011	2016
Ilat-e Qaqazan-e Gharbi RD	6,133	4,422	7,161
Ilat-e Qaqazan-e Sharqi RD	9,880	9,543	10,650
Kuhin (city)	1,398	1,622	1,411
Total	17,411	15,587	19,222
RD = Rural District
