= 2016 Ariyalur gang rape case =

Crime in Tamil Nadu, India

The 2016 Ariyalur gang rape refers to the gang rape and murder of a pregnant 17-year-old minor Dalit girl, Nandhini, by a Union secretary and three of his friends in December 2016 in Ariyalur District. The men gang raped her and pulled out the fetus from her womb after cutting her genitalia with a blade. Nandhini died at the spot due to excessive bleeding. The men then threw her body into a nearby well. Her body was found in the well with her hands tied in a decomposed state, stripped of her clothes and jewellery.

Police reports revealed that the Hindu Munnani Union Secretary was irked at Nandhini, a lower-caste Dalit girl, insisting on marrying her after she got pregnant with him after being in a relationship with her for a year. He was also pressuring her to go for an abortion before the incident. He attempted suicide by drinking poison while he was being traced for the crime and later confessed his crimes to the village administrative officer.

All the men involved in the crime were arrested under the Goondas Act.

== Background ==
=== Caste division ===
Nandhni, aged 17, belonged to the Sirukadambur village in Ariyalur district. She belonged to the Dalit Community. The family resides in the 'colony' in the village of Sirukadambur, a community planned specifically for the Dalits. Caste-based segregation is common in the villages of Tamil Nadu. Yellow flags with mango icons, signaling solidarity for the Vanniyar-dominated Pattali Makkal Katchi, decorate homes on the Vanniyar side of the village, which has about 3000 households. While the 300 Dalit families reside in either government-sponsored households or huts made of dried coconut leaves, the support of the Dalits is spread among the Dravida Munnetra Kazhagam, Viduthalai Chiruthaigal Katchi and All India Anna Dravida Munnetra Kazhagam.

=== Relationship with Manikandan ===
Nandini studied up to class 8, helping her family with construction work, primarily concrete laying, taking home ₹50 to ₹100 a day. Borrowing a mobile from her financially and caste-privileged friends, she spent a long time talking to Manikandan, moving on to a year-long relationship. Manikandan, aged 26, belonged to the dominant caste Vanniyar community, he was also a Hindu Munnani Union Secretary, who studied up to 10th standard and oversaw concrete laying work under the direction of the local leader of the Hindu Munnani, a fringe group formed in 1980. As they worked together, they went into a relationship. Manikandan's neighbor claimed he used to drop her in home after work during late nights and she also a waited outside the Dalit toilet outhouse to talk with him. Manikandan is also an individual with a criminal record with several lawsuits targeting him, including vandalization of 2 Churches and being a nuisance to the Public.

== Timeline of events ==
29 December 2016, Nandini went missing. On the night at about 8:30 p.m of the same day, Nandhini's mother's relative received a call from a person who told he was from Vellur and Nandhini was in his custody. She also mentioned that she had doubt on Manikandan in the complaint. The Police summoned Manikandan, but he refused any involvement, and the local sub-inspector allowed him to go.

30 December 2016, Nandhini's family files a kidnap complaint, her mother made a complaint that "Manikandan belonging to the Hindu Munnani kidnapped her daughter" but the police instead told her to make a complaint that "her daughter was missing". The police lodged a "missing" complaint. This is in breach of Section 361 of the Indian Penal Code, which explicitly specifies that if a minor is taken away without any of the proper permission of their guardian, the child is considered to be kidnapped.

5 January 2017, The police registers FIR and begin the inquiry. Devi, a friend of the Nandhini, informs the police about relationship between Nandhini and Manikandan and that Nandhini was pregnant. Manikandan was called by the Irumbulikurichi police for an inquiry on 5 January, but after a number of hours two members of his village signed witnesses on behalf of him and he was allowed to go. The family accused the Hindu Munnani district District Organiser of using his political clout to get the police to let Manikandan go home. The next day, Manikandan went into hiding.

9 January 2017, The Police starts investigation on the friends of Manikandan.

12 January 2017, Manikhandan is admitted to the hospital after he consumed poison. Manikandan had attempted suicide by ingesting poison in a cashew forest in the village of Kodukkur. The Kuvagam police station filed a case and obtained Manikandan 's confession, where he confessed that he had tried to commit suicide because was being tracked back to the murder of Nandhini.

14 January 2017, Manikandan reveals that he killed Nandhini in an extrajudicial statement to the Village Administrative Officer. Nandhini's naked body was discovered in a well in the village of Kilmaligai, with her clothing and jewels stripped off and her hands tied. Nandini's family members were called to identify the body and they confirmed it.

== Incident ==
Police Investigations on the Hindu Munnani Union Secretary after they found Nandini's body on 14 January reported that Nandini wanted Manikandan to marry her following her pregnancy while he pressured her to get an abortion. He was not really willing to marry her because she from the Paraiyar caste, a Dalit community. Nandhini stormed out of her house because it was hard to conceal her conception from her family.

The Police also revealed that she was abducted by Manikandan, the prime accused. Three days later, she was raped by him and his three mates. Later the men cut her genitalia with a blade and pulled out the foetus from her womb, due to excessive bleeding Nandini died on the spot. The men tied her hands, then tied her body with a stone and tossed it into a nearby well. In order to avoid further suspicion, they killed a dog and put its body in the same well.

The partly decomposed body of Nandhini was discovered in the dry village of Sirukadambur on 14 January. She was found with her hands tied at her back and her clothes and jewellery stripped off.

== Autopsy ==
Post-mortem of Nandhini's body was conducted in the Ariyalur Government hospital. The Autopsy results revealed that Nandhini was raped and murdered. On the basis of a post-mortem examination, which describes the level of the body's decay, the police said that her death happened two weeks before the corpse was discovered and that she had not been kept in unlawful detention. The activists and the victim's family were not persuaded by the reports. Advocate Sasikumar, an Ariyalur activist who had assembled a fact-finding committee, claimed that Nandhini had been seen with Manikandan till 3 January. The family claimed that the police were attempting to fix the death date as 29 December in order to cover up their inability to track down the victim.

== Arrests ==
According to the DSP counter-affidavit, on 14 January, Manikandan surrendered to the Village Administrative Officer and admitted to his crimes. Manikandan was arrested on Goondas act and was jailed at Trichy Central prison. Three of Manikandan's friends were arrested on 15 January 2017.

== Reactions ==
The hashtag #Justice4Nandhini was trended on social media by thousands of people.

District secretary of the Bahujan Samaj Party, Chinnadurai said that "there is no doubt that the Rashtriya Swayamsevak Sangh (RSS) and the Hindu Munnani are behind this".

The Tamil Nadu Untouchability eradication front said that "the incident caused great turmoil throughout Tamil Nadu. But now, the police and the Bharatiya Janata Party are working together to dilute the case".

Actor Kamal Haasan urged justice for the gang rape and murder and also apologized for voicing his concerns late.

Music Director G. V. Prakash Kumar also urged for the justice for the victims and proper punishment for the criminals in social media.

The President of DMK, M. K Stalin came to the village and stated that his party would campaign for a CB-CID investigation.

The Manithaneya Makkal Katchi demanded severe punishment for the criminals.

== Controversy ==
=== Treatment by police ===
The family believes that one more person has also been engaged in the crime. According to the family, Hindu Munnani 's district secretary is also part of the crime because Manikandan works with him. The family also stated that several villagers alleged that the district secretary already knew about the crime in advance. The Ariyalur Police reported that there had been no proof against the District Secretary while Sasikumar, a family lawyer, asserted that the Hindu Munnani District Secretary had not been inquired at all. Nandini's sister claimed that if the police had investigated properly when their family gave the first complaint their sister will be alive. Nandini's mother claimed that the Deputy Superintendent of Police visited her home on 16 January and ridiculed her and also said that she had not raised her daughter in a proper way.

However, a local Sub inspector told that the accused is closely linked to Hindu Munnani's district secretary who is renowned for his rowdyism. They instigate violence during church services on the excuse of defending the Hindus. As a consequence of their background of violence, they needed to deal sensitively with the situation in order to prevent more turmoil.

== Court verdicts ==
In April 2017, the High Court of Madras ordered Criminal Investigation Department (India) (CB-CID) to examine the crime. Justice R. Mahadevan, gave the directive after seeing the girl's mother's original criminal complaint.

In April 2019, the Madras High Court declined to transfer the gang rape case to the CB-CID. Justice G. K. Ilanthiraiyan, instructed the police to apply Section 376 D of the Indian Penal Code to the charges and to conclude the inquiry within 6 months. The judge gave the order on the ground that transferring the case would serve no purpose "at this point".

== See also ==
- 1997 Melavalavu massacre
