= 2018 Ambalapattu violence =

Violence against the Dalit community in Tamil Nadu

- Violence against Dalit community in Ambalapattu, Tamil Nadu
- Date: 31 December 2017 – 1 January 2018
- Location: Ambalapattu, Tamil Nadu
- Caused by: Caste tensions
- Methods: Rioting, assault

Casualties
- Injuries: 8 Dalits (4 hospitalized)
- Arrested: 6
- Damage: 15 Dalit houses Damaged; 15 vehicles belonging to the Dalits were Damaged; Household items, Television, utensils destroyed

The 2018 Ambalapattu violence refers to the violence on New Year's Eve of 2018 in a Dalit settlement in the village of Ambalapattu, Tamil Nadu. The settlement was attacked by dominant caste villagers during the New year celebrations by the Dalit community. Around 80 dominant caste villagers damaged Dalit homes, motor-bikes and properties. 8 Dalits were injured and 4 were admitted to the hospital. The attacks led to protests and road blocks by thousands of villagers and political parties across the state to bring the attackers to justice. Six men from the dominant caste community were arrested in the next two days for the violence.

== Background ==
The Dalit villagers reside in the settlement of Kudikadu, in the south of the large village of Ambalapattu. This settlement has a dominant caste group consisting of at least 300 Kallar caste families, and a relatively small Dalit Paraiyar population consisting of about 60 households. "Little Singapore" and it is also reported that Dalit families were well-educated, with many members working in government jobs. And the area has been a Communist heartland for over 6 decades, with inhabitants opposing oppression by Zamindars and supporting relationship and economic development for all classes.

=== New year celebrations ===
The Dalit community in Kudikadu had planned for a new year celebration on the mid-night of 31 December 2017. The people festooned the colony's entrance with a balloon arch and celebrated the new year by boiling over milk, a Tamil tradition connected to Pongal festival. They also celebrated the new year by cutting a cake. For a dance program in which the children of the colony took part, a sound system had been set up. Each year, the colony's youth organize this festivities after raising money from the colony's residents.

=== Scuffle between the villagers ===
Some Dalit villagers saw a group of youngsters from the dominant caste Kallar group standing close to the entrance of their colony at around 12.30am on 1 January 2018. These men were in the northern area of the village, from a settlement about 3 km away. The Dalit villagers asserted that the men damaged the arch which they built for celebration. This led to a scuffle between the two groups which led to injury to one Dalit man. The scuffle was quickly broken up.

== Attacks ==
After an hour, a group of around 80 dominant caste members belonging to the Kallar caste, armed with knives, rods and other weapons, reached the Dalit colony in Kudikadu. They also allegedly brought the weapons in a van. The dominant caste members reportedly stirred up a quarrel over the sound system which were used for the celebrations. Then they went on rampage, damaging properties and ransacking Dalit houses. They reportedly cut off the power supply to the Dalit colony before their attacks. The dominant caste members reportedly screamed ,"Why do you have to wear pants and shirts?" and Why do you need to celebrate New Year, lower caste dogs? during their attacks.

The Dalit men begged the attackers to spare their families while the women locked themselves up in their homes in panic as the mob attacked. The attacks lasted for thirty minutes before the attackers left having taught the Dalits "a lesson." Some Dalits locked them up inside their houses while others escaped to the nearby fields.

The villagers alleged that the violence ended with very few casualties because the Dalit men refrained from fighting back.

== Damages ==
15 motor bikes and 15 houses belonging to the Dalits were damaged. House hold articles including utensils, furniture, water pipes and Televisions were also destroyed. The sound system was also reportedly destroyed.

The attacks left 8 Dalits seriously injured and 4 men were hospitalized.

== Protests ==
The next morning on 1 January 2018, more than a thousand villagers protested to arrest the attackers, to provide compensation to the affected and also demanded the District Collector to visit the spot. The protesters blocked the roads and the traffic was disrupted from 10 am to 1 pm and the vehicles were diverted. High level functionaries of the Communist Party of India (Marxist) and Communist Party of India and founder of the Adi Dravida Munnetra Kazhakam and members of various parties took part in the road blockade and raised slogans.

The Tamil Nadu Untouchability Eradication Front made a demonstration in front of the Tiruvallur bus stand condemning the attacks.

== Arrests ==
Two days after the attack 6 men from the kallar community were arrested for the attacks.

== Investigations ==
Kathir, the founder of Evidence, a Non-governmental organization based in Madurai, said caste discrimination is deeply rooted, though in a dormant form, in the social structure of villages in this area. He added that the involvement of many left-wing parties in the area may also have been the explanation for fewer attacks in the recent times. He said these attacks typically occur when Dalits speak up against attacks against them, or when they progress economically. He said that the society was assaulted as this colony has a lot of members in good government positions.

== See also ==
- 2004 Kalapatti violence
- 2012 Dharmapuri violence
