= 2019 Mettupalayam wall collapse =

Collapse of a wall which killed 17 people and led to protests

The 2019 Mettupalayam wall collapse refers to the collapse of a 20-foot wall on several houses during heavy rains in December 2019 which killed 17 people during their sleep, all members of the Dalit community. The incident happened in small village called Nadur in Mettupalayam, Tamil Nadu, in southern India. The incident led to protests mostly from the local villagers and pro-Dalit organizations who claimed it was built to segregate the members of the Dalit Community.

== Incident ==
The incident occurred on around 5:30 a.m on 2 December 2019, when a portion of a 20-foot wall collapsed on four houses, killing 17 people inside while they were asleep. The deceased included 2 males, 3 children and 10 females. It happened during the heavy rains of December 2019 where more than 1000 people were kept in relief camps in various districts in the state. Police reported that the compound wall became wet due to the rains and collapsed, burying the victims alive during their sleep. The Fire department took three hours to recover the bodies of the victims.

The wall was built with basalt rocks and was 80 feet long, 22 feet tall and 2 feet wide. It was built 10 years earlier and it was also claimed by the villagers that it was built to isolate the Dalit-settlements from the two-acre property of the owner. The residents of the colony had been demanding the removal of the wall for several years, stating it was a threat to their safety.

== Protests ==
On 2 December 2019, This led to huge protests just hours after the incident, when protesters of pro-Dalit organizations, the local villagers and the relatives of the dead assembled in front the Government Hospital in Mettupalayam, where the bodies were kept, and raised slogans. The police later arrested 25 protesters, the protesters were sent to jail for 15 days. The protesters claimed it was a wall of discrimination to keep the Dalits at bay. The Thanthai Periyar Dravidar Kazhagam, started their protests demanding the release of the 24 arrested protesters. The same day hundreds of people joined by various political parties blocked the road in front of the Mettupalayam Government hospital and continued their protests till police dispersed them.

On 3 December 2019, Members belonging to the Aathi Thamizhar Peravai blocked the roads near Goripalayam demanding a hike of ₹20 lakhs from the ₹4 lakhs announced by the government to the families of the victims.

On 22 December 2019, Tamil Puligal, a Dalit organization claimed that over 3000 members of the Dailt community will be converting to Islam as a sign of protest against wall collapse incident and the discrimination. However, some residents of Nadur village rejected these claims. One convert said that "converting legally are being threatened by the police. As a result, there are people who can't talk about the conversion openly". While some villagers alleged that the members of the Hindu Munnani, a Sangh Parivar outfit and one of the frontal Organizations of the Rashtriya Swayamsevak Sangh (RSS) in the state, visited the villagers and threatened them against their conversion to Islam.

In February 2020, the Tamil Puligal claimed that more than 430 Dalits have legally converted to Islam in various areas in Coimbatore as a protest against the wall collapse incident and discrimination.

== Reactions ==
The Government of Tamil Nadu announced a relief of Rs 4 lakh each to the family members of the deceased from the State Disaster Relief Fund.

Dravida Munnetra kazhagam president M.K Stalin visited the families of the deceased and said the government should give government job to a family member. He also said the disaster could have been prevented if the officials had not shown any negligence.

The Viduthalai Chiruthaigal Katchi, leader Thol. Thirumavalavan visited the village and consoled the families of the victims. D. Ravikumar one of the leaders of the party also mentioned the incident in the Lok Sabha.

The Chief Minister of Kerala, Pinarayi Vijayan expressed his condolences and said that the government of Kerala is ready to provide any help for the families of the victims.

Makkal Needhi Maiam president Kamal Haasan said that no amount of relief can compensate for the loss and expressed his condolences.

Director Pa. Ranjith said it was a discriminatory wall and accused the AIADMK government for trying to suppress the incident.

== See also ==
- 1997 Melavalavu massacre
- 2004 Kalapatti violence
- Uthapuram caste wall
