= 2019 Ponparappi violence =

Anti-Dalit violence in Ponparappi, Tamil Nadu

- Violence against Dalit community in Ponparappi, Tamil Nadu
- Date: 18 April 2019
- Location: Ponparappi, Tamil Nadu
- Caused by: Caste tensions, Political tensions
- Methods: Rioting, assault

Casualties
- Injuries: 18
- Damage: 65-115 Dalit houses damaged; 25 Dalit houses completely damaged

The 2019 Ponparappi violence happened on April 18, 2019, during the polling day for the 2019 Indian general election in the village of Ponparappi, Tamil Nadu. The violence reportedly started as scuffles and agitations between the supporters of Viduthalai Chiruthaigal Katchi (VCK) and the members of Pattali Makkal Katchi (PMK) together with the members of Hindu Munnani, which reportedly led to violence by the members of the PMK on a Dalit colony. 60 to115 Dalit houses were damaged and Dalits were assaulted.

Tensions started during the polling for the 2019 Indian general election where some members of the Hindu Munnani reportedly broke a pot which is the election symbol of the VCK and when some members of the PMK reportedly prevented an elderly Dalit person to vote in the elections. These tensions led to scuffles and stone pelting between the two parties. Later a mob of 100 people reportedly belonging to the PMK went on to attack the Dalit colony damaging Dalit owned houses, house-hold items and vehicles and assaulted Dalit people including women and children. There were also reports of sexual abuse on Dalit women.

The Study carried out by the Madras Institute of Development Studies (MIDS) blamed the Hindu Munnani and the PMK for the Violence. MIDS also reported that the attack was "pre-planned and murderous".

== Background ==
The village of Ponparappi is situated in the Ariyalur district of the Indian state of Tamil Nadu. The village had over 300 families belonging to the Dalit community and 1000 families belonging to the Vanniyar caste. The Dalits also had to cross into the area of the dominant caste Vanniyars for Swachh Bharat and Mahatma Gandhi National Rural Employment Guarantee Act (MGNREGA) schemes.

The popularity of the Hindu Munnani, a Hindutva outfit, had grown among the dominant caste Vanniyars owing to the presence of Christians among the Scheduled Caste population.

=== Election violations ===
Frequent violent incidents, repeated casting of votes, mass deletion of names of voters and such were recorded on polling day from several parts of the State. In the Dharmapuri lok sabha constituency's Nathamedu village in Pappireddipatti, men reportedly belong to the PMK were seen casting fraudulent votes. A security officer of the CISF at Keezhvisharam in Vellore fired shots in the air to break two different groups of party members engaging in fist fights.

== Tensions ==
Tensions reportedly began when some people belonging to VCK tried to prevent an elderly person to vote, the person voted with the help of the police and when members of the Hindu Munnani shattered an earthen pot under alcoholic influence at the front of the panchyat office where the polling took place for the 2019 Indian general election. The earthen pot was the election symbol of the Viduthalai Chiruthaigal Katchi. MIDS blamed PMK that it spread a rumor that a Dalit youth assaulted a disabled Vanniyar man, who used to sell alcohol in the region. The animosity between the two parties intensified, leading to scuffles, stone pelting and damaging of the VCK party flag on the road side.

== Attacks ==
The attacks started in April 2018 when a mob of about 100 dominant caste members, reportedly belonging the PMK party, an ally of the AIADMK and the Bharatiya Janata Party (BJP), entered the Dalit colony on the polling day of the 2019 Indian general election and went on a rampage attacking the Dalits including the children and women and damaging motor bikes. The violence lasted for an hour and left 2 Vanniyars and 16 Dalits injured. Nearly 65 houses and 12 two-wheelers were reportedly damaged as per initial reports.

Over 100 people had abstained from voting as a result of the attack, though some Dalit students who graduated classes 10th and 12th did not go to get their certificates since their schools were located in the Vanniyar region.

=== Investigations ===
The Madras Institute of Developmental Studies (MIDS) carried out a study on April 25 which reported that the PMK and the Hindu Munnani were responsible for the attacks. The team also reported that the Dalit women were pulled out of their homes, and were verbally and sexually abused by the assailants. While women pleaded them to leave, the assailants proceeded to abuse the women. The team also termed the violence as "preconceived and murderous".

Evidence, a rights organization based in Madurai, which conducted an evaluation on the spot and reported that 115 houses had been damaged and 25 among them were completely damaged, 13 people were hospitalized and many sustained injuries to the head. The organization reported that the attackers have used derogatory language against women and victims. The founder of the organization, Kathir reported that the residents of the Dalit colony voted overwhelmingly for the VCK, which angered the PMK and led to the violence. The organization also requested to call the National Human Rights Commission of India (NHRC) instead of allowing the police to investigate the violence.

== Arrests ==
25 cases were filed against the members of the Hindu Munnani and the PMK by the police which included a member of the Hindu Munnani who was also accused in the 2016 Ariyalur gang rape case. The police also filed 24 cases against the Dalits as counter FIR's to force them to come into terms.

After the violence 9 men belonging to the VCK were also arrested for circulating offensive audio related to the violence.

== Political reactions ==
The fact-finding team of the Tamil Nadu state unit of the Congress SC and ST cell reported that the police officers stayed as a silent spectator as of the dominant caste group targeted Dalits and their properties. They also claimed that the PMK and the Hindu Munnani were responsible for the violence. The Party's general secretary K. Jeyakumar, said that violence happens only in the areas where the PMK is in the majority.

The Amma Makkal Munnetra kazhagam (AMMK) general secretary TTV Dinakaran also blamed the police for failing to prevent the attack.

The PMK asserted that the conflict on the day of polling was staged by the VCK to frame the PMK.

M K Stalin, the president of the Dravida Munnetra Kazhgam condemned the violence and also urged the Chief Electoral Officer and DGP for Election to take measures to develop the people into fraternity.

Thol Thirumavalavan, the leader of the VCK blamed the PMK and the Hindu Munnani for the violence and also said that the AIADMK and BJP have unleashed violence in various places for fear of losing the elections in Tamil Nadu. In particular, the PMK is inciting caste-based violence to win the polls. He also stated that he would seek for a re-poll and said that 150 homes were damaged during the violence. He also said that the police remained as a mute spectators.

Vaiko of the Marumalarchi Dravida Munnetra Kazhagam condemned the violence and also blamed the police for failing to stop the violence.

Kamal Haasan compared the violence with his delayed drama Marudhanayagam which talks about caste violence 300 years ago. He also said that the violence is a shame to the entire Tamil race.

== See also ==
- 2004 Kalapatti violence
