= Kausalya Shankar =

Indian activist

- Born: 1996 or 1997 (age 29–30); Kuppamapalayam village, Dindigul district, Tamil Nadu, India
- Known for: Anti-caste activism, Udumalai Shankar murder case

Kausalya (born 1996 or 1997) is an Indian anti-caste activist. She became a cause célèbre after her former husband V. Shankar was hacked to death in 2016 in an honour killing by killers hired by her family. Her case, known as Udumalai Shankar murder case, became emblematic of the endemic issue of honour killings of inter-caste couples, as well as the enduring issues of caste violence in Tamil Nadu. Her family were opposed to her inter-caste marriage. She is a Thevar, while Shankar belonged to the Pallar caste. On 9 December 2018, she wedded Sakthi in Coimbatore. Her decision to get remarried was received well with wishes pouring in from many sections.

== Biography ==
Kausalya was born to P. Chinnasamy, an auto driver and financier, and Annalakshmi, a housewife in Kuppamapalayam village, Dindigul district in southern Tamil Nadu. She has a younger brother Gowtham. In 2007, the family moved to Palani when Kausalya was studying 6th standard. According to her brother, she was a good student, getting over 1000 marks in her 12th board exams, and was "allowed" to go to PA Engineering College in Pollachi in 2014. On the first day, she was met by Shankar, who proposed to her on their second day. Shankar came from an economically backward family. His father was a daily wager. At first she turned him down, but developed a strong friendship over the next six months that blossomed into romance. Relatives who saw her relationship with Shankar told her parents. Once they found out Shankar was a member of the Devendra kula vellalar community, who have clashed with Thevars before, they fought with Kausalya about her relationship with him. After this fight, Kausalya decided to marry Shankar and drop out of college in March 2015. She moved to Shankar's village. A month after their marriage, Chinnasamy tried to forcibly separate the couple. He lied that Kausalya's grandfather was ill, and instead abducted her and took her to Dindigul. This plot was foiled when Shankar filed a Missing Person's complaint. Afterwards, the family tried to bribe Shankar with 10 lakhs to end the marriage, but he refused. Afterwards, Chinnasamy decided to kill the couple by hiring hitmen.

On 12 March 2016, Shankar and Kausalya left their hut and went to buy a new shirt for Shankar in Udumalaipettai. As they were returning from a clothing shop, they were about to cross the road to the bus stop. At that moment, six killers hired by Chinnasamy arrived on two motorbikes. In front of a large crowd, they attacked the couple, slashing them with long knives. After 36 seconds, they fled on the bikes. Shankar struggled to run away, while Kausalya was attacked again until she got under a car. An ambulance took the two to the hospital. Kausalya held her husband in her arms and he stopped breathing as they passed the hospital gate. Shankar had 34 cuts on him.

After the killing, she remained in hospital for 20 days. She told police her father was responsible. The case gained substantial media attention, and a trial was soon launched. In the prosecution of the killers, including her father, Kausalya was the main witness. She later gained a government job, but later lost it.

After the killings, she struggled a lot with depression and even attempted suicide. However, during the case, she testified against her entire family and wished them all convicted for their crime. She testified that her mother repeatedly said she would kill her and she was better off dead than married to Shankar. She also became an anti-caste and Dalit's rights activist, following the ideologies of B. R. Ambedkar and Periyar. All accused except for Annalakshmi and two others were convicted of the crime. Chinnasamy and four others were given death sentences, while two of the accused were given life. Kausalya has continued to work against caste, visiting other victims of caste violence and "honour" killings throughout the South and fighting for Dalit rights and the annihilation of caste. She also teaches underprivileged children at a school in Shankar's village.

On 9 December 2018, she wedded Sakthi in Coimbatore. Sakthi belongs to the same community as Kausalya. She has also visited victims of other "honour" killings like Divya, whose elopement with Ilavarasan (a Dalit) sparked the Dharmapuri riots of 2012, and Amrutha, whose husband Pranay was also killed by her parents in an "honour" killing. She continues to fight for a separate law against "honour" killings.

== In popular culture ==
The honour killing of Kausalya's first husband, Shankar, was the subject of two plays — Koumarane Valavane's Chandala: Impure and Sharmistha Saha's Romeo Ravidas and Juliet Devi. Their life was roughly depicted in the Tamil movie Magalir Mattum. However it was shown as alternative history where both survived and helped by the main protagonist, actress Jyothika.
