= 1997 Melavalavu massacre =

Caste related violence against Dalits

Coordinates: 10.101°N 78.356°E

- Location: Melavalavu, Madurai, Tamil Nadu
- Date: 30 June 1997
- Deaths: 7

The 1997 Melavalavu massacre refers to the murder of a Panchayat President of the village and six other men of the Dalit community by dominant caste members in Melavalavu, Madurai on 30 June 1997. The men were hacked to death after some dominant caste members refused to accept a Panchayat president from the Dalit Community.

Seventeen men were convicted for the crime and were sentenced to life imprisonment and three men were released in 2008. Thirteen of the convicted were released in 2019 during the AIADMK regime. The families of the victims claimed the early release had political overtones.

== Background ==
The Melavalavu panchayat is located in Melur Taluk, Madurai District. Melavalavu village, is dominated by the people of Kallar(Thevar) caste, while the people of the Scheduled Castes are a minority in the village residing mostly in Ambedkar Nagar area. The village Panchayat was allocated to the members of the Scheduled Castes as a reserved constituency in 1996 by the government. But the Dalits were threatened by the dominant castes that they should not contest the election as the Head of the Village Panchayat.

Following this, elections were held on 31 December 1996 due to the inability to hold elections on 9 October 1996 and 28 December 1996. Murugesan, a member of the Dalit community won the election. He went to the district collectors Office and asked the district collector and the Tamil Nadu government for protection for himself and his dependents after threats by dominant caste members who denied Dalits as their president and vice president of Panchayat. He along with six other men were murdered when they were returning in a town bus from Madurai after meeting the Collector office on 30 June 1997. The gang stopped the town bus near the village tank and hacked the Dalits to death.

Village Panchayat President, Murugesan, Vice President Mukan, Raja, Sellathurai, Sevmoorthy, Bhupathi and Soundarrajan were murdered. The Village Panchayat President K.Murugesan's head was cut off and thrown into a well, half a kilometer away.

== Convictions ==
The 40 persons were charged for the offences under Sections 120-B, 148, 341, 506 (ii), 302 read with 34 read with 149 IPC, and Section 302 read with Section 3 (2) (v) of the Scheduled Castes and Scheduled Tribes (Prevention of Atrocities) Act, 1989, read with 149 read with 34 IPC. Though 40 were framed, only 17 got convicted and the trial court failed to punish the accused under SC/ST Act. The State didn't appeal against the acquittal of the other 23 accused, but the convicts made appeal before Madras High Court, and their conviction was upheld by the Madras High Court.

Madras High Court criticized the trial court for not punishing the accused under SC/ST Act.

" The judgement of the trial court suffers from non-application of mind and the trial court failed to take into consideration the reliable testimony and the material evidence on record. Again, as rightly pointed out, the act of the accused was not merely to murder the deceased but also to terrorise the entire Scheduled Caste community from daring to stand for Panchayat election."

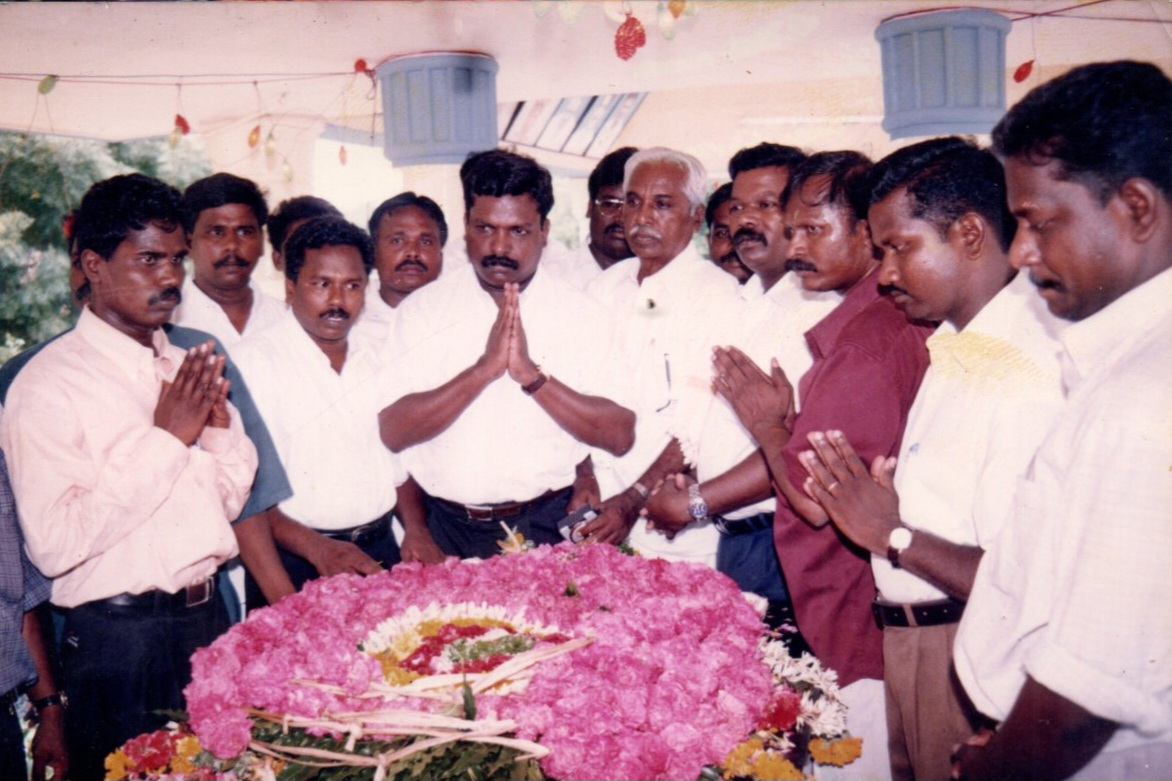
Thirumavalavan In murugesan memorial Melavalavu.

Homage paid at Melavalavu

In 2008, three men were released on C. N. Annadurai's birthday during the DMK regime. While one of the remaining 14 has died of snake bite during his trial. The remaining 13 people were released in 2019 during the birthday of M.G.R in AIADMK regime. The men were not allowed to enter the village and were made to stay in Vellore till a petition which demanded against their early release is completed. The families of the victims had also sent a petition to the state government against the early release of the convicts. They also claimed that the release had political overtones.

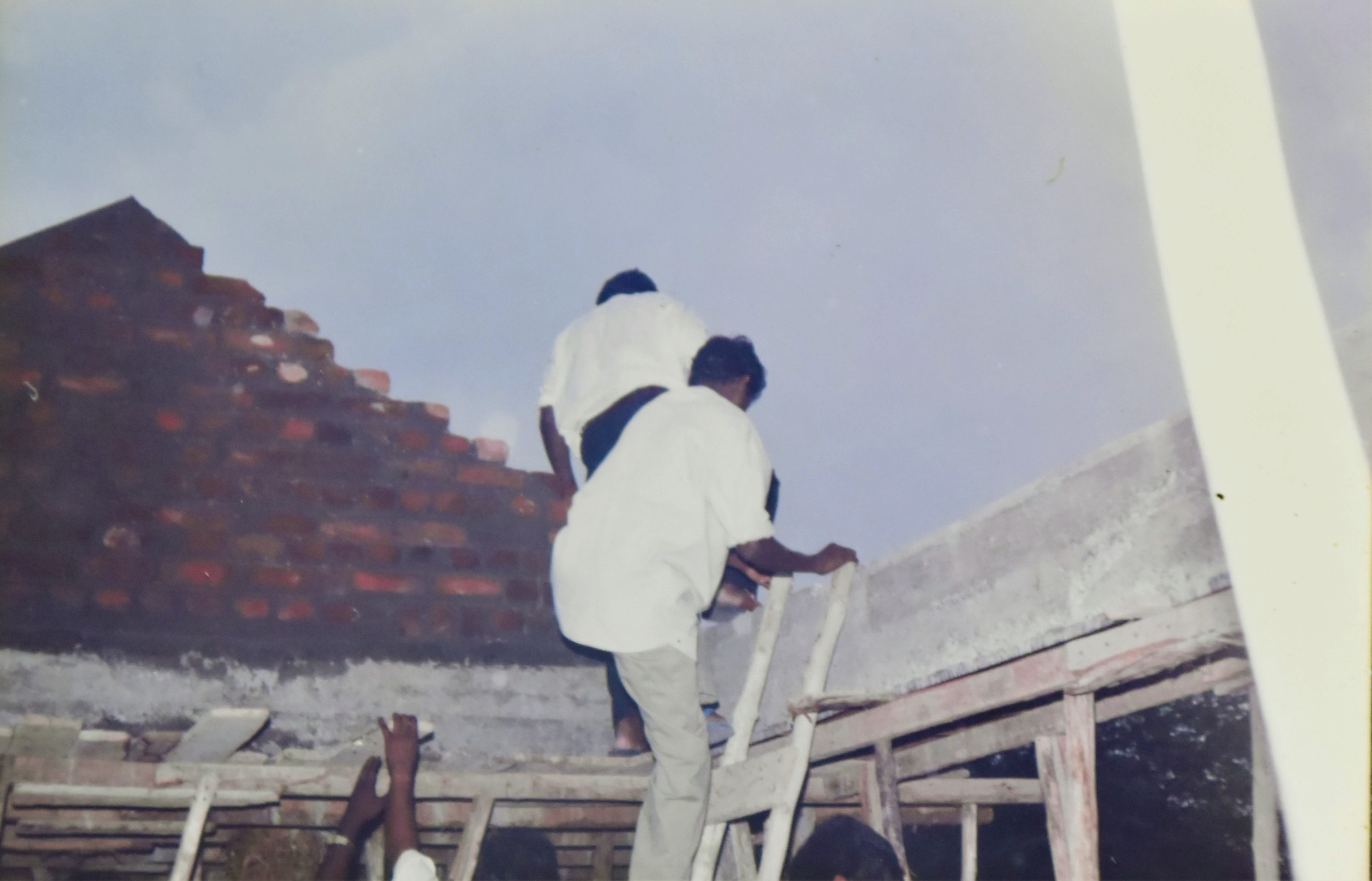
Construction of the memorial.

In February 2020, The Madras High Court withdrew the interim order which restricted the 13 convicts to Vellore district.

== Reactions ==
The Viduthalai Chiruthaigal Katchi(VCK), the Communist Party of India Marxist and other organisations commented against the release of the prisoners. The VCK built a memorial for the victims of murder and thousands of the party cadres gather there every year to pay their respects.

On 22 November 2019, police arrested Tamil Nadu Untouchability Eradication Front protesters at Madurai for protesting against the release of the prisoners.

== See also ==
- 2019 Mettupalayam wall collapse
- 2004 Kalapatti violence
- 2016 Ariyalur gang rape case

== Bibliography ==
- Thirumaavalavan (2004). Uproot Hindutva : the fiery voice of the liberation panthers. Kolkata: Samya. ISBN 81-85604-79-7. OCLC 61247646.
