= Uthapuram caste wall =

Wall reportedly built for caste based segregation

The Uthapuram caste wall, also called the wall of shame or the wall of untouchability, is a 12 ft high and 600 meter long wall built by dominant caste villagers reportedly to segregate the Dalit population in the village of Uthapuram in Tamil Nadu. The village witnessed violence between Dalits and the dominant castes during 1948, 1964 and 1989 and was also known for its caste based discrimination.

Protests started in 2008 campaigning to demolish the wall, led mostly by the Communist Party of India and left-wing organizations. Later a small portion of the wall was demolished by the government to allow entry to the Dalits to access the main road. Many dominant caste villagers left the village and moved 3 km away with their belongings reportedly as a protest for demolishing the wall.

70 houses belonging to the Dalits were attacked in October 2008 reportedly in retaliation for the demolition of the wall and a Dalit man was shot dead by the police. Tensions continued until 2015, when during a clash between the communities several vehicles were set on fire and many were hospitalized.

== Background ==
=== Caste divisions and clashes ===
The village of Uthapuram in the Madurai district has two major castes, the dominant caste Vellala Pillaimar and the Dalit Pallar caste. The village was known for its caste tensions and there were violent conflicts between the castes during the years 1948, 1964 and 1989.

=== Caste discrimination ===
The dominant caste villagers reportedly blocked attempts of the Dalits to build a bus stop and increased the elevation of a parapet close to the bus stop to discourage the Dalits from sitting before them. The tea-shops managed by caste Hindus are not visited by the Dalits. The Dalits are not permitted to enter a dominant caste-dominated streets and are refused space in the community halls and in the village squares and were also denied entry to burial sites.

=== The wall ===
The wall which was 600 meters long and 12 ft high was described in variously as a caste wall, a wall of shame, a wall of bias and a wall of untouchability, was built by caste-Hindus in 1989 after a caste violence in the village. The passes through areas intended for common use by members of all the castes. It also barred Dalits from directly entering the main road. Dalits have to use a circular path and walk a some more miles to get to the main road.

== Clashes and protests in 2008 ==
The fourth conflict began in 2008 after a period of 20 years, and kept going in numerous ways for another 5 years. It began in April 2008 when the caste Hindus used iron rods to electrify the 600 meter wall to prevent the Dalits from entering into the dominant caste areas during night times. Initially, the Dalits were hesitant to contend but the Tamil Nadu Untouchability Eradication Front (TNUEF), Communist Party of India (Marxist) (CPM), Communist Party of India (CPI) and All India Democratic Women's Association (AIDWA) opposed this action by the dominant caste villagers vigorously. A member of the TNUEF alleged that two cows were electrocuted by the electrified wall. Following the state-wide protests of the progressive organisations, the electricity minister of Tamil Nadu called for the removal of the power line. The CPI(M) along with local Dalits started a campaign for the destruction of the caste wall. The Dalits orchestrated a demonstration at the front of the Taluk office calling for the wall to be pulled down. The CPI(M)'s general secretary, N. Varadarajan said that his party cadre will demolish the wall on their own if the government did not take any actions.

== Demolition ==
On 6 May, the district administration got involved and destroyed a 15-foot portion of the wall to allow the Dalits to travel in the presence of a few hundred policemen and the supervision of the district officials. In an act of protest, some caste Hindus returned their ration cards to the Tehsildar. About 600 dominant caste members left the village during the demolition and moved to Thalaiyoothu, a place 3 km from the village with their livestock and declared that they would not return.

The problem became tense again when the dominant caste villagers who left the village didn't listen to a request from the District Collector to come back soon so that everyone in the village can live in peace. When district officials met with them, they made several demands including a patta for a temple where they had been worshiping for more than 400 years, a permanent police outpost in the village, and new housing for people whose residences which they claimed were destroyed by Dalit anti-socials during the riots of 1989.

At Thalaiyoothu on May 12, The leader of the village's dominant caste group, told Frontline that his people left the village more out of panic than as a mark of rebellion. After the wall was taken down, he said they felt insecure. He claimed the Dalits live better now with most of them having government jobs or being land owners. He also claimed that since the Dalits were actually on a buying spree and the dominant caste members fear that they might be forced to sell their property to Dalits. He also claimed that the wall was built to protect the dominant caste villagers. However this version is not accepted by the village's Dalits. They assert they were at the receiving side of hostility, instead of the other way around.

== Attacks ==
On 1 October 2008, more than 70 Dalits houses were attacked as a response to the destruction of the wall and a Dalit youth was shot dead by the police as a result of the tensions on November 4, 2008.

== Continued tensions ==
On 10 November 2011, several Dalits entered a temple controlled by dominant caste with police protection. Although several dominant caste members welcomed them with folded arms, there were women crying in the streets opposing their entry. In 2012, the Dalits were not allowed to participate in the temple's consecration ceremony and in 2013 the Dalits did not attend the temple festivals. In April 2014, the dominant caste villagers locked the temple and left the village opposing the High court order for allowing the Dalits for Temple entry.

In October 2015, the Dalits and the dominant caste villagers clashed during a temple festival which started over a dispute over placing a garland over a tree. Six motor-bikes were set ablaze and the tehsildars vehicle was also damaged. The police filed cases on 70 people belonging to both the castes and arrested 21. Several injured during the clashes were hospitalized.
