= 2015 Seshasamudram violence =

Violence against Dalit community

The 2015 Seshasamudram violence also known as the Villupuram violence refers to the violence that took place on 15 August 2015 in Seshasmudram, a village in Sankarapuram Taluk, Viluppuram District, Tamil Nadu. A crowd of 500 dominant-caste villagers attacked a Dalit colony over a dispute over a procession of a temple car. 15 houses belonging to the Dalits were burnt down and 40 Dalits were injured during the violence.

== Background ==
In the village, there were 2000 Vanniyar families and 75 Dalit families.

=== Festival tensions ===
The Dalits were denied entry to at least 5 temples controlled by the Vanniyars. The Dalit community constructed a Mariamman temple in the village and for four years, they were refused permission to conduct a procession by the local administration as it was opposed by the Vanniyars and that it could also cause tensions in the village.

The Dalits threatened to accept Buddhism if they were not permitted to take the car out in 2015. Peace committee meetings were held by the Villupuram district administration, attended by a 100 members from Vanniyar community and 5 members from the Dalit colony, and it was agreed that Dalits will be allowed to conduct the procession.

In the year 2015, The Dalit colony's Mariamman temple car festival was planned for August 16. Following 2012, when the temple car was constructed, policemen have been posted regularly in the village. While the whole Dalit colony was involved in the arrangements, the Vanniyars, mainly young people, departed for the neighboring town of Kallakurichi, where Anbumani Ramadoss, one of the leaders of the Pattali Makkal Katchi (PMK), was taking part in a demonstration.

== Attacks ==
The attacks began at 8:30 pm on August 15 on Independence day. Police stated that even after the peace negotiations, a group of Vanniyars dug up the route to block the temple car procession. The mob of 100, including women, began hurling stones on the police when they tried to stop the mob and threw petrol bombs at the temple vehicle, burning it. Police claimed that this attack was made by the Vanniyars returning from the demonstration held by the PMK.

A mob of 500 people armed with crow bars, stones, sticks, sickles and petrol filled bottles reached the Dalit colony. They took positions on the rooftops watching over the colony at the same time. By vandalizing the transformer in the area, the mob had turned off power supply. When the lights went out, they hurled petrol bombs and stones from the rooftops into the colony. Another party stormed in the colony and quickly smashed the tube lights and the bulbs. Then they burned huts and properties after discovering nobody there. Then the group attacked the badly outnumbered policemen, who attempted to stop the attackers. The police team had relocated the Dalits to the fields and told them to stay there before backup reached the village. Some of the policemen also suffered injuries. At least 15 houses were burned down and about 40 Dalit people were injured. 8 police officers and 3 village assistants were also injured. Vehicles of Dalit families were also burned by the mob. The police discovered that half a dozen goats were killed. During their attack the mob also shouted "Burn them! No Paraiyars should be let off". Many of the Dalits lost money, jewels and their bona fide records.

The police had to shoot in the air several times to enter, as the Vanniyars blocked the policemen to go through their area to enter the Dalit colony. It eventually took a rain that lasted almost an hour to extinguish the fire.

In September 2015, a house belonging to a Vanniyar were set on fire. A local source said it was an accident, not an act of retribution. Later, 2 Dalit houses were again torched in September with petrol bombs, the victims claimed that their houses were burned when they spoke to the media about the recent violence.

== Investigations ==
A human rights organization based in Madurai named Evidence, claimed a number of Dalit women had been abused in the attack. They had been stripped and told to run away, abandoning their children in the house. The riots which started on 8:30pm was reported to have continued until early in the morning of the next day.

As per police reports and residents, in the countdown of the 2012 panchayat election, a Vanniyar contestant named Subramanian pledged to help the Dalit community to buy a temple car in an effort to attract the Dalit vote. He helped them buy the car after winning by collecting funds and using the money of the Dalits. Vanniyars objected taking the car through the streets where they lived. Local officials refused permission for the procession for the past three years as they were unable to solve the issue. The district magistrate granted permission on 2015 to the Dalits being unable to withhold approval forever.

After the violence, the police arrested and jailed Subramanian for being responsible for the riots and jailed him in Vellore central prison. Local news sources stated that Subramanian of the Desiya Murpokku Dravida Kazhagam disrupted the villagers unity by inciting a caste clash between both the communities. Subramani confessed that other than him, over 100 Vanniyar men were preparing an attack together.

== Arrests ==
85 people, including 18 women and seven minors, all from the Vanniyar caste, were detained by police. Two more people were later arrested.

== Reactions ==
The PMK founder, S. Ramadoss, accused the police for the violence.

The Tamil Nadu Untouchability Eradication Front asked the NHRC to start using its legal power to prosecute those responsible for the violence.

Chief Minister J Jayalalithaa provided financial aid of ₹ 50,000 each to 8 police officers and 3 village assistants who were injured.

Over 1000 Viduthalai Chiruthaigal Katchi (VCK) members blocked the Tiruvannamalai Road at Sankarapuram, demanding action against those responsible for the violence.

Marumalarchi Dravida Munnetra Kazhagam (MDMK) chief Vaiko denounced the burning of the Dalits Temple Car and Houses and pleaded to the members of both groups to live in peace.

The president of Puthiya Tamilagam party, K. Krishnasamy has demanded tough action against those involved in the violence.

The Manithaneya Makkal Katchi appealed to all members of both the communities to aim for harmony.
