= 2004 Kalapatti violence =

Anti-Dalit Violence in Kalapatti, Tamil Nadu

The 2004 Kalapatti violence refers to the violence against Dalits by dominant-caste villagers in the village of Kalapatti, Tamil Nadu on 16 May 2004. About 100 Dalit houses have been burned down by a mob of 200 villagers and Dalits who attempted to escape were attacked. The attacks lasted for 2 hours and 14 people were seriously injured in the violence including a man's arm reportedly hacked off.

Tensions reportedly started after Dalits in the village boycotted the 2004 Lok Sabha election as a protest because some of their grievances remained unattended. This is said to have angered the dominant caste villagers and also the Bharatiya Janata Party (BJP) workers when the dalits remained unconcerned during the BJP general secretary's visit to the village. Other incidents include an attack against a Dalit youth who was pasting posters to celebrate Dr. Ambedkar's birthday and an altercation between Dalit youths and the dominant-caste men in an auto-rickshaw.

The attacks started after the loss of BJP's state general secretary in the polls. The United states Bureau of Democracy, Human Rights, and Labor reported that the attackers blamed the loss of their candidate on the Dalits. Thol. Thirumavalavan, leaders of political parties CPI and CPM blamed the BJP for the violence.

== Background ==
The village of Kalapatti is situated in the district of Coimbatore, the village comprised 2,000 families of the Gounder caste, the politically and economically powerful caste in the village. The Dalit settlement comprised 250 families belonging to the Arunthathiyar caste.

=== Caste discrimination ===
The World Organisation Against Torture reported the members of the Dalit community in the village were not allowed to walk in the streets belonging to the dominant caste members, not allowed entry inside the village Mariamman temple and were not allowed to walk in the streets talking among themselves. Casteist slurs and intimidation were often used against the Dalits and they were forced to lower their heads in public to punctuate their lower status. Dalit women were often subjected to sexual assaults and harassment. Dalits also had to use separate glasses in tea shops.

=== Election boycott ===
During the 2004 Indian general election, the Dalits in the village announced that they would boycott the elections as a protest because many of their problems remained unconsidered. One of their key demands of the Dalit community is their entry into the common village temple which had been opposed by caste-Hindus for years. Nothing could be done about it by the State Government or Sangh Parivar, which exerted significant influence over the Dalits in the region. However, the Dalits were resistant on their resolution to boycott the polls. It is reported that when the Bharatiya Janata Party's state president visited the village, the Dalits remained unconcerned which angered the BJP cadres. The local dominant caste members were also opposed to the boycott decision of the Dalit community. The BJP candidate C.P Radhakrishnan lost the polls to K Subbarayan of the Communist party of India. K. Subbarayan who also belong to the dominant Gounder caste didn’t come to the village to campaign or give a hearing to the villagers’ grievances.

=== Incidents preceding the violence ===
A Dalit youth was attacked on 14 May by some men from the Gounder caste when he was pasting posters to celebrate the birthday of Dr. Babasaheb Ambedkar. On 15 May, a group of Dalit youth who traveled with a group of Gounder men in an auto rickshaw were allegedly verbally abused them in derogatory words because the Dalit youth were enjoying themselves in front of the dominant caste men and slapped one of them after getting out of the rickshaw. The Dalit youth who went to the Kovilpalayam Police to complaint about the incident but the police men took no action and allegedly told the youth to leave out statements mentioning the use of derogatory language by the attackers but when the Dalit youth included everything in the complaint, the police did not register the complaint. Although, this incident was believed to be the immediate cause for the assault, the underlying cause is assumed to be the growing fear of the development of Dalits in the village due to the active position played by certain Dalit organisations.

== Attacks ==
The attack occurred on 16 May 2004 within the fortnight of the elections in the Dalit localities of New Colony and Shastri Nagar in the Kalapatti village by 200 Gounder -caste villagers, armed with swords, iron rods and other weapons. They ransacked about 100 homes and damaged the household items and television sets. When the Dalits ran for their safety, they were attacked with sickles, iron rods, long sticks and knives. The attacks lasted for two hours and 14 people including a 75 year old man were seriously injured and were hospitalized. Several women were allegedly sexually assaulted and the attackers used derogatory language against them during the attacks. The attackers also set fire to cattle sheds, bikes and the Dalit temples, a man's hand was cut off during the attack. It is reported that 100 homes were completely burned and were razed to the ground, some of the attackers molested the Dalit women and also looted jewelry and money from the houses.

As per the 2005 annual report of United Nations special rapporteur on Racism, the dominant caste villagers forced the Dalits to the ground and stomped on them using derogatory caste terms against them. The saris of the Dalit women were stripped off. In other cases, an 8-month-old infant was thrown against a wall, a 75-year-old man was assaulted, and a middle-aged woman was struck in her head while she attempted to defend her son. Almost 100 homes were burned down and cattle belonging to the Dalits were also killed.

The offices of the Adhi Thamizhar Viduthalai Munnani were among the places attacked. A photo of the B.R. Ambedkar is reported to have been burned down. University and School certificates and land pattas have been burnt according to the reports of a number of fact-finding committees, such as the People's Watch-Tamil Nadu, the Tamil Nadu Division of the People's Congress for Civil Liberties and the Dalit Human Rights Monitoring. As per the reports of these teams, the attackers had not even spared the cattle belonging to the Dalit people.

Many Dalits of the village of Kalapatti escaped to neighboring villages out of fear. The Government allotted ₹ 20 lakh for relief work to the Dalits, but only ₹ 2,42,000 was granted as immediate remuneration. Despite this, there were reports that the Dalits have been forced by the police to conceal the burning items and are trying to mitigate the extent of the atrocities.

== Arrests ==
The cops detained 54 people and filed cases on them under the Scheduled Castes and Scheduled Tribes Act on Atrocities and Indian Penal Code. The research teams, argued that the police appeared on the scene only after 2.5 hours after the attack, while the closest police station is inside 7 kilo-meters of the village but some Dalit youths had made complaints to the police when the mob was on the attack.

== Investigations ==
The United states Bureau of Democracy, Human Rights, and Labor published that the dominant caste members blamed the Dalits for the loss of their candidate and reportedly committed the violence.

The local villagers alleged that C.P Radhakrishnan, the then general secretary of the BJP threatened to "deal with them later" for boycotting the elections. Dalit leader, Thol. Thirumavalavan, who visited the village after the violence, accused the Bharatiya Janata Party for the violence. The Communist Party of India (Marxist) and Communist Party of India (CPI) members also accused the BJP and called for the arrest of all those implicated in the crime and the payment of compensations to those affected in the attacks.

Hindutva factions have been using Arunthathiyar youngsters to commit violent activities in and outside of Coimbatore until the attacks. Dalit leaders said the tragedy only demonstrates that the Sangh Parivar, which is evidently continuing to lose its grip on the Arunthathiyars, as indicated by the choice of the Dalits to boycott the polls in which the BJP tried to preserve its seat.

== See also ==
- 2018 Ambalapattu violence
- 1997 Melavalavu massacre
- 2012 Dharmapuri violence
- 2019 Ponparappi violence
- 2015 Seshasamudram violence

== Bibliography ==
- HRW (2007). Hidden Apartheid Caste Discrimination against India's "Untouchables". Human Rights Watch.
- CRHRP (2004). Country Reports on Human Rights Practices. U.S. Government Printing Office: Michigan State University.
- Sadangi, Himansu Charan (2008). Dalit : the downtrodden of India. Delhi: Gyan Publishing House. ISBN 81-8205-439-7. OCLC 244768679.
