= Uthapuram =

Village in Madurai district, Tamil Nadu, India

Coordinates: 9.52°N 77.42°E

Uthapuram is a village in Madurai district, Tamil Nadu, India. It is known for a wall which segregated Dalits from the village for two decades.

== Geography and demographics ==
Uthapuram is located in Peraiyur taluk of Madurai district. It is 41 kilometers away from the district capital Madurai. As of census 2011, it has population of 5149 of which scheduled caste consists 2172. It comes under the Usilampatti assembly constituency and Theni parliamentary constituency.

== Uthapuram wall ==
The village have two major communities, one is dominant caste Hindu vellala Pillaimar another one is scheduled caste Dalit Pallar community. The caste violence occurred occasionally between these communities. The violence happened in 1948, 1964 and 1989. After 1989 violence caste Hindus constructed a 30 meter long wall to segregate Dalits from the village. The wall later described as "wall of untouchability". The Dalits were not allowed to enter the streets of caste Hindus. Following this, Tamil Nadu Untouchability Eradication Front (TNUEF) of Communist Party of India (Marxist) and Dalit organizations protested against the construction of the wall. The caste Hindus argued that the wall was built on the private land. In May 2008, Madurai district administration demolished the wall and allowed the Dalits into the village. After demolition, violence occurred between the communities. The caste Hindus threatened that they would leave the village. To control the situation police opened fire in that one person died. The cases were filed against the incident. In 2012, Madras High Court ordered compensation to the people who suffered during the violence.

The district administration initiated the peace agreement between the communities. Therefore, the Dalits were allowed to enter local Muthalamman-Mariamman temple who prevented since 1989.

== See also ==
- Uthapuram caste wall
- Separation barrier
