= Udumalai Shankar murder case =

Murder in the Indian state of Tamil Nadu

Murder of Udumalai Shankar
- Date: 13 March 2016
- Time: 14:05-14:15 IST (08:40 UTC)
- Location: Udumalaipettai, Tiruppur, Tamil Nadu, India
- Type: Murder, Honor killing
- Cause: Inter-caste marriage
- Convicted: P. Jagatheesan, M. Manikandan, P. Selvakumar, P. Kalaithamilvaanan and M. Mathan
- Convictions: Murder
- Sentence: Life imprisonment not less than 25 years

The Shankar murder case is a very prominent case in the South Indian state of Tamil Nadu. Kousalya, an Engineering student from the dominant Thevar community married Sankar Velusamy, who studied in the same college. Shankar belonged to the Dalit community. The pair were married for 8 months when they both were attacked in broad daylight on 13 March 2016 near the Udumalaipet Town Bustand by a gang of three armed men. While Sankar died on the spot, Kousalya sustained injuries but survived. The sessions court sentenced six people including Chinnaswamy, the father of Kousalya to death. The court found it to be a case of honour killing by the father of Kousalya, who married a 'lower' caste man against his wishes. The Court also ordered a compensation of ₹11.95 lakhs to be equally split between Kousalya and Velusamy, Sankar's father.

Chinnaswamy was later acquitted by the Madras High Court, for want of evidence. The five others who were earlier sentenced to death also had their sentence reduced to a life term of 25 years.

The case had significant political impact and brought to light the occurrence of 'honour' killing in the state. The case was the second in terms of most number of death sentences in a single case. The heinous crime was not condemned by the major state parties considering the vote bank of the Thevar community and the upcoming 2016 Assembly elections.

== Background ==
Kousalya is the daughter of a Chinnaswamy and Annalakshmi who belonged to the Thevar, a caste with significant economic and political clout. The family lived in Udumalaipettai, a town in the Tiruppur district in the South Indian state of Tamil Nadu. Kousalya was attending an Engineering college in Pollachi. Sankar was a Dalit who was studying in the same college. There was strong opposition from Kousalya's family to the love as he belonged to a 'lower' community. Kousalya decided to move away from her home and get married. The pair got married in spite of opposition from the girl's family and started living in Sankar's house. Kousalya quit her college and started working in tiles factory to support the education of Sankar.

On 13 March 2016, the pair went to the market in the town to buy a shirt for the annual day celebration in Sankar's college. The pair was attacked by a gang of six armed men near the Town Busstand in Udumalaipet. The men who came on bike started attacking Sankar with their sickles till he collapsed. They then turned on to Kousalya and attacked her. Sankar lost his life on the spot, while Kousalya was grievously injured. The police conducted an identification parade and identified all the killers. The whole incident was captured in CCTV (Closed Circuit Television) camera in the opposite shop.

== Court proceedings ==
The case was conducted in Tiruppur district court from 2016. The prosecution produced B. Chinnasamy, father of Kousalya as chief conspirator (A1), Annalakshmi, the mother of Kousalya as co-conspirator (A2), Pandithurai, Kousalya's uncle as co-conspirator (A3), Jegadesan, a friend of Chinnaswamy as mastermind (A4), Manikandan alias Palani for hiring the hitmen (A5), Selvakumar as a family friend & executor (A6), Kalaitamilvaanan, a member of the gang (A7), and Mathan alias Michael and a member of gang (A8). There were four other produced as police as gangmen namely Madan, K. Dhanraj, V. Prasanna and Manikandan. The prosecution accused Chinnaswamy, Kousalya's father for abetting and coorabrating the murder. Based on the arguments and the documentary and video evidence produced, the court pronounced the sentence on 12 December 2017. The court sentenced Chinnaswamy and five others namely, Jegadeesan, Manikandan, Selvakumar, Kalai Tamilvaanan and Madan to death sentence, K.Dhanraj to life sentence and one another to five year imprisonment. The Justice J Alamelu Natarajan acquitted Kousalya's mother, who was also accused in the prosecution. The Court also ordered a compensation of ₹11.95 lakhs from the perpetrators as a compensation to be equally split between Kousalya and Velusamy, Sankar's father. The case was the second in terms of most number of death sentences in a single case.

The sentenced challenged the judgement in the High court of Tamil Nadu against the appeal. The state also appealed to the High Court against releasing Kousalya's mother and other accused who were not sentenced. The appeal was taken up by the Madras High Court. On 22 June 2020, the court pronounced the verdict. It acquitted Chinnaswamy and reduced the sentence of five others to life sentence. The court relieved two others, the person who was sentenced to life and one another who was sentenced to five years. In its 367-page judgement, the Justice M Sathyanarayanan and Justice M Nirmal Kumar quoted five major reasons for the sentence based on the submission made by the police and Additional Advocate General C Emilias. There was no evidence that the amount of ₹80,000 from the joint account of Chinaswamy & Annalakshmi during 12–14 February 2016 was given to A4-A6. Secondly, there was no evidence to prove that Chinnaswamy booked room in the hotel, nor for the stay of A4, A5 and A8 in the quoted days in the hotel Bakya Mahal. The account of the eyewitness to having seen A4-A6 along with Chinnaswamy was not proven. Kousalya made a police complaint after her marriage that she was forcibly taken away by her parents and her Thali was removed. She withdrew the complaint later when she returned to Shankar and mentioned that no action be taken against her parents. Though there were phone records during the days between 5-Feb-16 to 2-Mar-16 between Chinnaswamy and A4-8, the other evidences were not sufficient to prove beyond doubt that Chinnawamy orchestrated the murder. After the appeal Kousalya accused the prosecution of misguiding her that her mother would also be punished, but the sentence ended up relieving her father. She mentioned that she would appeal against the verdict in the Supreme Court of India.

== Political impact ==
The case was a case study for honour killing in Tamil Nadu even in modern times. Thevar is a strong community in the state. The heinous crime was not condemned by the major state parties considering the vote bank of the community and the upcoming 2016 Assembly elections. There was furore in social media and media over the incidence of honour killing. Most of the Dalit parties condemened the incident. A few days after the Session court's judgement, Kousalya questioned the stance of M.K. Stalin, the leader of Dravida Munnetra Kazhagam. She opened quoted "“Let’s take MK Stalin’s condemnation of Sankar’s murder. In that, instead of talking about the truth of why Sankar died or why I was attacked, he simply said it was a murder. The reason for our attack was caste and what happened was an honour killing. He has proved that an opposition party leader can condemn(the incident) by hiding all this. Who does that condemnation save? Who does that condemnation ultimately benefit?”.

After the judgement of High Court that relieved the main conspirator B. Chinnaswamy and reduced the death sentence of others, K. Balakrishnan of the CPI (M) mentioned that the judgement would support such crimes in futures. Thol. Thirumavalavan, the leader of Viduthalai Chiruthaigal Katchi and also Kamal Haasan, the leader of Makkal Needhi Maiam condemned the judgement.

As per C Lakshmanan at the Madras Institute of Development Studies, there are nearly 150 cases of honour killing every year in the state. According to him and some of the experts, the state where the major parties claim opposition to caste based discrimination, such crimes are pretty prevalent.

== Aftermath ==
Velusamy, Shankar's father was given a government job by the government of Tamil Nadu in Udumalaipet as "solatium". Kousalaya went on to become a social activist. She started Sankar Social Justice Trust, which helps victims of caste murder and supports inter-caste marriages. Kousalya got married with Parai artist Sakthi of Nimirvu Kazhaiyagam in Coimbatore on 9 December 2018. The marriage was attended by Sankar's parents, but not by Kousalya's parents in spite of Sakthi belonging to their same community.

A documentary recording the views from various parties involved were shot in a documentary named India's forbidden Love. The documentary, telecast in Al Jazeera received critical acclaim and was nominated for International Emmy Awards in the Best Documentary category.

== Timeline ==
- 12 July 2015 - Kousalya (19) marries Sankar (22) against the wishes of her parents.
- 13 March 2016 - A gang of six with attacks the pair with Sankar getting murdered and Kousalya sustaining grievous injuries.
- 12 December 2017 - The Tiruppur district court sentences Chinnaswamy, Kousalya's father for abetting the murder. It also sentences five others Jegadeesan, Manikandan, Selvakumar, Kalai Tamilvaanan and Madan to death sentence, one to life sentence and one another to five year imprisonment. The court acquits Kousalya's mother.
- 2 February 2019 - Kousalya suspended from her government job in Wellington Cantonment Board (WCB) for making remarks against the constitution and sovereignty.
- 5 June 2019 - Kousalya suspension in Wellington Cantonment Board (WCB) revoked after she apologizes.
- 22 June 2020 - The Madras High Court acquits Chinnaswamy and reduces the sentence of five others to life sentence. The court relieves two others, the person who was sentenced to life and one another who was sentenced to five years.
