= Ponparappi =

- Village
- Location in Tamil Nadu, India Ponparappi (India)
- Coordinates: 11.271°N 79.241°E
- Country: India
- State: Tamil Nadu
- District: Ariyalur

Population (2001)
  - Total: 4,614

Languages
  - Official: Tamil
- Time zone: UTC+5:30 (IST)
- PIN: 621710
- Vehicle registration: TN-
- Coastline: 0 kilometres (0 mi)
- Nearest city: Jayankondam
- Sex ratio: 1006 ♂/♀
- Literacy: 75.79%
- Climate: hot (Köppen)

Ponparappi is a village in the Sendurai taluk of Ariyalur district, Tamil Nadu, India.

== Demographics ==
As per the 2001 census, Ponparappi had a total population of 4,614 with 2,300 males and 2,314 females.
