= Kodukkur =

- village
- Location in Tamil Nadu, India Kodukkur (India)
- Coordinates: 12°01′N 79°39′E
- Country: India
- State: Tamil Nadu
- District: Villupuram

Population (2001)
  - Total: 3,023

Languages
  - Official: Tamil
- Time zone: UTC+5:30 (IST)
- Postal code: 605501
- Vehicle registration: TN-
- Coastline: 0 kilometres (0 mi)
- Sex ratio: 986 ♂/♀
- Literacy: 63.62%

Kodukkur is a village in the vanur taluk of Villupuram district, Tamil Nadu, India.It is near to Pondicherry.

== Demographics ==
As per the 2001 census, Kodukkur had a total population of 3023 with 1522 males and 1501 females.
