= Irumbilikurichi =

Irumbulikurichi
- village
- Country: India
- State: Tamil Nadu
- District: Ariyalur

Population (2001)
  - Total: 3,386

Languages
  - Official: Tamil
- Time zone: UTC+5:30 (IST)
- Vehicle registration: TN-
- Coastline: 0 kilometres (0 mi)
- Sex ratio: 994 ♂/♀
- Literacy: 60.07%

Irumbulikurichi is a village in the Sendurai taluk of Ariyalur district, Tamil Nadu, India.

== Demographics ==
As per the 2001 census, Irumbulikurichi had a total population of 3386 with 1698 males and 1688 females.
