= 2012 Dharmapuri violence =

Caste related violence against Dalits in Tamil Nadu

- Caste-related violence against Dalits
- Date: 7 November 2012
- Location: Dharmapuri district, Tamil Nadu
- Caused by: Caste tensions
- Methods: Arson, vandalism, looting

Casualties
- Arrested: 142
- Damage: 268 Dalit houses set on fire; 1500+ people left homeless

In the 2012 Dharmapuri violence, a Vanniyar caste mob set fire to about 268 Dalit houses in Natham, old and new Kondampatti and Annanagar Dalit colonies in Dharmapuri district, Tamil Nadu on 8 November 2012. The violence occurred after a Vanniyar girl from Sellankottai village, and a Dalit boy, from the neighbouring Dalit colony of Natham, eloped due to parental opposition against their marriage. A caste panchayat held on the morning of 7 November by leaders from both communities ruled that the girl be returned to her family. Distraught at her decision to stay with her husband, her father allegedly committed suicide. The discovery of his body later that day is said to have provoked a 1,500-strong mob to rampage through Natham and two smaller Dalit settlements, Kondampatti and Anna Nagar, where it set ablaze over 200 houses, damaged at least 50 others, and allegedly looted valuables and cash worth lakhs of rupees. The mob rampaged for four hours and was brought under control after arrest of 90 men and an additional deployment of 1000 policemen.

While Ramadoss, belonging to Vanniyar political outfit Pattali Makkal Katchi (PMK), had rubbished allegations that his party orchestrated the incident, many Dalits believe otherwise. His party is said to have fomented tension between Vanniyars and Dalits by publicly condemning marriages between the two.

Many of the victims had blamed the fecklessness of the police and the district administration as this was a planned incident where a caste mob had been mobilised from 22 neighbouring villages. Though around 300 policemen were present on the spot anticipating trouble, they failed to control the violent gathering as the mob was eight times higher than the number of deployed forces. The Sub-inspector of Police, belonging to same caste of boy, and the constables responsible for maintaining peace in the area have since been transferred or suspended.

The National Commission for Scheduled Castes (NCSC) described the attack as well- organized and pre-planned.

== Background ==
The Vanniyars are an intermediate caste dominant in northern Tamil Nadu and form 12-13% of the state's population. The Adi Dravidar community, formerly called Paraiyars, make up approximately half of the state's Dalit population and form around 10% of the state's population. Dharmapuri had been a stronghold of the Naxalite movement until the early 2000s, and the Communists and other Leftist groups encouraged a solidarity between different communities and ensured casteism was significantly reduced. With the collapse of Naxalism, the people, once monolithic in their opposition to untouchability and discrimination, were now lured by caste identities and the promise of power. Thus began an era where Dalits were made vulnerable by radicalised groups and Vanniyars turned sanctimonious about their perceived position in society. This inevitably led to clashes between the communities. These caste attitudes were strengthened by politicians, especially those of Vanniyar political outfit PMK. In April 2012, PMK MLA, Kaduvetti Guru incited caste fanaticism when he asked the members of community to kill non-Vanniyar men who marry Vanniyar women at a Vanniyar youth meeting held in Mamallapuram.

Caste conflicts were present years before the violence in the Dharmapuri district. Although the Kondampatti village of Dharmapuri district is a panchayat village, the Dalits have access to the panchayat office, ration, schools in the nearby Vanniyar village of Puliyampatti. Dalits have access to the goods in these shops only after the Vanniyars had purchased. If anyone defiles these rules, they are beaten up and abused. There were several reports about Dalit women beaten up but no action was taken by the police despite lodged complaints.

== Incident ==
The unrest was sparked with the eloping of 20 year-old Divya, a Vanniyar from Sellankottai village, with 19 year-old E. Ilavarasan, a Dalit from the neighbouring Natham colony. Both were college students, and had been in a relationship for a long time. Their relationship was known to Ilavarasan's parents for at least a year before their elopement. The couple fled from the area when their parents opposed the marriage, and got married in a Salem temple on 12 October 2012. After their flight, Ilavarasan's parents fled too, fearing an outburst of violence from the Vanniyars. Two weeks later, on 7 November, a caste panchayat of both communities was gathered, in which the couple were ordered to come home. When they refused, many Vanniyar community members taunted Divya's father, G. Nagaraj, for bringing "shame" to the community. Facing humiliation and distraught over the refusal of his daughter to return, he hanged himself on the same evening.

His body was discovered the next day. For his funeral, Vanniyars from 22 other villages had gathered. That afternoon, a 1500-strong Vanniayar mob marched towards the Natham colony, bearing Nagaraj's body, shouting caste slogans and cutting trees to block the Tirupattur highway. At the time, most of the Dalit men, who were daily-wagers in Coimbatore and Bangalore, were away, and the women and children that were there fled into nearby fields. Around 4:30, the mob charged into Natham bearing petrol and weapons. They looted every house, and torched many of them. The mob then moved on to Anna Nagar, 1.5 km away, and repeated the process while shouting obscenities. 36 out of 50 houses in the colony were set on fire. In Kodampatti, the mob was able to torch 14 houses but broke apart when a police team arrived. The head of the Sellankottai village claimed the villagers of Sellankottai had nothing to do with the violence.

The attack was reportedly organized by Vanniyar leaders to teach the Dalits who were upwardly mobile a lesson.

== Damages ==
As many as 268 homes of Dalits (of the Adi Dravida community) near Naikkankottai in Dharmapuri district were torched by the higher-caste group. 50 bikes and 4 vans were also burned in the violence.

The victims have alleged that ‘systematic destruction’ of their properties and livelihood resources has taken place. Around 1500 who were homeless after the incident were put up in a ground nearby and were provided food and clothing and also sanctioned Rs 50,000 as relief from Tamil Nadu Chief Minister's Relief Fund. The affected people staged a fast demanding Chief Minister to visit the affected areas and to increase compensation.

== Aftermath ==
The Vanniyar Sangam organized a meeting to form a broader anti-Dalit front after the violence, only 12 among the expected 500 turned up for the event which was then quietly called off.

Ramadoss created the "All Communities Federation," a nine-member front representing intermediary castes. The PMK leaders said that Dalit youngsters dressed in jeans wearing T-shirts and sunglasses with their motorbikes and cell phones were wooing caste-Hindu girls into marriage. To expose these "farcical love marriages" the federation arranged public meetings in several areas.

== Reactions ==
- Members of National Commission for Scheduled Castes after visiting the colonies blamed the attitude of the state police for failing to control the violence and stated that rise in status of Dalits are not tolerated by dominant caste Hindus which results in incidents of violence. They also alleged that the violence was a well-organized and planned attack on Dalits and not a spontaneous anguish over a single incident of suicide.
- Viduthalai Chiruthaigal Katchi, a Dalit-based political party demanded a CBI probe into the incident as it did not have faith in local police inquiry. VCK president Thol. Thirumavalavan compared the incidents to 1990s Kodiyankulam violence where the main reason for the violence was upward mobility of Dalits in economic, educational, political fronts.
- Dravida Munnetra Kazhagam party constituted a fact finding committee came out with a report which stated

The attack was a planned one. Inter-caste love marriage was not the sole reason behind it. Rather, the attack was the result of a chain of events. The PMK functionaries are found to have instigated and carried out the attacks. While the police is yet to arrest all the culprits behind the attack, they have booked a few innocents who are not connected with the incident

It also blamed the state government for not taking enough steps to restore normalcy or implementing relief measures.

- Communist Party of India (Marxist) MLAs K. Balakrishnan, P. Dillibabu and K. Bheema Rao visited the affected people to console and provide relief materials. They told the attack which seem to be well planned could not be prevented because of Intelligence failure and failure to keep a check on Kangaroo courts and demanded police to take action against those responsible under SC-ST (Prevention of Atrocities) Act
- Bharatiya Janata Party in Tamil Nadu said that the government has failed to check increasing incidents of breakdown of law and order and the police are not given full power to deal with it.
- PMK founder S. Ramadoss claimed there were many 'staged love marriages' happening in the state where Dalit men lure Vanniyar women claiming to be in love and later duping them, ask for a ransom after marriage through Kangaroo courts. This was seen as a budding parallel to Love Jihad promoted by Hindutva groups. He also stated the mob that indulged in violence was cutting across castes / party lines unlike mentioned in sections of media / parties as mainly consisting of Vanniyar/PMK men. He also formed an alliance of caste Hindu organizations against Dalit assertion. asking for amendment to prevent the "misuse" of Scheduled Caste and Scheduled Tribe (Prevention of Atrocities) Act and a ban on intercaste marriages, which was opposed by VCK and Periyarist groups like Dravidar Kazhagam.

== Probe and court proceedings ==
The Tamil Nadu government transferred the probe from local police to Crime Branch CID. More than 90 persons were arrested and cases were filed against over 200 people. The Madras High Court has stated the incident as serious and instructed the state authorities to submit a status report and the counter affidavit on that date. A PIL was filed seeking the suspension of District collector and Superintendent of police for inaction. On 3 December 2012, The district collector told the court that adequate relief measures were provided to victims and steps have been taken to maintain law and order in the area. The Superintendent of Police said cases have been registered and 142 people have been arrested. High Court termed the relief insufficient and ordered the state to provide a relief of 7.32 crore. A fresh PIL was filed asking for effective monitoring of offenses under SC-ST act and transfer the probe to CBI. The petition was posted along with the other petitions in the case. Tamil Nadu govt then declared solatium to individuals were ready to the tune of 7.32 crore as per court order. On 9 February 2013, 91 people including some of whom who were falsely arrested for passing by near the violence area were let off and asked to appear before the CBCID. On 29 March, the high court gave bail to 28 accused in the case. No one was convicted.

== Ilavarasan's death ==
On 15 March 2013, Divya's mother filed a petition in the Madras Court claiming Ilavarasan had kidnapped her daughter. In June, Divya visited her mother and eventually decided to separate from Ilavarasan, which, according to her, was because of the lingering weight of her father's suicide. On 3 July, Divya declared she had "no more feelings" for Ilavarasan. The next day, his body was found on the Coimbatore railway track. Three days after his death, the Superintendent of Police ruled the death to be a suicide. Four days after the incident, the Jaylalitha-led AIADMK government set up a one-man commission led by Justice S. R. Singaravelu to determine the cause of Ilavarasan's death. On 28 June 2014, the police arrested four Dalits from Natham in the case, claiming to have found Naxalite pamphlets in their houses. Villagers claimed they had been forced to dig a grave at the spot where his body was found. In November 2016, a CID report claimed he committed suicide while drunk, a claim strongly rejected by Ilavarasan's family. The Singaravelu commission delivered its report in 2019 claiming his death was caused by him jumping onto the railway tracks in depression, and being hit by a passing train. However, the commission's findings were against contested by Ilavarasan's family and social activists, who continued to suspect Ilavarasan's death was an "Arrogance" killing. In particular, one forensic pathologist who examined his body thought the injuries present were too few to have been causing by hitting a train.

== See also ==
- Dalit
- 2004 Kalapatti violence
