= Tamil Nadu Untouchability Eradication Front =

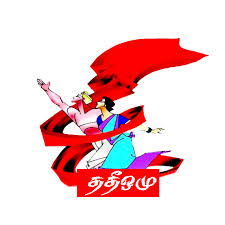
- President: T.CHELLAKANNU
- General Secretary: P Suganthi
- Treasurer: E.MOHANA
- Website: http://tnuef.com

Tamil Nadu Untouchability Eradication Front (TNUEF) is one of the organisations of the Communist Party of India (Marxist). It works to eradicate the untouchability and other forms of caste oppression. It was the key organisation which worked in razing the untouchability wall at Uthapuram.

== Activism ==
In 2019, the Tamil Nadu Untouchability Eradication Front protested against an iron fence which blocked the pathway mostly used by Dalits in the Alagumalai village in Tiruppur district for drinking water, their children's education and to reach their homes. The fence forced them to walk about 2 km for drinking water. The fence which also compounded a temple was raised on the instructions of the Hindu Munnani, a Sangh Parivar outfit. Later the part of the fence which blocked the road was removed on the orders of the sub-collector due to the protests. The TNUEF welcomed the move and postponed their protests to remove the entire fence. The Hindu Munnani protested against the Sub-collector for unblocking the pathway.

In June 2019, The TNUEF protested demanding the demolition of an ‘Untouchability Wall’ which blocked the dalits in Ambedkar Nagar, Vellore district to access a temple where they have worshipped for 150 years.

In October 2019, the TNUEF protested to take action against a builder who put up a 'Brahmins only' advertisement for apartments on sale for an upcoming residential project at Srirangam.The TNUEF District Secretary said the ad will further deepen religion and caste divide already widespread in the society.
