= Vetriyur =

Vetriyur may refer to:

- Vetriyur, Ariyalur
- Vetriyur, Sivaganga
