= Vetriyur, Sivaganga =

Vetriyur
- Village
- Location in Tamil Nadu, India
- Coordinates: 9.91°N 78.67°E
- Country: India
- State: Tamil Nadu
- District: Sivaganga

Government
  - Type: Town panchayat
- Elevation: 75 m (246 ft)

Population (2011)
  - Total: 1,411

Languages
  - Official: Tamil
- Time zone: UTC+5:30 (IST)
- Nearest city: Sivaganga

Vetriyur is a village in Sivaganga district in the Indian state of Tamil Nadu.

== Geography ==
Vetriyur is located at 9.87°N 78.67°E. The mean elevation is 75 metres.

== Demographics ==
As of the 2011 census, the total population was 1411. 45% of the population are men and 55% are woman.

== Education ==
Bala Bharatha Primary School was established in 1946. Government Higher Secondary School is a co-educational school in Vetriyur that was established in 1977.
