= Vetriyur, Ariyalur =

Vetriyur
- Village
- Location in Tamil Nadu, India
- Coordinates: 10.99°N 79.08°E
- Country: India
- State: Tamil Nadu
- District: Ariyalur

Government
  - Type: Town panchayat
- Elevation: 41 m (135 ft)

Population (2011)
  - Total: 5,290

Languages
  - Official: Tamil
- Time zone: UTC+5:30 (IST)
- Nearest city: Ariyalur

Vetriyur (or Vettriyur) is a village in Ariyalur district in the Indian state of Tamil Nadu.

== History ==
The cleanliness and safety of the village and nearby areas came into question due to various recent events.

In 2023, it was reported that the drinking water was contaminated with algae due to infrequent cleaning similar to other villages of Ariyalur district.

In 2024, twelve people died in a firecracker manufacturing unit explosion that was located in between Vetriyur and Viragalur. Then-chief minister M. K. Stalin Rs 50 thousand-Rs 3 lakh will be given to affected individuals.
