= Kovil Esanai =

Kovil Esanai may refer to:

- Kovil Esanai (East), a village in Tamil Nadu, India
- Kovil Esanai (West), a village in Tamil Nadu, India
