= Kovil Esanai (West) =

- village
- Ponnar vilagam
- Country: India
- State: Tamil Nadu
- District: Ariyalur

Population (2001)
  - Total: 1,645

Languages
  - Official: Tamil
- Time zone: UTC+5:30 (IST)
- Vehicle registration: TN-61
- Coastline: 0 kilometres (0 mi)
- Sex ratio: 1080 ♂/♀
- Literacy: 76.78%

Kovil Esanai is a village in the Ariyalur taluk of Ariyalur district, Tamil Nadu, India.

== Demographics ==
As per the 2001 census, Kovil Esanai (West) had a total population of 1645 with 791 males and 854 females.
