= Zarqan (disambiguation) =

Zarqan is a city in Fars Province, Iran.

Zarqan or Zaraqan (Persian: زرقان), also rendered as Zaraghan or Zarghan, may refer to:

- Zarghan, East Azerbaijan
- Zaraqan, Hamadan
- Zarqan, Razavi Khorasan
- Zarqan, South Khorasan
- Zarqan County, Fars province
- Zarqan District, Fars province
- Zarqan Rural District, Fars province
