= Lahiji =

Village in Fars province, Iran

Lahiji Persian: لاهيجي
- Village
- Location within Iran
- Coordinates: 29°42′39″N 52°57′31″E
- Country: Iran
- Province: Fars
- County: Zarqan
- District: Rahmatabad
- Rural District: Emamzadeh Ali

Population (2016)
  - Total: 128
- Time zone: UTC+3:30 (IRST)

Lahiji (Persian: لاهيجي (Note: Also romanized as Lāhījī; also known as Lāhejī) is a village in, and the capital of, Emamzadeh Ali Rural District of Rahmatabad District, Zarqan County, Fars province, Iran.

== Demographics ==
=== Population ===
At the time of the 2006 National Census, the village's population was 244 in 64 households, when it was in Band-e Amir Rural District of the former Zarqan District of Shiraz County. The following census in 2011 counted 178 people in 48 households. The 2016 census measured the population of the village as 128 people in 37 households.

In 2018, the district was separated from the county in the establishment of Zarqan County, and the rural district was transferred to the new Central District. Lahiji was transferred to Emamzadeh Ali Rural District created in the new Rahmatabad District.
