= Mehrian, Zarqan =

Village in Fars province, Iran

Mehrian Persian: مهريان
- Village
- Location within Iran
- Coordinates: 29°38′55″N 53°01′19″E
- Country: Iran
- Province: Fars
- County: Zarqan
- District: Rahmatabad
- Rural District: Rahmatabad

Population (2016)
  - Total: 698
- Time zone: UTC+3:30 (IRST)

Mehrian (Persian: مهريان,) (Note: Also romanized as Mehreyān, Mehrīān, and Mehriyan; also known as Mehrūyān) is a village in, and the capital of, Rahmatabad Rural District of Rahmatabad District, Zarqan County, Fars province, Iran. The previous capital of the rural district was the village of Rahmatabad.

== Demographics ==
=== Population ===
At the time of the 2006 National Census, the village's population was 757 in 189 households, when it was in the former Zarqan District of Shiraz County. The following census in 2011 counted 793 people in 231 households. The 2016 census measured the population of the village as 698 people in 217 households.

In 2018, the district was separated from the county in the establishment of Zarqan County, and the rural district was transferred to the new Rahmatabad District.
