= Shul, Zarqan =

Village in Fars province, Iran

Shul Persian: شول
- Village
- Location within Iran
- Coordinates: 29°44′42″N 52°48′32″E
- Country: Iran
- Province: Fars
- County: Zarqan
- District: Central
- Rural District: Band-e Amir

Population (2016)
  - Total: 2,438
- Time zone: UTC+3:30 (IRST)

Shul (Persian: شول) (Note: Also romanized as Shool and Shūl; also known as Sūl) is a village in Band-e Amir Rural District of the Central District of Zarqan County, Fars province, Iran.

== Demographics ==
=== Population ===
At the time of the 2006 National Census, the village's population was 2,221 in 478 households, when it was in the former Zarqan District of Shiraz County. The following census in 2011 counted 2,380 people in 581 households. The 2016 census measured the population of the village as 2,438 people in 657 households. It was the most populous village in its rural district.

In 2018, the district was separated from the county in the establishment of Zarqan County, and the rural district was transferred to the new Central District.
