= Aq Jalu =

Aq Jalu اق جلو
- Village
- Location within Iran
- Coordinates: 29°38′30″N 52°57′13″E
- Country: Iran
- Province: Fars
- County: Shiraz
- Bakhsh: Zarqan
- Rural District: Rahmatabad

Population (2006)
  - Total: 79
- Time zone: UTC+3:30 (IRST)
  - Summer (DST): UTC+4:30 (IRDT)

Aq Jalu (Persian: اق جلو, also Romanized as Āq Jalū; also known as Āqā Jalū) is a village in Rahmatabad Rural District, Zarqan District, Shiraz County, Fars province, Iran. At the 2006 census, its population was 79, in 20 families.
