= Kola Siah =

Kola Siah كلا سياه
- Village
- Location within Iran
- Coordinates: 29°45′21″N 52°51′41″E
- Country: Iran
- Province: Fars
- County: Shiraz
- Bakhsh: Zarqan
- Rural District: Band-e Amir

Population (2006)
  - Total: 166
- Time zone: UTC+3:30 (IRST)
  - Summer (DST): UTC+4:30 (IRDT)

Kola Siah (Persian: كلا سياه, also Romanized as Kolā Sīāh; also known as Kolāh Sīāh) is a village in Band-e Amir Rural District, Zarqan District, Shiraz County, Fars province, Iran. At the 2006 census, its population was 166, in 43 families.
