= Qaleh Gachi =

Qaleh Gachi قلعه گچي
- Village
- Location within Iran
- Coordinates: 29°35′23″N 53°01′25″E
- Country: Iran
- Province: Fars
- County: Shiraz
- Bakhsh: Zarqan
- Rural District: Rahmatabad

Population (2006)
  - Total: 64
- Time zone: UTC+3:30 (IRST)
  - Summer (DST): UTC+4:30 (IRDT)

Qaleh Gachi (Persian: قلعه گچي, also Romanized as Qal‘eh Gachī) is a village in Rahmatabad Rural District, Zarqan District, Shiraz County, Fars province, Iran. At the 2006 census, its population was 64, in 16 families.
