= Dezhabad =

Dezhabad دژاباد
- Village
- Location within Iran
- Coordinates: 29°44′40″N 52°54′12″E
- Country: Iran
- Province: Fars
- County: Shiraz
- Bakhsh: Zarqan
- Rural District: Band-e Amir

Population (2006)
  - Total: 380
- Time zone: UTC+3:30 (IRST)
  - Summer (DST): UTC+4:30 (IRDT)

Dezhabad (Persian: دژاباد, also Romanized as Dezhābād; also known as Dezābād) is a village in Band-e Amir Rural District, Zarqan District, Shiraz County, Fars province, Iran. At the 2006 census, its population was 380, in 86 families.
