= Qabtar Qoluy =

Qabtar Qoluy (Persian: قبطرقلوي), also rendered as Qabtaqolu or Qabtar Qolu, also known as Eyshum or Qeydar Qalu, may refer to:

- Qabtar Qoluy-e Olya
- Qabtar Qoluy-e Sofla
