= Chah Sorkhi =

Village in Fars, Iran

Chah Sorkhi چاه سرخي
- Village
- Location within Iran
- Coordinates: 29°49′41″N 52°35′51″E
- Country: Iran
- Province: Fars
- County: Shiraz
- Bakhsh: Zarqan
- Rural District: Zarqan

Population (2006)
  - Total: 386
- Time zone: UTC+3:30 (IRST)
  - Summer (DST): UTC+4:30 (IRDT)

Chah Sorkhi (Persian: چاه سرخي, also Romanized as Chāh Sorkhī; also known as Chāh Sorkh) is a village in Zarqan Rural District, Zarqan District, Shiraz County, Fars province, Iran. At the 2006 census, its population was 386, in 90 families.
