= Rahmatabad, Zarqan =

Village in Fars province, Iran

Rahmatabad Persian: رحمت آباد
- Village
- Location within Iran
- Coordinates: 29°37′54″N 53°01′56″E
- Country: Iran
- Province: Fars
- County: Zarqan
- District: Rahmatabad
- Rural District: Rahmatabad

Population (2016)
  - Total: 3,402
- Time zone: UTC+3:30 (IRST)

Rahmatabad (Persian: رحمت اباد) (Note: Also romanized as Raḩmatābād) is a village in, and the former capital of, Rahmatabad Rural District of Rahmatabad District, Zarqan County, Fars province, Iran, and serves as capital of the district. The capital of the rural district has been transferred to the village of Mehrian.

== Demographics ==
=== Population ===
At the time of the 2006 National Census, the village's population was 3,286 in 850 households, when it was in the former Zarqan District of Shiraz County. The following census in 2011 counted 3,126 people in 917 households. The 2016 census measured the population of the village as 3,402 people in 1,020 households. It was the most populous village in its rural district.

In 2018, the district was separated from the county in the establishment of Zarqan County, and the rural district was transferred to the new Rahmatabad District.
