= Kuhak =

Kuhak (Persian: كوهك) may refer to these places in Iran:

- Kuhak, Bushehr
- Kuhak, Fars
- Kuhak-e Do, Fars Province
- Kuhak, Isfahan
- Kuhak, Qazvin
- Kuhak, Zanjan
- Kuhak Rural District, in Fars Province
- Kuhak, Sistan and Baluchestan

== See also ==
- Kuhak (film), a 1960 Indian Bengali-language film by Agradoot
