= Qorban Lak =

Qorban Lak قربان لك
- Village
- Location within Iran
- Coordinates: 29°49′21″N 52°50′54″E
- Country: Iran
- Province: Fars
- County: Shiraz
- Bakhsh: Zarqan
- Rural District: Band-e Amir

Population (2006)
  - Total: 750
- Time zone: UTC+3:30 (IRST)
  - Summer (DST): UTC+4:30 (IRDT)

Qorban Lak (Persian: قربان لك, also Romanized as Qorbān Lak) is a village in Band-e Amir Rural District, Zarqan District, Shiraz County, Fars province, Iran. At the 2006 census, its population was 750, in 188 families.
