= Siah Khan =

Tallest man from Iran (1913 – c. 1938)

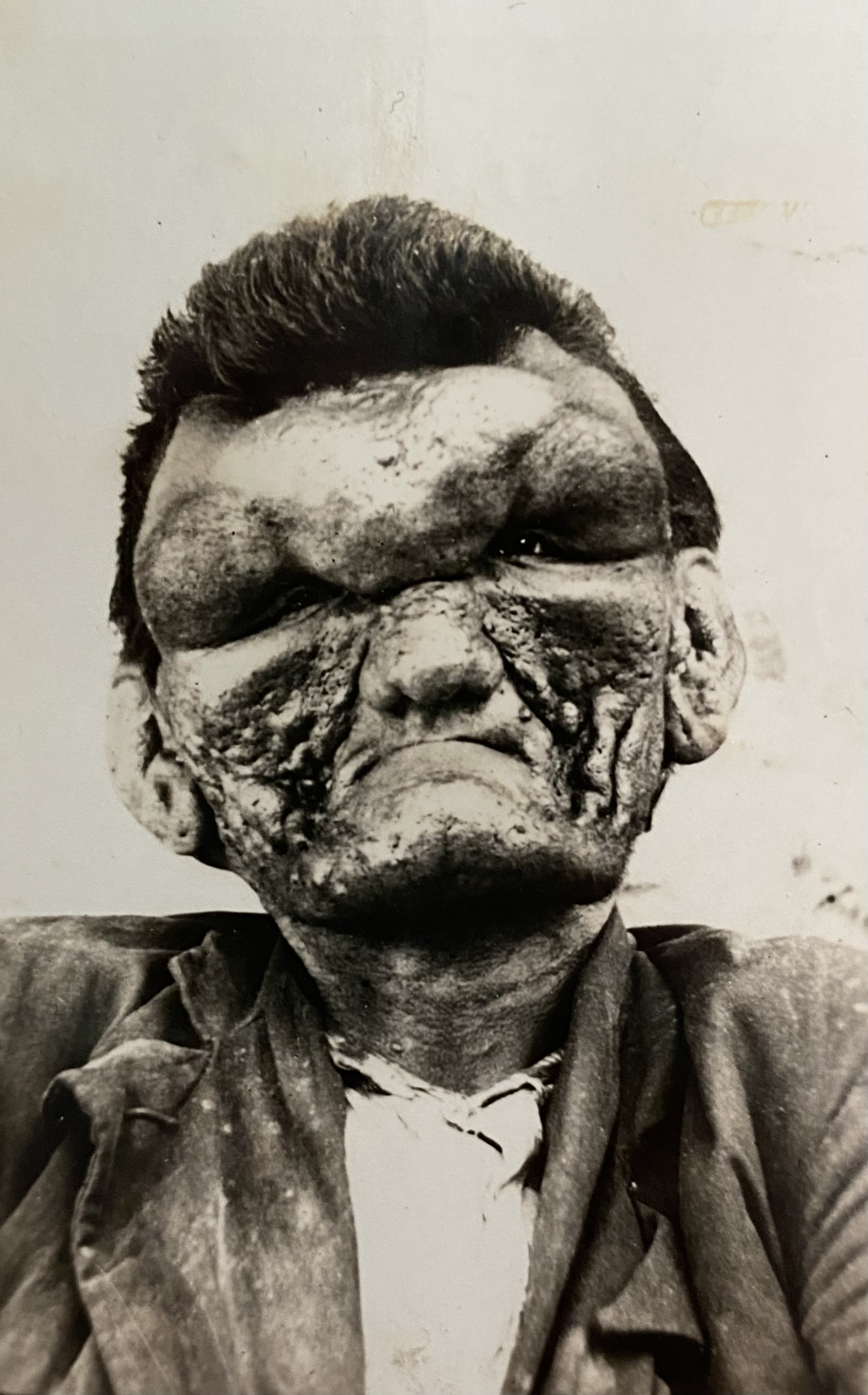
- Born: Siavash Bushehri; 1913; Lapui, Zarqan, Qajar Iran
- Died: c.1938 (aged 24–25); Shiraz, Imperial State of Iran
- Known for: 6th verified tallest person, tallest man from Iran
- Height: 2.59 m (8 ft 6 in)

Siavash Bushehri (Persian: سیاوش بوشهری; 1913 – c. 1938), also known as Siah Khan (Persian: سیاه خان) or Siavash Khan (Persian: سیاوش خان), was a tall Iranian man from Shiraz, who suffered from physical and mental disability, as well as Proteus syndrome.

== Biography ==
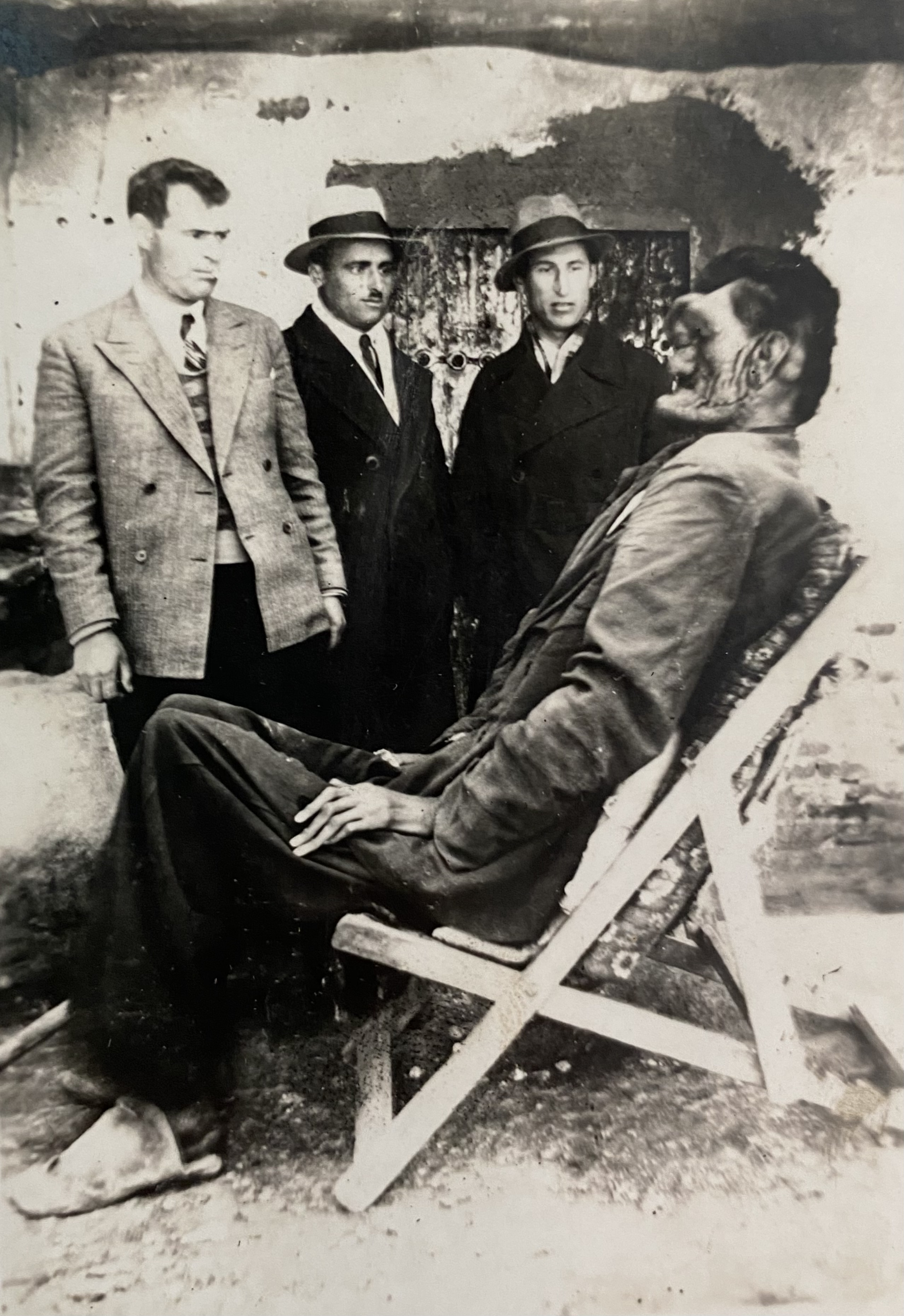
Siah Khan photographed on a chair.

Siah Khan was born in 1913 in Lapui, a village in the Zarqan district, near Shiraz.

He grew normally until the age of six, but after that, he started growing rapidly. His family migrated to Shiraz, and earned money by displaying their large and unusual child in the streets.

At the end of September 1920, he was rented for some time by a person named Khoshorkhan for 6,000 Tomans to be exhibited in Tehran. Dr. Ghorban, the founder of the Shiraz Medical School, found him in 1931 and provided him with financial and medical support. When he was taken to the hospital, Khan was hospitalized for the rest of his life and eventually died of pneumonia and sepsis in 1938. His skeletal remains are now on public display in a glass case at Shiraz's Medical School.

=== Height ===
Siah Khan often claimed 10 ft 6 in (3.20 m) or 11 ft 10 in (3.61 m), which if true, would have made him easily the tallest person to ever live, even dwarfing Robert Wadlow's height of 8 ft 11 9/100 in (2.72 m), but Khan was later measured in 1933 by his doctors at 7 ft 4 in (2.24 m), and later claimed to have grown to 8 ft 6. His arms measured 3 ft 10.06 in (117 cm), his legs were 4 ft 1 1/4 in (1.25 m) long, his skull weighed 0.9 stone (5.7 kg) and he couldn't stand due to his head being too heavy for him. His arms were reportedly so long that he had to wrap an arm once around his head to put food in his mouth.

== See also ==
- List of tallest people

Preceded by Unknown Closest Is Poolad Gurd 7'3" (2.21m)	Tallest Recognized Persian Person Ever; 1938	Succeeded by Incumbent

Preceded by Unknown: Closest is Bernard Coyne	Tallest Recognized Person; 1937 – 1938	Succeeded by Robert Wadlow
