= Band-e Amir, Iran =

Band-e Amir or Band Amir or Bandamir (Persian: بندامير) in Iran, may refer to:

- Band-e Amir, Fars
- Band-e Amir, Markazi
- Band-e Amir Rural District, in Fars Province
