= Takestan-e Sadrabad =

Takestan-e Sadrabad تاكستان صدراباد
- Village
- Location within Iran
- Coordinates: 29°44′52″N 52°38′59″E
- Country: Iran
- Province: Fars
- County: Shiraz
- Bakhsh: Zarqan
- Rural District: Zarqan

Population (2006)
  - Total: 128
- Time zone: UTC+3:30 (IRST)
  - Summer (DST): UTC+4:30 (IRDT)

Takestan-e Sadrabad (Persian: تاكستان صدراباد, also Romanized as Tākestān-e Şadrābād) is a village in Zarqan Rural District, Zarqan District, Shiraz County, Fars province, Iran. At the 2006 census, its population was 128, in 32 families.
