= Deh-e Meydan =

Deh-e Meydan ده ميدان
- Village
- Location within Iran
- Coordinates: 29°43′29″N 52°51′51″E
- Country: Iran
- Province: Fars
- County: Shiraz
- Bakhsh: Zarqan
- Rural District: Band-e Amir

Population (2006)
  - Total: 28
- Time zone: UTC+3:30 (IRST)
  - Summer (DST): UTC+4:30 (IRDT)

Deh-e Meydan (Persian: ده ميدان, also Romanized as Deh-e Meydān, Deh Maidan, and Deh Meydān) is a village in Band-e Amir Rural District, Zarqan District, Shiraz County, Fars province, Iran. At the 2006 census, its population was 28, in 6 families.
