= Band-e Amir, Fars =

Village in Fars province, Iran

Band-e Amir Persian: شول
- Village
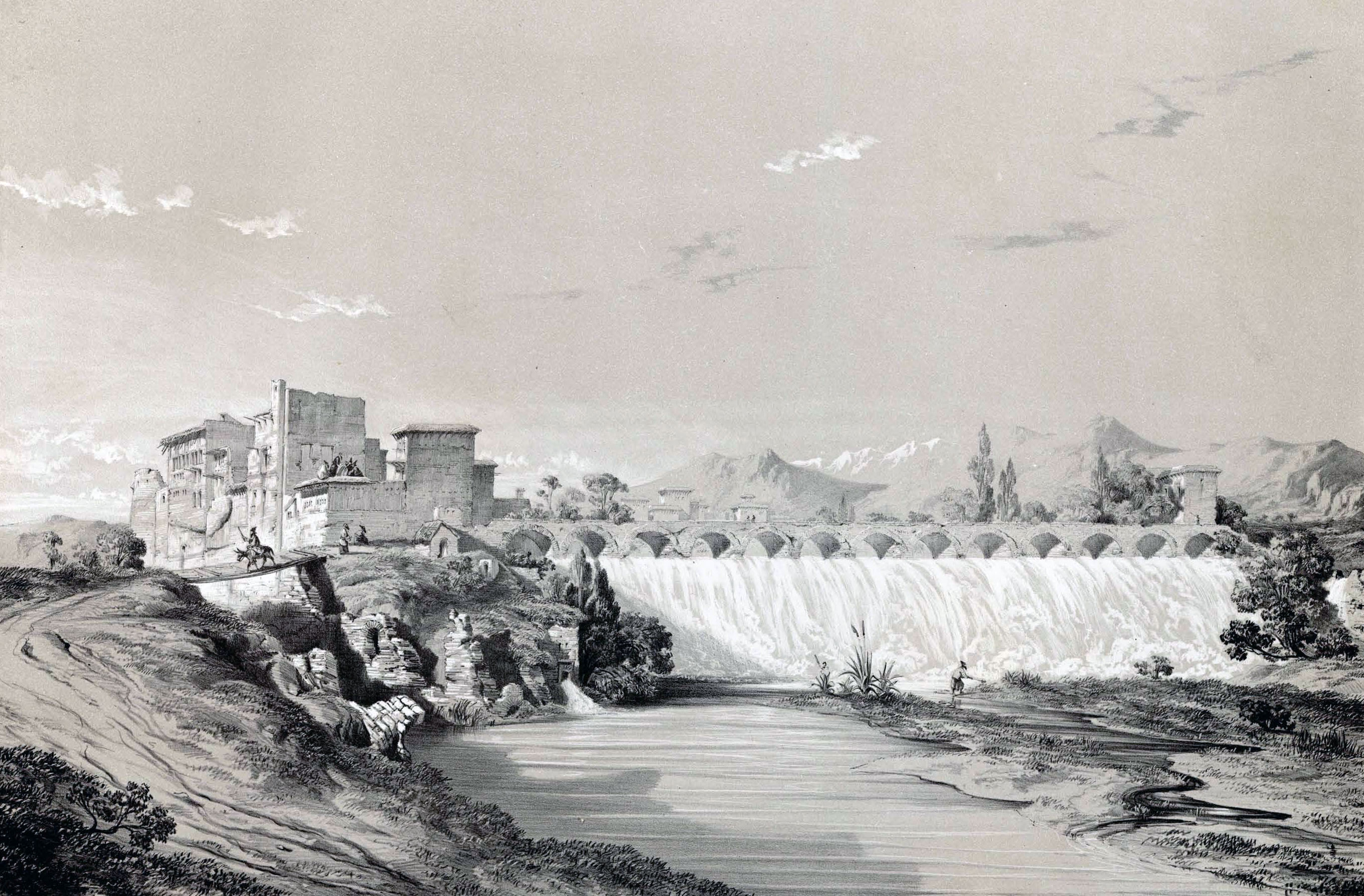
- Band Amir plain

- Location within Iran
- Coordinates: 29°46′25″N 52°50′41″E
- Country: Iran
- Province: Fars
- County: Zarqan
- District: Central
- Rural District: Band-e Amir

Population (2016)
  - Total: 1,172
- Time zone: UTC+3:30 (IRST)

Band-e Amir (Persian: بندامير) (Note: Also romanized as Bandāmir and Band-e Amīr) is a village in, and the capital of, Band-e Amir Rural District of the Central District of Zarqan County, Fars province, Iran.

== Demographics ==
=== Population ===
At the time of the 2006 National Census, the village's population was 1,424 in 370 households, when it was in the former Zarqan District of Shiraz County. The following census in 2011 counted 1,346 people in 399 households. The 2016 census measured the population of the village as 1,172 people in 360 households.

In 2018, the district was separated from the county in the establishment of Zarqan County, and the rural district was transferred to the new Central District.
