= Eyshum =

Eyshum (Persian: ایشوم or عیشوم) may refer to:

- Eyshum, Lamerd
- Eyshum 1, Shiraz County
- Eyshum 2, Shiraz County
