= Dermanehzar-e Do =

Dermanehzar-e Do درمنه زار 2
- Village
- Location within Iran
- Coordinates: 29°40′57″N 52°53′14″E
- Country: Iran
- Province: Fars
- County: Shiraz
- Bakhsh: Zarqan
- Rural District: Band-e Amir

Population (2006)
  - Total: 128
- Time zone: UTC+3:30 (IRST)
  - Summer (DST): UTC+4:30 (IRDT)

Dermanehzar-e Do (Persian: درمنه زار 2, also Romanized as Dermanehzār-e Do; also known as Dermanehzār) is a village in Band-e Amir Rural District, Zarqan District, Shiraz County, Fars province, Iran. At the 2006 census, its population was 128, in 33 families.
