= Fotuhabad =

Fotuhabad (Persian: فتوح اباد) may refer to:

- Fotuhabad, Marvdasht
- Fotuhabad, Shiraz
