= Mehmanabad =

Mehmanabad مهمان اباد
- Village
- Location within Iran
- Coordinates: 29°40′00″N 53°00′53″E
- Country: Iran
- Province: Fars
- County: Shiraz
- Bakhsh: Zarqan
- Rural District: Rahmatabad

Population (2006)
  - Total: 461
- Time zone: UTC+3:30 (IRST)
  - Summer (DST): UTC+4:30 (IRDT)

Mehmanabad (Persian: مهمان اباد, also Romanized as Mehmānābād; also known as Maimoon Abad and Meymūnābād) is a village in Rahmatabad Rural District, Zarqan District, Shiraz County, Fars province, Iran. At the 2006 census, its population was 461, in 110 families.
