= Ekrad =

Village in Fars province, Iran

Ekrad (Persian: اكراد, also Romanized as Ekrād; also known as Ikrād) is a village in Band-e Amir Rural District, Zarqan District, Shiraz County, Fars province, Iran. At the 2006 census, its population was 201, in 47 families.
