= Feshangan =

Feshangan فشنگان
- Village
- Location within Iran
- Coordinates: 29°38′20″N 53°02′02″E
- Country: Iran
- Province: Fars
- County: Shiraz
- Bakhsh: Zarqan
- Rural District: Rahmatabad

Population (2006)
  - Total: 446
- Time zone: UTC+3:30 (IRST)
  - Summer (DST): UTC+4:30 (IRDT)

Feshangan (Persian: فشنگان, also Romanized as Feshangān; also known as Pashangān) is a village in Rahmatabad Rural District, Zarqan District, Shiraz County, Fars province, Iran. At the 2006 census, its population was 446, in 113 families.
