= Fotuhabad, Shiraz =

Fotuhabad فتوح اباد
- Village
- Location within Iran
- Coordinates: 29°36′44″N 52°59′17″E
- Country: Iran
- Province: Fars
- County: Shiraz
- Bakhsh: Zarqan
- Rural District: Rahmatabad

Population (2006)
  - Total: 237
- Time zone: UTC+3:30 (IRST)
  - Summer (DST): UTC+4:30 (IRDT)

Fotuhabad (Persian: فتوح اباد, also Romanized as Fotūḩābād; also known as Fotūhābād-e Korbāl and Fotuh Abad Korbal) is a village in Rahmatabad Rural District, Zarqan District, Shiraz County, Fars province, Iran. At the 2006 census, its population was 237, in 64 families.
