= Vehicle registration plates of Gilan =

Gilan vehicle license plates

Gilan's codes are 46, 56 and 76. In public cars, taxis, and governmental cars the letter is always the same. But in private cars this letter (ب) depends on the city.

== 46 ==
46 is Rasht county's code and all of the letters are for Rasht.

۱۲ ۳۴۵	۴۶

== 56 ==
۱۲ ۳۴۵	۵۶

City	Letter
Bandar Anzali	ب
Lahijan	ج
Astara	د
Talesh	س
Roudsar	ص
Rudbar	ط
Some'e Sara	ق
Fuman	ل
Langrud	م
Rezvanshahr	ن
Amlash	و
Masal	هـ
Shaft	ى

== 76 ==
۱۲ ۳۴۵	۷۶

City	Letter
Siahkal	ب
Astane-ye Ashrafieh	ج
