= Vehicle registration plates of Sistan and Baluchistan =

Sistan and Baluchistan vehicle license plates

Sistan and Baluchestan's codes are 85 and 95. In public cars, Taxis and Governal cars the letter is always the same. But in simple cars this letter (ب) depends on the city.

== 85 ==
85 is Zahedan county's code and all of the letters are for Zahedan.

۱۲ ۳۴۵	۸۵

== 95 ==
۱۲ ۳۴۵	۹۵

City	Letter
Zabol; Zehak; Hirmand	ب
Iranshahr; Dalagan	ج
Khash	د
Saravan; Zaboli; Sib o Soran	س
Nikshahr	ص
Sarbaz	ط
Chabahar; Kenarak	ق
