= Vehicle registration plates of Qazvin =

Qazvin vehicle license plates

Qazvin's vehicle codes are 79 and 89. For public cars, including taxis and government cars, the letter is always the same. For private cars, however, the letter (ب) varies depending on the city.

== 79 ==
Code 79 is used for Qazvin County and Alborz County, and all letters under this code belong to Qazvin.

| ۱۲ ۳۴۵ | ۷۹ |

== 89 ==
| ۱۲ ۳۴۵ | ۸۹ |

| City | Letter |
|---|---|
| Takestan | ب |
| Bouin Zahra | ج |
| Abyek | د |
