= Vehicle registration plates of Hamedan =

Hamedan vehicle license plates

Hamedan Province's codes are 18, 28. 38 was another reserve code for the province but has been reassigned to Tehran and Alborz Provinces after their last reserve code, 21, was used up. In public cars, taxis and government cars the letter is always the same. But in simple cars this letter (ب) depends on the city.

== 18 ==
18 is Hamedan county's code and all of the letters are for Hamedan.

۱۲ ۳۴۵	۱۸

== 28 ==
۱۲ ۳۴۵	۲۸

City	Letter
Nahavand	ب
Malayer	ج
Tuysarkan	د
Kabudrahang	س
Razan	ص
Bahar	ط
Asadabad	ق
Malayer	ل
Nahavand	ن
