= Vehicle registration plates of Khuzestan =

Khuzestan vehicle license plates

Khuzestan's codes are 14, 24 and 34. In public cars, Taxis and Governal cars the letter is always the same. But in simple cars this letter (ب) depends on the city.

== 14 ==
14 is Ahvaz county and Bavi County's code and all of the letters are for Ahvaz.

۱۲ ۳۴۵	۱۴

== 24 ==
۱۲ ۳۴۵	۲۴

City	Letter
Abadan	ب
Khorramshahr	ج
Dezful	د
Behbahan	س
Masjed Soleyman; Andika	ص
Mahshahr	ط
Dasht-e-Azadegan (Susangerd); Hoveizeh	ق
Ramhormoz Haftgel	ل
Andimeshk	م
Shushtar; Gotvand	ن
Shush	و
Shadegan	ه
Izeh	ى

== 34 ==
۱۲ ۳۴۵	۳۴

City	Letter
Baghmalek	ب
Omidiyeh	ج
Hendijan	د
Lali	س
