= Vehicle registration plates of Fars =

Fars vehicle license plates

Fars's codes are 63, 73, 83 and 93. 93 was designated to be a reserved code for Shiraz county, Sarvestan County, Kherameh County and Kavar County in case all combinations of the code 63 are exhausted. In public cars, taxis and governal cars the letter is always the same. But in simple cars this letter (ب) depends on the city.

== 63, 93 ==
63 and starting from March 2013, 93 are Shiraz county, Sarvestan County, Kherameh County and Kavar County's codes and all of the letters are for the mentioned counties

۱۲ ۳۴۵	۶۳

۱۲ ۳۴۵	۹۳

== 73 ==
۱۲ ۳۴۵	۷۳

City	Letter
Jahrom	ب
Larestan; Gerash khonj	ج
Darab	د
Fasa	س
Kazeroon	ص
Firuzabad	ط
Abadeh	ق
Marvdasht; Pasargad	ل
Lamerd	م
Neyriz	ن
Estahban	و
Eqlid	هـ
Sepidan	ى

== 83 ==
۱۲ ۳۴۵	۸۳

City	Letter
Mamasani; Rostam	ب
Zarrindasht	ج
Qirokarzin	د
Mohr	س
Arsanjan	ص
Khorrambid	ط
Bavanat	ق
Farashband	ل
Larestan	م
Kazerun	ن
Marvdasht	و
Jahrom	ه
