= Vehicle registration plates of Lorestan =

Lorestan vehicle license plates

Lorestan's codes are 31 and 41. In public cars, taxis and governmental cars the letter is always the same. But in ordinary cars the letter (ب) depends on the city.

== 31 ==
51 is Khorramabad county and Doureh County's code and all of the letters are for Khorramabad.

۱۲ ۳۴۵	۳۱

== 41 ==
۱۲ ۳۴۵	۴۱

City	Letter
Borujerd	ب
Aligudarz	ج
Dorood	د
Kuhdasht	س
Delfan	ص
Azna	ط
Pol-e-Dokhtar	ق
Selseleh	ل
