= Dudak =

Dudak may refer to:

- Dūdak, the village of Dudej, Zarqan in Iran
- Dudák, a Czech card game

== See also ==
- Duda
- Dudar
