= Vehicle registration plates of Zanjan =

Zanjan vehicle license plates

Zanjan's codes are 87 and 97. In public cars, Taxis and Governal cars the letter is always the same. But in simple cars this letter (ب) depends on the city.

== 87 ==
87 is Zanjan county's code and all of the letters are for Zanjan.

۱۲ ۳۴۵	۸۷

== 95 ==
۱۲ ۳۴۵	۹۷

City	Letter
Abhar	ب
Khodabandeh	ج
Khorramdarreh	د
Eejrud	س
Tarom	ص
Mahneshan	ط
