= Dowdej =

Dowdej or Dudej (Persian: دودج) may refer to:

- Dowdej, Shiraz
- Dudej, Zarqan, Shiraz County
