= Vehicle registration plates of Kurdistan =

Kurdistan vehicle license plates

Kordestan's codes are 51 and 61. In public cars, Taxis and Governal cars the letter is always the same. But in simple cars this letter (ب) depends on the city.

== 51 ==
51 is Sanandaj county's code and all of the letters are for Sanandaj.

۱۲ ۳۴۵	۵۱

== 61 ==
۱۲ ۳۴۵	۶۱

City	Letter
Saqqez 1	ب
Bijar	ج
Baneh	د
Qorveh; Dehgolan	س
Marivan	ص
Divandarreh	ط
Kamyaran	ق
Sarvabad	ل
Saqqez 2	م
