= Kuhak-e Do =

Kuhak-e Do كوهك 2
- Village
- Location within Iran
- Coordinates: 29°41′35″N 52°54′18″E
- Country: Iran
- Province: Fars
- County: Shiraz
- Bakhsh: Zarqan
- Rural District: Band-e Amir

Population (2006)
  - Total: 106
- Time zone: UTC+3:30 (IRST)
  - Summer (DST): UTC+4:30 (IRDT)

Kuhak-e Do (Persian: كوهك 2, also Romanized as Kūhak-e Do; also known as Kūhak-e Pā’īn) is a village in Band-e Amir Rural District, Zarqan District, Shiraz County, Fars province, Iran. At the 2006 census, its population was 106, in 28 families.
