= Kheyrabad-e Mayagh =

Kheyrabad-e Mayagh (Persian: خيرابادمياغ) may refer to:

- Kheyrabad-e Mayagh, Kharameh
- Kheyrabad-e Mayagh, Shiraz
