= Vehicle registration plates of Golestan =

Golestan vehicle license plates

Golestan's codes are 59 and 69. In public cars, Taxis and Governal cars the letter is always the same. But in simple cars this letter (ب) depends on the city.

== 59 ==
59 is Gorgan county's code and all of the letters are for Gorgan.

۱۲ ۳۴۵	۵۹

== 69 ==
۱۲ ۳۴۵	۶۹

City	Letter
Gonbad	ب
Bandar Torkman	ج
Kordkuy	د
Aliabad Katul	س
Azadshahr	ص
Minudasht	ط
Bandar Gaz	ق
Ramian	ل
Aqqala	م
Kalaleh; Maravehtapeh	ن
Gonbad	و
