= Vehicle registration plates of Kerman =

Kerman vehicle license plates

Kerman's codes are 45, 65, 75. But 75 is still not in use. In public cars, Taxis and Governal cars the letter is always the same. But in simple cars this letter (ب) depends on the city.

== 45 ==
45 is Kerman county's code and all of the letters are for Kerman.

۱۲ ۳۴۵	۴۵

== 65 ==
۱۲ ۳۴۵	۶۵

City	Letter
Rafsanjan; Anar County	ب
Bam; Rigan County; Fahraj County	ج
Sirjan	د
Baft; Rabar County	س
Jiroft	ص
Zarand; Kuhbonan	ط
Kahnuj; Ghaleye-Ganj; Faryab County; Rudbar-e Jonub	ق
Shahr-e-Babak	ل
Bardsir	م
Manujan	ن
Anbarabad	و
Ravar	ه
