= Kuhak, Fars =

Kuhak كوهك
- Village
- Location within Iran
- Coordinates: 29°41′40″N 52°53′38″E
- Country: Iran
- Province: Fars
- County: Shiraz
- Bakhsh: Zarqan
- Rural District: Band-e Amir

Population (2006)
  - Total: 383
- Time zone: UTC+3:30 (IRST)
  - Summer (DST): UTC+4:30 (IRDT)

Kuhak (Persian: كوهك, also Romanized as Kūhak) is a village in Band-e Amir Rural District, Zarqan District, Shiraz County, Fars province, Iran. At the 2006 census, its population was 383, in 88 families.
