= Vehicle registration plates of Kermanshah =

Kermanshah vehicle license plates

Kermanshah Province's codes are 19, 29 and 39. But 39 is still not in use. In public cars, Taxis and Governal cars the letter is always the same. But in simple cars this letter (ب) depends on the city.

== 19 ==
19 is Kermanshah county's code and all of the letters are for Kermanshah.

| ۱۲ ۳۴۵ | ۱۹ |

== 29 ==
| ۱۲ ۳۴۵ | ۲۹ |

| City | Letter |
|---|---|
| Eslamabad-e Gharb; Dalaho County | ب |
| Gilan-e Gharb | ج |
| Sarpole Zahab | د |
| Paveh | س |
| Kangavar | ص |
| Qasr-e Shirin | ط |
| Sonqor | ق |
| Javanrud; Ravansar | ل |
| Sahneh | م |
| Harsin | ن |
| Salas-e-Babajani | و |

== 39 (not used) ==
| ۱۲ ۳۴۵ | ۳۹ |

Code 39 belongs to Kermanshah province and has been registered with the Rahour Police for this province, but this code has not been used to register license plates.
