= Vehicle registration plates of Mazandaran =

Mazandaran vehicle license plates

Mazandaran's codes are 62, 72, 82 and 92. But 92 is still not in use. In public cars, Taxis and Governal cars the letter is always the same. But in simple cars this letter (ب) depends on the city.

== 62 ==
62 is Sari county's code and all of the letters are for Sari.

۱۲ ۳۴۵	۶۲

== 72 ==
۱۲ ۳۴۵	۷۲

City	Letter
Amol	ب
Babol	ج
Tonekabon	د
Ramsar	س
Nowshahr	ص
Nur	ط
Behshahr; Galugah	ق
Qaemshahr	ل
Babolsar; Fereydunkenar	م
Chahlus	ن
Mahmudabad	و
Neka	ه
Juybar	ى

== 82 ==
۱۲ ۳۴۵	۸۲

City	Letter
Savadkuh	ب

== 92 ==
۱۲ ۳۴۵	۹۲

City	Letter
Amol	ب
