= Rahmatabad Rural District =

Rahmatabad Rural District (Persian: دهستان رحمت آباد) may refer to:

- Rahmatabad Rural District (Rudbar County)
- Rahmatabad Rural District (Zarandiyeh County)
- Rahmatabad Rural District (Zarqan County)
