= Emamzadeh Ali Rural District =

Rural district in Fars province, Iran

Emamzadeh Ali Rural District Persian: دهستان امامزاده علی
- Rural District
- Location within Iran
- Coordinates: 29°42′48″N 52°58′52″E
- Country: Iran
- Province: Fars
- County: Zarqan
- District: Rahmatabad
- Capital: Lahiji
- Time zone: UTC+3:30 (IRST)

Emamzadeh Ali Rural District (Persian: دهستان امامزاده علی) is in Rahmatabad District of Zarqan County, Fars province, Iran. Its capital is the village of Lahiji, whose population at the time of the 2016 National Census was 128 in 37 households.

== History ==
In 2018, Zarqan District was separated from Shiraz County in the establishment of Zarqan County, and Emamzadeh Ali Rural District was created in the new Rahmatabad District.
