= Kheyrabad, Zarqan =

Kheyrabad خيراباد
- Village
- Location within Iran
- Coordinates: 29°45′07″N 52°57′03″E
- Country: Iran
- Province: Fars
- County: Shiraz
- Bakhsh: Zarqan
- Rural District: Band-e Amir

Population (2006)
  - Total: 274
- Time zone: UTC+3:30 (IRST)
  - Summer (DST): UTC+4:30 (IRDT)

Kheyrabad (Persian: خيراباد, also Romanized as Kheyrābād and Khairābād; also known as Kheyrābād-e Golvār, Kheyrābād-e Maīād, Kheyrābād-e Mayāgh, and Kheyrābād-e Nāmī) is a village in Band-e Amir Rural District, Zarqan District, Shiraz County, Fars province, Iran. At the 2006 census, its population was 274, in 72 families.
