= Qabtar Qoluy-e Sofla =

Qabtar Qoluy-e Sofla قبطرقلوي سفلي
- Village
- Location within Iran
- Coordinates: 29°47′01″N 52°45′22″E
- Country: Iran
- Province: Fars
- County: Shiraz
- Bakhsh: Zarqan
- Rural District: Zarqan

Population (2006)
  - Total: 31
- Time zone: UTC+3:30 (IRST)
  - Summer (DST): UTC+4:30 (IRDT)

Qabtar Qoluy-e Sofla (Persian: قبطرقلوي سفلي, also Romanized as Qabţar Qolūy-e Soflá; also known as 'Eyshūm Yek, Ghebté Gholooé Aval, Qabţaqolū, Qabţar Qolū-ye Soflá, Qeydar Qalū-ye Pā’īn, and Qeydar Qalū-ye Soflá) is a village in Zarqan Rural District, Zarqan District, Shiraz County, Fars province, Iran. At the 2006 census, its population was 31, in 6 families.
