= Rahmatabad District (Zarqan County) =

District in Fars province, Iran

Rahmatabad District Persian: بخش رحمت‌آباد
- District
- Location within Iran
- Coordinates: 29°40′14″N 52°59′59″E
- Country: Iran
- Province: Fars
- County: Zarqan
- Capital: Rahmatabad
- Time zone: UTC+3:30 (IRST)

Rahmatabad District (Persian: بخش رحمت‌آباد) is in Zarqan County, Fars province, Iran. Its capital is the village of Rahmatabad, whose population at the time of the 2016 National Census was 3,402 in 1,020 households.

== History ==
In 2018, Zarqan District was separated from Shiraz County in the establishment of Zarqan County, which was divided into two districts of two rural districts each, with the city of Zarqan as its capital.

== Demographics ==
=== Administrative divisions ===
Rahmatabad District
Administrative Divisions
Emamzadeh Ali RD
Rahmatabad RD
RD = Rural District
