= Dudej, Zarqan =

Dudej دودج
- Village
- Location within Iran
- Coordinates: 29°44′31″N 52°41′43″E
- Country: Iran
- Province: Fars
- County: Shiraz
- Bakhsh: Zarqan
- Rural District: Zarqan

Population (2006)
  - Total: 2,774
- Time zone: UTC+3:30 (IRST)
  - Summer (DST): UTC+4:30 (IRDT)

Dudej (Persian: دودج, also Romanized as Dūdej; also known as Dodej Sarghan, Dūdak, Dūdar, Dūdej-e Zarqān, and Ūdaj) is a village in Zarqan Rural District, Zarqan District, Shiraz County, Fars province, Iran. At the 2006 census, its population was 2,774, in 717 families.
