= Qabtar Qoluy-e Olya =

Qabtar Qoluy-e Olya قبطرقلوي عليا
- Village
- Location within Iran
- Coordinates: 29°47′28″N 52°45′51″E
- Country: Iran
- Province: Fars
- County: Shiraz
- Bakhsh: Zarqan
- Rural District: Zarqan

Population (2006)
  - Total: 26
- Time zone: UTC+3:30 (IRST)
  - Summer (DST): UTC+4:30 (IRDT)

Qabtar Qoluy-e Olya (Persian: قبطرقلوي عليا, also Romanized as Qabţar Qolūy-e 'Olyā; also known as 'Eyshūm Do, Ghebté Gholooé Dovom, Qabţaqolū, Qabţar Qolū-ye 'Olyā, Qeydar Qalū-ye Bālā, and Qeydar Qalū-ye 'Olyā) is a village in Zarqan Rural District, Zarqan District, Shiraz County, Fars province, Iran. At the 2006 census, its population was 26, in 7 families.
