= Imamzadeh Qasem, Zarqan =

Shi'ite tomb in Zarqan, Iran

Imamzadeh Qasem
- امامزاده قاسم
- Location of the complex in Iran

Religion
- Affiliation: Shia Islam
- Ecclesiastical or organisational status: Imamzadeh, mosque, and shrine
- Status: Active

Location
- Location: Zarqan, Fars province
- Country: Iran
- Interactive map of Imamzadeh Qasem
- Coordinates: 29°47′20″N 52°43′1″E

Architecture
- Type: Mosque architecture

The Imamzadeh Qasem (Persian: امامزاده قاسم, IPA: [eˌmɒːmzɒːˈde qɒːˈsem]) is a Shi'ite imamzadeh, mosque and shrine complex, located in Zarqan, Fars province, Iran.

== See also ==
- List of imamzadehs in Iran
- List of mausoleums in Iran
- Shia Islam in Iran
