= Central District (Zarqan County) =

District in Fars province, Iran

Central District (Zarqan County) Persian: بخش مرکزی شهرستان زرقان
- District
- Location within Iran
- Coordinates: 29°44′31″N 52°46′09″E
- Country: Iran
- Province: Fars
- County: Zarqan
- Capital: Zarqan
- Time zone: UTC+3:30 (IRST)

The Central District of Zarqan County (Persian: بخش مرکزی شهرستان زرقان) is in Fars province, Iran. Its capital is the city of Zarqan, whose population at the time of the 2016 National Census was 32,261 in 9,591 households.

== History ==
In 2018, Zarqan District was separated from Shiraz County in the establishment of Zarqan County, which was divided into two districts of two rural districts each, with Zarqan as its capital.

== Demographics ==
=== Administrative divisions ===
Central District (Zarqan County)
Administrative Divisions
Band-e Amir RD
Zarqan RD
Lapui (city)
Zarqan (city)
RD = Rural District
