= Fotuhabad, Marvdasht =

Fotuhabad فتوح اباد
- Village
- Location within Iran
- Coordinates: 30°07′54″N 52°33′50″E
- Country: Iran
- Province: Fars
- County: Marvdasht
- Bakhsh: Dorudzan
- Rural District: Ramjerd-e Do

Population (2006)
  - Total: 896
- Time zone: UTC+3:30 (IRST)
  - Summer (DST): UTC+4:30 (IRDT)

Fotuhabad (Persian: فتوح اباد, also Romanized as Fotūḩābād) is a village in Ramjerd-e Do Rural District, Dorudzan District, Marvdasht County, Fars province, Iran. At the 2006 census, its population was 896, in 207 families.
