= Zarkhan =

Zarkhvan زرخوان
- Village
- Location within Iran
- Coordinates: 32°19′38″N 59°14′15″E
- Country: Iran
- Province: South Khorasan
- County: Sarbisheh
- Bakhsh: Mud
- Rural District: Naharjan

Population (2006)
  - Total: 55
- Time zone: UTC+3:30 (IRST)
  - Summer (DST): UTC+4:30 (IRDT)

Zarkhvan (Persian: زرخوان, also Romanized as Zarkhvān; also known as Zarkhān and Zarqān) is a village in Naharjan Rural District, Mud District, Sarbisheh County, South Khorasan Province, Iran. At the 2006 census, its population was 55, in 15 families.
