= Zarqan =

City in Fars province, Iran

Zarqan Persian: زرقان
- City
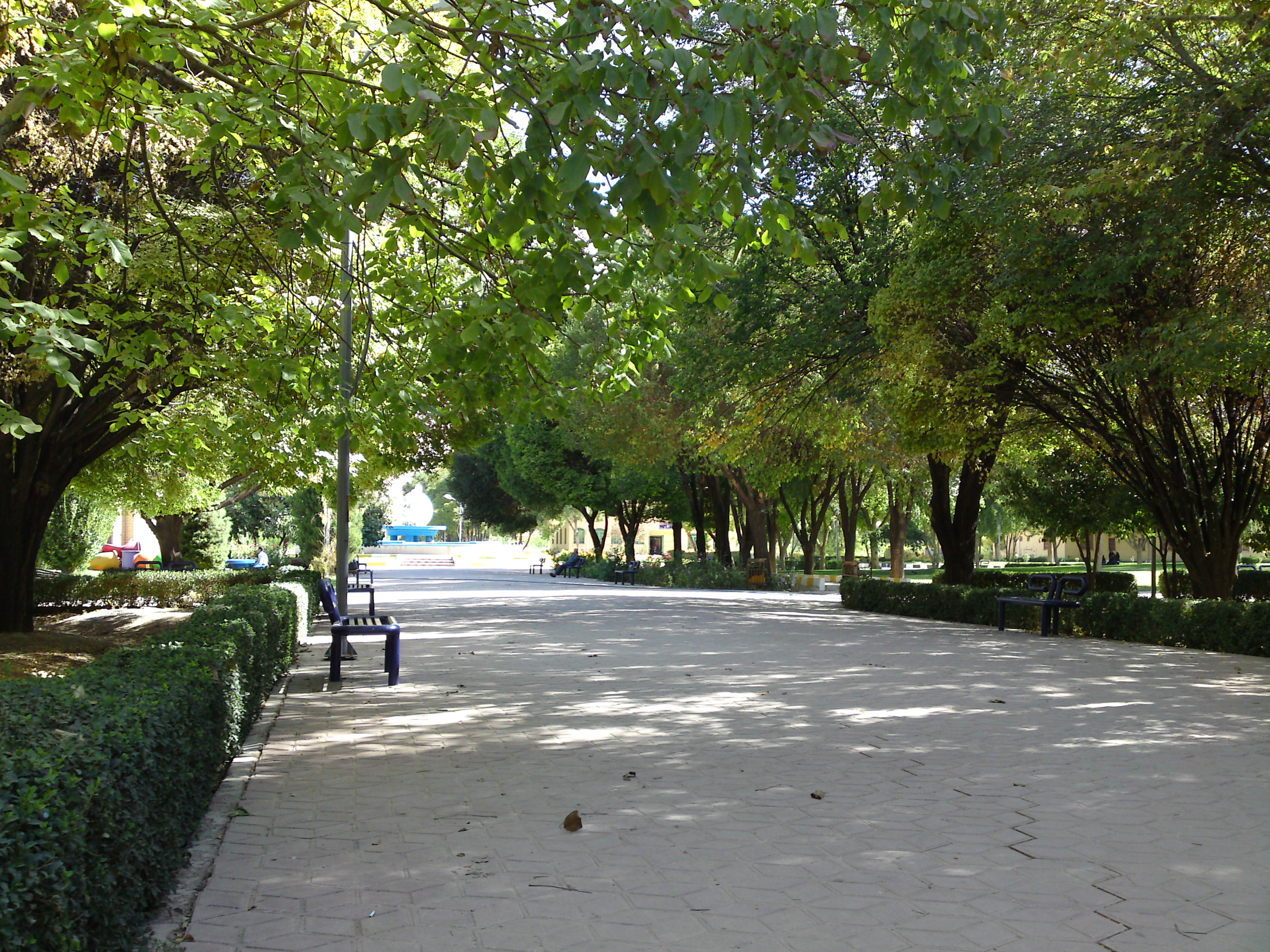
- Azadi Park in Zarqan

- Location within Iran
- Coordinates: 29°46′06″N 52°43′07″E
- Country: Iran
- Province: Fars
- County: Zarqan
- District: Central

Population (2016)
  - Total: 32,261
- Time zone: UTC+3:30 (IRST)

Zarqan (Persian: زرقان) (Note: Also romanized as Zarqān; also known as Zargān and Zarghanak) is a city in the Central District of Zarqan County, Fars province, Iran, serving as capital of both the county and the district. The city is served by Zarqan Airport.

== Etymology ==
Zarqan comes from "Zarghoon", which in Middle Persian means "the place is lush."

== History ==
It is said that Zarqan had good mules for hiring and transporting. Therefore, this city was important for business and transportation during 1791. Historically, Zarqan counted as the battle field among Afghan and Afshari dynasty.

A statue of Sardar Heydar Zarqani, childhood best friend of Lotf Ali Khan Zand as well as his loyal follower until death, was erected in Zarqan as of 2024.

== Climate ==
Climate data for Zarghan(1989-2010 normals, elevation:1,596.0 m (5,236.2 ft))
Month	Jan	Feb	Mar	Apr	May	Jun	Jul	Aug	Sep	Oct	Nov	Dec	Year
Mean daily maximum °C (°F)	10.5 (50.9)	14.1 (57.4)	18.2 (64.8)	23.4 (74.1)	29.8 (85.6)	35.4 (95.7)	37.8 (100.0)	36.8 (98.2)	33.2 (91.8)	27.4 (81.3)	19.7 (67.5)	13.5 (56.3)	25.0 (77.0)
Daily mean °C (°F)	4.5 (40.1)	7.2 (45.0)	10.7 (51.3)	15.3 (59.5)	20.4 (68.7)	25.1 (77.2)	28.3 (82.9)	27.0 (80.6)	23.0 (73.4)	17.6 (63.7)	11.3 (52.3)	6.8 (44.2)	16.4 (61.6)
Mean daily minimum °C (°F)	−1.5 (29.3)	0.3 (32.5)	3.2 (37.8)	7.1 (44.8)	11.0 (51.8)	14.8 (58.6)	18.7 (65.7)	17.2 (63.0)	12.8 (55.0)	7.8 (46.0)	2.8 (37.0)	0.1 (32.2)	7.9 (46.1)
Average precipitation mm (inches)	84.9 (3.34)	62.9 (2.48)	51.5 (2.03)	25.6 (1.01)	4.8 (0.19)	0.6 (0.02)	0.4 (0.02)	0.2 (0.01)	0.2 (0.01)	4.2 (0.17)	21.0 (0.83)	69.0 (2.72)	325.3 (12.83)
Average relative humidity (%)	64	54	48	44	31	23	22	22	24	31	43	59	39
Mean monthly sunshine hours	203.7	210.7	247.2	262.1	330.8	346.5	338.8	336.5	309.6	291.6	234.3	205.1	3,316.9
Source: IRIMO(temperatures), (precipitation), (humidity), (sun)

== Demographics ==
=== Population ===
At the time of the 2006 National Census, the city's population was 19,861 in 5,127 households, when it was capital of the former Zarqan District of Shiraz County. The following census in 2011 counted 28,958 people in 8,112 households. The 2016 census measured the population of the city as 32,261 people in 9,591 households.

In 2018, the district was separated from the county in the establishment of Zarqan County, and Zarqan was transferred to the new Central District as the county's capital.

== See also ==
- Imamzadeh Qasim (Zarqan)
