= Zarqan Rural District =

Rural district in Fars province, Iran

Zarqan Rural District Persian: دهستان زرقان
- Rural District
- Location within Iran
- Coordinates: 29°46′04″N 52°41′43″E
- Country: Iran
- Province: Fars
- County: Zarqan
- District: Central
- Capital: Lapui

Population (2016)
  - Total: 1,092
- Time zone: UTC+3:30 (IRST)

Zarqan Rural District (Persian: دهستان زرقان) is in the Central District of Zarqan County, Fars province, Iran. It is administered from the city of Lapui.

== Demographics ==
=== Population ===
At the time of the 2006 National Census, the rural district's population (as a part of the former Zarqan District of Shiraz County) was 6,154 in 1,464 households. There were 1,726 inhabitants in 77 households at the following census of 2011. The 2016 census measured the population of the rural district as 1,092 in 259 households. The most populous of its 30 villages was Karkhaneh-ye Shalubi (کارخانه شالي کوبي), with 833 people in 229 households.

In 2018, the district was separated from the county in the establishment of Zarqan County, and the rural district was transferred to the new Central District.
