= Lapui =

City in Fars province, Iran

Lapui Persian: لپوئي
- City
- Location within Iran
- Coordinates: 29°47′56″N 52°39′06″E
- Country: Iran
- Province: Fars
- County: Shiraz
- District: Central

Population (2016)
  - Total: 8,985
- Time zone: UTC+3:30 (IRST)

Lapui (Persian: لپوئي) (Note: Also romanized as Lapū’ī; formerly Kaleh-ye Lāpū’ī and Qal‘eh-i-Lapūi (Fort Lapui)) is a city in the Central District of Shiraz County, Fars province, Iran,

== Demographics ==
=== Population ===
At the time of the 2006 National Census, the city's population was 4,975 in 1,333 households, The following census in 2011 counted 6,924 people in 2,000 households. The 2016 census measured the population of the city as 8,985 people in 2,761 households.
