= Rahmatabad Rural District (Zarqan County) =

Rural district in Fars province, Iran

Rahmatabad Rural District Persian: دهستان رحمت آباد
- Rural District
- Location within Iran
- Coordinates: 29°38′51″N 53°01′07″E
- Country: Iran
- Province: Fars
- County: Zarqan
- District: Rahmatabad
- Capital: Mehrian

Population (2016)
  - Total: 6,212
- Time zone: UTC+3:30 (IRST)

Rahmatabad Rural District (Persian: دهستان رحمت آباد) is in Rahmatabad District of Zarqan County, Fars province, Iran. Its capital is the village of Mehrian. The previous capital of the rural district was the village of Rahmatabad.

== Demographics ==
=== Population ===
At the time of the 2006 National Census, the rural district's population (as a part of the former Zarqan District of Shiraz County) was 6,597 in 1,686 households. There were 6,168 inhabitants in 1,783 households at the following census of 2011. The 2016 census measured the population of the rural district as 6,212 in 1,873 households. The most populous of its 15 villages was Rahmatabad, with 3,402 people.

In 2018, the district was separated from the county in the establishment of Zarqan County, and the rural district was transferred to the new Rahmatabad District.
