= Zarqan County =

County in Fars province, Iran

Zarqan County Persian: شهرستان زرقان
- County
- Location of Zarqan County in Fars province (center, purple)

- Location of Fars province in Iran
- Coordinates: 29°44′N 52°49′E
- Country: Iran
- Province: Fars
- Capital: Zarqan
- Districts: Central, Rahmatabad
- Time zone: UTC+3:30 (IRST)

Zarqan County (Persian: شهرستان زرقان) is in Fars province, Iran. Its capital is the city of Zarqan, whose population at the time of the 2016 National Census was 32,261 in 9,591 households.

== History ==
In 2018, Zarqan District was separated from Shiraz County in the establishment of Zarqan County, which was divided into two districts of two rural districts each, with Zarqan as its capital.

== Demographics ==
=== Administrative divisions ===
Zarqan County's administrative structure is shown in the following table.

Zarqan County
Administrative Divisions
Central District
Band-e Amir RD
Zarqan RD
Lapui (city)
Zarqan (city)
Rahmatabad District
Emamzadeh Ali RD
Rahmatabad RD
RD = Rural District

== See also ==
Media related to Zarqan County at Wikimedia Commons
