= Vehicle registration plates of Iran =

Iran
- Current regular legal standard number plate from Iran.
- Country: Iran
- Country code: IR

Current series
- Size: 520 mm × 110 mm 20.5 in × 4.3 in
- Serial format: 12A234-56 (for standard plates)
- Colour (front): Black on white
- Colour (rear): Black on white

The blue strip on the left hand side of the plate

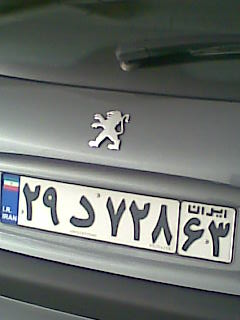
29D728-63 A car from Shiraz

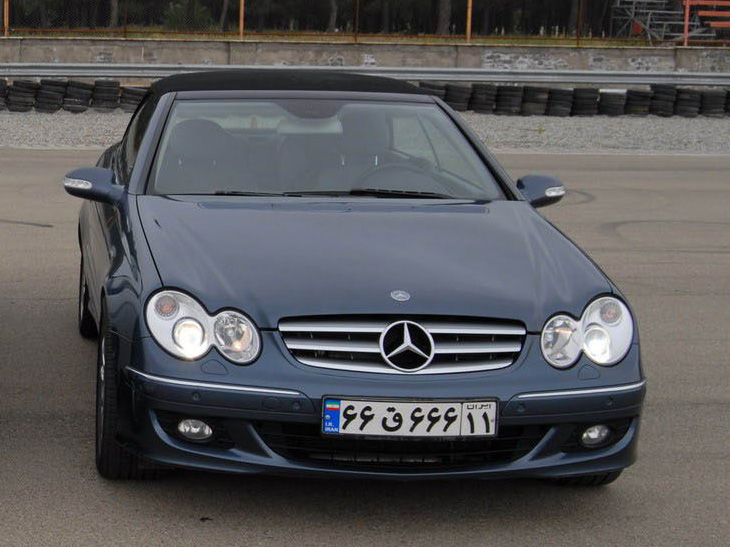
66Q666-11 A car from Tehran city

Iranian license plates (Persian: شماره پلاک) have had European standard dimensions since 2005. Each province in Iran has multiple unique, two-digit codes that are included at the right end of the license plates in a distinguished square outline, above which the word ایران or "Iran" has been written. A province's license plates will not be issued with a new code unless all possible combinations with the old code have been issued. In Tehran, the first code to be issued for the province was code 11, and subsequent codes all increased by 11 as well (meaning codes 11, 22, 33, ..., 99 are unique to Tehran.) Ever since code 99 was fully issued, the new codes for Tehran have started from 10 and subsequently increased by 10. Most province codes increased by 10 based on the first code issued for their province. Khuzestan province, for example, has been allocated codes 24 and 14, and code 24 will not be used before code 14 is fully issued. However, as codes started getting exhausted, numbers and letters have been assigned more liberally and without following this rule of thumb anymore

Iran's license plate format is entirely in Persian alphabet. It follows the format ## X ### - NN

- ## ### is the registration code
- X is the series letter. Each unique classification of vehicles is assigned a unique letter. For private vehicles, for example, if numbers start from 11 A 111, the letter A will not change until numbers reach 99 A 999. Then, plates will go up to 11 B 111. These details are explained further in each section of this article.
- NN is the province code.

== Letter series ==
Iranian license plates are entirely in Persian alphabet. This includes the numbers as well as the letter series. Below is the list of letters and the vehicle type to which they're assigned

Letter in Persian	Equivalent in Latin	Vehicle type	Letter in Persian	Equivalent in Latin	Vehicle type
ب	B	Private vehicles	الف	A	Governmental vehicles
ج	J	Private vehicles	پ	P	Police vehicles
د	D	Private vehicles	ت (Note: The letter ت is accompanied by the English text "TAXI" on license plates)	T	Taxis
س	S	Private vehicles	ث	Ṯ	IRGC vehicles
ص	Ṣ	Private vehicles	ز	Z	Ministry of Defence
ط	Ṭ	Private vehicles	♿︎ (ژ) (Note: While the actual wheelchair symbol ♿︎ is shown on license plates of private vehicles of people with disability, on the police digital database, the letter ژ is used as a placeholder)	Ž	Private vehicles of people with disabilities
ق	Q	Private vehicles	ش	Š	‌Islamic Republic of Iran Army vehicles
ل	L	Private vehicles	ع	O	Public Vehicles
م	M	Private vehicles	ف	F	General Staff of Armed Forces vehicles
ن	N	Private vehicles	ک	K	Agricultural vehicles
و	V	Private vehicles	گ	G	Temporary passage
هـ	H	Private vehicles	D		Diplomatic
ژ‍‍	ZH	Private vehicles	S		Consular and international services

== Numbers ==
Iran's license plates use Persian numerals as opposed to Western Arabic numerals. Below is a table for reference:

Persian	Western Arabic
.	0
۱	1
۲	2
۳	3
۴	4
۵	5
۶	6
۷	7
۸	8
۹	9

== Private vehicles ==
The plate is black on white. The code in the square represents the regional codes. The letter ب can be dependent on where the car's owner's principal address is located. For example, while regional code 24 belongs to Khuzestan province, letter ب (B) is dedicated to residents of Abadan County, while letter ج (J) is dedicated to Khorramshahr County residents. The distribution of the letters has become more complicated with codes and letters being filled up, as some letters have been broken down even more, based on the initial two numbers on the license plates, and as some letters been given to multiple counties, who previously had separate letters from each other.

Nevertheless, a new policy has emerged in 2021, which is a policy of recycling previously issued but no longer in circulation numbers. It is estimated that the total capacity of Iran's numbering system is about 62 million. So far, 55 million numbers have been issued, with 60% of them no longer in circulation, and only 23 million numbers on the streets.

== Private vehicles of people with disabilities ==
The plate is black on white. To distinguish the type of the plate, there is a wheelchair symbol. The code in the square represents the regional codes. The wheelchair symbol in the plate is fixed for all private vehicles of people with disabilities and these types of plates are issued provincially.

In each province, numbers 11 ♿︎ 111 - XX and upwards have been assigned to veterans (mostly from Iran-Iraq war) with a disability. Numbers 51 ♿︎ 111 - XX have been assigned to everyone else with a disability.

== Taxis ==
The plate is black on yellow. To distinguish the type of the plate, there is the letter ت which stands for the word تاکسی, meaning taxi in Persian put on the plate and the English word "taxi" above it. The code in the square represents the regional codes.

The letter ت with the word "taxi" on the plate is fixed for all taxis and these types of plates are issued provincially.

== Public vehicles ==
The plate is black on yellow. To distinguish the type of the plate, there is the letter ع which stands for the word عمومی, meaning public in Persian put on the plate. The code in the square represents the regional codes. The letter ع on the plate is fixed for all public vehicles and these types of plates are issued provincially.

== Agricultural vehicles ==
The plate is black on yellow. To distinguish the type of the plate, there is the letter ک which stands for the word کشاورزی, meaning agricultural in Persian put on the plate. The code in the square represents the regional codes. The letter ک on the plate is fixed for all agricultural vehicles and these types of plates are issued provincially.

== Government vehicles ==
The plate is white on red. To distinguish the type of the plate, there is the word الف (aleph) which is how the first letter of alphabet is pronounced put on the plate. The code in the square represents the regional codes. The word الف on the plate is fixed for all governmental vehicles and these types of plates are issued provincially.

== Protocol vehicles ==
The plate is white on red and there is the word تشریفات with its English translation under it on the plate. The rest is simply a four-digit number.

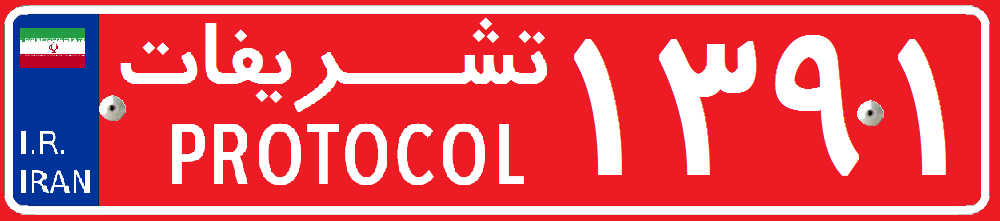

== Military and law enforcement ==
Police license plates were introduced first on September 30, 2012. The rest of the plates were introduced on May 30, 2016, with full replacement planned to be done by March 2017.

=== Police (FARAJA) vehicles ===
The plate is white on dark green. To distinguish the type of the plate, there is the letter پ which stands for the word پلیس, meaning police in Persian put on the plate. The code in the square represents the regional codes. The letter پ on the plate is fixed for all police cars and these types of plates are issued nationally, starting from regional code 11 regardless of which province the vehicles serves.

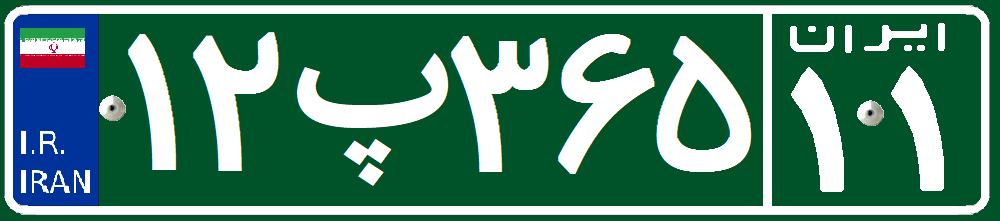

=== Army Police ===
The following plate is installed on vehicles belonging to IRGC (Sepah Pasdaran in Persian). The plate is white on dark green. To distinguish the type of the plate, there is the letter ث is used. The code in the square represents the regional codes. The letter ث on the plate is fixed for all IRGC vehicles and these types of plates are issued nationally, starting from regional code 11 regardless of which province the vehicles serves.

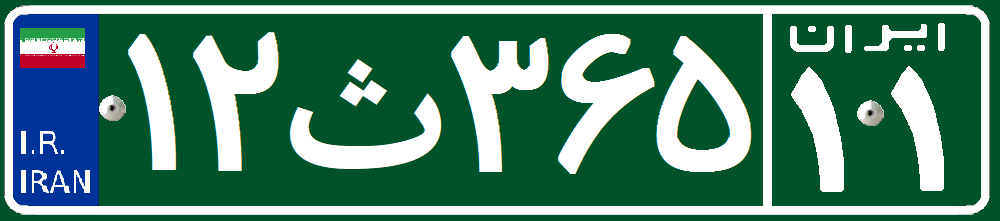

=== Islamic Republic of Iran Army ===
The following plate is installed on cars belonging to Islamic Republic of Iran Army. The plate is black on a light shade of brown. To distinguish the type of the plate, there is the letter ش is used. The code in the square represents the regional codes. The letter ش on the plate is fixed for all army vehicles and these types of plates are issued nationally, starting from regional code 11 regardless of which province the vehicles serves.

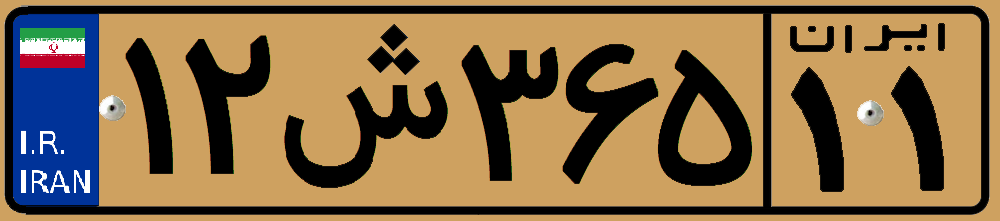

=== Ministry of Defence ===
The following plate is installed on cars belonging to Ministry of Defence and Armed Forces Logistics. The plate is white on light blue. The letter ز is reserved for this type of plate. The code in the square represents the regional codes. The letter ز on the plate is fixed for all cars belonging to the ministry and these types of plates are issued nationally, starting from regional code 11 regardless of which province the vehicles serves.

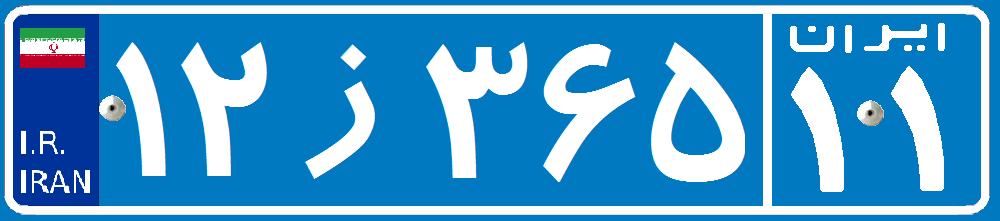

=== General Staff of Armed Forces ===
The following plate is installed on cars belonging to General Staff of Armed Forces of the Islamic Republic of Iran. The plate is white on light blue. To distinguish the type of the plate, there is the letter ف is used. The code in the square represents the regional codes. The letter ف on the plate is fixed for all cars belonging to the general staff and these types of plates are issued nationally, starting from regional code 11 regardless of which province the vehicles serves.

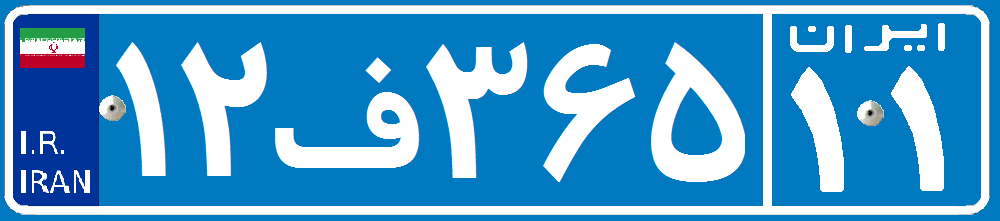

== Historic Vehicles ==
This type of plate is used for older and historically significant vehicles like ones on display at museums. The plate is white on brown with the word تاریخی, meaning "historical" written above a five-digit number. On the left, there is an Iranian flag and a picture of Bagh-e Melli in Tehran. The dimensions of the plate are American-standard.

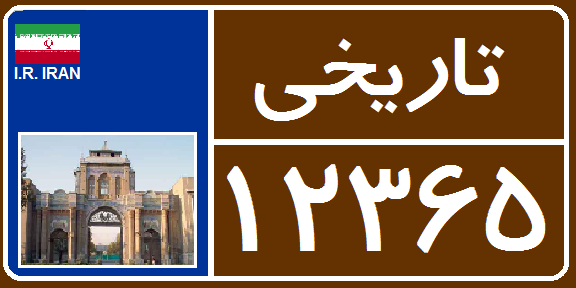

== Political and services plates ==
The new format for political and service plates was introduced on March 6, 2016. Each country or international organization is assigned a three-digit number (like the ۳۶۵ (365) shown in both examples below). For example, 214 is reserved for Germany. So far, 133 countries have been numbered. For each country's embassy, the first two digits increase (11D, 12D or 11S, 12S).

These license plates are issued nationally, starting from regional code 11 regardless of which province the vehicles serves.

=== Political (e.g., diplomatic/consular corps) ===
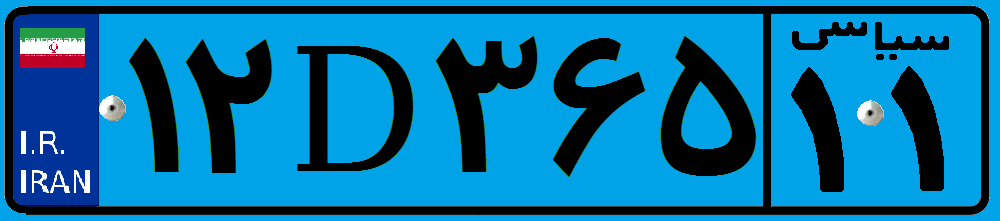

=== Service (e.g., UNHCR) ===
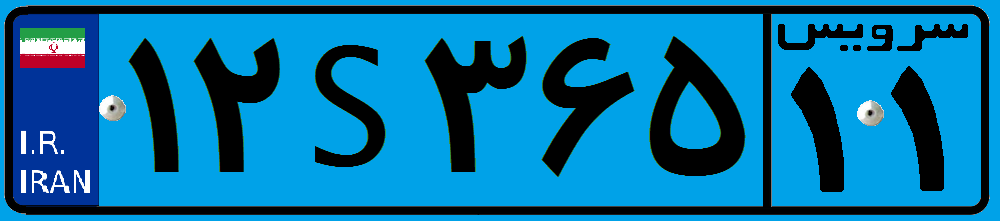

=== Previous format ===
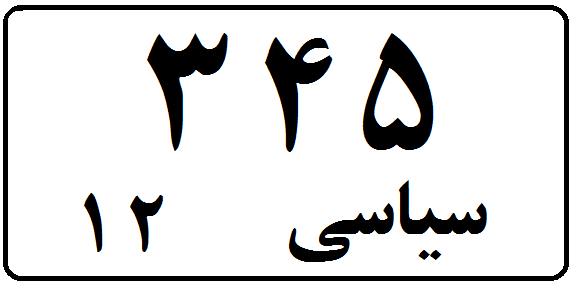

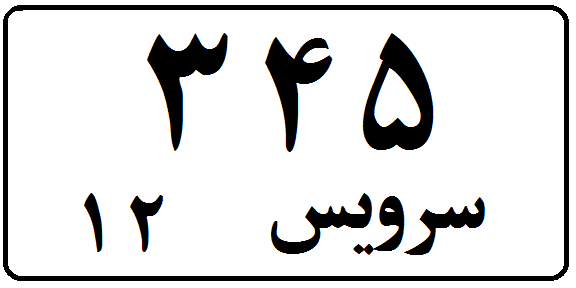

== Temporary passage ==
Plate is used for cars that are newly made

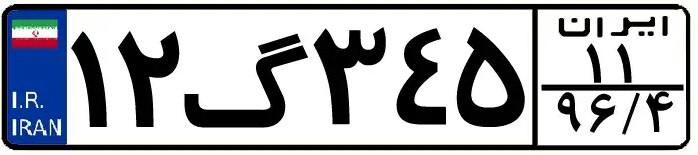
12 گ 365

=== Previous format ===
This plate is used for new cars that entered Iran

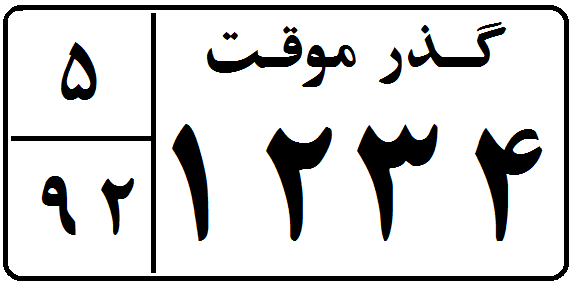

== Provincial codes and letter series ==
Provincial codes are generally given to each province. There are some exceptions to this however.

1. City of Tehran is practically treated as if it were a province, even though it is part of Tehran province
2. Alborz province and Tehran province (except the city of Tehran) are treated as if they were one province. This is because for the first seven years that the current license plate format has been in circulation, they were indeed one united province. Alborz province separated from Tehran province in 2010.
3. While the current license plate format came into circulation from 2003, with Khorasan province being allocated three letters, 12, 32, and 42 (With 52 being kept as reserve for future use). Khorasan province was however divided into three new provinces of Razavi Khorasan, North Khorasan, and South Khorasan in 2004. This division wasn't too late for the system to be revised and for the provincial codes to be readjusted. Thus, while Khorasan Razavi retained codes 12, 32, and 42, North Khorasan was given code 26, and South Khorasan was given code 52. However, it was too late to appropriately adjust the provincial code and letters for the capital cities of these two new provinces, Bojnurd and Birjand respectively. Each of these cities were allocated three new letter series out of their new provincial codes. But they were both allowed to keep the original one letter they were granted, under the provincial code 32, resulting in four letter series to fill up, in total for each. The other counties of these two new provinces had registration under codes 32 and 42 halted, and they switched to new letters under codes 26 and 52 respectively.
4. There is yet another exception thanks to the matters surrounding division of Khorasan province, and it relates to the county of Tabas. Due to local opposition to the bill that would divide Khorasan, and have Tabas County transferred to jurisdiction of Birjand in South Khorasan province, in the year 2001, Tabas County opted to leave Khorasan province altogether and join Yazd province. Then, two years later, Iran introduced this current license plate format, and naturally, Tabas County was granted a letter series, under code 64, for Yazd province. Khorasan province was divided in the year 2004, and the province of South Khorasan was granted provincial code 52. However, fast-forward to 2012, Tabas County resolved its issues with the province of South Khorasan and eventually joined this province, as was originally intended. But, Tabas has retained its original letter, **ق**, under code 64, instead of switching to South Khorasan's code.

As was mentioned in the list of exceptions, within each province, letters are designated to each county. When each letter is exhausted, a new letter from the same provincial codes is granted. When the entire code is exhausted, the province is granted a new code, from which new letters are granted.

For example, while provincial code 24 belongs to Khuzestan province, letter ب (B) is dedicated to residents of Abadan County, while letter ج (J) is dedicated to Khorramshahr County residents. The distribution of the letters has gotten more complicated with codes and letters being filled up, as some letters have been broken down even more, based on the initial two numbers on the license plates, and as some letters been given to multiple counties, who previously had separate letters from each other.

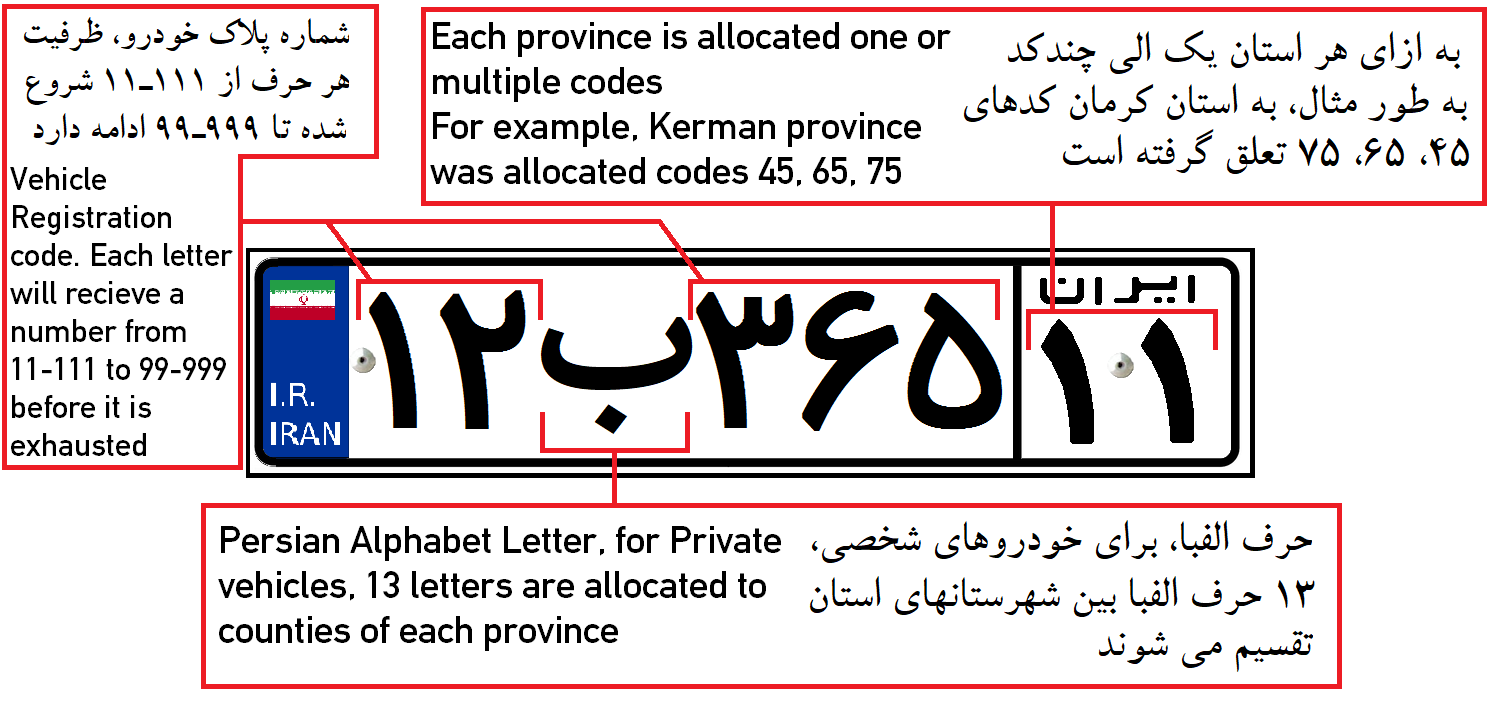
Legend (in English and Persian)

Within each province, registration numbers for all types of vehicles with the exception of private vehicles, are given province-wide, regardless of in which county the owner resides. Some types of vehicles such as police cars and diplomatic plates are allocated nationally, starting from code 11, regardless of the province in which they serve.

=== Provincial codes ===
License plates follow the format ## X ### / NN. The NN portion is a two-digit code granted to provinces.

Province	Code	Province	Code
Tehran City	10-11-20-22-33-40-44; 50-55-60-66-77-88-99	East Azerbaijan	15-25-35
Tehran; Alborz	21-30-38-68-78	West Azerbaijan	17-27-37
Razavi Khorasan	12-32-36-42-74	Sistan and Baluchestan	85-95
Isfahan	13-23-43-53-67	Yazd	54-64
Fars	63-73-83-93	Semnan	86-96
Mazandaran	62-72-82-92	Kerman	45-65-75
Khuzestan	14-24-34	Kohgiluye and Boyer-Ahmad	49
Gilan	46-56-76	Qom	16
Kermanshah	19-29	Kurdistan	51-61
Lorestan	31-41	Ilam	98
North Khorasan	26-32-42	South Khorasan	32-42-52
Bushehr	48-58	Golestan	59-69
Chahar Mahaal and Bakhtiari	71-81	Hormozgan	84-94
Qazvin	79-89	Markazi	47-57
Zanjan	87-97	Hamadan	18-28
Ardabil	91		

=== Breakdown of codes and letters ===
The below 13 letters are used in private vehicle license plates.

Private vehicle letter series on Iranian license plates
Letter	ب	ج	د	س	‌ص	ط	ق	ل	م	ن	و	هـ	ی
Latin equivalent	B	J	D	S	Ṣ	Ṭ	Q	L	M	N	V	H	Y

Number 0 (zero) is only used in the provincial code, and only in the newly granted provincial codes, after 99 has been exhausted. Zero has not been used in the five-digit registration number.

==== Provincial codes 10 to 19 ====
Private vehicle provincial code allocation table, codes 10 to 19
Code	Code (English)	Province	Letter	County	Notes
۱۰	10	City of Tehran	ب ج د س ص ط ق ل م ن و هـ ی		For the purposes of vehicle registration, City of Tehran is treated as if it were an independent province
۱۱	11	City of Tehran	ب ج د س ص ط ق ل م ن و هـ ی		For the purposes of vehicle registration, City of Tehran is treated as if it were an independent province
۱۲	12	Razavi Khorasan	ب ج د س ص ط ق ل م ن و هـ ی	**Mashhad**; Torqabeh/Shandiz	
۱۳	13	Isfahan	ب ج د س ص ط ق ل م ن و هـ ی	**Isfahan**; Harand; Jarqavieh; Kuhpayeh; Varzaneh	
۱۴	14	Khuzestan	ب ج د س ص ط ق ل م ن و هـ ی	**Ahvaz**; Bavi; Hamidiyeh; Karun	
۱۵	15	East Azerbaijan	ب ج د س ص ط ق ل م ن و هـ ی	**Tabriz**	
۱۶	16	Qom province	ب ج د س ص ط ق ل م ن و هـ ی	**Qom**	This is the sole county of Qom province
۱۷	17	West Azerbaijan	ب ج د س ص ط ق ل م ن و هـ ی	**Urmia**	
۱۸	18	Hamadan	ب ج د س ص ط ق ل م ن	**Hamadan**; Famenin	
۱۹	19	Kermanshah	ب ج د س ص ط ق ل م ن و هـ ی	**Kermanshah**	
Notes: 1. Bold county name indicates the original county. The rest of the counties that are not in bold, are counties that have separated from the original county, but are still under the same code and letter as the original county

==== Provincial codes 20 to 29 ====
Private Vehicle Provincial Code Allocation Table, codes 20 to 29
Code	Code (English)	Province	Letter	County	Notes
۲۰	20	City of Tehran	ب ج د س ص ط ق ل م ن و هـ ی		For the purposes of vehicle registration, City of Tehran is treated as if it were an independent province
۲۱	21	Tehran/Alborz^{2}	ب	**Eslamshahr**	
۲۱	21	Tehran/Alborz^{2}	ج	**Robat Karim**; Baharestan	
۲۱	21	Tehran/Alborz^{2}	د	**Shahriar**; Malard; Qods	
۲۱	21	Tehran/Alborz^{2}	س	**Varamin**; Pishva; Qarchack	
۲۱	21	Tehran/Alborz^{2}	ص	**Savojbolagh**; Taleqan; Nazarabad	
۲۱	21	Tehran/Alborz^{2}	ط	**Shahriar**; Malard; Qods	
۲۱	21	Tehran/Alborz^{2}	ق	**Robat Karim**; Baharestan	
۲۱	21	Tehran/Alborz^{2}	ل	**Shahriar**; Malard; Qods	
۲۱	21	Tehran/Alborz^{2}	م	**Varamin**; Pishva; Qarchack	
۲۱	21	Tehran/Alborz^{2}	ن	**Pakdasht**	
۲۱	21	Tehran/Alborz^{2}	و	**Karaj**; Fardis; Eshtehard	
۲۱	21	Tehran/Alborz^{2}	هـ	**Shahriar**; Malard; Qods	
۲۱	21	Tehran/Alborz^{2}	ی	**Damavand**; Pardis	
۲۲	22	City of Tehran	ب ج د س ص ط ق ل م ن و هـ ی		For the purposes of vehicle registration, City of Tehran is treated as if it were an independent province
۲۳	23	Isfahan	ب	**Kashan**	
۲۳	23	Isfahan	ج	**Najafabad**	
۲۳	23	Isfahan	د	**Shahreza**	
۲۳	23	Isfahan	س	**Khomeinishahr**	
۲۳	23	Isfahan	ص	**Golpayegan**	
۲۳	23	Isfahan	ط	**Natanz**	
۲۳	23	Isfahan	ق	**Ardestan**	
۲۳	23	Isfahan	ل	**Khansar**	
۲۳	23	Isfahan	م	**Nain**; Khur & Biabanak	
۲۳	23	Isfahan	ن	**Semirom**	
۲۳	23	Isfahan	و	**Fereydunshahr**	
۲۳	23	Isfahan	هـ	**Falavarjan**	
۲۳	23	Isfahan	ی	**Lenjan**	
۲۴	24	Khuzestan	ب	**Abadan**	
۲۴	24	Khuzestan	ج	**Khorramshahr**	
۲۴	24	Khuzestan	د	**Dezful**	
۲۴	24	Khuzestan	س	**Behbahan**; Aghajari	
۲۴	24	Khuzestan	ص	**Masjed Soleyman**; Andika	
۲۴	24	Khuzestan	ط	**Mahshahr**	
۲۴	24	Khuzestan	ق	**Dasht-e Azadegan**; Hoveyzeh	
۲۴	24	Khuzestan	ل	**Ramhormoz**; Ramshir; Haftkel	
۲۴	24	Khuzestan	م	**Andimeshk**	
۲۴	24	Khuzestan	ن	**Shushtar**; Gotvand	
۲۴	24	Khuzestan	و	**Shush**; Karkheh	
۲۴	24	Khuzestan	هـ	**Shadegan**	From [11 هـ H 111 - 24] To [53 هـ H 999 - 24]
۲۴	24	Khuzestan	هـ	**Shadegan**; **Mahshahr**	From [54 هـ H 111 - 24] upwards
۲۴	24	Khuzestan	ی	**Izeh**	
۲۵	25	East Azerbaijan	ب	**Maragheh**	
۲۵	25	East Azerbaijan	ج	**Marand**	
۲۵	25	East Azerbaijan	د	**Miyaneh**	
۲۵	25	East Azerbaijan	س	**Ahar**; Hurand	
۲۵	25	East Azerbaijan	ص	**Sarab**	
۲۵	25	East Azerbaijan	ط	**Jolfa**	
۲۵	25	East Azerbaijan	ق	**Hashtrud**	
۲۵	25	East Azerbaijan	ل	**Bonab**	
۲۵	25	East Azerbaijan	م	**Bostanabad**	
۲۵	25	East Azerbaijan	ن	**Shabestar**	
۲۵	25	East Azerbaijan	و	**Kaleybar**; Khoda Afarin	
۲۵	25	East Azerbaijan	هـ	**Heris**	
۲۵	25	East Azerbaijan	ی	**Azarshahr**	
۲۶	26	North Khorasan	ب ج د س	**Bojnurd**; Raz & Jargalan	
۲۶	26	North Khorasan	ص	**Shirvan**	
۲۶	26	North Khorasan	ط	**Esfarayen**	
۲۶	26	North Khorasan	ق	**Jajarm**; Garmeh	
۲۶	26	North Khorasan	ل	**Maneh & Samalqan**	
۲۶	26	North Khorasan	م	**Faruj**	
۲۷	27	West Azerbaijan	ب	**Khoy**; Chaypareh	
۲۷	27	West Azerbaijan	ج	**Mahabad**	
۲۷	27	West Azerbaijan	د	**Maku**; Poldasht; Showt	
۲۷	27	West Azerbaijan	س	**Salmas**	
۲۷	27	West Azerbaijan	ص	**Naqadeh**	
۲۷	27	West Azerbaijan	ط	**Miandoab**	
۲۷	27	West Azerbaijan	ق	**Takab**	
۲۷	27	West Azerbaijan	ل	**Shahin Dezh**	
۲۷	27	West Azerbaijan	م	**Sardasht**	
۲۷	27	West Azerbaijan	ن	**Bukan**	
۲۷	27	West Azerbaijan	و	**Piranshahr**	
۲۷	27	West Azerbaijan	هـ	**Chaldoran**	
۲۷	27	West Azerbaijan	ی	**Oshnavieh**	
۲۸	28	Hamedan	ب	**Nahavand**	
۲۸	28	Hamedan	ج	**Malayer**	
۲۸	28	Hamedan	د	**Tuyserkan**	
۲۸	28	Hamedan	س	**Kabudarahang**	
۲۸	28	Hamedan	ص	**Razan**; Qorveh-e Darjazin	
۲۸	28	Hamedan	ط	**Bahar**	
۲۸	28	Hamedan	ق	**Asadabad**	
۲۸	28	Hamedan	ل	**Malayer**	
۲۸	28	Hamedan	م	**Nahavand**	
۲۸	28	Hamedan	ن	**Malayer**	
۲۹	29	Kermanshah	ب	**Eslamabad-e Gharb**; Dalahu	
۲۹	29	Kermanshah	ج	**Gilan-e Gharb**	
۲۹	29	Kermanshah	د	'Sarpol-e Zahab	
۲۹	29	Kermanshah	س	**Paveh**	
۲۹	29	Kermanshah	ص	**Kangavar**	
۲۹	29	Kermanshah	ط	**Qasr-e Shirin**	
۲۹	29	Kermanshah	ق	**Sonqor**	
۲۹	29	Kermanshah	ل	**Javanrud**; Ravansar	
۲۹	29	Kermanshah	م	**Sahneh**	
۲۹	29	Kermanshah	ن	**Harsin**	
۲۹	29	Kermanshah	و	**Salas-e Babajani**	
۲۹	29	Kermanshah	هـ	**Eslamabad-e Gharb**; Dalahu	
Notes: 1. Bold county name indicates the original county. The rest of the counties that are not in bold, are counties that have separated from the original county, but are still under the same code and letter as the original county; 2. Tehran and Alborz provinces are treated as if they are one united province, for the purpose of assigning Provincial license plate codes.

==== Provincial codes 30 to 39 ====
Private Vehicle Provincial Code Allocation Table, codes 30 to 39
Code	Code (English)	Province	Letter	County	Notes
۳۰	30	Tehran/Alborz^{2}	ب	**Shahriar**; Malard; Qods	
۳۰	30	Tehran/Alborz^{2}	ج	**Robat Karim**; Baharestan	
۳۰	30	Tehran/Alborz^{2}	د س	**Karaj**; Fardis; Eshtehard; **Savojbolagh**; Taleqan; Nazarabad	These letters cover all counties of Alborz province
۳۰	30	Tehran/Alborz^{2}	ص	**Eslamshahr**	
۳۰	30	Tehran/Alborz^{2}	ط	**Varamin**; Pishva; Qarchack; **Pakdasht**	
۳۰	30	Tehran/Alborz^{2}	ق	**Shahriar**; Malard; Qods	
۳۰	30	Tehran/Alborz^{2}	ل م	**Karaj**; Fardis; Eshtehard; **Savojbolagh**; Taleqan; Nazarabad	These letters cover all counties of Alborz province
۳۰	30	Tehran/Alborz^{2}	ن	**Shahriar**; Malard; Qods	
۳۰	30	Tehran/Alborz^{2}	و	**Robat Karim**; Baharestan	
۳۰	30	Tehran/Alborz^{2}	هـ	**Damavand**; Pardis	
۳۱	31	Lorestan	ب ج د س ص ط	**Khorramabad**; Chegeni	
۳۲	32	Razavi Khorasan^{3}	ب	**Neyshabur**; Firuzeh; Zeberkhan	
۳۲	32	Razavi Khorasan^{3}	ج	**Sabzevar**; Davarzan; Joghatai; Joveyn; Khoshab; Sheshtamad	
۳۲	32	Razavi Khorasan^{3}	د	**Birjand**; Darmian; Khusf (In South Khorasan)	This letter was allocated to these counties in 2003 at a time when they were part of undivided Khorasan province. These counties became part of the new province of South Khorasan, which was allocated a new Provincial code, **52**. But, since these counties were well under way in using the available combinations under code **32**, it was decided that they keep this code, and switch to **52** for the next letter.
۳۲	32	Razavi Khorasan^{3}	س	**Bojnurd**; Raz & Jargalan (In North Khorasan)	This letter was allocated to these counties in 2003 at a time when they were part of undivided Khorasan province. These counties became part of the new province of North Khorasan, which was allocated a new Provincial code, **26**. But, since these counties were well under way in using the available combinations under code **32**, it was decided that they keep this code, and switch to **26** for the next letter.
۳۲	32	Razavi Khorasan^{3}	ص	**Torbat-e Jam**; Salehabad	
۳۲	32	Razavi Khorasan^{3}	ط	**Quchan**	
۳۲	32	Razavi Khorasan^{3}	ق	**Gonabad**; Bajestan	
۳۲	32	Razavi Khorasan^{3}	ل	**Torbat-e Heydarieh**; Mahvelat; Zaveh	
۳۲	32	Razavi Khorasan^{3}	م	**Kashmar**; Khalilabad; Kuhsorkh	
۳۲	32	Razavi Khorasan^{3}	ن	**Qaenat**; Zirkuh (In South Khorasan)	From [11 ن N 111 - 32] To [34 ن N 999 - 32] This letter was allocated to these counties in 2003 at a time when they were part of undivided Khorasan province. These counties became part of the new province of South Khorasan, which was allocated a new Provincial code, **52**. Rest of this letter was reallocated.
۳۲	32	Razavi Khorasan^{3}	ن	**Torbat-e Heydarieh**; Mahvelat; Zaveh	From [35 ن N 111 - 32] upwards The letter initially belonged to and is partially used by counties that became part of South Khorasan in 2004.
۳۲	32	Razavi Khorasan^{3}	و	**Ferdows**; Boshruyeh; Sarayan (In South Khorasan)	From [11 و V 111 - 32] To [34 و V 999 - 32] This letter was allocated to these counties in 2003 at a time when they were part of undivided Khorasan province. These counties became part of the new province of South Khorasan, which was allocated a new Provincial code, **52**. Rest of this letter was reallocated.
۳۲	32	Razavi Khorasan^{3}	و	**Mashhad**; Torqabeh/Shandiz	From [35 و V 111 - 32] upwards The letter initially belonged to and is partially used by counties that became part of South Khorasan in 2004.
۳۲	32	Razavi Khorasan^{3}	هـ	**Taybad**; Bakharz	
۳۲	32	Razavi Khorasan^{3}	ی	**Nehbandan** (In South Khorasan)	From [11 ی Y 111 - 32] To [16 ی Y 999 - 32] This letter was allocated to this county in 2003 at a time when it was part of undivided Khorasan province. This county became part of the new province of South Khorasan, which was allocated a new Provincial code, **52**. Rest of this letter was reallocated.
۳۲	32	Razavi Khorasan^{3}	ی	**Neyshabur**; Firuzeh; Zeberkhan	From [17 ی Y 111 - 32] upwards The letter initially belonged to and is partially used by a county that became part of South Khorasan in 2004.
۳۳	33	City of Tehran	ب ج د س ص ط ق ل م ن و هـ ی		For the purposes of vehicle registration, City of Tehran is treated as if it were an independent province
۳۴	34	Khuzestan	ب	**Bagh-e Malek**	
۳۴	34	Khuzestan	ج	**Omidiyeh**	
۳۴	34	Khuzestan	د	**Hendijan**	From [11 د D 111 - 34] To [26 د D 999 - 34]
۳۴	34	Khuzestan	د	**Hendijan**; **Khorramshahr**	From [27 د D 111 - 34] upwards
۳۴	34	Khuzestan	س	**Lali**	From [11 س S 111 - 34] To [16 س S 999 - 34]
۳۴	34	Khuzestan	س	**Lali**; **Andimeshk**	From [17 س S 111 - 34] upwards
۳۴	34	Khuzestan	ص	**Dezful**	
۳۴	34	Khuzestan	ط	**Mahshahr**	
۳۴	34	Khuzestan	ق	**Abadan**	
۳۴	34	Khuzestan	ن	**Behbahan**; Aghajari	
۳۴	34	Khuzestan	و	**Dezful**	
۳۴	34	Khuzestan	هـ	**Shushtar**; Gotvand	
۳۴	34	Khuzestan	ی	**Ahvaz**; Bavi; Hamidiyeh; Karun	
۳۵	35	East Azerbaijan	ب	**Osku**	
۳۵	35	East Azerbaijan	ج	**Varzaqan**	From [11 ج J 111 - 35] To [27 ج J 999 - 35]
۳۵	35	East Azerbaijan	ج	**Varzaqan**; **Bonab**	From [28 ج J 111 - 35] upwards
۳۵	35	East Azerbaijan	د	**Ajabshir**	From [11 د D 111 - 35] To [46 د D 999 - 35]
۳۵	35	East Azerbaijan	د	**Ajabshir**; **Bonab**	From [47 د D 111 - 35] upwards
۳۵	35	East Azerbaijan	س	**Charuymaq**	From [11 س S 111 - 35] To [21 س S 999 - 35]
۳۵	35	East Azerbaijan	س	**Charuymaq**; **Tabriz**	From [22 س S 111 - 35] upwards
۳۵	35	East Azerbaijan	ص	**Malekan**	
۳۵	35	East Azerbaijan	ط	**Marand**	
۳۵	35	East Azerbaijan	ق	**Maragheh**	
۳۵	35	East Azerbaijan	ل م	**Tabriz**	
۳۵	35	East Azerbaijan	ن	**Miyaneh**	
۳۵	35	East Azerbaijan	و	**Ahar**; Hurand	
۳۵	35	East Azerbaijan	هـ ی	**Tabriz**	
۳۶	36	Razavi Khorasan	ب ج د س ص ط و هـ	**Mashhad**; Torqabeh/Shandiz	
۳۶	36	Razavi Khorasan	ق	**Kashmar**; Khalilabad; Kuhsorkh	
۳۶	36	Razavi Khorasan	ل	**Neyshabur**; Firuzeh; Zeberkhan	
۳۶	36	Razavi Khorasan	م	**Sabzevar**; Davarzan; Joghatai; Joveyn; Khoshab; Sheshtamad	
۳۶	36	Razavi Khorasan	ن	**Torbat-e Heydarieh**; Mahvelat; Zaveh	
۳۶	36	Razavi Khorasan	ی	**Torbat-e Jam**; Salehabad	
۳۷	37	West Azerbaijan	ب	**Khoy**; Chaypareh	
۳۷	37	West Azerbaijan	ج	**Miandoab**	
۳۷	37	West Azerbaijan	د	**Naqadeh**	
۳۷	37	West Azerbaijan	س	**Salmas**	
۳۷	37	West Azerbaijan	ص	**Mahabad**	
۳۷	37	West Azerbaijan	ط	**Bukan**	
۳۷	37	West Azerbaijan	ق	**Salmas**	
۳۷	37	West Azerbaijan	ل	**Maku**; Poldasht; Showt	
۳۷	37	West Azerbaijan	م	**Khoy**; Chaypareh	
۳۷	37	West Azerbaijan	ن	**Miandoab**	
۳۸	38	Tehran/Alborz^{2}	ب	**Karaj**; Fardis; Eshtehard; **Savojbolagh**; Taleqan; Nazarabad	This letter covers all counties of Alborz province
۳۸	38	Tehran/Alborz^{2}	ج	**Shahriar**; Malard; Qods	
۳۸	38	Tehran/Alborz^{2}	د س	**Karaj**; Fardis; Eshtehard; **Savojbolagh**; Taleqan; Nazarabad	These letters cover all counties of Alborz province
۳۸	38	Tehran/Alborz^{2}	ص	**Varamin**; Pishva; Qarchack	
۳۸	38	Tehran/Alborz^{2}	ط	**Shahriar**; Malard; Qods	
۳۸	38	Tehran/Alborz^{2}	ق	**Eslamshahr**	
۳۸	38	Tehran/Alborz^{2}	ل	**Robat Karim**; Baharestan	
۳۸	38	Tehran/Alborz^{2}	م ن	**Karaj**; Fardis; Eshtehard; **Savojbolagh**; Taleqan; Nazarabad	These letters cover all counties of Alborz province
۳۸	38	Tehran/Alborz^{2}	و	**Shahriar**; Malard; Qods	
۳۸	38	Tehran/Alborz^{2}	هـ ی	**Karaj**; Fardis; Eshtehard; **Savojbolagh**; Taleqan; Nazarabad	These letters cover all counties of Alborz province
۳۹	39	Code not allocated yet			
Notes: 1. Bold county name indicates the original county. The rest of the counties that are not in bold, are counties that have separated from the original county, but are still under the same code and letter as the original county; 2. Tehran and Alborz provinces are treated as if they are one united province, for the purpose of assigning Provincial license plate codes.; 3. As noted in the right-hand column where appropriate, anomalies are observed with this Code, due to division of Khorasan province that occurred 1 year after the start of issuing this license plate format.

==== Provincial codes 40 to 49 ====
Private Vehicle Provincial Code Allocation Table, codes 40 to 49
Code	Code (English)	Province	Letter	County	Notes
۴۰	40	City of Tehran	ب ج د س ص ط ق ل م ن و هـ ی		For the purposes of vehicle registration, City of Tehran is treated as if it were an independent Province
۴۱	41	Lorestan	ب	**Borujerd**	
۴۱	41	Lorestan	ج	**Aligudarz**	
۴۱	41	Lorestan	د	**Dorud**	
۴۱	41	Lorestan	س	**Kuhdasht**; Rumeshkan	
۴۱	41	Lorestan	ص	**Delfan**	
۴۱	41	Lorestan	ط	**Azna**	
۴۱	41	Lorestan	ق	**Pol-e Dokhtar**	
۴۱	41	Lorestan	ل	**Selseleh**	
۴۱	41	Lorestan	م ن	**Borujerd**	
۴۱	41	Lorestan	و	**Dorud**; **Kuhdasht**; Rumeshkan	
۴۲	42	Razavi Khorasan^{2}	ب	**Fariman**	
۴۲	42	Razavi Khorasan^{2}	ج	**Shirvan**; Faruj (In North Khorasan)	From [11 ج J 111 - 42] To [14 ج J 999 - 42] This letter was allocated to these counties in 2003 at a time when they were part of undivided Khorasan province. These counties became part of the new province of North Khorasan, which was allocated a new Provincial code, **26**. Rest of this letter was over a transition period, reallocated.
۴۲	42	Razavi Khorasan^{2}	ج	**Shirvan**; Faruj (In North Khorasan); **Mashhad**; Torqabeh/Shandiz	From [15 ج J 111 - 42] To [36 ج J 999 - 42] Shared between these North Khorasan counties and these Razavi Khorasan counties
۴۲	42	Razavi Khorasan^{2}	ج	**Mashhad**; Torqabeh/Shandiz	From [37 ج J 111 - 42] upwards The letter initially belonged to and is partially used by counties that became part of North Khorasan in 2004.
۴۲	42	Razavi Khorasan^{2}	د	**Sarakhs County**	
۴۲	42	Razavi Khorasan^{2}	س	**Dargaz**	
۴۲	42	Razavi Khorasan^{2}	ص	**Khaf**	
۴۲	42	Razavi Khorasan^{2}	ط	**Chenaran**	
۴۲	42	Razavi Khorasan^{2}	ق	**Esfarayen** (In North Khorasan)	From [11 ق Q 111 - 42] To [32 ق Q 999 - 42] This letter was allocated to these counties in 2003 at a time when they were part of undivided Khorasan province. These counties became part of the new province of North Khorasan, which was allocated a new Provincial code, **26**. Rest of this letter was reallocated.
۴۲	42	Razavi Khorasan^{2}	ق	**Mashhad**; Torqabeh/Shandiz	From [33 ق Q 111 - 42] upwards The letter initially belonged to and is partially used by counties that became part of North Khorasan in 2004.
۴۲	42	Razavi Khorasan^{2}	ل	**Bardaskan**	
۴۲	42	Razavi Khorasan^{2}	م	**Roshtkhar**	From [11 م M 111 - 42] To [36 م M 999 - 35]
۴۲	42	Razavi Khorasan^{2}	م	**Roshtkhar**; **Gonabad**; Bajestan	From [37 م M 111 - 42] upwards
۴۲	42	Razavi Khorasan^{2}	ن	**Jajarm**; Garmeh (In North Khorasan)	From [11 ن N 111 - 42] To [14 ن N 999 - 42] This letter was allocated to these counties in 2003 at a time when they were part of undivided Khorasan province. These counties became part of the new province of North Khorasan, which was allocated a new Provincial code, **26**. Rest of this letter was over a transition period, reallocated.
۴۲	42	Razavi Khorasan^{2}	ن	**Jajarm**; Garmeh (In North Khorasan); **Sabzevar**; Davarzan; Joghatai; Joveyn; Khoshab; Sheshtamad	From [15 ن N 111 - 42] To [17 ن N 999 - 42] Shared between these North Khorasan counties and these Razavi Khorasan counties
۴۲	42	Razavi Khorasan^{2}	ن	**Sabzevar**; Davarzan; Joghatai; Joveyn; Khoshab; Sheshtamad	From [18 ن N 111 - 42] upwards The letter initially belonged to and is partially used by counties that became part of North Khorasan in 2004.
۴۲	42	Razavi Khorasan^{2}	و	**Maneh & Samalqan** (In North Khorasan)	From [11 و V 111 - 42] To [13 و V 999 - 42] This letter was allocated to these counties in 2003 at a time when they were part of undivided Khorasan province. These counties became part of the new province of North Khorasan, which was allocated a new Provincial code, **26**. Rest of this letter was over a transition period, reallocated.
۴۲	42	Razavi Khorasan^{2}	و	**Maneh & Samalqan** (In North Khorasan); **Mashhad**; Torqabeh/Shandiz	From [14 و V 111 - 42] To [18 و V 999 - 42] Shared between these North Khorasan counties and these Razavi Khorasan counties
۴۲	42	Razavi Khorasan^{2}	و	**Mashhad**; Torqabeh/Shandiz	From [19 و V 111 - 42] upwards The letter initially belonged to and is partially used by counties that became part of North Khorasan in 2004.
۴۲	42	Razavi Khorasan^{2}	هـ	**Sarbisheh** (In South Khorasan)	From [11 هـ H 111 - 42] To [12 هـ H 999 - 42] This letter was allocated to these counties in 2003 at a time when they were part of undivided Khorasan province. These counties became part of the new province of South Khorasan, which was allocated a new Provincial code, **52**. Rest of this letter was reallocated.
۴۲	42	Razavi Khorasan^{2}	هـ	**Mashhad**; Torqabeh/Shandiz	From [13 هـ H 111 - 42] upwards The letter initially belonged to and is partially used by counties that became part of South Khorasan in 2004.
۴۲	42	Razavi Khorasan^{2}	ی	**Kalat**	From [11 ی Y 111 - 42] To [21 ی Y 999 - 35]
۴۲	42	Razavi Khorasan^{2}	ی	**Kalat**; **Torbat-e Heydarieh**; Mahvelat; Zaveh	From [22 ی Y 111 - 42] upwards
۴۳	43	Isfahan	ب	**Faridan**; Buin Miandasht; Chadegan	
۴۳	43	Isfahan	ج	**Mobarakeh**	
۴۳	43	Isfahan	د	**Shahin Shahr & Meymeh**; Borkhar	
۴۳	43	Isfahan	س	**Aran o Bidgol**	
۴۳	43	Isfahan	ص	**Tiran & Karvan**	From [11 ص Ṣ 111 - 43] To [55 ص Ṣ 999 - 43]
۴۳	43	Isfahan	ص	**Tiran & Karvan**; **Najafabad**	From [56 ص Ṣ 111 - 43] upwards
۴۳	43	Isfahan	ط	**Mobarakeh**	
۴۳	43	Isfahan	ق	**Dehaqan**	
۴۳	43	Isfahan	ل	**Shahin Shahr & Meymeh**; Borkhar	
۴۳	43	Isfahan	م	**Najafabad**	
۴۳	43	Isfahan	ن	**Khomeinishahr**	
۴۳	43	Isfahan	و	**Kashan**	
۴۳	43	Isfahan	هـ	**Lenjan**	
۴۳	43	Isfahan	ی	**Falavarjan**	
۴۴	44	City of Tehran	ب ج د س ص ط ق ل م ن و هـ ی		For the purposes of vehicle registration, City of Tehran is treated as if it were an independent province
۴۵	45	Kerman	ب ج د س ص ط ق ل م ن و هـ	**Kerman**	
۴۶	46	Gilan	ب ج د س ص ط ق ل م ن و هـ ی	**Rasht**; Khomam	
۴۷	47	Markazi	ب ج د س ص ط ق ل م	**Arak**; Khondab	
۴۸	48	Bushehr	ب ج د س ص	**Bushehr**; Bushehr	
۴۹	49	Kohgiluyeh Boyer-Ahmad	ب ج د	**Boyer-Ahmad (Yasuj)**; Margown	
۴۹	49	Kohgiluyeh Boyer-Ahmad	ص	**Gachsaran**; Basht	
۴۹	49	Kohgiluyeh Boyer-Ahmad	ط	**Kohgiluyeh**; Charam; Landeh; Bahmai	
۴۹	49	Kohgiluyeh Boyer-Ahmad	ق	**Dena**	
۴۹	49	Kohgiluyeh Boyer-Ahmad	ل	**Gachsaran**; Basht	
Notes: 1. Bold county name indicates the original county. The rest of the counties that are not in bold, are counties that have separated from the original county, but are still under the same code and letter as the original county; 2. As noted in the right-hand column where appropriate, anomalies are observed with this Code, due to division of Khorasan province that occurred 1 year after the start of issuing this license plate format.

==== Provincial codes 50 to 59 ====
Private vehicle Provincial Code Allocation Table, codes 50 to 59
Code	Code (English)	Province	Letter	County	Notes
۵۰	50	City of Tehran	ب ج د س ص ط ق ل م ن و هـ ی		For the purposes of vehicle registration, City of Tehran is treated as if it were an independent Province
۵۱	51	Kurdistan	ب ج د س ص ط	**Sanandaj**	
۵۲	52	South Khorasan	ب ج د س	**Birjand**; Darmian; Khusf	
۵۲	52	South Khorasan	ص	**Qaenat**; Zirkuh	
۵۲	52	South Khorasan	ط	**Ferdows**; Boshruyeh; Sarayan	
۵۲	52	South Khorasan	ق	**Nehbandan**	
۵۲	52	South Khorasan	ل	**Sarbisheh**	
۵۳	53	Isfahan	ب ج د س ص	**Isfahan**; Harand; Jarqavieh; Kuhpayeh; Varzaneh	
۵۳	53	Isfahan	ط	**Shahreza**	
۵۳	53	Isfahan	ق ل	**Isfahan**; Harand; Jarqavieh; Kuhpayeh; Varzaneh	
۵۳	53	Isfahan	م	**Shahin Shahr & Meymeh**; Borkhar	
۵۳	53	Isfahan	ن	**Najafabad**	
۵۳	53	Isfahan	و	**Isfahan**; Harand; Jarqavieh; Kuhpayeh; Varzaneh	
۵۳	53	Isfahan	هـ	**Kashan**	
۵۳	53	Isfahan	ی	**Khomeinishahr**	
۵۴	54	Yazd	ب ج د س ص ط ق ل م ن و	**Yazd**	
۵۵	55	City of Tehran	ب ج د س ص ط ق ل م ن و هـ ی		For the purposes of vehicle registration, City of Tehran is treated as if it were an independent Province
۵۶	56	Gilan	ب	**Bandar-e Anzali**	
۵۶	56	Gilan	ج	**Lahijan**	
۵۶	56	Gilan	د	**Astara**	
۵۶	56	Gilan	س	**Talesh**	
۵۶	56	Gilan	ص	**Rudsar**	
۵۶	56	Gilan	ط	**Rubdar**	
۵۶	56	Gilan	ق	**Sowme'eh Sara**	
۵۶	56	Gilan	ل	**Fuman**	
۵۶	56	Gilan	م	**Langrud**	
۵۶	56	Gilan	ن	**Rezvanshahr**	
۵۶	56	Gilan	و	**Amlash**	
۵۶	56	Gilan	هـ	**Masal**	
۵۶	56	Gilan	ی	**Shaft**	
۵۷	57	Markazi	ب	**Saveh**	
۵۷	57	Markazi	ج	**Khomein**	
۵۷	57	Markazi	د	**Mahallat**	
۵۷	57	Markazi	س	**Tafresh**; Farahan	
۵۷	57	Markazi	ص	**Delijan**	
۵۷	57	Markazi	ط	**Ashtian**	
۵۷	57	Markazi	ق	**Shazand**	
۵۷	57	Markazi	ل	**Zarandieh**	
۵۷	57	Markazi	م	**Khomein**	
۵۷	57	Markazi	ن	**Komijan**	
۵۷	57	Markazi	و هـ	**Saveh**	
۵۸	58	Bushehr	ب	**Dashtestan**	
۵۸	58	Bushehr	ج	**Ganaveh**	
۵۸	58	Bushehr	د	**Kangan**; Asaluyeh	
۵۸	58	Bushehr	س	**Tangestan**	
۵۸	58	Bushehr	ص	**Dashti**	
۵۸	58	Bushehr	ط	**Dayyer**	
۵۸	58	Bushehr	ق	**Deylam**	
۵۸	58	Bushehr	ل	**Jam**	
۵۸	58	Bushehr	م	**Dashtestan**	
۵۹	59	Golestan	ب ج د س ص ط	**Gorgan**	
Notes: 1. Bold county name indicates the original county. The rest of the counties that are not in bold, are counties that have separated from the original county, but are still under the same code and letter as the original county

==== Provincial codes 60 to 69 ====
Private vehicle Provincial Code Allocation Table, codes 60 to 69
Code	Code (English)	Province	Letter	County	Notes
۶۰	60	City of Tehran	ب ج د س ص ط		For the purposes of vehicle registration, City of Tehran is treated as if it were an independent province
۶۱	61	Kurdistan	ب	**Saqqez**	
۶۱	61	Kurdistan	ج	**Bijar**	
۶۱	61	Kurdistan	د	**Baneh**	
۶۱	61	Kurdistan	س	**Qorveh**; Dehgolan	
۶۱	61	Kurdistan	ص	**Marivan**	
۶۱	61	Kurdistan	ط	**Divandarreh**	
۶۱	61	Kurdistan	ق	**Kamyaran**	
۶۱	61	Kurdistan	ل	**Sarvabad**	
۶۱	61	Kurdistan	م	**Saqqez**	
۶۱	61	Kurdistan	ن	**Qorveh**; Dehgolan	
۶۱	61	Kurdistan	و	**Marivan**	
۶۱	61	Kurdistan	هـ	**Baneh**	
۶۲	62	Mazandaran	ب ج د س ص ط ق	**Sari**; Miandorud	
۶۳	63	Fars	ب ج د س ص ط ق ل م ن و هـ ی	**Shiraz**; Kavar; Kharameh; Sarvestan; Zarqan	
۶۴	64	Yazd	ب	**Ardakan**	
۶۴	64	Yazd	ج	**Taft**	
۶۴	64	Yazd	د	**Meybod**	
۶۴	64	Yazd	س	**Bafq**; Behabad	
۶۴	64	Yazd	ص	**Mehriz**	
۶۴	64	Yazd	ط	**Abarkuh**	
۶۴	64	Yazd	ق	**Tabas** (In South Khorasan)	In 2001, Tabas County was transferred from undivided Khorasan province (divided in 2003) to Yazd province. The current license plate format was introduced in 2003. Tabas County was transferred to South Khorasan in 2012, but has retained Yazd Provincial code.
۶۴	64	Yazd	ل	**Khatam**; Marvast	
۶۴	64	Yazd	م	**Ashkezar**	
۶۵	65	Kerman	ب	**Rafsanjan**; Anar	
۶۵	65	Kerman	ج	**Bam**; Fahraj; Narmashir; Rigan	
۶۵	65	Kerman	د	**Sirjan**	
۶۵	65	Kerman	س	**Baft**; Arzuiyeh; Rabor	
۶۵	65	Kerman	ص	**Jiroft**	
۶۵	65	Kerman	ط	**Zarand**; Kuhbanan	
۶۵	65	Kerman	ق	**Kahnuj**; Faryab; Qaleh Ganj; Rudbar-e Jonub	
۶۵	65	Kerman	ل	**Shahr-e Babak**	
۶۵	65	Kerman	م	**Bardsir**	
۶۵	65	Kerman	ن	**Manujan**	
۶۵	65	Kerman	و	**Anbarabad**	
۶۵	65	Kerman	هـ	**Ravar**	
۶۵	65	Kerman	ی	**Rafsanjan**; Anar	
۶۶	66	City of Tehran	ب ج د س ص ط ق ل م ن و هـ ی		For the purposes of vehicle registration, City of Tehran is treated as if it were an independent province
۶۷	67	Isfahan	ب ج د س	**Isfahan**; Harand; Jarqavieh; Kuhpayeh; Varzaneh	
۶۷	67	Isfahan	ص	**Lenjan**	From [11 ص Ṣ 111 - 67] To [29 ص Ṣ 999 - 67]
۶۷	67	Isfahan	ص	**Lenjan**; **Falavarjan**	From [31 ص Ṣ 111 - 67] upwards
۶۷	67	Isfahan	ط	**Isfahan**; Harand; Jarqavieh; Kuhpayeh; Varzaneh	
۶۷	67	Isfahan	ق	**Shahin Shahr & Meymeh**; Borkhar	
۶۷	67	Isfahan	ل	**Isfahan**; Harand; Jarqavieh; Kuhpayeh; Varzaneh	
۶۷	67	Isfahan	م	**Najafabad**	
۶۷	67	Isfahan	ن و	**Isfahan**; Harand; Jarqavieh; Kuhpayeh; Varzaneh	
۶۸	68	Tehran/Alborz^{2}	ب ج د س ص ط ق ل م ن و هـ ی	**Karaj**; Fardis; Eshtehard	
۶۹	69	Golestan	ب	**Gonbad-e Kavus**	
۶۹	69	Golestan	ج	**Torkaman**; Gomishan	
۶۹	69	Golestan	د	**Kordkuy**	
۶۹	69	Golestan	س	**Aliabad**	
۶۹	69	Golestan	ص	**Azadshahr**	
۶۹	69	Golestan	ط	**Minudasht**; Galikash	
۶۹	69	Golestan	ق	**Bandar-e Gaz**	
۶۹	69	Golestan	ل	**Ramian**	
۶۹	69	Golestan	م	**Aqqala**	
۶۹	69	Golestan	ن	**Kalaleh**; Maraveh Tappeh	
۶۹	69	Golestan	و هـ	**Gonbad-e Kavus**	
Notes: 1. Bold county name indicates the original county. The rest of the counties that are not in bold, are counties that have separated from the original county, but are still under the same code and letter as the original county; 2. Tehran and Alborz provinces are treated as if they are one united province, for the purpose of assigning Provincial license plate codes.

==== Provincial codes 70 to 79 ====
Private vehicle provincial Code Allocation table, codes 70 to 79
Code	Code (English)	Province	Letter	County	Notes
۷۰	70	Code not allocated yet			
۷۱	71	Chaharmahal and Bakhtiari	ب ج د س ص ط	**Shahrekord**; Ben; Kiar; Saman	
۷۲	72	Mazandaran	ب	**Amol**	
۷۲	72	Mazandaran	ج	**Babol**	
۷۲	72	Mazandaran	د	**Tonekabon**; Abbasabad	
۷۲	72	Mazandaran	س	**Ramsar**	
۷۲	72	Mazandaran	ص	**Nowshahr**	
۷۲	72	Mazandaran	ط	**Nur**	
۷۲	72	Mazandaran	ق	**Behshahr**; Galugah	
۷۲	72	Mazandaran	ل	**Qaem Shahr**; Simorgh	
۷۲	72	Mazandaran	م	**Babolsar**; Fereydunkenar	
۷۲	72	Mazandaran	ن	**Chalus**; Kelardasht	
۷۲	72	Mazandaran	و	**Mahmudabad**	
۷۲	72	Mazandaran	هـ	**Neka**	
۷۲	72	Mazandaran	ی	**Juybar**	From [11 ی Y 111 - 72] To [59 ی Y 999 - 72]
۷۲	72	Mazandaran	ی	**Juybar**; **Nur**	From [61 ی Y 111 - 72] upwards
۷۳	73	Fars	ب	**Jahrom**; Khafr	
۷۳	73	Fars	ج	**Larestan**; Evaz; Gerash; Khonj	
۷۳	73	Fars	د	**Darab**	
۷۳	73	Fars	س	**Fasa**	
۷۳	73	Fars	ص	**Kazerun**; Kuh-Chenar	
۷۳	73	Fars	ط	**Firuzabad**	
۷۳	73	Fars	ق	**Abadeh**	
۷۳	73	Fars	ل	**Marvdasht**; Pasargad	
۷۳	73	Fars	م	**Lamerd**	
۷۳	73	Fars	ن	**Neyriz**; Bakhtegan	
۷۳	73	Fars	و	**Estahban**	
۷۳	73	Fars	هـ	**Eqlid**	
۷۳	73	Fars	ی	**Sepidan**; Beyza	From [11 ی Y 111 - 73] To [51 ی Y 999 - 73]
۷۳	73	Fars	ی	**Sepidan**; Beyza; **Mamasani**; Rostam	From [52 ی Y 111 - 73] upwards
۷۴	74	Razavi Khorasan	ب د س ص ق م ن و هـ ی	**Mashhad**; Torqabeh/Shandiz	
۷۴	74	Razavi Khorasan	ج	**Quchan**	
۷۴	74	Razavi Khorasan	ط	**Neyshabur**; Firuzeh; Zeberkhan	
۷۴	74	Razavi Khorasan	ل	**Sabzevar**; Davarzan; Joghatai; Joveyn; Khoshab; Sheshtamad	
۷۵	75	Kerman	ب	**Sirjan**	
۷۵	75	Kerman	ج	**Bam**; Fahraj; Narmashir; Rigan	
۷۵	75	Kerman	د	**Jiroft**	
۷۵	75	Kerman	س	**Rafsanjan**; Anar	
۷۵	75	Kerman	ص	**Sirjan**	
۷۵	75	Kerman	ط	**Zarand**; Kuhbanan	
۷۵	75	Kerman	ق	**Kahnuj**; Faryab; Qaleh Ganj; Rudbar-e Jonub	
۷۵	75	Kerman	ل	**Rafsanjan**; Anar	
۷۵	75	Kerman	م	**Sirjan**	
۷۶	76	Gilan	ب	**Siahkal**	
۷۶	76	Gilan	ج	**Astaneh-ye Ashrafiyeh**	
۷۶	76	Gilan	د	**Lahijan**	
۷۶	76	Gilan	س	**Bandar-e Anzali**	
۷۶	76	Gilan	ص	**Langrud**	
۷۶	76	Gilan	ط	**Talesh**	
۷۶	76	Gilan	ق	**Rudsar**	
۷۷	77	City of Tehran	ب ج د س ص ط ق ل م ن و هـ ی		For the purposes of vehicle registration, City of Tehran is treated as if it were an independent province
۷۸	78	Tehran/Alborz^{2}	ب	**Eslamshahr**	
۷۸	78	Tehran/Alborz^{2}	ج	**Robat Karim**; Baharestan	
۷۸	78	Tehran/Alborz^{2}	د	**Shahriar**; Malard; Qods	
۷۸	78	Tehran/Alborz^{2}	س	**Varamin**; Pishva; Qarchack	
۷۸	78	Tehran/Alborz^{2}	ص	**Damavand**; Pardis	
۷۸	78	Tehran/Alborz^{2}	ط	**Savojbolagh**; Taleqan; Nazarabad	
۷۸	78	Tehran/Alborz^{2}	ق	**Firuzkuh**	
۷۸	78	Tehran/Alborz^{2}	ل	**Pakdasht**	
۷۸	78	Tehran/Alborz^{2}	م	**Robat Karim**; Baharestan	
۷۸	78	Tehran/Alborz^{2}	ن	**Ray**	Except for areas under Tehran City, District 20
۷۸	78	Tehran/Alborz^{2}	و	**Shemiranat**	Except for areas under Tehran City, District 1
۷۸	78	Tehran/Alborz^{2}	هـ	**Shahriar**; Malard; Qods	
۷۸	78	Tehran/Alborz^{2}	ی	**Eslamshahr**	
۷۹	79	Qazvin	ب ج د س ص ط ق ل م ن	**Qazvin**; Alborz	
Notes: 1. Bold county name indicates the original county. The rest of the counties that are not in bold, are counties that have separated from the original county, but are still under the same code and letter as the original county; 2. Tehran and Alborz provinces are treated as if they are one united province, for the purpose of assigning Provincial license plate codes.

==== Provincial codes 80 to 89 ====
Private Vehicle Provincial Code Allocation Table, codes 80 to 89
Code	Code (English)	Province	Letter	County	Notes
۸۰	80	Code not allocated yet			
۸۱	81	Chaharmahal and Bakhtiari	ب	**Borujen**	
۸۱	81	Chaharmahal and Bakhtiari	ج	**Ardal**	
۸۱	81	Chaharmahal and Bakhtiari	د	**Farsan**	
۸۱	81	Chaharmahal and Bakhtiari	س	**Lordegan**; Khanmirza	
۸۱	81	Chaharmahal and Bakhtiari	ص	**Kuhrang**	
۸۱	81	Chaharmahal and Bakhtiari	ق	**Borujen**	
۸۲	82	Mazandaran	ب	**Savadkuh**; **North Savadkuh**	
۸۲	82	Mazandaran	ج	**Babol**	
۸۲	82	Mazandaran	د	**Amol**	
۸۲	82	Mazandaran	س	**Qaem Shahr**; Simorgh	
۸۲	82	Mazandaran	ص	**Babol**	
۸۲	82	Mazandaran	ط	**Tonekabon**; Abbasabad	
۸۲	82	Mazandaran	ق	**Amol**	
۸۲	82	Mazandaran	ل	**Babolsar**; Fereydunkenar	
۸۲	82	Mazandaran	م	**Babol**	
۸۲	82	Mazandaran	ن	**Qaem Shahr**; Simorgh	
۸۲	82	Mazandaran	و	**Chalus**; Kelardasht	
۸۲	82	Mazandaran	هـ	**Behshahr**; Galugah	
۸۲	82	Mazandaran	ی	**Nowshahr**	
۸۳	83	Fars	ب	**Mamasani**; Rostam	
۸۳	83	Fars	ج	**Zarrin Dasht**	From [11 ج J 111 - 83] To [41 ج J 999 - 83]
۸۳	83	Fars	ج	**Zarrin Dasht**; **Arsanjan**; **Firuzabad**; **Kazerun**; **Marvdasht**; Pasargad; **Shiraz**; Kavar; Kharameh; Sarvestan; Zarqan; Kuh-Chenar	From [42 ج J 111 - 83] upwards
۸۳	83	Fars	د	**Qir va Karzin**	
۸۳	83	Fars	س	**Mohr**	From [11 س S 111 - 83] To [38 س S 999 - 83]
۸۳	83	Fars	س	**Mohr**; **Darab**	From [39 س S 111 - 83] upwards
۸۳	83	Fars	ص	**Arsanjan**	From [11 ص Ṣ 111 - 83] To [35 ص Ṣ 999 - 83]
۸۳	83	Fars	ص	**Arsanjan**; **Firuzabad**; **Kazerun**; **Marvdasht**; Pasargad; **Shiraz**; Kavar; Kharameh; Sarvestan; Zarqan; Kuh-Chenar	From [39 ص Ṣ 111 - 83] upwards
۸۳	83	Fars	ط	**Khorrambid**	
۸۳	83	Fars	ق	**Bavanat**; Sarchehan	From [11 ق Q 111 - 83] To [33 ق Q 999 - 83]
۸۳	83	Fars	ق	**Bavanat**; Sarchehan; **Abadeh**	From [34 ق Q 111 - 83] upwards
۸۳	83	Fars	ل	**Farashband**	
۸۳	83	Fars	م	**Larestan**; Evaz; Gerash; Khonj	
۸۳	83	Fars	ن	**Kazerun**; Kuh-Chenar	
۸۳	83	Fars	و	**Marvdasht**; Pasargad	
۸۳	83	Fars	هـ	**Jahrom**; Khafr	
۸۳	83	Fars	ی	**Fasa**	
۸۴	84	Hormozgan	ب ج د س ص ط ق ل م	**Bandar Abbas**; Khamir	
۸۵	85	Sistan and Baluchestan	ب ج د س ص ط ق	**Zahedan**; Mirjaveh	
۸۶	86	Semnan	ب ج د	**Semnan**; Sorkheh	
۸۷	87	Zanjan	ب ج د س ص ط ق	**Zanjan**	
۸۸	88	City of Tehran	ب ج د س ص ط ق ل م ن و هـ ی		For the purposes of vehicle registration, City of Tehran is treated as if it were an independent Province
۸۹	89	Qazvin	ب	**Takestan**	
۸۹	89	Qazvin	ج	**Buin Zahra**; Avaj	
۸۹	89	Qazvin	د	**Abyek**	
۸۹	89	Qazvin	س	**Takestan**	
Notes: 1. Bold county name indicates the original county. The rest of the counties that are not in bold, are counties that have separated from the original county, but are still under the same code and letter as the original county

==== Provincial codes 90 to 99 ====
Private Vehicle Provincial Code Allocation Table, codes 90 to 99
Code	Code (English)	Province	Letter	County	Notes
۹۰	90	Code not allocated yet			
۹۱	91	Ardabil	ب ج د	**Ardabil**; Sareyn	
۹۱	91	Ardabil	س	**Parsabad**; Aslan Duz	
۹۱	91	Ardabil	ص	**Khalkhal**	
۹۱	91	Ardabil	ط	**Germi**; Ungut	
۹۱	91	Ardabil	ق	**Meshgin Shahr**	
۹۱	91	Ardabil	ل	**Bileh Savar**	
۹۱	91	Ardabil	م	**Nir**	From [11 م M 111 - 91] To [16 م M 999 - 91]
۹۱	91	Ardabil	م	**Nir**; **Ardabil**; Sareyn; **Kowsar**; **Parsabad**; Aslan Duz	From [17 م M 111 - 91] upwards
۹۱	91	Ardabil	ن	**Namin**	From [11 ن N 111 - 91] To [23 ن N 999 - 91]
۹۱	91	Ardabil	ن	**Namin**; **Meshgin Shahr**	From [24 ن N 111 - 91] upwards
۹۱	91	Ardabil	و	**Kowsar**	From [11 و V 111 - 91] To [18 و V 999 - 91]
۹۱	91	Ardabil	و	**Kowsar**; **Ardabil**; Sareyn; **Parsabad**; Aslan Duz	From [19 و V 111 - 91] upwards
۹۱	91	Ardabil	هـ	**Ardabil**; Sareyn	
۹۱	91	Ardabil	ی	**Ardabil**; Sareyn	From [11 ی Y 111 - 91] To [75 ی Y 999 - 91]
۹۱	91	Ardabil	ی	**Ardabil**; Sareyn; **Parsabad**; Aslan Duz	From [76 ی Y 111 - 91] upwards
۹۲	92	Mazandaran	ب	**Amol**	
۹۲	92	Mazandaran	ج	**Babol**	
۹۲	92	Mazandaran	د	**Tonekabon**; Abbasabad	
۹۲	92	Mazandaran	س	**Qaem Shahr**; Simorgh	
۹۲	92	Mazandaran	ص	**Babol**	
۹۳	93	Fars	ب ج د س ص ط ق	**Shiraz**; Kavar; Kharameh; Sarvestan; Zarqan	
۹۳	93	Fars	ل	**Larestan**; Evaz; Gerash; Khonj	
۹۳	93	Fars	م ن	**Shiraz**; Kavar; Kharameh; Sarvestan; Zarqan	
۹۳	93	Fars	و	**Marvdasht**; Pasargad	From [11 و V 111 - 93] To [39 و V 999 - 93]
۹۳	93	Fars	و	**Marvdasht**; Pasargad; **Kazerun**; Kuh-Chenar; **Shiraz**; Kavar; Kharameh; Sarvestan; Zarqan	From [41 و V 111 - 93] To [95 و V 999 - 93]
۹۳	93	Fars	و	**Marvdasht**; Pasargad; **Kazerun**; Kuh-Chenar; **Shiraz**; Kavar; Kharameh; Sarvestan; Zarqan; **Firuzabad**	From [96 و V 111 - 93] upwards
۹۳	93	Fars	هـ	**Shiraz**; Kavar; Kharameh; Sarvestan; Zarqan	
۹۳	93	Fars	ی	**Kazerun**; Kuh-Chenar	From [11 ی Y 111 - 93] To [16 ی Y 999 - 93]
۹۳	93	Fars	ی	**Kazerun**; Kuh-Chenar; **Shiraz**; Kavar; Kharameh; Sarvestan; Zarqan	From [17 ی Y 111 - 93] upwards
۹۴	94	Hormozgan	ب	**Minab**; Sirik	
۹۴	94	Hormozgan	ج	**Bandar Lengeh**; Parsian	
۹۴	94	Hormozgan	د	**Rudan**	
۹۴	94	Hormozgan	س	**Abumusa**	
۹۴	94	Hormozgan	ص	**Jask**; Bashagard	
۹۴	94	Hormozgan	ط	**Bastak**	
۹۴	94	Hormozgan	ق	**Hajjiabad**	
۹۴	94	Hormozgan	ل	**Qeshm**	
۹۴	94	Hormozgan	م	**Minab**; Sirik	
۹۴	94	Hormozgan	ن	**Bandar Lengeh**; Parsian	
۹۵	95	Sistan and Baluchestan	ب	**Zabol**; Hamun; Hirmand; Nimruz; Zehak	
۹۵	95	Sistan and Baluchestan	ج	**Iranshahr**; Bampur; Dalgan	
۹۵	95	Sistan and Baluchestan	د	**Khash**; Taftan	
۹۵	95	Sistan and Baluchestan	س	**Saravan**; Golshan; Mehrestan; Sib and Suran	
۹۵	95	Sistan and Baluchestan	ص	**Nik Shahr**; Fanuj; Qasr-e Qand	
۹۵	95	Sistan and Baluchestan	ط	**Sarbaz**; Rask	
۹۵	95	Sistan and Baluchestan	ق	**Chabahar**; Dashtiari; Konarak	
۹۵	95	Sistan and Baluchestan	ل	**Zabol**; Hamun; Hirmand; Nimruz; Zehak	
۹۵	95	Sistan and Baluchestan	م	**Iranshahr**; Bampur; Dalgan	
۹۵	95	Sistan and Baluchestan	ن	**Saravan**; Golshan; Mehrestan; Sib and Suran	
۹۵	95	Sistan and Baluchestan	و	**Zabol**; Hamun; Hirmand; Nimruz; Zehak	
۹۶	96	Semnan	ب	**Damghan**	
۹۶	96	Semnan	ج	**Shahrud**; Meyami	
۹۶	96	Semnan	د	**Garmsar**; Aradan	
۹۶	96	Semnan	س	**Mehdishahr**	
۹۶	96	Semnan	ص ط	**Shahrud**; Meyami	
۹۷	97	Zanjan	ب	**Abhar**; Soltaniyeh	
۹۷	97	Zanjan	ج	**Khodabandeh**	
۹۷	97	Zanjan	د	**Khorramdarreh**	
۹۷	97	Zanjan	س	**Ijrud**	
۹۷	97	Zanjan	ص	**Tarom**	
۹۷	97	Zanjan	ط	**Mahneshan**	
۹۷	97	Zanjan	ق	**Abhar**; Soltaniyeh	
۹۸	98	Ilam	ب ج د س	**Ilam**; Chavar	
۹۸	98	Ilam	ص	**Mehran**; Malekshahi	
۹۸	98	Ilam	ط	**Darreh Shahr**; Badreh	
۹۸	98	Ilam	ق	**Dehloran**	
۹۸	98	Ilam	ل	**Chardavol**; Holeylan; Sirvan	
۹۸	98	Ilam	م	**Eyvan**	
۹۸	98	Ilam	ن	**Abdanan**	
۹۹	99	City of Tehran	ب ج د س ص ط ق ل م ن و هـ ی		For the purposes of vehicle registration, City of Tehran is treated as if it were an independent Province
Notes: 1. Bold county name indicates the original county. The rest of the counties that are not in bold, are counties that have separated from the original county, but are still under the same code and letter as the original county

== Motorcycles ==
Motorcycle registration plates have a unique and different format. Motorcycle plates come in XXX - #####. XXX is a three-digit provincial code, followed by #####, a five-digit number. These license plates are issued provincially.

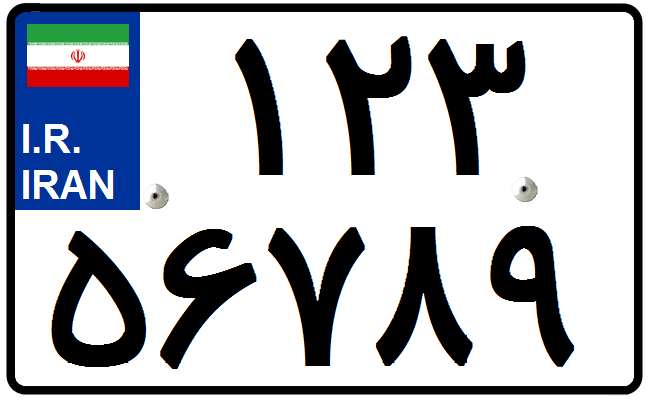

Below is a list of codes and their corresponding provinces.

Note that neither the three-digit provincial code, nor the five-digit registration number can take zero. Thus, for example, after provincial code 499, comes provincial code 511.

Code	Province	Number of allocated codes
111 to 143	City of Tehran^{1}	30
319 to 324	Tehran/Alborz^{2}	5
371 to 377	West Azerbaijan	7
391 to 398	East Azerbaijan	8
442 to 443	Ardabil	2
461 to 462	Kordestan	2
479 to 482	Zanjan	3
498 to 511	Hamedan	3
514 to 517	Kermanshah	4
523 to 525	Qazvin	3
531 to 537	Markazi	7
538 to 543	Lorestan	5
547	Ilam	1
555	Chaharmahal and Bakhtiari	1
563 to 569	Khuzestan	8*
571	Kohgiluyeh and Boyer-Ahmad	1
578 to 583	Gilan	5
586 to 589	Mazandaran	4
596 to 597	Golestan	2
611 to 615	Qom	5
618 to 635	Isfahan	16
637 to 643	Yazd	6
687 to 698	Fars	11
751 to 754	Semnan	4
761 to 778	Razavi Khorasan	18
785 to 786	North Khorasan	2
791 to 792	South Khorasan	2
812 to 817	Kerman	6
819 to 823	Sistan and Baluchestan	3
827 to 831	Bushehr	4
835 to 839	Hormozgan	5
851	Khuzestan	8*
Notes: 1. For the purposes of vehicle registration, City of Tehran is treated as if it were an independent Province.; 2. Tehran and Alborz provinces are treated as if they are one united province, for the purpose of assigning Provincial license plate codes.; 3. * indicates that not all of the province's allocated numbers are not sequential.

== Free trade zones ==
The plate is black on white and consists of a five-digit number written once in Persian digits on the top and in Western Arabic digits on the bottom. On the left, there is an Iranian flag and the logo of the respective free trade zone with its name written in English below it.

The size of the plate is American standard.

Below are a few examples of these plates.

=== Anzali ===
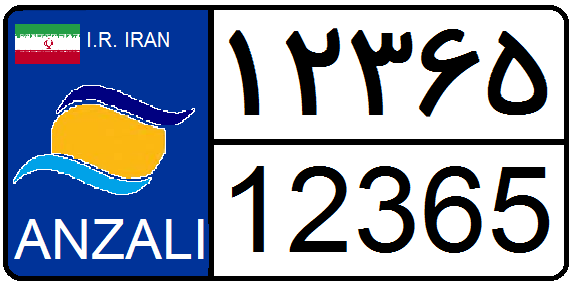

=== Aras ===
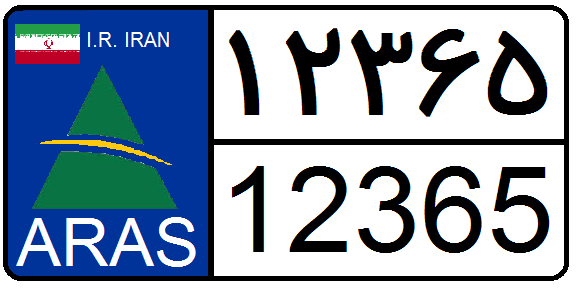

=== Arvand ===
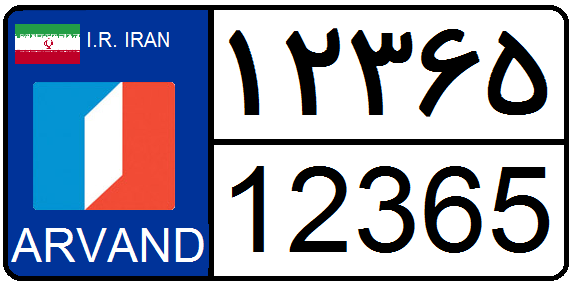

=== Kish ===
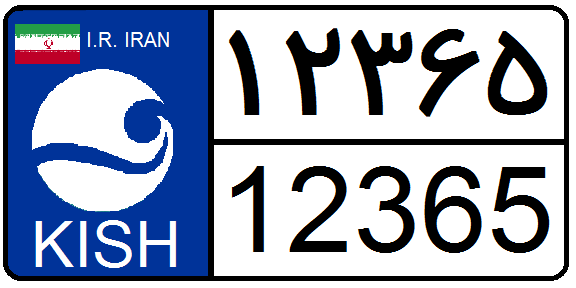

=== Maku ===
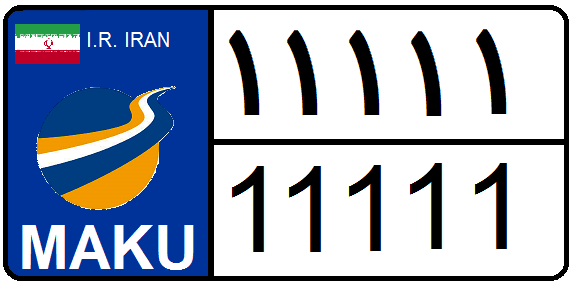

=== Chabahar ===
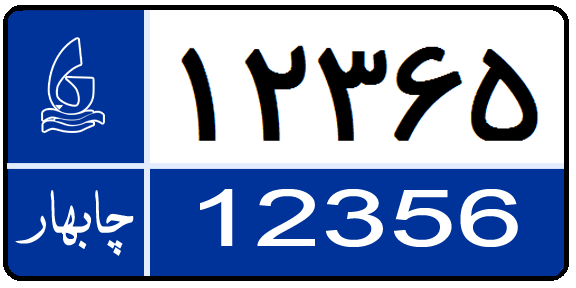

=== Qeshm ===
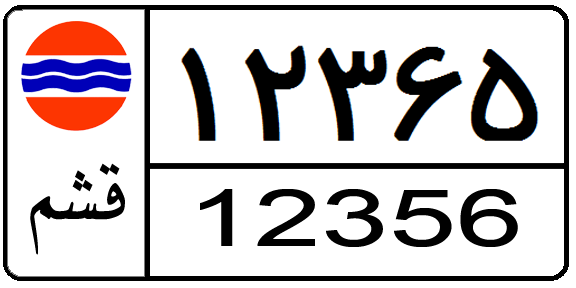
