= Band-e Amir Rural District =

Rural district in Fars province, Iran

Band-e Amir Rural District Persian: دهستان بند امير
- Rural District
- Location within Iran
- Coordinates: 29°43′09″N 52°50′54″E
- Country: Iran
- Province: Fars
- County: Zarqan
- District: Central
- Capital: Band-e Amir

Population (2016)
  - Total: 7,554
- Time zone: UTC+3:30 (IRST)

Band-e Amir Rural District (Persian: دهستان بند امير) is in the Central District of Zarqan County, Fars province, Iran. Its capital is the village of Band-e Amir.

== Demographics ==
=== Population ===
At the time of the 2006 National Census, the rural district's population (as a part of the former Zarqan District of Shiraz County) was 9,085 in 2,205 households. There were 8,289 inhabitants in 2,268 households at the following census of 2011. The 2016 census measured the population of the rural district as 7,554 in 2,188 households. The most populous of its 39 villages was Shul, with 2,438 people.

In 2018, the district was separated from the county in the establishment of Zarqan County, and the rural district was transferred to the new Central District.
