= Zarqan District =

Former district in Fars province, Iran

Zarqan District Persian: بخش زرقان
- Former District
- Location within Iran
- Coordinates: 29°44′N 52°49′E
- Country: Iran
- Province: Fars
- County: Shiraz
- Capital: Zarqan

Population (2016)
  - Total: 56,104
- Time zone: UTC+3:30 (IRST)

Zarqan District (Persian: بخش زرقان) is a former administrative division of Shiraz County, Fars province, Iran. Its capital was the city of Zarqan.

== History ==
After the 2016 National Census, the district was separated from the county in the establishment of Zarqan County.

== Demographics ==
=== Population ===
At the time of the 2006 census, the district's population was 46,672 in 11,815 households. The following census in 2011 counted 52,065 people in 14,240 households. The 2016 census measured the population of the district as 56,104 inhabitants in 16,672 households.

=== Administrative divisions ===
Zarqan District Population
Administrative Divisions	2006	2011	2016
Band-e Amir Rural District	9,085	8,289	7,554
Rahmatabad RD	6,597	6,168	6,212
Zarqan RD	6,154	1,726	1,092
Lapui (city)	4,975	6,924	8,985
Zarqan (city)	19,861	28,958	32,261
Total	46,672	52,065	56,104
RD = Rural District
