= Eshratabad =

Eshratabad or Ashratabad (Persian: عشرت اباد) may refer to:

- Eshratabad Palace in Tehran
- Eshratabad, Isfahan
- Eshratabad, Kerman
- Eshratabad, Qazvin
- Eshratabad, Kashmar, Razavi Khorasan Province
- Eshratabad, Nishapur, Razavi Khorasan Province
- Eshratabad, Miyan Jolgeh, Nishapur County, Razavi Khorasan Province
- Eshratabad, Rashtkhvar, Razavi Khorasan Province
- Eshratabad, Sabzevar, Razavi Khorasan Province
