= Band-e Sar, Qazvin =

Band-e Sar بندسر
- Village
- Location within Iran
- Coordinates: 35°44′17″N 49°41′05″E
- Country: Iran
- Province: Qazvin
- County: Buin Zahra
- Bakhsh: Ramand
- Rural District: Ramand-e Jonubi

Population (2006)
  - Total: 188
- Time zone: UTC+3:30 (IRST)
  - Summer (DST): UTC+4:30 (IRDT)

Band-e Sar (Persian: بندسر) is a village in Ramand-e Jonubi Rural District, Ramand District, Buin Zahra County, Qazvin Province, Iran. At the 2006 census, its population was 188, in 45 families.
