= Khunan =

Village in Qazvin province, Iran

Khunan Persian: خونان
- Village
- Location within Iran
- Coordinates: 35°47′23″N 50°05′13″E
- Country: Iran
- Province: Qazvin
- County: Buin Zahra
- District: Central
- Rural District: Zahray-ye Bala

Population (2016)
  - Total: 2,423
- Time zone: UTC+3:30 (IRST)

Khunan (Persian: خونان) (Note: Also romanized as Khownān and Khūnān; also known as Khūshān) is a village in Zahray-ye Bala Rural District of the Central District in Buin Zahra County, Qazvin province, Iran.

== Demographics ==
=== Population ===
At the time of the 2006 National Census, the village's population was 1,737 in 457 households. The following census in 2011 counted 2,360 people in 683 households. The 2016 census measured the population of the village as 2,423 people in 726 households.
