= Morad Beyglu =

Village in Qazvin province, Iran

Morad Beyglu Persian: مرادبيگلو
- Village
- Location within Iran
- Coordinates: 35°42′19″N 49°39′27″E
- Country: Iran
- Province: Qazvin
- County: Buin Zahra
- District: Ramand
- Rural District: Ramand-e Jonubi

Population (2016)
  - Total: 240
- Time zone: UTC+3:30 (IRST)

Morad Beyglu (Persian: مرادبيگلو) (Note: Also romanized as Morād Beyglū; also known as Morād Peglū, Mordā Beglū, Mūrāb, and Murād Beli) is a village in Ramand-e Jonubi Rural District of Ramand District in Buin Zahra County, Qazvin province, Iran.

== Demographics ==
=== Population ===
At the time of the 2006 National Census, the village's population was 208 in 42 households. The following census in 2011 counted 137 people in 35 households. The 2016 census measured the population of the village as 240 people in 64 households.
