= Valadabad =

Village in Qazvin province, Iran

Valadabad Persian: ولداباد
- Village
- Location within Iran
- Coordinates: 35°56′50″N 49°55′56″E
- Country: Iran
- Province: Qazvin
- County: Buin Zahra
- District: Central
- Rural District: Zahray-ye Bala

Population (2016)
  - Total: 656
- Time zone: UTC+3:30 (IRST)

Valadabad (Persian: ولداباد) (Note: Also romanized as Valadābād and Waladābād) is a village in Zahray-ye Bala Rural District of the Central District in Buin Zahra County, Qazvin province, Iran.

== Demographics ==
=== Population ===
At the time of the 2006 National Census, the village's population was 808 in 222 households. The following census in 2011 counted 859 people in 253 households. The 2016 census measured the population of the village as 656 people in 209 households.
