= Sakhsabad =

Village in Qazvin province, Iran

Sakhsabad Persian: سخس آباد
- Village
- Location within Iran
- Coordinates: 35°56′52″N 49°53′39″E
- Country: Iran
- Province: Qazvin
- County: Buin Zahra
- District: Shal
- Rural District: Zeynabad

Population (2016)
  - Total: 1,087
- Time zone: UTC+3:30 (IRST)

Sakhsabad (Persian: سخس آباد) (Note: Also romanized as Sakhsābād) is a village in Zeynabad Rural District of Shal District (Note: Formerly known as Dashtabi District) in Buin Zahra County, Qazvin province, Iran.

== Demographics ==
=== Population ===
At the time of the 2006 National Census, the village's population was 259 in 56 households. The following census in 2011 counted 1,035 people in 256 households. The 2016 census measured the population of the village as 1,087 people in 292 households.
