= Zeynabad, Qazvin =

Village in Qazvin province, Iran

Zeynabad Persian: زين اباد
- Village
- Location within Iran
- Coordinates: 35°54′53″N 49°52′26″E
- Country: Iran
- Province: Qazvin
- County: Buin Zahra
- District: Shal
- Rural District: Zeynabad

Population (2016)
  - Total: 1,697
- Time zone: UTC+3:30 (IRST)

Zeynabad (Persian: زين اباد) (Note: Also romanized as Zeīn Abad and Zeynābād) is a village in, and the capital of, Zeynabad Rural District in Shal District (Note: Formerly known as Dashtabi District) of Buin Zahra County, Qazvin province, Iran.

== Demographics ==
=== Population ===
At the time of the 2006 National Census, the village's population was 1,611 in 372 households. The following census in 2011 counted 1,647 people in 451 households. The 2016 census measured the population of the village as 1,697 people in 491 households. It was the most populous village in its rural district.
