= Abdol Robababad =

Village in Qazvin province, Iran

Abdol Robababad Persian: عبدالرباب اباد
- Village
- Location within Iran
- Coordinates: 35°57′45″N 49°50′58″E
- Country: Iran
- Province: Qazvin
- County: Buin Zahra
- District: Shal
- Rural District: Zeynabad

Population (2016)
  - Total: 175
- Time zone: UTC+3:30 (IRST)

Abdol Robababad (Persian: عبدالرباب اباد) (Note: Also romanized as ‘Abd ol Robābābād and ‘Abdol Robābābād) is a village in Zeynabad Rural District of Shal District (Note: Formerly known as Dashtabi District) in Buin Zahra County, Qazvin province, Iran.

== Demographics ==
=== Population ===
At the time of the 2006 National Census, the village's population was 144 in 27 households. The following census in 2011 counted 297 people in 80 households. The 2016 census measured the population of the village as 175 people in 50 households.
