= Sadrabad, Qazvin =

Village in Qazvin province, Iran

Sadrabad Persian: صدراباد
- Village
- Location within Iran
- Coordinates: 35°49′12″N 50°04′05″E
- Country: Iran
- Province: Qazvin
- County: Buin Zahra
- District: Central
- Rural District: Zahray-ye Bala

Population (2016)
  - Total: 819
- Time zone: UTC+3:30 (IRST)

Sadrabad (Persian: صدراباد) (Note: Also romanized as Şadrābād) is a village in Zahray-ye Bala Rural District of the Central District in Buin Zahra County, Qazvin province, Iran.

== Demographics ==
=== Population ===
At the time of the 2006 National Census, the village's population was 867 in 228 households. The following census in 2011 counted 831 people in 248 households. The 2016 census measured the population of the village as 819 people in 261 households.
