= Khiaraj =

Village in Qazvin province, Iran

Khiaraj Persian: خيارج
- Village
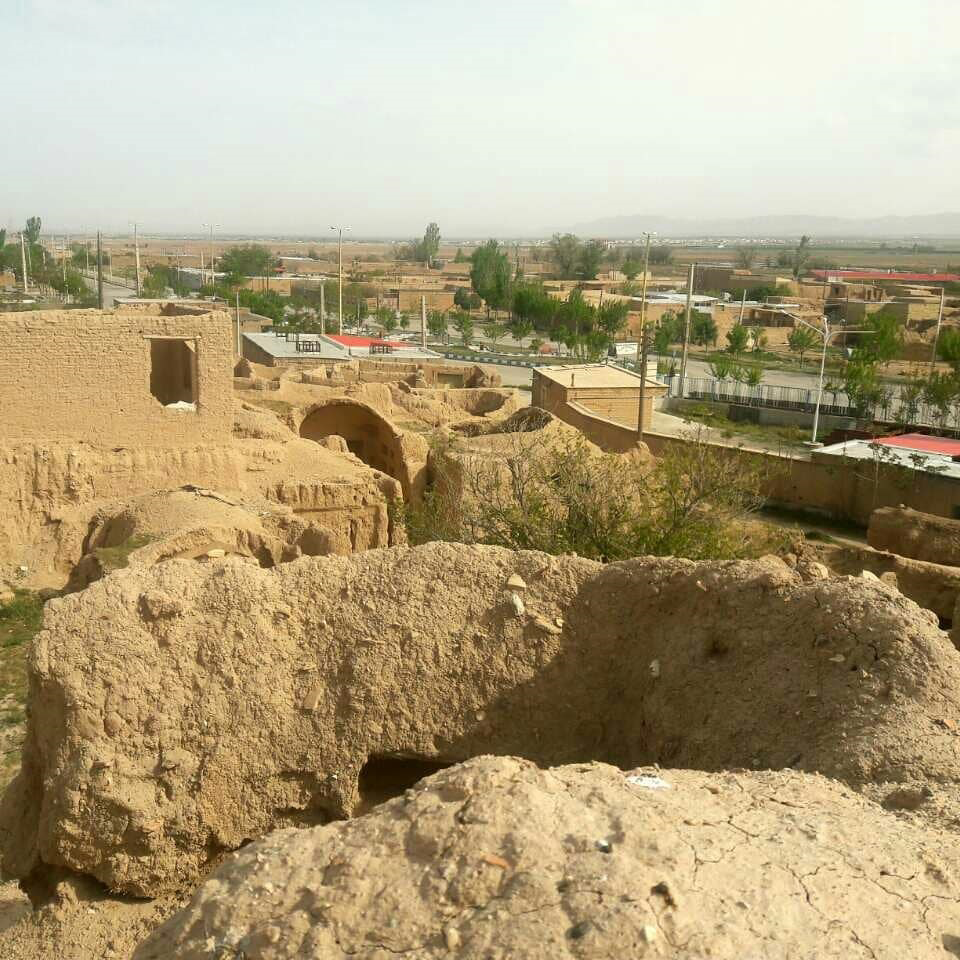

- Location within Iran
- Coordinates: 35°51′08″N 49°43′07″E
- Country: Iran
- Province: Qazvin
- County: Buin Zahra
- District: Ramand
- Rural District: Ramand-e Jonubi

Population (2016)
  - Total: 764
- Time zone: UTC+3:30 (IRST)

Khiaraj (Persian: خيارج) (Note: Also romanized as Khīāraj and Khīyaraj) is a village in Ramand-e Jonubi Rural District of Ramand District in Buin Zahra County, Qazvin province, Iran.

== Demographics ==
=== Population ===
At the time of the 2006 National Census, the village's population was 1,195 in 334 households. The following census in 2011 counted 1,007 people in 318 households. The 2016 census measured the population of the village as 764 people in 257 households.
