= Rahimabad, Buin Zahra =

Village in Qazvin province, Iran

Rahimabad Persian: رحيم اباد
- Village
- Location within Iran
- Coordinates: 35°45′55″N 50°08′13″E
- Country: Iran
- Province: Qazvin
- County: Buin Zahra
- District: Central
- Rural District: Zahray-ye Pain

Population (2016)
  - Total: 624
- Time zone: UTC+3:30 (IRST)

Rahimabad (Persian: رحيم اباد) (Note: Also romanized as Raḩīmābād) is a village in, and the capital of, Zahray-ye Pain Rural District in the Central District of Buin Zahra County, Qazvin province, Iran.

== Demographics ==
=== Population ===
At the time of the 2006 National Census, the village's population was 671 in 150 households. The following census in 2011 counted 646 people in 170 households. The 2016 census measured the population of the village as 624 people in 180 households.
