= Suravjin =

Village in Qazvin province, Iran

Suravjin Persian: سوراوجين
- Village
- Location within Iran
- Coordinates: 35°45′48″N 49°40′53″E
- Country: Iran
- Province: Qazvin
- County: Buin Zahra
- District: Ramand
- Rural District: Ramand-e Jonubi

Population (2016)
  - Total: 173
- Time zone: UTC+3:30 (IRST)

Suravjin (Persian: سوراوجين) (Note: Also romanized as Sūrāvajīn and Sūrāvjīn; also known as Surābak and Sūrāwej) is a village in Ramand-e Jonubi Rural District of Ramand District in Buin Zahra County, Qazvin province, Iran.

== Demographics ==
=== Population ===
At the time of the 2006 National Census, the village's population was 191 in 48 households. The following census in 2011 counted 165 people in 46 households. The 2016 census measured the population of the village as 173 people in 50 households.
