= Khatunabad, Qazvin =

Village in Qazvin province, Iran

Khatunabad Persian: خاتون آباد
- Village
- Location within Iran
- Coordinates: 35°50′18″N 50°08′38″E
- Country: Iran
- Province: Qazvin
- County: Buin Zahra
- District: Central
- Rural District: Zahray-ye Bala

Population (2016)
  - Total: 629
- Time zone: UTC+3:30 (IRST)

Khatunabad (Persian: خاتون آباد) (Note: Also romanized as Khātūnābād; formerly known as Khanabad (خان آباد)) is a village in Zahray-ye Bala Rural District of the Central District in Buin Zahra County, Qazvin province, Iran.

== Demographics ==
=== Population ===
At the time of the 2006 National Census, the village's population was 751 in 186 households. The following census in 2011 counted 726 people in 203 households. The 2016 census measured the population of the village as 629 people in 183 households.
