= Rostamabad, Qazvin =

Village in Qazvin province, Iran

Rostamabad Persian: رستم اباد
- Village
- Location within Iran
- Coordinates: 35°40′10″N 49°51′28″E
- Country: Iran
- Province: Qazvin
- County: Buin Zahra
- District: Central
- Rural District: Sagezabad

Population (2016)
  - Total: 520
- Time zone: UTC+3:30 (IRST)

Rostamabad (Persian: رستم اباد) (Note: Also romanized as Rostamābād; also known as Rostamābād-e Ālākīk and Rūstamābād) is a village in Sagezabad Rural District of the Central District in Buin Zahra County, Qazvin province, Iran.

== Demographics ==
=== Population ===
At the time of the 2006 National Census, the village's population was 546 in 169 households. The following census in 2011 counted 479 people in 160 households. The 2016 census measured the population of the village as 520 people in 181 households.
