= Yerjan =

Village in Qazvin province, Iran

Yerjan Persian: يريجان
- Village
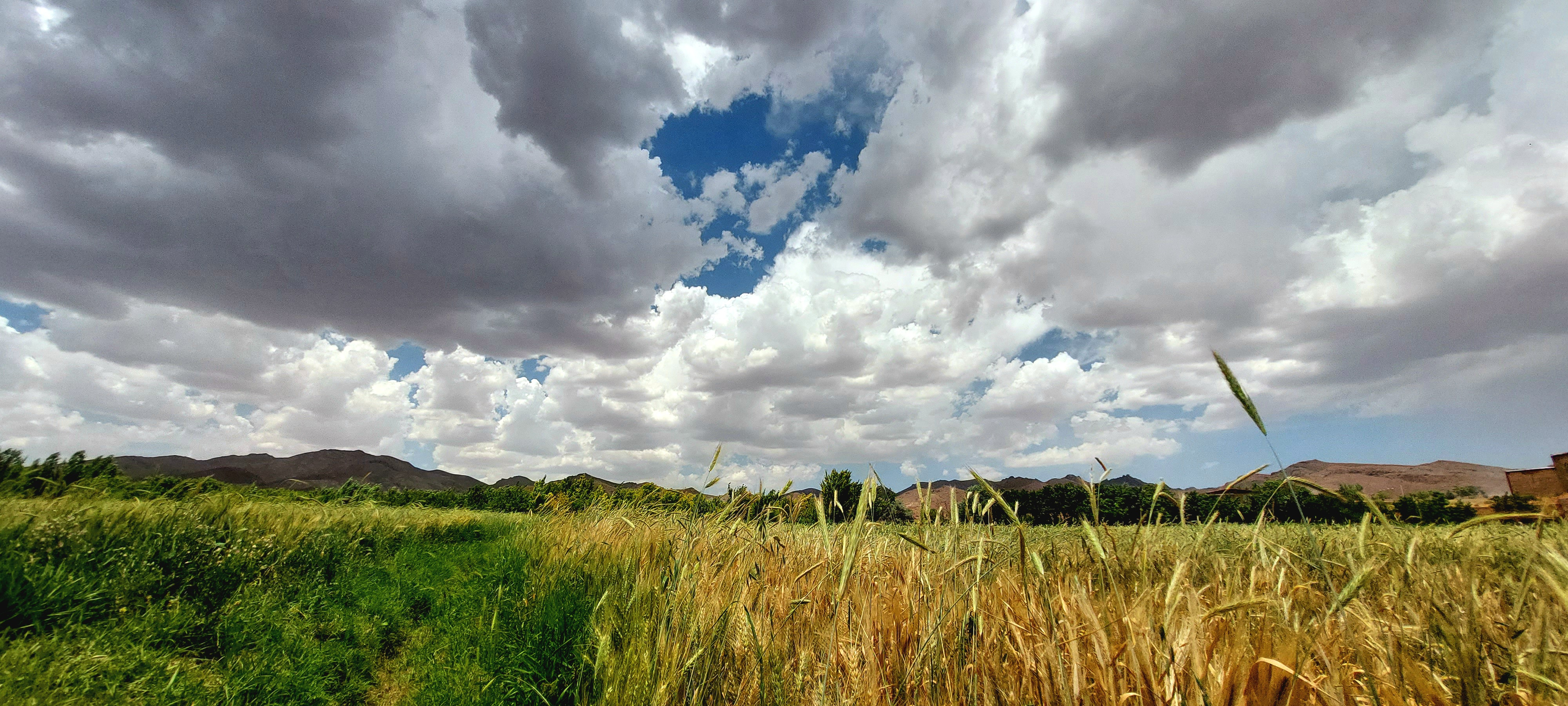
- Summer landscape near the village of Yerjan

- Location within Iran
- Coordinates: 35°39′49″N 49°50′59″E
- Country: Iran
- Province: Qazvin
- County: Buin Zahra
- District: Central
- Rural District: Sagezabad

Population (2016)
  - Total: 472
- Time zone: UTC+3:30 (IRST)

Yerjan (Persian: يريجان) (Note: Also romanized as Yerjān) is a village in Sagezabad Rural District of the Central District in Buin Zahra County, Qazvin province, Iran.

== Demographics ==
=== Population ===
At the time of the 2006 National Census, the village's population was 599 in 145 households. The following census in 2011 counted 514 people in 158 households. The 2016 census measured the population of the village as 472 people in 159 households.
