= Yazan, Qazvin =

Village in Qazvin province, Iran

Yazan Persian: يزن
- Village
- Location within Iran
- Coordinates: 35°44′22″N 49°43′30″E
- Country: Iran
- Province: Qazvin
- County: Buin Zahra
- District: Ramand
- Rural District: Ramand-e Jonubi

Population (2016)
  - Total: 175
- Time zone: UTC+3:30 (IRST)

Yazan (Persian: يزن) is a village in Ramand-e Jonubi Rural District of Ramand District in Buin Zahra County, Qazvin province, Iran.

== Demographics ==
=== Population ===
At the time of the 2006 National Census, the village's population was 221 in 56 households. The following census in 2011 counted 176 people in 50 households. The 2016 census measured the population of the village as 175 people in 66 households.
