= Fathabad, Qazvin =

Village in Qazvin province, Iran

Fathabad Persian: فتح اباد
- Village
- Location within Iran
- Coordinates: 35°45′13″N 50°13′20″E
- Country: Iran
- Province: Qazvin
- County: Buin Zahra
- District: Central
- Rural District: Zahray-ye Pain

Population (2016)
  - Total: 875
- Time zone: UTC+3:30 (IRST)

Fathabad (Persian: فتح اباد) (Note: Also romanized as Fatḩābād) is a village in Zahray-ye Pain Rural District of the Central District in Buin Zahra County, Qazvin province, Iran.

== Demographics ==
=== Population ===
At the time of the 2006 National Census, the village's population was 976 in 220 households. The following census in 2011 counted 923 people in 231 households. The 2016 census measured the population of the village as 875 people in 238 households.
