= Hajji Arab =

Village in Qazvin province, Iran

Hajji Arab Persian: حاجي عرب
- Village
- Location within Iran
- Coordinates: 35°35′36″N 49°44′47″E
- Country: Iran
- Province: Qazvin
- County: Buin Zahra
- District: Central
- Rural District: Sagezabad

Population (2016)
  - Total: 454
- Time zone: UTC+3:30 (IRST)

Hajji Arab (Persian: حاجي عرب) (Note: Also romanized as Ḩājī ‘Arab and Hājji ‘Arab) is a village in Sagezabad Rural District of the Central District in Buin Zahra County, Qazvin province, Iran.

== Demographics ==
=== Population ===
At the time of the 2006 National Census, the village's population was 550 in 116 households. The following census in 2011 counted 457 people in 143 households. The 2016 census measured the population of the village as 454 people in 169 households.
