= Hoseynabad-e Shanazar =

Village in Qazvin province, Iran

Hoseynabad-e Shanazar Persian: حسین‌آباد شانظر
- Village
- Location within Iran
- Coordinates: 35°58′17″N 49°49′15″E
- Country: Iran
- Province: Qazvin
- County: Buin Zahra
- District: Shal
- Rural District: Zeynabad

Population (2016)
  - Total: 305
- Time zone: UTC+3:30 (IRST)

Hoseynabad-e Shanazar (Persian: حسین‌آباد شانظر) (Note: Formerly known as Hoseynabad-e Shah Nazar (حسين ابادشاه نظر), also romanized as Ḩoseynābād-e Shāh Naz̧ar; also known as Ḩoseynābād) is a village in Zeynabad Rural District of Shal District (Note: Formerly known as Dashtabi District) in Buin Zahra County, Qazvin province, Iran.

== Demographics ==
=== Population ===
At the time of the 2006 National Census, the village's population was 286 in 53 households. The following census in 2011 counted 367 people in 104 households. The 2016 census measured the population of the village as 305 people in 90 households.
