= Qeshlaq-e Charkhlu =

Village in Qazvin province, Iran

Qeshlaq-e Charkhlu Persian: قشلاق چرخلو
- Village
- Location within Iran
- Coordinates: 35°48′00″N 49°48′05″E
- Country: Iran
- Province: Qazvin
- County: Buin Zahra
- District: Ramand
- Rural District: Ebrahimabad

Population (2016)
  - Total: 1,360
- Time zone: UTC+3:30 (IRST)

Qeshlaq-e Charkhlu (Persian: قشلاق چرخلو) (Note: Also romanized as Qeshlāq-e Charkhlū; also known as Qeshlāq, Qeshlāq-e Jerkhlū, and Qishlāq) is a village in Ebrahimabad Rural District of Ramand District in Buin Zahra County, Qazvin province, Iran.

== Demographics ==
=== Population ===
At the time of the 2006 National Census, the village's population was 1,180 in 271 households. The following census in 2011 counted 1,286 people in 364 households. The 2016 census measured the population of the village as 1,360 people in 390 households. It was the most populous village in its rural district.
