= Amirabad-e Now =

Village in Qazvin province, Iran

Amirabad-e Now Persian: اميرابادنو
- Village
- Location within Iran
- Coordinates: 35°44′06″N 49°59′31″E
- Country: Iran
- Province: Qazvin
- County: Buin Zahra
- District: Central
- Rural District: Sagezabad

Population (2016)
  - Total: 1,766
- Time zone: UTC+3:30 (IRST)

Amirabad-e Now (Persian: اميرابادنو) (Note: Also romanized as Amīrābād Now and Amīrābād-e Now; also known as Amīnābād-e Now, Amīrābād, and Amīrābād-e Kohneh) is a village in Sagezabad Rural District of the Central District in Buin Zahra County, Qazvin province, Iran.

== Demographics ==
=== Population ===
At the time of the 2006 National Census, the village's population was 1,285 in 348 households. The following census in 2011 counted 1,472 people in 433 households. The 2016 census measured the population of the village as 1,766 people in 550 households. It was the most populous village in its rural district.
