= Mahmudabad, Shal =

Village in Qazvin province, Iran

Mahmudabad Persian: محموداباد
- Village
- Location within Iran
- Coordinates: 35°58′26″N 49°54′10″E
- Country: Iran
- Province: Qazvin
- County: Buin Zahra
- District: Shal
- Rural District: Zeynabad

Population (2016)
  - Total: 0
- Time zone: UTC+3:30 (IRST)

Mahmudabad (Persian: محموداباد) (Note: Also romanized as Maḩmūdābād; also known as Maḩmūdābād-e Kharrūd) is a village in Zeynabad Rural District of Shal District (Note: Formerly known as Dashtabi District) in Buin Zahra County, Qazvin province, Iran.

== Demographics ==
=== Population ===
At the time of the 2006 National Census, the village's population was 40 in 11 households. The village did not appear in the following census of 2011. The 2016 census measured the population of the village as zero.
