= Jahanabad, Zahray-ye Pain =

Village in Qazvin province, Iran

Jahanabad Persian: جهان اباد
- Village
- Location within Iran
- Coordinates: 35°46′26″N 50°07′25″E
- Country: Iran
- Province: Qazvin
- County: Buin Zahra
- District: Central
- Rural District: Zahray-ye Pain

Population (2016)
  - Total: 1,032
- Time zone: UTC+3:30 (IRST)

Jahanabad (Persian: جهان اباد) (Note: Also romanized as Jahānābād) is a village in Zahray-ye Pain Rural District of the Central District in Buin Zahra County, Qazvin province, Iran.

== Demographics ==
=== Population ===
At the time of the 2006 National Census, the village's population was 844 in 209 households. The following census in 2011 counted 932 people in 275 households. The 2016 census measured the population of the village as 1,032 people in 311 households.
