= Ebrahimabad, Buin Zahra =

Village in Qazvin province, Iran

Ebrahimabad Persian: ابراهيم اباد
- Village
- Location within Iran
- Coordinates: 35°49′13″N 49°52′15″E
- Country: Iran
- Province: Qazvin
- County: Buin Zahra
- District: Ramand
- Rural District: Ebrahimabad

Population (2016)
  - Total: 938
- Time zone: UTC+3:30 (IRST)

Ebrahimabad (Persian: ابراهيم اباد) (Note: Also romanized as Ebrāhīmābād and Ībrāhīmābād; Tati: (Persian: برموه), romanized as Bermoe or Bermowa) is a village in, and the capital of, Ebrahimabad Rural District in Ramand District of Buin Zahra County, Qazvin province, Iran.

== Demographics ==
=== Language ===
The primary language of the people is Tati language.

=== Population ===
At the time of the 2006 National Census, the village's population was 806 in 236 households. The following census in 2011 counted 956 people in 273 households. The 2016 census measured the population of the village as 938 people in 300 households.

== Notable people ==
Dr. Fariborz Raisdana who was an Iranian economist, socialist, activist, professor, and a member of the Iranian Writers Association was born and buried in Ebrahimabad.

Manouchehr Ganji, a human rights activist and a former Minister of Education of Iran was born in Ebrahimabad.
