= Amirabad-e Kohneh =

Village in Qazvin province, Iran

Amirabad-e Kohneh Persian: اميرابادكهنه
- Village
- Location within Iran
- Coordinates: 35°52′08″N 50°02′57″E
- Country: Iran
- Province: Qazvin
- County: Buin Zahra
- District: Central
- Rural District: Zahray-ye Bala

Population (2016)
  - Total: 651
- Time zone: UTC+3:30 (IRST)

Amirabad-e Kohneh (Persian: اميرابادكهنه) (Note: Also romanized as Amīrābād-e Kohneh; also known as Amīrābād) is a village in Zahray-ye Bala Rural District of the Central District in Buin Zahra County, Qazvin province, Iran.

== Demographics ==
=== Population ===
At the time of the 2006 National Census, the village's population was 633 in 168 households. The following census in 2011 counted 729 people in 216 households. The 2016 census measured the population of the village as 651 people in 211 households.
