= Ruvand =

Ruvand روواند
- Village
- Location within Iran
- Coordinates: 35°38′24″N 49°47′57″E
- Country: Iran
- Province: Qazvin
- County: Buin Zahra
- Bakhsh: Central
- Rural District: Sagezabad

Population (2006)
  - Total: 80
- Time zone: UTC+3:30 (IRST)
  - Summer (DST): UTC+4:30 (IRDT)

Ruvand (Persian: روواند, also Romanized as Rūvānd; also known as Rūvān) is a village in Sagezabad Rural District, in the Central District of Buin Zahra County, Qazvin Province, Iran. At the 2006 census, its population was 80, in 17 families.
