= Tofak =

Village in Qazvin province, Iran

Tofak Persian: تفك
- Village
- Location within Iran
- Coordinates: 35°42′35″N 49°58′34″E
- Country: Iran
- Province: Qazvin
- County: Buin Zahra
- District: Central
- Rural District: Sagezabad

Population (2016)
  - Total: 589
- Time zone: UTC+3:30 (IRST)

Tofak (Persian: تفك) (Note: Also known as Dafāj) is a village in Sagezabad Rural District of the Central District in Buin Zahra County, Qazvin province, Iran.

== Demographics ==
=== Population ===
At the time of the 2006 National Census, the village's population was 615 in 165 households. The following census in 2011 counted 583 people in 183 households. The 2016 census measured the population of the village as 589 people in 189 households.
