= Papoli-ye Vosta =

Papoli-ye Vosta پاپلي وسطي
- Village
- Location within Iran
- Coordinates: 35°57′55″N 50°05′20″E
- Country: Iran
- Province: Qazvin
- County: Buin Zahra
- Bakhsh: Central
- Rural District: Zahray-ye Bala

Population (2006)
  - Total: 134
- Time zone: UTC+3:30 (IRST)
  - Summer (DST): UTC+4:30 (IRDT)

Papoli-ye Vosta (Persian: پاپلي وسطي, also Romanized as Pāpolī-ye Vosţá, Pā Polī-ye Vasaţī, and Pāypol-e Vostá; also known as Pāplu, Pāpolī, Papoli Soflá, Pāpolī-ye Mīānī, and Pāpūlī) is a village in Zahray-ye Bala Rural District, in the Central District of Buin Zahra County, Qazvin Province, Iran. At the 2006 census, its population was 134, in 38 families.
