= Kakin =

Kakin ككين
- Village
- Location within Iran
- Coordinates: 35°59′24″N 49°58′00″E
- Country: Iran
- Province: Qazvin
- County: Buin Zahra
- Bakhsh: Central
- Rural District: Zahray-ye Bala

Population (2006)
  - Total: 47
- Time zone: UTC+3:30 (IRST)
  - Summer (DST): UTC+4:30 (IRDT)

Kakin (Persian: ككين, also Romanized as Kakīn, Kagīn, and Kahkīn) is a village in Zahray-ye Bala Rural District, in the Central District of Buin Zahra County, Qazvin Province, Iran. At the 2006 census, its population was 47, in 13 families.
