= Khuznin =

Village in Qazvin province, Iran

Khuznin Persian: خوزنين
- Village
- Location within Iran
- Coordinates: 35°51′40″N 49°45′24″E
- Country: Iran
- Province: Qazvin
- County: Buin Zahra
- District: Ramand
- Rural District: Ramand-e Jonubi

Population (2016)
  - Total: 3,194
- Time zone: UTC+3:30 (IRST)

Khuznin (Persian: خوزنين) (Note: Also romanized as Khūznīn) is a village in, and the capital of, Ramand-e Jonubi Rural District in Ramand District of Buin Zahra County, Qazvin province, Iran. The previous administrative center for the rural district was the city of Danesfahan.

== Demographics ==
=== Population ===
At the time of the 2006 National Census, the village's population was 2,865 in 667 households. The following census in 2011 counted 2,779 people in 757 households. The 2016 census measured the population of the village as 3,194 people in 977 households. It was the most populous village in its rural district.
