= Valiabad, Zahray-ye Bala =

Village in Qazvin province, Iran

Valiabad Persian: ولي اباد
- Village
- Location within Iran
- Coordinates: 35°48′20″N 50°02′32″E
- Country: Iran
- Province: Qazvin
- County: Buin Zahra
- District: Central
- Rural District: Zahray-ye Bala

Population (2016)
  - Total: 913
- Time zone: UTC+3:30 (IRST)

Valiabad (Persian: ولي اباد) (Note: Also romanized as Valīābād; also known as Walīābāb) is a village in Zahray-ye Bala Rural District of the Central District in Buin Zahra County, Qazvin province, Iran.

== Demographics ==
=== Population ===
At the time of the 2006 National Census, the village's population was 904 in 234 households. The following census in 2011 counted 861 people in 266 households. The 2016 census measured the population of the village as 913 people in 287 households.
