= Mohammadabad-e Khareh =

Village in Qazvin province, Iran

Mohammadabad-e Khareh Persian: محمدابادخره
- Village
- Location within Iran
- Coordinates: 36°01′18″N 50°04′18″E
- Country: Iran
- Province: Qazvin
- County: Buin Zahra
- District: Central
- Rural District: Zahray-ye Bala

Population (2016)
  - Total: 919
- Time zone: UTC+3:30 (IRST)

Mohammadabad-e Khareh (Persian: محمدابادخره) (Note: Also romanized as Moḩammadābād-e Khareh; also known as Moḩammadābād-e Kharūd) is a village in Zahray-ye Bala Rural District of the Central District in Buin Zahra County, Qazvin province, Iran.

== Demographics ==
=== Population ===
At the time of the 2006 National Census, the village's population was 896 in 217 households. The following census in 2011 counted 880 people in 232 households. The 2016 census measured the population of the village as 919 people in 283 households.
