= Mandarabad =

Village in Qazvin province, Iran

Mandarabad Persian: مندراباد
- Village
- Location within Iran
- Coordinates: 35°59′16″N 49°51′03″E
- Country: Iran
- Province: Qazvin
- County: Buin Zahra
- District: Shal
- Rural District: Zeynabad

Population (2016)
  - Total: 485
- Time zone: UTC+3:30 (IRST)

Mandarabad (Persian: مندراباد) (Note: Also romanized as Mandarābād and Mender Abad; formerly known as Mohammadabad (محمّدآباد), also romanized as Moḩammadābād) is a village in Zeynabad Rural District of Shal District (Note: Formerly known as Dashtabi District) in Buin Zahra County, Qazvin province, Iran.

== Demographics ==
=== Population ===
At the time of the 2006 National Census, the village's population was 485 in 121 households. The following census in 2011 counted 574 people in 172 households. The 2016 census measured the population of the village as 485 people in 149 households.
