= Sowminak =

Village in Qazvin province, Iran

Sowminak Persian: سومينك
- Village
- Location within Iran
- Coordinates: 35°38′54″N 49°38′55″E
- Country: Iran
- Province: Qazvin
- County: Buin Zahra
- District: Ramand
- Rural District: Ramand-e Jonubi

Population (2016)
  - Total: 151
- Time zone: UTC+3:30 (IRST)

Sowminak (Persian: سومينك) (Note: Also romanized as Someynak and Sowmīnak; also known as Samīnak, Samaink, Simank, Smainak, and Sormīnak) is a village in Ramand-e Jonubi Rural District of Ramand District in Buin Zahra County, Qazvin province, Iran.

== Demographics ==
=== Population ===
At the time of the 2006 National Census, the village's population was 211 in 46 households. The following census in 2011 counted 177 people in 49 households. The 2016 census measured the population of the village as 151 people in 50 households.
