= Kheyrabad, Buin Zahra =

Village in Qazvin province, Iran

Kheyrabad Persian: خيراباد
- Village
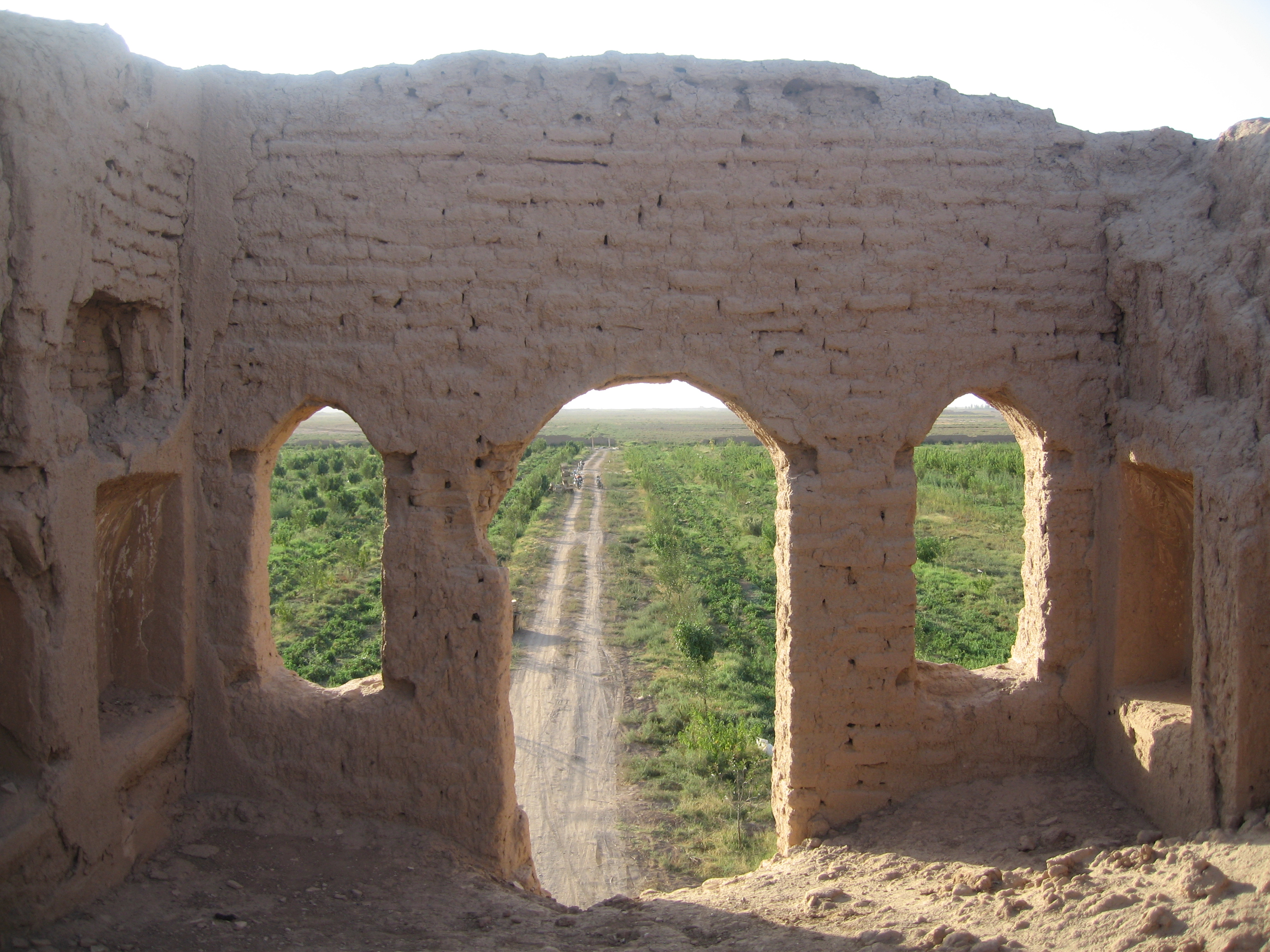
- Ruins near Kheyrabad

- Location within Iran
- Country: Iran
- Province: Qazvin
- County: Buin Zahra
- District: Shal
- Rural District: Zeynabad

Population (2016)
  - Total: 379
- Time zone: UTC+3:30 (IRST)

Kheyrabad (Persian: خيراباد) (Note: Also romanized as Kheyrābād; also known as Khāirābād) is a village in Zeynabad Rural District of Shal District (Note: Formerly known as Dashtabi District) in Buin Zahra County, Qazvin province, Iran.

== Demographics ==
=== Population ===
At the time of the 2006 National Census, the village's population was 327 in 64 households. The following census in 2011 counted 415 people in 112 households. The 2016 census measured the population of the village as 379 people in 105 households.
