= Aqcheh Mazar =

Village in Qazvin province, Iran

Aqcheh Mazar Persian: اقچه مزار
- Village
- Location within Iran
- Coordinates: 35°40′36″N 50°12′48″E
- Country: Iran
- Province: Qazvin
- County: Buin Zahra
- District: Central
- Rural District: Zahray-ye Pain

Population (2016)
  - Total: 429
- Time zone: UTC+3:30 (IRST)

Aqcheh Mazar (Persian: اقچه مزار) (Note: Also romanized as Āqcheh Mazār; also known as Āghcheh Mazār, Āghjeh Mazār, and Aqa Mazār) is a village in Zahray-ye Pain Rural District of the Central District in Buin Zahra County, Qazvin province, Iran.

== Demographics ==
=== Population ===
At the time of the 2006 National Census, the village's population was 436 in 113 households. The following census in 2011 counted 301 people in 85 households. The 2016 census measured the population of the village as 429 people in 135 households.
