= Papoli-ye Olya =

Papoli-ye Olya پاپلي عليا
- Village
- Location within Iran
- Coordinates: 35°58′09″N 50°01′35″E
- Country: Iran
- Province: Qazvin
- County: Buin Zahra
- Bakhsh: Central
- Rural District: Zahray-ye Bala

Population (2006)
  - Total: 30
- Time zone: UTC+3:30 (IRST)
  - Summer (DST): UTC+4:30 (IRDT)

Papoli-ye Olya (Persian: پاپلي عليا, also Romanized as Pāpolī-ye ‘Olyā; also known as Pāpolī-ye Bālā) is a village in Zahray-ye Bala Rural District, in the Central District of Buin Zahra County, Qazvin Province, Iran. At the 2006 census, its population was 30, in 8 families.
