= Qaleh Abdol Robababad =

Village in Qazvin province, Iran

Qaleh Abdol Robababad Persian: قلعه عبدالرباب اباد
- Village
- Country: Iran
- Province: Qazvin
- County: Buin Zahra
- District: Shal
- Rural District: Zeynabad

Population (2016)
  - Total: 40
- Time zone: UTC+3:30 (IRST)

Qaleh Abdol Robababad (Persian: قلعه عبدالرباب اباد) (Note: Also romanized as Qal‘eh ʿAbdol Robābābād) is a village in Zeynabad Rural District of Shal District (Note: Formerly known as Dashtabi District) in Buin Zahra County, Qazvin province, Iran.

== Demographics ==
=== Population ===
At the time of the 2006 National Census, the village's population was 58 in 17 households. The village did not appear in the following census of 2011. The 2016 census measured the population of the village as 40 people in 12 households.
