= Rudak, Qazvin =

Village in Qazvin province, Iran

Rudak Persian: رودک
- Village
- Location within Iran
- Coordinates: 35°41′41″N 49°53′39″E
- Country: Iran
- Province: Qazvin
- County: Buin Zahra
- District: Central
- Rural District: Sagezabad

Population (2016)
  - Total: 1,270
- Time zone: UTC+3:30 (IRST)

Rudak (Persian: رودک) (Note: Also Romanized as Rūdak) is a village in Sagezabad Rural District of the Central District in Buin Zahra County, Qazvin province, Iran.

== Demographics ==
=== Population ===
At the time of the 2006 National Census, the village's population was 1,556 in 398 households. The following census in 2011 counted 1,488 people in 415 households. The 2016 census measured the population of the village as 1,270 people in 383 households.
