= Espik =

Village in Qazvin province, Iran

Espik Persian: اسپيك
- Village
- Location within Iran
- Coordinates: 35°46′33″N 49°38′43″E
- Country: Iran
- Province: Qazvin
- County: Buin Zahra
- District: Ramand
- Rural District: Ramand-e Jonubi

Population (2016)
  - Total: 225
- Time zone: UTC+3:30 (IRST)

Espik (Persian: اسپيك) (Note: Also romanized as Espīk and Espīyak; also known as Esbek, Esbīk, Isbīk, and Is-hāq) is a village in Ramand-e Jonubi Rural District of Ramand District in Buin Zahra County, Qazvin province, Iran.

== Demographics ==
=== Population ===
At the time of the 2006 National Census, the village's population was 242 in 51 households. The following census in 2011 counted 187 people in 46 households. The 2016 census measured the population of the village as 225 people in 63 households.
