= Faizabad Castle =

Castle in Qazvin Province, Iran

Faizabad castle
- قلعه فیض‌آباد

General information
- Type: Castle
- Location: Buin Zahra County, Iran

Faizabad castle (Persian: قلعه فیض‌آباد) is a historical castle located in Buin Zahra County in Qazvin Province, Iran. The longevity of this fortress dates back to the Historical periods after Islam.
