= Lawajik Castle =

Castle in Qazvin Province, Iran

Lawajik castle
- قلعه لواجیک

General information
- Type: Castle
- Location: Buin Zahra County, Iran

Lawajik castle (Persian: قلعه لواجیک) is a historical castle located in Buin Zahra County in Qazvin Province, The longevity of this fortress dates back to the Early centuries of historical periods after Islam.
