= Arasanj-e Jadid =

Village in Qazvin province, Iran

Arasanj-e Jadid Persian: اراسنج جديد
- Village
- Location within Iran
- Coordinates: 35°42′44″N 50°04′43″E
- Country: Iran
- Province: Qazvin
- County: Buin Zahra
- District: Central
- Rural District: Zahray-ye Pain

Population (2016)
  - Total: 1,117
- Time zone: UTC+3:30 (IRST)

Arasanj-e Jadid (Persian: آراسنج جديد) (Note: Also romanized as Ārāsanj-e Jadīd; also known as Arasan, Ārāsanj, Ārāsanj-e Bālā, Ārāsanj-e ‘Olyā, and Aresanīj; also known as Araciana) is a village in Zahray-ye Pain Rural District of the Central District in Buin Zahra County, Qazvin province, Iran.

== Demographics ==
=== Population ===
At the time of the 2006 National Census, the village's population was 3,318 in 747 households. The following census in 2011 counted 3,742 people in 1,017 households. The 2016 census measured the population of the village as 1,117 people in 252 households.
