= Arasanj-e Qadim =

Village in Qazvin province, Iran

Arasanj-e Qadim Persian: اراسنج قديم
- Village
- Location within Iran
- Coordinates: 35°41′43″N 50°05′23″E
- Country: Iran
- Province: Qazvin
- County: Buin Zahra
- District: Central
- Rural District: Zahray-ye Pain

Population (2016)
  - Total: 3,740
- Time zone: UTC+3:30 (IRST)

Arasanj-e Qadim (Persian: اراسنج قديم) (Note: Also romanized as Ārāsanj-e Qadīm; also known as Ārāsanj, Ārāsanj-e Pā’īn, and Ārāsanj-e Soflá) is a village in Zahray-ye Pain Rural District of the Central District in Buin Zahra County, Qazvin province, Iran.

== Demographics ==
=== Population ===
At the time of the 2006 National Census, the village's population was 670 in 139 households. The following census in 2011 counted 859 people in 212 households. The 2016 census measured the population of the village as 3,740 people in 1,061 households. It was the most populous village in its rural district.
