= Arasanj =

Arasanj (Persian: آراسنج) may refer to:

- Arasanj-e Jadid
- Arasanj-e Qadim
