= Kolah Darreh =

Village in Qazvin province, Iran

Kolah Darreh Persian: كله دره
- Village
- Location within Iran
- Coordinates: 35°45′28″N 50°10′59″E
- Country: Iran
- Province: Qazvin
- County: Buin Zahra
- District: Central
- Rural District: Zahray-ye Pain

Population (2016)
  - Total: 851
- Time zone: UTC+3:30 (IRST)

Kolah Darreh (Persian: كله دره) (Note: Also romanized as Kaleh Darreh, Kolā Darreh, and Kulah Darreh) is a village in Zahray-ye Pain Rural District of the Central District in Buin Zahra County, Qazvin province, Iran.

== Demographics ==
=== Population ===
At the time of the 2006 National Census, the village's population was 962 in 233 households. The following census in 2011 counted 1,032 people in 267 households. The 2016 census measured the population of the village as 851 people in 248 households.
