= Qari Daqu Castle =

Castle in Qazvin Province, Iran

Qari Daqu castle
- قلعه قری داغو

General information
- Type: Castle
- Location: Buin Zahra County, Iran

Qari Daqu castle (Persian: قلعه قری داغو) is a historical castle located in Buin Zahra County in Qazvin Province, The longevity of this fortress dates back to the Historical periods after Islam.
