= Papoli =

Papoli or Papuli (Persian: پاپلي) may refer to:

- Papoli-ye Olya
- Papoli-ye Vosta
