= Kagin =

Kagin may refer to:

- Edwin Kagin (1940–2014), American lawyer
- Kagin, Iran, a village
