= Danesfahan =

City in Qazvin province, Iran

Danesfahan Persian: دانسفهان
- City
- Location within Iran
- Coordinates: 35°48′42″N 49°44′35″E
- Country: Iran
- Province: Qazvin
- County: Buin Zahra
- District: Ramand

Population (2016)
  - Total: 9,434
- Time zone: UTC+3:30 (IRST)

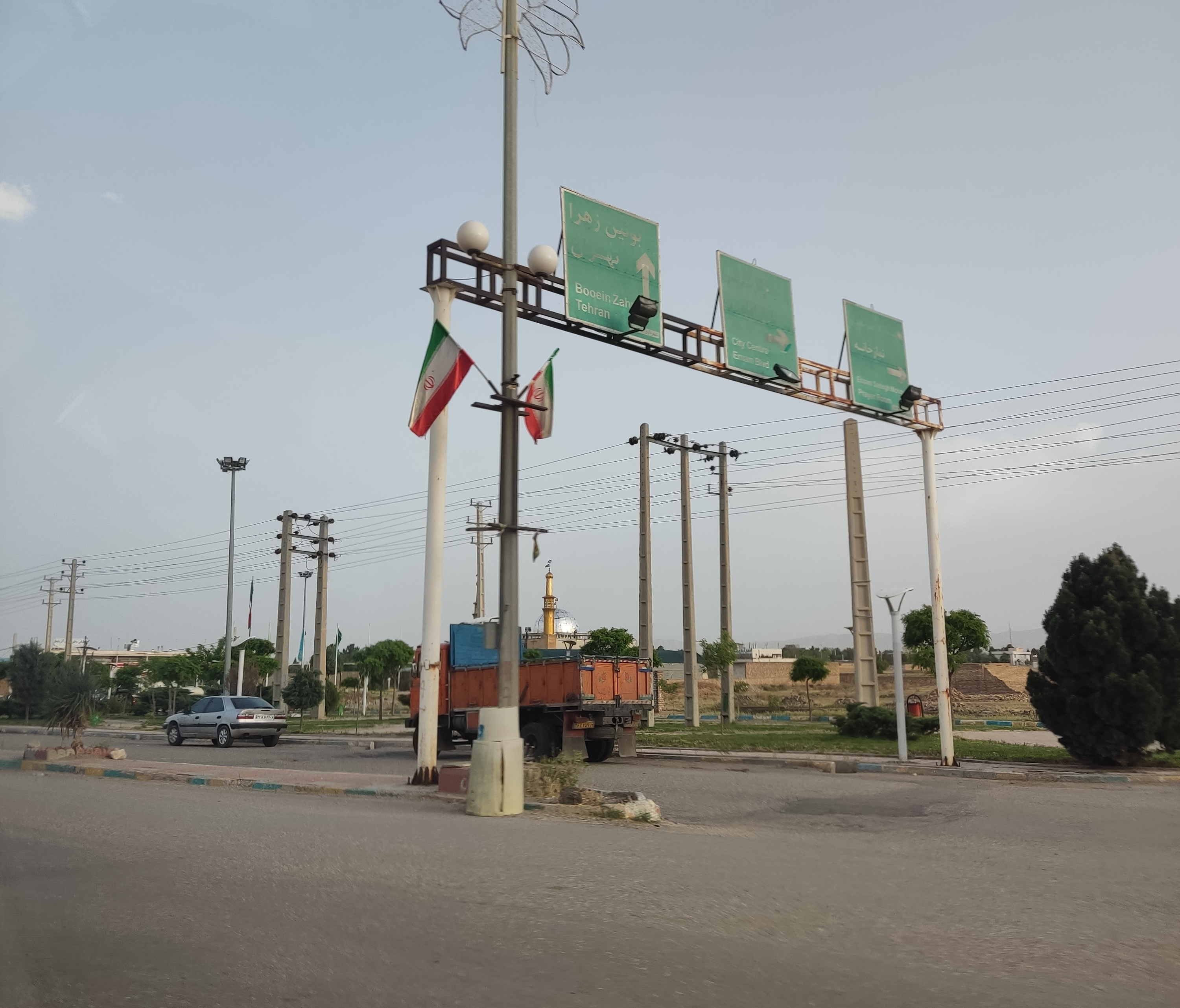

Danesfahan (Persian: دانسفهان) (Note: Also romanized as Dānesfahān; also known as Dānesfān and Danīsfahān) is a city in, and the capital of, Ramand District in Buin Zahra County, Qazvin province, Iran. It was the administrative center for Ramand-e Jonubi Rural District until the capital of the rural district was transferred to the village of Khuznin.

== Demographics ==
=== Population ===
At the time of the 2006 National Census, the city's population was 8,687 in 2,141 households. The following census in 2011 counted 9,545 people in 2,583 households. The 2016 census measured the population of the city as 9,434 people in 2,701 households.

== Overview ==
Danesfahan is several kilometres west of Sagezabad and several kilometres south of Esfarvarin. Historically it has been affected by earthquakes.
