= Ruvan =

Ruvan or Ravan (Persian: روان) may refer to:

- Ravan, Hamadan
- Ravan, Kermanshah
- Ruvan, Qazvin
