= Chalambar =

Chalambar (Persian: چلمبر) may refer to:

- Chalambar, Ardabil
- Chalambar, Qazvin
