= Ebrahimabad Rural District =

Rural district in Qazvin province, Iran

Ebrahimabad Rural District Persian: دهستان ابراهيم آباد
- Rural District
- Location within Iran
- Coordinates: 35°47′N 49°51′E
- Country: Iran
- Province: Qazvin
- County: Buin Zahra
- District: Ramand
- Established: 1997
- Capital: Ebrahimabad

Population (2016)
  - Total: 4,473
- Time zone: UTC+3:30 (IRST)

Ebrahimabad Rural District (Persian: دهستان ابراهيم آباد) is in Ramand District of Buin Zahra County, Qazvin province, Iran. Its capital is the village of Ebrahimabad.

== Demographics ==
=== Population ===
At the time of the 2006 National Census, the rural district's population was 4,028 in 1,081 households. There were 4,209 inhabitants in 1,238 households at the following census of 2011. The 2016 census measured the population of the rural district as 4,473 in 1,399 households. The most populous of its 12 villages was Qeshlaq-e Charkhlu, with 1,360 people.
