= Kola Darreh =

Kola Darreh (Persian: دره كلا) may refer to:

- Kola Darreh, Mazandaran
- Kola Darreh, Qazvin
