= Zeynabad Rural District =

Rural district in Qazvin province, Iran

Zeynabad Rural District Persian: دهستان زين آباد
- Rural District
- Location within Iran
- Coordinates: 35°56′N 49°51′E
- Country: Iran
- Province: Qazvin
- County: Buin Zahra
- District: Shal
- Established: 1997
- Capital: Zeynabad

Population (2016)
  - Total: 4,183
- Time zone: UTC+3:30 (IRST)

Zeynabad Rural District (Persian: دهستان زين آباد) is in Shal District (Note: Formerly known as Dashtabi District) of Buin Zahra County, Qazvin province, Iran. Its capital is the village of Zeynabad.

== Demographics ==
=== Population ===
At the time of the 2006 National Census, the rural district's population was 3,958 in 876 households. There were 4,358 inhabitants in 1,179 households at the following census of 2011. The 2016 census measured the population of the rural district as 4,183 in 1,194 households. The most populous of its 16 villages was Zeynabad, with 1,697 people.

=== Other villages in the rural district ===
- Abdol Robababad
- Hoseynabad-e Shanazar
- Kheyrabad
- Mahmudabad
- Mandarabad
- Qaleh Abdol Robababad
- Sakhsabad
