= Is-haq =

Is-haq may refer to:

- Is-haq, Kerman
- Is-haq, Qazvin
