= Esmatabad, Qazvin =

City in Qazvin province, Iran

Esmatabad Persian: عصمت اباد
- City
- Location within Iran
- Coordinates: 35°50′51″N 50°03′51″E
- Country: Iran
- Province: Qazvin
- County: Buin Zahra
- District: Central
- Established as a city: 2020

Population (2016)
  - Total: 2,986
- Time zone: UTC+3:30 (IRST)

Esmatabad (Persian: عصمت اباد) (Note: Also romanized as ‘Eşmatābād and Īsmatabad) is a city in the Central District of Buin Zahra County, Qazvin province, Iran, serving as the administrative center for Zahray-ye Bala Rural District.

== Demographics ==
=== Ethnicity and Language ===
This city is populated by Azerbaijani Turks.

=== Population ===
At the time of the 2006 National Census, Esmatabad's population was 3,510 in 848 households, when it was a village in Zahray-ye Bala Rural District. The following census in 2011 counted 3,722 people in 1,066 households. The 2016 census measured the population of the village as 2,986 people in 922 households. It was the most populous village in its rural district.

Esmatabad was converted to a city in 2020.
