= Zahray-ye Pain Rural District =

Rural district in Qazvin province, Iran

Zahray-ye Pain Rural District Persian: دهستان زهرائ پائين
- Rural District
- Location within Iran
- Coordinates: 35°39′N 50°05′E
- Country: Iran
- Province: Qazvin
- County: Buin Zahra
- District: Central
- Established: 1987
- Capital: Rahimabad

Population (2016)
  - Total: 9,527
- Time zone: UTC+3:30 (IRST)

Zahray-ye Pain Rural District (Persian: دهستان زهرائ پائين) is in the Central District of Buin Zahra County, Qazvin province, Iran. Its capital is the village of Rahimabad.

== Demographics ==
=== Population ===
At the time of the 2006 National Census, the rural district's population was 8,948 in 2,082 households. There were 9,530 inhabitants in 2,578 households at the following census of 2011. The 2016 census measured the population of the rural district as 9,527 in 2,693 households. The most populous of its 29 villages was Arasanj-e Qadim, with 3,740 people.

=== Other villages in the rural district ===
- Aqcheh Mazar
- Arasanj-e Jadid
- Fathabad
- Jahanabad
- Kolah Darreh
