= Shal, Qazvin =

City in Qazvin province, Iran

Shal Persian: شال
- City
- Location within Iran
- Coordinates: 35°53′57″N 49°46′08″E
- Country: Iran
- Province: Qazvin
- County: Buin Zahra
- District: Shal

Population (2016)
  - Total: 15,290
- Time zone: UTC+3:30 (IRST)

Shal (Persian: شال) is a city in, and the capital of, Shal District (Note: Formerly known as Dashtabi District) in Buin Zahra County, Qazvin province, Iran.

== Demographics ==
=== Population ===
At the time of the 2006 National Census, the city's population wa 15,104 in 3,348 households. The following census in 2011 counted 14,996 people in 3,972 households. The 2016 census measured the population of the city as 15,290 people in 4,217 households.

== Economy ==
Shal is historically known as a center of sheep breeding.

== In literature ==
The 14th-century author Hamdallah Mustawfi listed Shal as one of the main villages in the territory of Qazvin.
