= Fariborz Raisdana =

Iranian economist and activist (1945–2020)

- Born: 19 January 1945; Tehran, Imperial State of Iran
- Died: 16 March 2020 (aged 75); Tehran, Iran
- Education: London School of Economics; National University of Iran
- Occupations: Professor, writer
- Years active: 1959–2020
- Known for: Economist, socialist activist, writer, professor, political prisoner
- Spouse: Azadeh Forghani (divorced)

Fariborz Raisdana (Persian: فریبرز رئیس‌دانا. 19 January 1945 – 16 March 2020) was an Iranian economist, socialist, activist, professor, and a member of the Iranian Writers' Association (Persian: کانون نویسندگان ایران). He was the author of numerous articles and books, including Applied Development Economics; Money and Inflation; Political Economy of Development, and Globalization.

== Early life ==
Raisdana was born in Tehran on 19 January 1945. His father, Haji Khan, was a Lab Doctor in Tehran and was originally from Ebrahimabad (Buin Zahra) and as such Fariborz would spend most of the summers during his early years in Ebrahimabad. He would later attend Molavi Elementary and Hakim Nezami High School in Tehran. Being the child of a "Khan" and his easy and happy upbringing in Tehran and even in his ancestral village of Ebrahimabad as opposed to the widespread poverty and hardship in Imperial Iran was the primary reason he became interested in topics of social injustice.

Raisdana spent his teenage years in a political climate surrounded by the Oil Nationalization Movement and the 28 Mordad coup d'état. He was arrested multiple times for his involvement and membership in the Second National Front.

== Education ==
Raisdana acquired his Bachelor's and Master's in Economics and Econometrics from the Iranian National University. Following his graduation, he spent a few years instructing in a few different universities. He continued his teaching and instruction until his arrest, when he was forced to leave the country. Due to the ideological shifts in the National Front, Raisdana had changed his perception and connections with the movement and had instead become interested in more left-leaning political movements of Iran. His arrest was also due to SAVAK's persecution of Iranian Socialist and Marxists at the time. He would later use a fake passport to travel to Germany, Turkey, Lebanon, Bulgaria, and England.

Raisdana continued his education in London School of Economics where he would graduate with a PhD in Economics.

== Arrests ==
Raisdana was arrested on 21 March 2012 in Tehran after criticizing the Iranian subsidy reform plan in an interview with BBC Persian and given a one-year sentence at Evin Prison, for a series of charges including "membership in the Writer's Association, preparing seditious announcements against the regime, giving interviews to BBC and VOA, and accusing the Islamic Republic of abusing prisoners and holding show trials". Individuals and associations such as the Iranian Writers' Association, The Middle East Economic Association, and The Workers' Rights Defenders spoke out against his arrest.

Raisdana died on 16 March 2020 because of COVID-19 complications in Tehran Pars hospital after spending six days in the hospital. He was buried in his birthplace, Ebrahimabad.

== Political and economic views ==
A left-wing economist opposed to neoliberalism, Raisdana was a consistent critic of both Western imperialism and the Islamic Republic.

=== Opposition to imperialism and war ===
Raisdana regarded American imperialism as inherently aggressive and argued that its harm to Iranian society was not new, saying that "American imperialism has been tormenting this society ever since the 28 Mordad coup against Mosaddegh".

He considered the 2003 American invasion of Iraq a clear example of this aggression. Speaking of George W. Bush, he said that Bush "killed two million people (including 500,000 children) there, on the pretext that they were building an atomic bomb", and that Bush "entered Iraq on a lie, saying they have an atomic bomb ... the very same things they now say about Iran". While describing Saddam Hussein as "a beast ... a bullying dictator" who had attacked Iran, Raisdana condemned the manner of his removal, arguing that toppling Saddam "in that way did not draw on the people's revolution or the people's forces; it was the method that George Bush Jr. ... pursued". He called this pattern "regime change", contending that imperialism incites malcontents until governments are forced into a military response, which the media—"90–95 percent of which worldwide is in the hands of the imperialists"—then recasts as fighting dictatorship.

At the same time, Raisdana argued that imposing war on Iran was no solution and emphasized the Iranian people's capacity to resist major foreign powers, describing people burdened by poverty and inequality as "the best force against the nuclear power of the whole world".

=== "Third line" ===
Raisdana described his own stance in the conflict between the United States and the Islamic Republic as a "third line" (Persian: خط سوم)—independent of both the Western camp and the ruling power. In a 2015 interview with IranWire he said, "We are the third line. We are neither pro-American nor pro-autocracy", adding that he favoured improved relations and that "the Western imperialists and their domestic allies" should not "impose proxy wars on the Iranian people". He also held that opposition to imperialism must not come at the expense of democracy, criticizing part of the left for having "made their great historic blunder—that merely because these [regimes] are anti-imperialist, they sat and watched as democracy burned in the fire of fanaticism and power".

== Bibliography ==
=== Author ===
Title	Year	Publisher	Note
Money and Inflation	1990	Papyrus	
Lesser Socioeconomic Development	1993	Ghatre	
Lessons and Tips: Fourteen articles about Iran and the World	1993	Samar	
A Study on the Social Wellbeing of Iran	2001	National Rehabilitation Administration	
Applied Studies of Development and Economics of Iran	2002	Cheshme	This title was published in 3 separate volumes.
Economics of Political Development	2003	Negah	
Democracy against Injustice	2003	Elm	
Internationalization of Economic Genocide	2005	Negah	
Approaches and Methods in Economics	2005	Agah	
An Introduction to Contemporary Iranian Poetry: In Social and Political Contexts	2007	Digar	
Freedom and Socialism: A Few Discussions and Opinions	2007	Digar	
A Memory of Fantasy	2008	Negah	Poetry Book
An introduction to Literature	2008	Negah	
Explorations of Politics and Society	2016	Gol Azin	
Intellectual Character	2018	Gol Azin	

=== Translation ===
Title	Original Author	Year	Publisher
Urban and Regional Economics	Matthew Edel	2002	Ghatre
Violence Today: Actual Existing Barbarism?	Leo Panitch & Colin Leys	2015	Negah
