= Tepe Ghabristan =

Archaeological site in Qazvin province, Iran

- Tepe Qabrestan
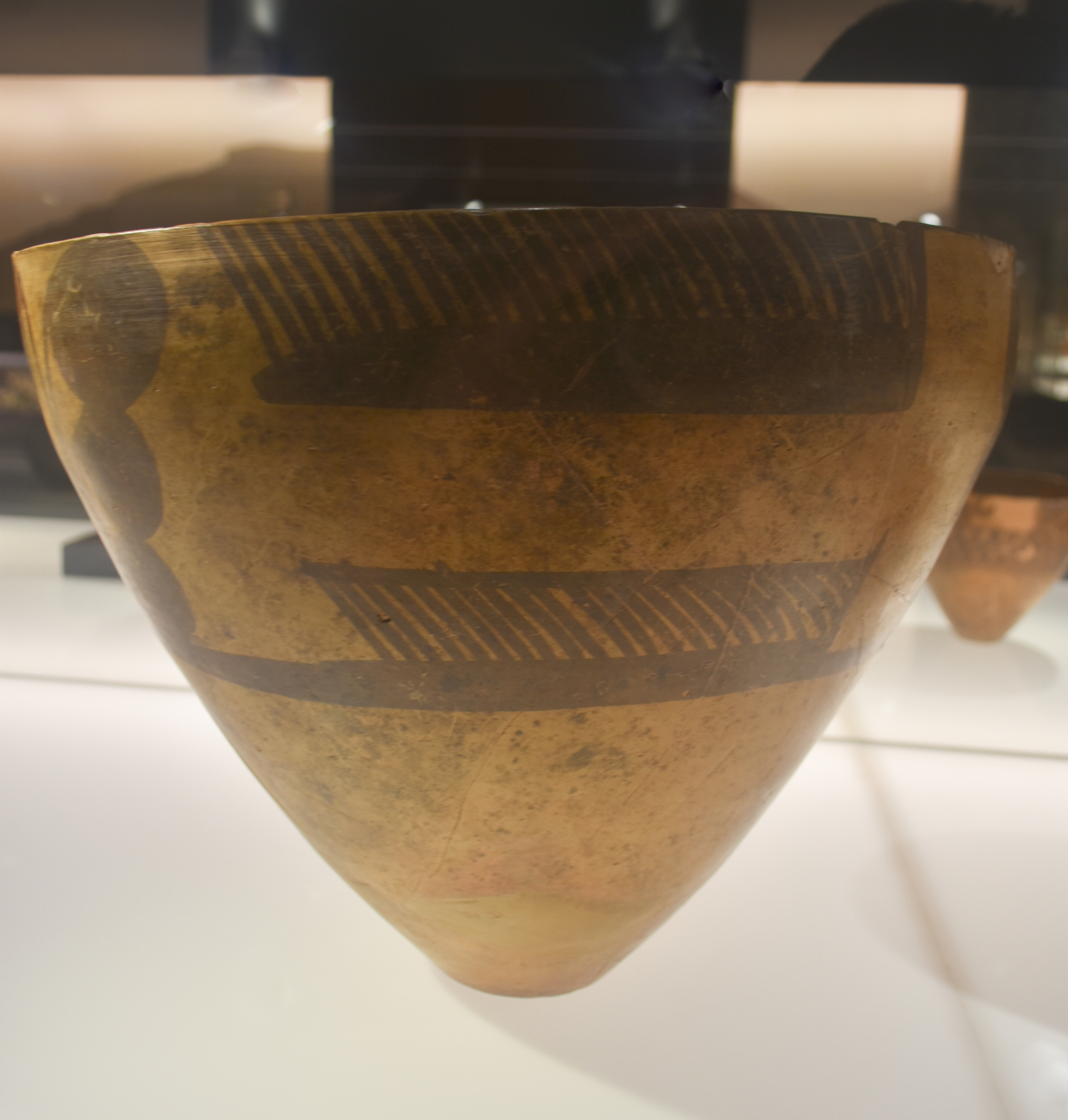
- Bronze Age pottery bowl, ca. 4000–3700 BC, from Tappeh Qabrestan, Qazvin

- Location within Iran
- 35.81640°N 49.94745°E
- Periods: Chalcolithic and Bronze Age
- Location: Qazvin province, Iran

Site notes
- Area: 10 ha (25 acres)
- Excavation dates: 1970–1974, 2002
- Archaeologists: Yousef Majidzadeh, Armin Schmidt, Hassan Fazeli Nashli
- Condition: buried under alluvium

Tepe Ghabristan, also Tepe Ghabrestan or Tepe Qabrestan (Persian: تپه قبرستان), is a late Chalcolithic tell in Qazvin province, northwestern Iran, about 130 kilometers west of modern Tehran. It is a four hectare (possibly reaching 10 hectares at its peak) low-lying site on the Qazvin Plain.

Tepe Ghabristan is important for understanding early metallurgy (copper workshops, crucibles), settlement patterns, and environmental shifts. It was buried under alluvium during its early history. It is a part of the Sagzabad Cluster research project in Iran, involving teams from the University of Tehran and international collaborators. More recent information is found in Maghsoudi (2014).

== Location ==
Sagzabad Cluster of archaeological sites on the Qazvin Plain of Iran includes three major tells that stretch approximately 2.5 km east to west. Tepe Ghabristan is on the western side, and Teppe Zagheh is on the eastern side. In the middle there is the largest tell that is labelled as Sagzabad (or Tepe Sagzabad) by Maghsoudi (2014), who also describes the geological morphology of the area. The same tell is also labelled as Qareh Tape (also known as Ghare Tappeh) by Dehpahlavan (2022), and other scholars.

A 6th and 5th millennium BC settlement of Zagheh (Zaghe) is about 1.5 hectares in size.

The 2nd millennium BC, and Iron Age settlement of Sagzabad (also known as Segzabad) is 14 hectares in size.

The small modern town of Sagezabad is located about 4 km south of Tepe Ghabristan.

== History ==
=== Chalcolithic Age ===
Tepe Ghabristan was occupied in the 4th millennium BC though many Iron Age graves, mostly destroyed by looting, were found at the top level. Geophysical surveys of the site reveal hidden features like irrigation channels and structures, highlighting a slowdown in sediment deposition. Its cultural connections also reveal broader Near Eastern trends, and links with prehistoric Uruk, as demonstrated by pottery.

- Ghabristan I - Early Chalcolithic 4300–4000 BC
- Ghabristan II/III - Middle Chalcolithic 4000–3700 BC
- Ghabristan III/IV - Late Chalcolithic 3700–3000 BC

Metalworking. It was also a very early metalworking hub, as demonstrated by extensive copper workshops with crucibles, molds, furnaces, and large amounts of copper, suggesting significant production. There are no copper mines near the site, so copper had to be imported from the regional trade network from near Qazvin, Arisman, Tepe Godin (Zagros) or Seh Gabi (Central Zagros) areas.

Destruction. The 4th millennium BC settlement was destroyed in a violent conflagration with many sling bullets being found.

=== Pottery ===
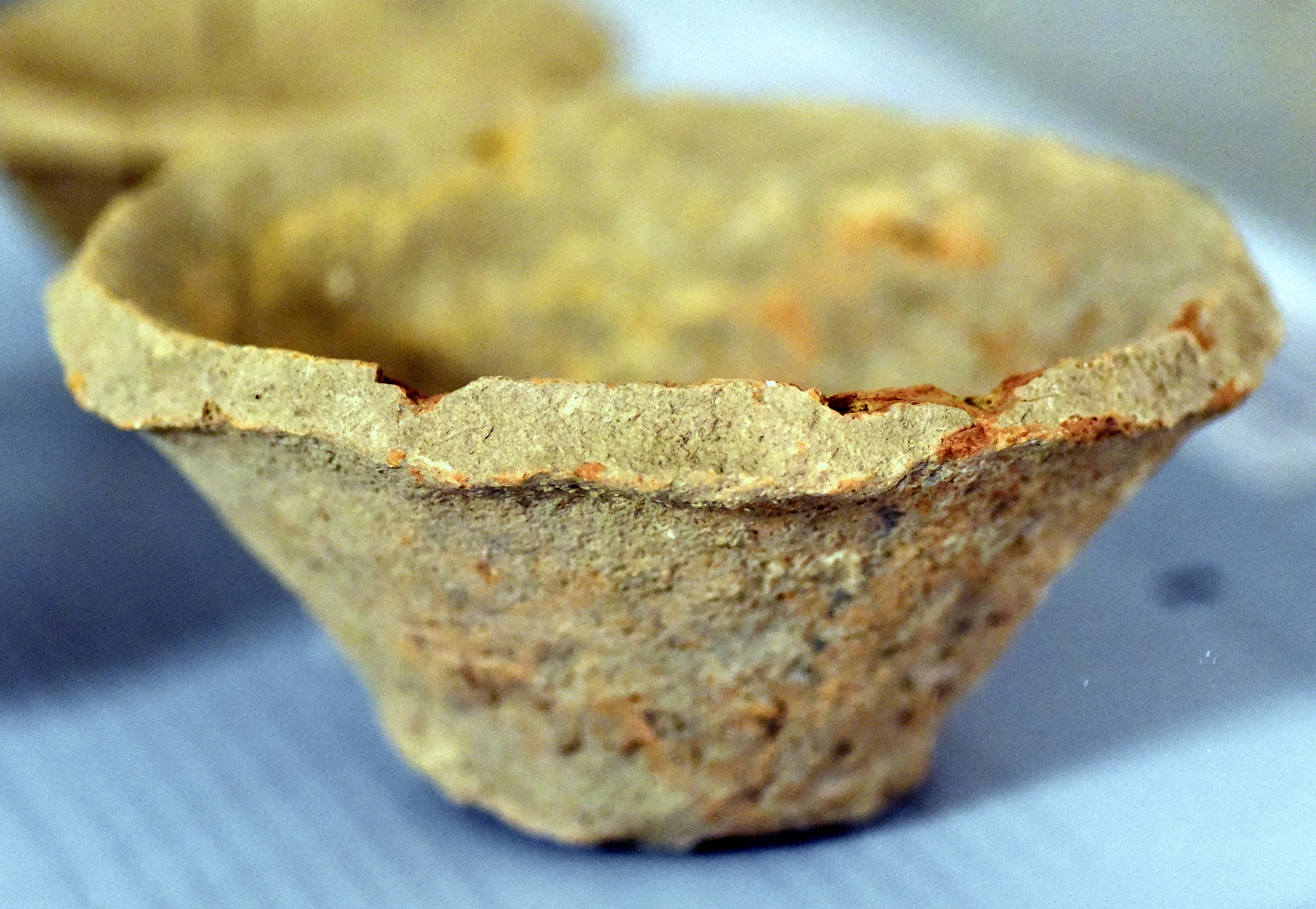
Typical Urukean Beveled Rim Bowl from northern Iraq. Uruk period, 4000–3100 BC, featuring Chaff-Faced appearance. Sulaymaniyah Museum, Iraq

Beveled rim bowls, diagnostic pottery for the Uruk Culture, were found (layer IV.I-3) at the site as well as conical cups.

==== Uruk Grey Ware ====
Tepe Ghabristan and Tepe Sialk, as shown on the map of Uruk expansion during the Late Uruk period, ca 3500–3300 BC.

The appearance of Grey Ware at Tepe Ghabristan and the related site of Tepe Sialk in Isfahan province around 3700 BC is generally interpreted as representing a break in the local cultural sequence. This is a handmade, chaff tempered and Chaff-Faced Ware, that is also reported from many Chalcolithic period sites in Western Iran, upper Mesopotamia, as well as in Syria, Iraq (such as Girdi Qala and Logardan), and the south-east of Turkey.

This type of pottery suggests a widespread, transient cultural phenomenon across western Iran, potentially linked to the Uruk expansion in southwest Asia.

Two kinds of kilns were found, square and horseshoe shape (interpreted as pottery kilns). A large decorated pottery fragment was found which the excavator described as an "oldest pictorial expression". Excavators found a coppersmith workshop with "crucibles, open molds (bar ingots), tuyeres, slag, 20 kilograms of copper ore (malachite), 2 silver buttons from Level 9; at lower Level 10 were found a shaft hole ax, hammers, and picks". It has since been suggested that the tuyeres were actually mould fragments.

The remains of dromedary camel were found at the site.

== Excavations ==
The site was excavated from 1970 until 1974, led by Yousef Majidzadeh. While most of the remains were of subsistence agriculture, metalworking, and pottery production, there was one well built monumental complex at the top of the mound. Its walls were preserved up to a height of one meter, and it was interpreted as a temple or administrative center. The complex covered 170 square meters with ten rooms, one thought to be a courtyard.

Excavations resumed in 2002 and 2003 by a University of Tehran and Iranian Cultural Heritage Organisation team led by Fazeli Nashli. More recently the site periodization has been changed slightly:

== See also ==
- List of cities of the ancient Near East
- Tureng Tepe
- Tepe Sialk
