= Teppe Zagheh =

- تپه زاغه (Persian)
- Tappeh Sang-e Chakhmaq, Sange Chaxmaq, Chakhmagh
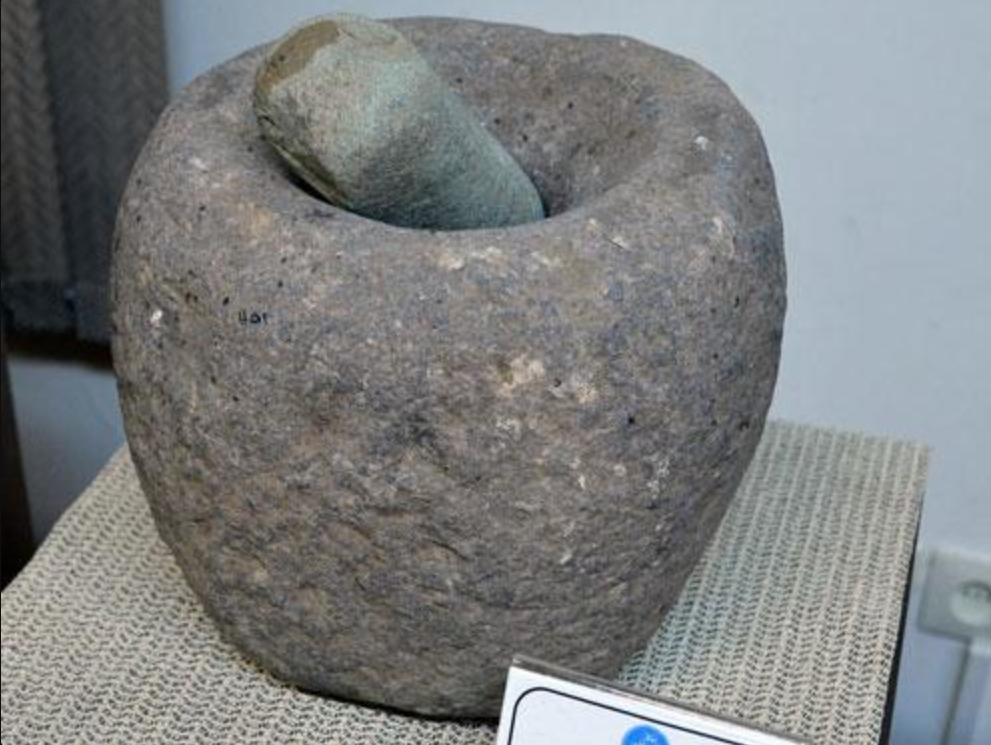
- Tepe Zagheh mortar, c. 7000 BC

- Location within Near East Location within Iran
- 35.823285°N 49.975013°E
- Type: Settlement
- Location: Heydarabad, Qazvin, Iran

History
- Built: c. 5200 BC
- Abandoned: c. 4350 BC

Site notes
- Excavation dates: 2001
- Archaeologists: Ezzat Negahban Seiichi Masuda
- Discovered: before 1979

Teppe Zagheh (Persian: تپه زاغه) was an early urban settlement located in Qazvin, Iran. In Persian, Tappeh means "tell, mound". It was first excavated by a team from the University of Tehran under the direction of Ezzat Negahban in the early 1970s

In the vicinity of Teppe Zagheh are also located the ancient settlements of Tepe Ghabristan, and Tepe Sagzabad.

== Important finds ==
- Discovery of a shrine with interior decoration.

- 23 graves of adults and infants with local and imported goods.

- Administrative artifacts such as tokens.

- Residential dwellings.

It is suggested that the Painted Building was a special place for women to give birth

== Chronology ==
After the re-excavation of Zagheh in 2001, new radiocarbon dates were obtained. The radiocarbon estimations for the settlement of Zagheh was c. 5370–5070 BC and abandoned c. 4460–4240 BC. Thus, it may belong to Transitional Chalcolithic.

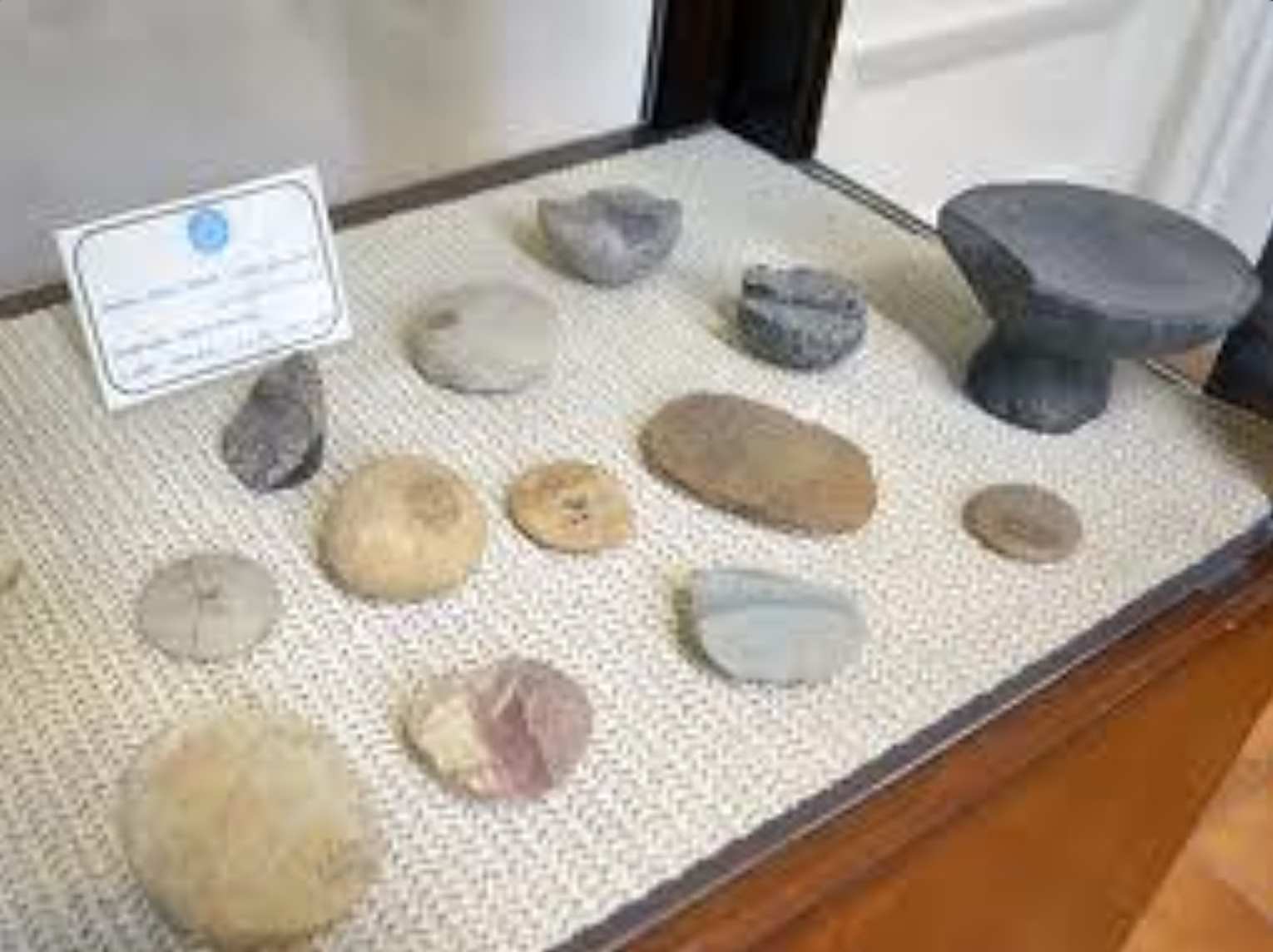
Tepe Zagheh stone tools, c. 7000 BC

There were also many small clay 'tokens', used as counting objects, that were found at Zagheh; these are variously shaped, and are similar to such tokens at other Neolithic sites. These Zagheh tokens are dated typologically to c. 6000 BC. Thus, there were probably two periods of occupation.

Zagheh archaic painted ware (ca. 6000-5500 BC) was found in Tepe Sialk I, sub-levels 1–2. This is the early painted ware, that was first excavated at Teppe Zagheh.

Clay figurines found in Mehrgarh, an important precursor to the Indus Valley civilization, resemble those discovered at Teppe Zagheh, and at Jeitun in Turkmenistan (6th millennium BCE). The faunal remains from the site were studied by Marjan Mashkour who identified Sheep, goats, wild goats, cattle, Gazelles, boars, dogs, and foxes.

== See also ==
- Iranian architecture
