= Tepe Sagzabad =

Archaeological site in Qazvin province, Iran

- Tepe Segzabad, Sagz Abad, Qareh Tepe
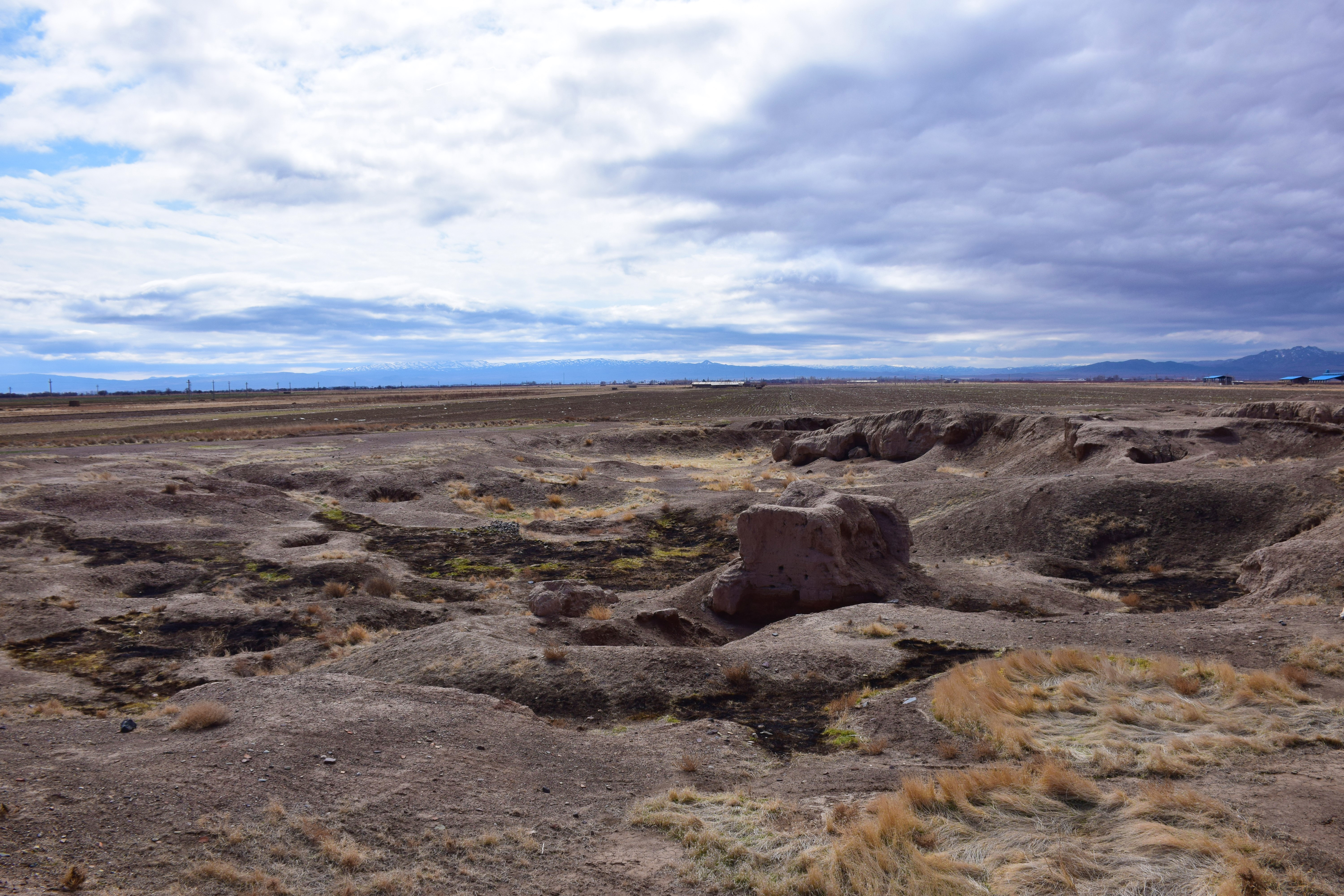
- Archaeological site of Tepe Sagzabad

- Location within Iran
- 35.8163°N 49.9527°E
- Periods: Chalcolithic, Bronze Age, Iron Age
- Location: Qazvin province, Iran

Site notes
- Area: 14 ha (35 acres)
- Excavation dates: 1970–1974, 2016
- Archaeologists: Yousef Majidzadeh

Tepe Sagzabad, also spelled Segzabad, Segazabad, Sagz Abad, Saqz Abad (Persian: تپه سگزآباد), is a significant archaeological mound on the Qazvin Plain of north-central Iran near the modern town of Sagezabad. It is known for its extensive remains from the Chalcolithic, Bronze, Iron, and Achaemenid periods. It is a key part of the Sagzabad archaeological complex, which is a larger cluster of prehistoric sites that also includes Tepe Zagheh and Tepe Ghabristan.

Tepe Sagzabad is also known in archaeological literature as Qareh Tape (also spelled Qara Tepe, Ghareh Tappeh).

Archaeological deposits at the site span approximately 9 meters, indicating thousands of years of settlement. Tepe Sagzabad plays an important role in understanding the Central Iranian plateau’s ancient human settlements, and offers valuable insights into the region’s sociocultural and technological development over this long period.

Tepe Sagzabad is situated in a strategic location serving as a vital crossroads for the movement of people, goods, and ideas between the East and West.

== Exploration ==
Excavations have been conducted at the site since the 1970s by the University of Tehran and international scholars.

The site spans approximately 14 hectares, and it rises about 5 meters above the surrounding plain. In ancient times, it was located near the Hajji'Arab River.

Recent excavations since 2016 have uncovered a major cemetery on the eastern side of the mound dating to the late 2nd millennium and early 1st millennium BC.

Over 40 faience cylinder seals have been discovered; they display both local and Neo-Assyrian styles, and demonstrate the local and regional adaptation of the Assyrian empire influences.

Distinctive pottery vessels have been discovered at Tepe Sagzabad that may have served as distillation vessels; they are dated to the Iron Age III period. Iron Age II and III periods in this area are generally dated to 1100–550 BCE. The vessels feature oval bodies, closed-head form and spouts, and share similarities with ancient distillation apparatuses (alembics). This suggests early experimentation with distillation and complex processing practices.

Iran had a long term cultural tradition of producing rosewater and essential oils by using distillation, and these vessels share some similarities with the traditional vessels used for these purposes.

== Current conditions ==
The site has suffered damage from illegal excavations and looting over the years; this has complicated research efforts. The local municipality has worked to preserve and display some of the significant findings.

== See also ==
- Tureng Tepe
- Tepe Sialk

== Bibliography ==
- Maghsoudi, A. (2012). The Environmental Context of Tepe Sagzabad: Fertility and Resources. Iranian Journal of Archaeological Research, 8, 37-49.
- Majidzadeh, R. (1975). The Kiln Structures of Ancient Iran: Evidence from the Excavation of Tepe Sagzabad. Iranian Journal of Archaeology, 8, 45-57.
- Marjan Mollabeirami 2025, Categorization, Taxonomy, and Analysis of Bony Faunal Remains of Qara Tepe of Sagzabad, Iran. www.persicaantiqua.ir
- Nashli, H. F., Darabi, H., Naseri, R., & Fallahian, Y. (2011). Relative and Absolute Dating of Tepe Sagzabad, Qazvin Plain. Journal of Archaeological Research, 3, 133-158.
- Salehi Nezami, R., Fazeli Nashli, H., & Oudbashi, O. (2020). Chemical Study of Bronze Age and Iron Age Potteries of Sagzabad Tepe. Journal of Archaeological Studies, 12, 147-164.
- Shahmirzadi, S. M. (1977). The Excavation at Sagzabad Mound, Qazvin Plain, Iran, 1970-71. Marlik: Journal of the Institute and Department of Archaeology, Faculty of Humanities, 2, 67-80.
- Shahmirzadi, S. M. (1979). Copper, Bronze, and Their Implementation by Metalsmiths of Sagzabad, Qazvin Plain, Iran. Archäologische Mitteilungen aus Iran Berlin, 12, 49-66.
- Talai, H. (1983). Late Bronze Age and Iron Age I architecture in Sagzabad, Qazvin Plain, the Central Plateau of Iran. Iranica Antiqua, 18, 51-57.
