= Ramand-e Jonubi Rural District =

Rural district in Qazvin province, Iran

Ramand-e Jonubi Rural District Persian: دهستان رامند جنوبي
- Rural District
- Location within Iran
- Coordinates: 35°45′N 49°42′E
- Country: Iran
- Province: Qazvin
- County: Buin Zahra
- District: Ramand
- Established: 1987
- Capital: Khuznin

Population (2016)
  - Total: 5,180
- Time zone: UTC+3:30 (IRST)

Ramand-e Jonubi Rural District (Persian: دهستان رامند جنوبي) is in Ramand District of Buin Zahra County, Qazvin province, Iran. Its capital is the village of Khuznin. The rural district was previously administered from the city of Danesfahan.

== Demographics ==
=== Population ===
At the time of the 2006 National Census, the rural district's population was 5,339 in 1,296 households. There were 4,793 inhabitants in 1,353 households at the following census of 2011. The 2016 census measured the population of the rural district as 5,180 in 1,608 households. The most populous of its 14 villages was Khuznin, with 3,194 people.

=== Other villages in the rural district ===
- Espik
- Khiaraj
- Morad Beyglu
- Sowminak
- Suravjin
- Yazan
