= Sagezabad =

City in Qazvin province, Iran

Sagezabad Persian: سِگزآباد
- City
- Location within Iran
- Coordinates: 35°46′06″N 49°56′21″E
- Country: Iran
- Province: Qazvin
- County: Buin Zahra
- District: Central
- Established as a city: 2005

Population (2016)
  - Total: 5,492
- Time zone: UTC+3:30 (IRST)

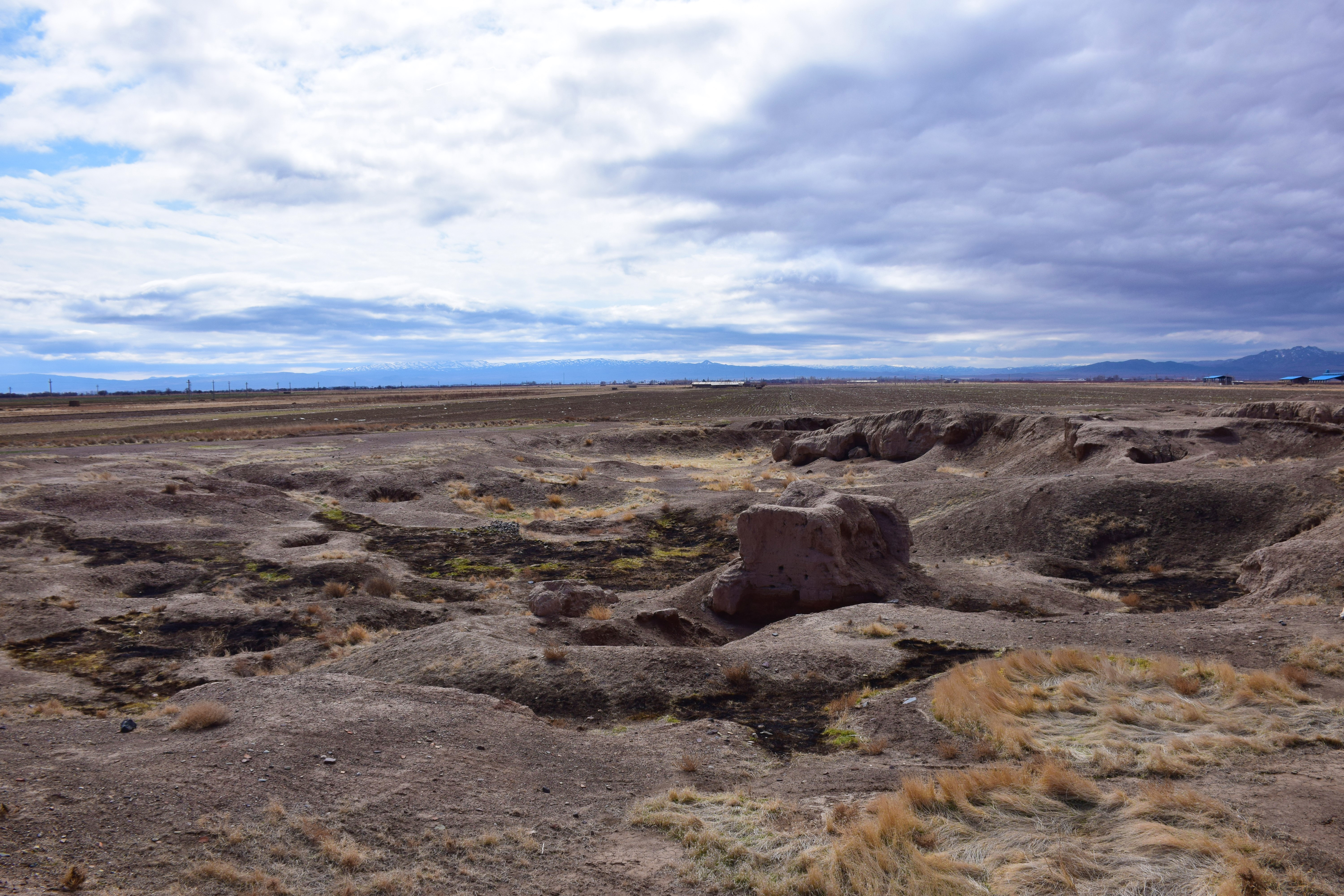
Ancient hills of Segh Abad

Sagezabad (Persian: سِگزآباد) (Note: Also romanized as Sagzabad and Segz Abad; also known as Sezjowa (Tati: سِزجُوا)) is a city in the Central District of Buin Zahra County, Qazvin province, Iran, serving as the administrative center for Sagezabad Rural District. The village of Sagezabad was converted to a city in 2005.

== Demographics ==
=== Language ===
Sagezabad is a Tati-speaking city.

=== Population ===
At the time of the 2006 National Census, the city's population was 4,953 in 1,324 households. The following census in 2011 counted 5,440 people in 1,578 households. The 2016 census measured the population of the city as 5,492 people in 1,664 households.

== In literature ==
The 14th-century author Hamdallah Mustawfi listed Sagezabad as one of the main villages in the territory of Qazvin.

== Archaeology ==
Significant ancient settlements Tepe Sagzabad, Tepe Ghabristan, and Teppe Zagheh are located in the area just north of Sagezabad.
