= Eshratabad, Sabzevar =

Eshratabad عشرت اباد
- Village
- Location within Iran
- Coordinates: 36°18′44″N 57°41′21″E
- Country: Iran
- Province: Razavi Khorasan
- County: Sabzevar
- Bakhsh: Central
- Rural District: Qasabeh-ye Sharqi

Population (2006)
  - Total: 28
- Time zone: UTC+3:30 (IRST)
  - Summer (DST): UTC+4:30 (IRDT)

Eshratabad (Persian: عشرت اباد, also Romanized as ‘Eshratābād) is a village in Qasabeh-ye Sharqi Rural District, in the Central District of Sabzevar County, Razavi Khorasan Province, Iran. At the 2006 census, its population was 28, in 10 families.
