= Eshratabad, Kerman =

Eshratabad عشرت اباد
- Village
- Location within Iran
- Coordinates: 28°34′16″N 57°09′33″E
- Country: Iran
- Province: Kerman
- County: Jiroft
- Bakhsh: Central
- Rural District: Esfandaqeh

Population (2006)
  - Total: 70
- Time zone: UTC+3:30 (IRST)
  - Summer (DST): UTC+4:30 (IRDT)

Eshratabad (Persian: عشرت اباد, also Romanized as ‘Eshratābād) is a village in Esfandaqeh Rural District, in the Central District of Jiroft County, Kerman Province, Iran. At the 2006 census, its population was 70, in 14 families.
