= Sagezabad Rural District =

Rural district in Qazvin province, Iran

Sagezabad Rural District Persian: دهستان سگزآباد
- Rural District
- Location within Iran
- Coordinates: 35°41′N 49°52′E
- Country: Iran
- Province: Qazvin
- County: Buin Zahra
- District: Central
- Established: 1987
- Capital: Sagezabad

Population (2016)
  - Total: 5,635
- Time zone: UTC+3:30 (IRST)

Sagezabad Rural District (Persian: دهستان سگزآباد) is in the Central District of Buin Zahra County, Qazvin province, Iran. It is administered from the city of Sagezabad.

== Demographics ==
=== Population ===
At the time of the 2006 National Census, the rural district's population was 5,672 in 1,461 households. There were 5,482 inhabitants in 1,623 households at the following census of 2011. The 2016 census measured the population of the rural district as 5,635 in 1,804 households. The most populous of its 18 villages was Amirabad-e Now, with 1,766 people.

=== Other villages in the rural district ===
- Hajji Arab
- Rostamabad
- Rudak
- Tofak
- Yerjan
