= Eshratabad, Nishapur =

Eshratabad عشرتاباد
- Village
- Location within Iran
- Coordinates: 36°09′26″N 58°55′33″E
- Country: Iran
- Province: Razavi Khorasan
- County: Nishapur
- Bakhsh: Central
- Rural District: Fazl

Population (2006)
  - Total: 127
- Time zone: UTC+3:30 (IRST)
  - Summer (DST): UTC+4:30 (IRDT)

Eshratabad (Persian: عشرتاباد, also Romanized as ‘Eshratābād) is a village in Fazl Rural District, in the Central District of Nishapur County, Razavi Khorasan Province, Iran. At the 2006 census, its population was 127, in 41 families.
