= Eshratabad, Isfahan =

Eshratabad عشرت اباد
- Village
- Location within Iran
- Coordinates: 32°41′11″N 52°57′19″E
- Country: Iran
- Province: Isfahan
- County: Nain
- Bakhsh: Central
- Rural District: Lay Siyah

Population (2006)
  - Total: 88
- Time zone: UTC+3:30 (IRST)
  - Summer (DST): UTC+4:30 (IRDT)

Eshratabad (Persian: عشرت اباد, also Romanized as ‘Eshratābād) is a village in Lay Siyah Rural District, in the Central District of Nain County, Isfahan Province, Iran. At the 2006 census, its population was 88, in 36 families.
