= Eshratabad, Roshtkhar =

Eshratabad عشرت اباد
- Village
- Location within Iran
- Coordinates: 35°00′34″N 59°41′11″E
- Country: Iran
- Province: Razavi Khorasan
- County: Roshtkhar
- Bakhsh: Central
- Rural District: Roshtkhar

Population (2006)
  - Total: 277
- Time zone: UTC+3:30 (IRST)
  - Summer (DST): UTC+4:30 (IRDT)

Eshratabad (Persian: عشرت اباد, also Romanized as ‘Eshratābād; also known as Hashtābād) is a village in Roshtkhar Rural District, in the Central District of Roshtkhar County, Razavi Khorasan Province, Iran.

== 2006 population ==
At the 2006 census, its population was 277, in 69 families.
