= Zahray-ye Bala Rural District =

Rural district in Qazvin province, Iran

Zahray-ye Bala Rural District Persian: دهستان زهرائ بالا
- Rural District
- Location within Iran
- Coordinates: 35°54′N 50°07′E
- Country: Iran
- Province: Qazvin
- County: Buin Zahra
- District: Central
- Established: 1987
- Capital: Esmatabad

Population (2016)
  - Total: 14,023
- Time zone: UTC+3:30 (IRST)

Zahray-ye Bala Rural District (Persian: دهستان زهرائ بالا) is in the Central District of Buin Zahra County, Qazvin province, Iran. It is administered from the city of Esmatabad.

At the time of the 2006 National Census, the rural district's population was 14,228 in 3,599 households. There were 15,225 inhabitants in 4,367 households at the following census of 2011. The 2016 census measured the population of the rural district as 14,023 in 4,320 households. The most populous of its 41 villages was Esmatabad (now a city), with 2,986 people.

== Other villages in the rural district ==
- Amirabad-e Kohneh
- Hoseynabad
- Khatunabad
- Khunan
- Mohammadabad-e Khareh
- Sadrabad
- Valadabad
- Valiabad
