= Shal District =

District in Qazvin province, Iran

Shal District Persian: بخش شال
- District
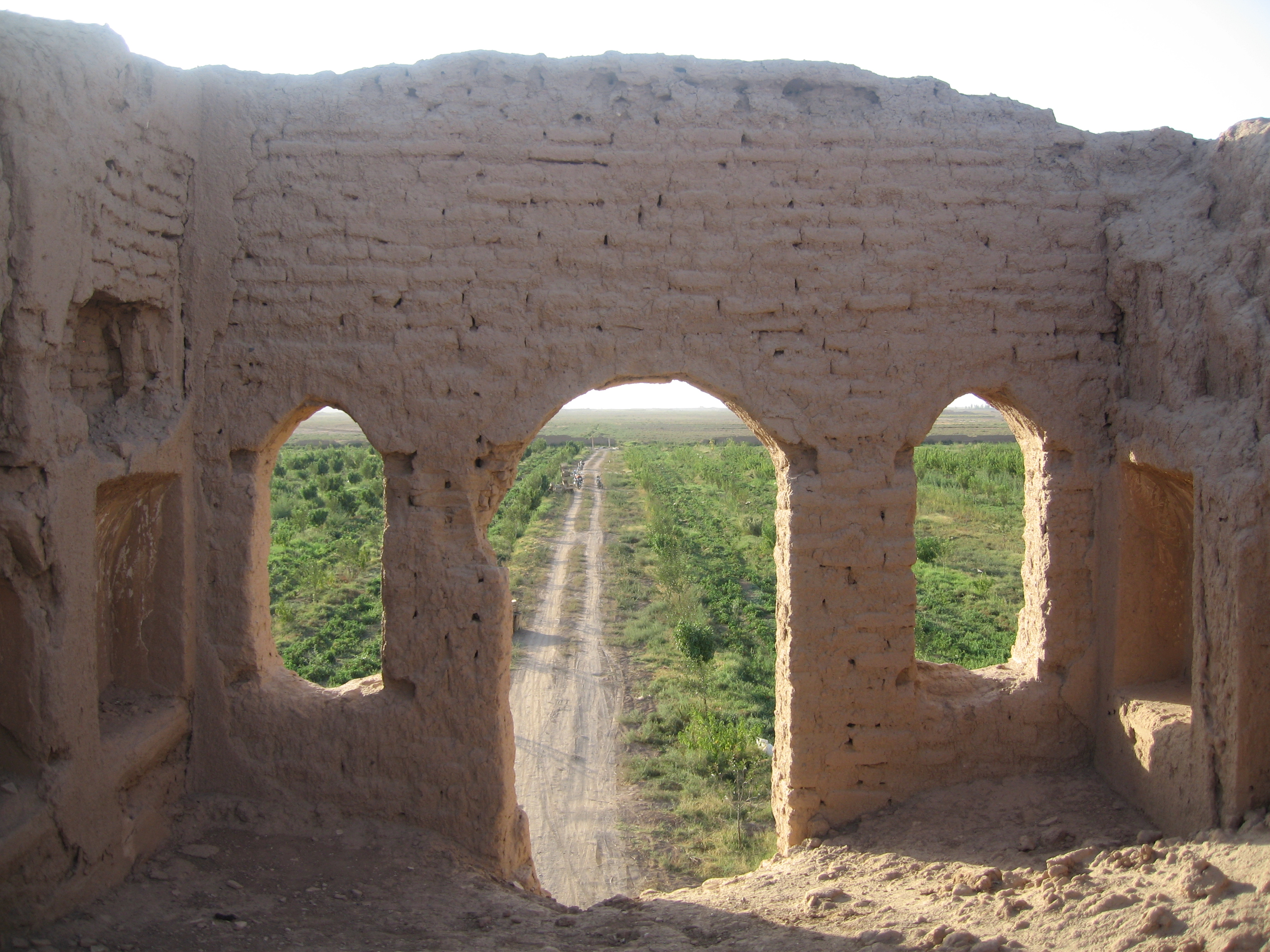
- Ruins near Kheyrabad, Shal

- Location within Iran
- Coordinates: 35°56′N 49°52′E
- Country: Iran
- Province: Qazvin
- County: Buin Zahra
- Established: 1997
- Capital: Shal

Population (2016)
  - Total: 23,238
- Time zone: UTC+3:30 (IRST)

Shal District (Persian: بخش شال) (Note: Formerly known as Dashtabi District (بخش دشتابی)) is in Buin Zahra County, Qazvin province, Iran. Its capital is the city of Shal.

== Demographics ==
=== Population ===
At the time of the 2006 National Census, the district's population was 23,935 in 5,527 households. The following census in 2011 counted 23,572 people in 6,373 households. The 2016 census measured the population of the district as 23,238 inhabitants in 6,609 households.

=== Administrative divisions ===
Shal District Population
Administrative Divisions	2006	2011	2016
Qaleh Hashem RD	4,873	4,218	3,765
Zeynabad RD	3,958	4,358	4,183
Shal (city)	15,104	14,996	15,290
Total	23,935	23,572	23,238
RD = Rural District
