= Ramand District =

District in Qazvin province, Iran

Ramand District Persian: بخش رامند
- District
- Location within Iran
- Coordinates: 35°45′N 49°47′E
- Country: Iran
- Province: Qazvin
- County: Buin Zahra
- Established: 1997
- Capital: Danesfahan

Population (2016)
  - Total: 19,087
- Time zone: UTC+3:30 (IRST)

Ramand District (Persian: بخش رامند) is in Buin Zahra County, Qazvin Province, Iran. The district capital is the city of Danesfahan.

== Demographics ==
=== Population ===
At the time of the 2006 National Census, the district's population was 18,054 in 4,518 households. The 2011 census recorded 18,547 people in 5,174 households. The 2016 census reported 19,087 inhabitants in 5,708 households.

=== Administrative divisions ===
Ramand District Population
Administrative Divisions	2006	2011	2016
Ebrahimabad RD	4,028	4,209	4,473
Ramand-e Jonubi RD	5,339	4,793	5,180
Danesfahan (city)	8,687	9,545	9,434
Total	18,054	18,547	19,087
RD = Rural District
