= Central District (Buin Zahra County) =

District in Qazvin province, Iran

Central District (Buin Zahra County) Persian: بخش مرکزی شهرستان بوئین‌زهرا
- District
- Location within Iran
- Coordinates: 35°47′N 49°59′E
- Country: Iran
- Province: Qazvin
- County: Buin Zahra
- Established: 1996
- Capital: Buin Zahra

Population (2016)
  - Total: 55,500
- Time zone: UTC+3:30 (IRST)

The Central District of Buin Zahra County (Persian: بخش مرکزی شهرستان بوئین‌زهرا) is in Qazvin province, Iran. Its capital is the city of Buin Zahra.

== History ==
The village of Esmatabad was converted to a city in 2020.

== Demographics ==
=== Population ===
At the time of the 2006 National Census, the district's population was 49,649 in 12,716 households. The following census in 2011 counted 53,887 people in 15,394 households. The 2016 census measured the population of the district as 55,500 inhabitants in 16,779 households.

=== Administrative divisions ===
Central District (Buin Zahra County) Population
Administrative Divisions	2006	2011	2016
Sagezabad RD	5,672	5,482	5,635
Zahray-ye Bala RD	14,228	15,225	14,023
Zahray-ye Pain RD	8,948	9,530	9,527
Buin Zahra (city)	15,848	18,210	20,823
Esmatabad (city) (Note: Became a city after the 2016 census)			
Sagezabad (city)	4,953	5,440	5,492
Total	49,649	53,887	55,500
RD = Rural District
