= Buin Zahra County =

County in Qazvin province, Iran

Buin Zahra County Persian: شهرستان بوئین‌زهرا
- County
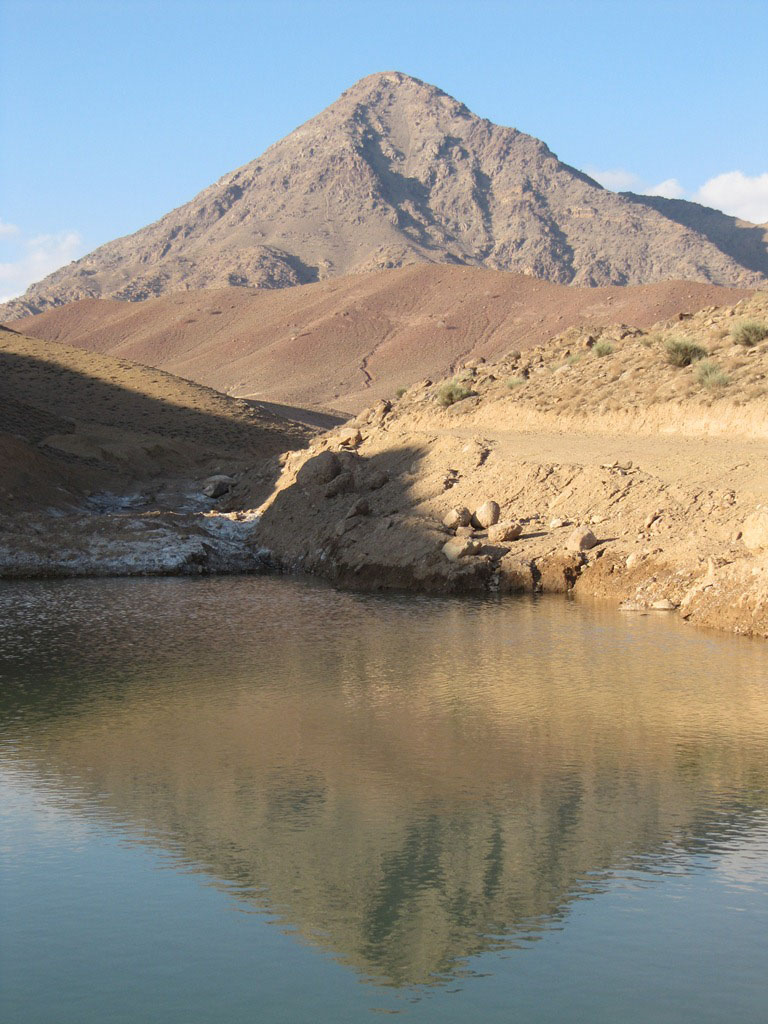
- Bazar Peak near Kheyrabad

- Location of Buin Zahra County in Qazvin province (pink)

- Location of Qazvin province in Iran
- Coordinates: 35°51′N 49°59′E
- Country: Iran
- Province: Qazvin
- Established: 1996
- Capital: Buin Zahra
- Districts: Central, Dashtabi, Ramand, Shal

Population (2016)
  - Total: 122,994
- Time zone: UTC+3:30 (IRST)

Buin Zahra County (Persian: شهرستان بوئین‌زهرا) is in Qazvin province, Iran. Its capital is the city of Buin Zahra.

== History ==
In 2012, Abgarm and Avaj Districts were separated from the county in the establishment of Avaj County. The village of Esmatabad was converted to a city in 2020.

== Demographics ==
=== Language ===
The majority of the population of this county is Azerbaijani Turks, but a minority of Tat people with a population of about 30,000 also live in the cities of Shal, Danesfahan and Sagezabad.

=== Population ===
At the time of the 2006 National Census, the county's population was 153,873 in 38,377 households. The following census in 2011 counted 164,723 people in 47,029 households. The 2016 census measured the population of the county as 122,994 in 36,814 households.

=== Administrative divisions ===
Buin Zahra County's population history and administrative structure over three consecutive censuses are shown in the following table.

Buin Zahra County Population
Administrative Divisions	2006	2011	2016
Central District	49,649	53,887	55,500
Sagezabad RD	5,672	5,482	5,635
Zahray-ye Bala RD	14,228	15,225	14,023
Zahray-ye Pain RD	8,948	9,530	9,527
Buin Zahra (city)	15,848	18,210	20,823
Esmatabad (city) (Note: Became a city after the 2016 census)			
Sagezabad (city)	4,953	5,440	5,492
Abgarm District (Note: Transferred to Avaj County)	15,823	16,936	
Abgarm RD	5,154	4,873	
Kharaqan-e Sharqi RD	5,478	6,065	
Abgarm (city)	5,191	5,998	
Avaj District	22,273	26,611	
Hesar-e Valiyeasr RD	9,050	10,212	
Kharaqan-e Gharbi RD	2,081	3,076	
Shahidabad RD	7,447	7,714	
Avaj (city)	3,695	5,609	
Dashtabi District	24,139	25,170	25,169
Dashtabi-ye Gharbi RD	9,753	10,447	9,916
Dashtabi-ye Sharqi RD	9,554	9,600	10,210
Ardaq (city)	4,832	5,123	5,043
Ramand District	18,054	18,547	19,087
Ebrahimabad RD	4,028	4,209	4,473
Ramand-e Jonubi RD	5,339	4,793	5,180
Danesfahan (city)	8,687	9,545	9,434
Shal District (Note: Formerly Dashtabi District)	23,935	23,572	23,238
Qaleh Hashem RD	4,873	4,218	3,765
Zeynabad RD	3,958	4,358	4,183
Shal (city)	15,104	14,996	15,290
Total	153,873	164,723	122,994
RD = Rural District

== Overview ==
Buin Zahra is famous for pistachios and boasts many pistachio gardens. The main thoroughfare in the capital, Buin Zahra, is Vali-ye Asr Street.

Azad University of Buin Zahra is also located in this city, about ten minutes from the city center.

One of the tourist attraction of the area is "Mehregan Town," north of Buin Zahra, 14 minutes from Buin Zahra Square.

== Earthquakes ==
The area was devastated by the 1962 Bou'in-Zahra earthquake and again by the 2002 Bou'in-Zahra earthquake.

== In popular culture ==
Jalal Al-e-Ahmad's monograph: "Tat people of Block-e-Zahra" provides detailed description of the region.

== See also ==
Media related to Buin Zahra County at Wikimedia Commons
