= Qazvin province =

Province of Iran

Qazvin Province استان قزوین (Persian)
- Province
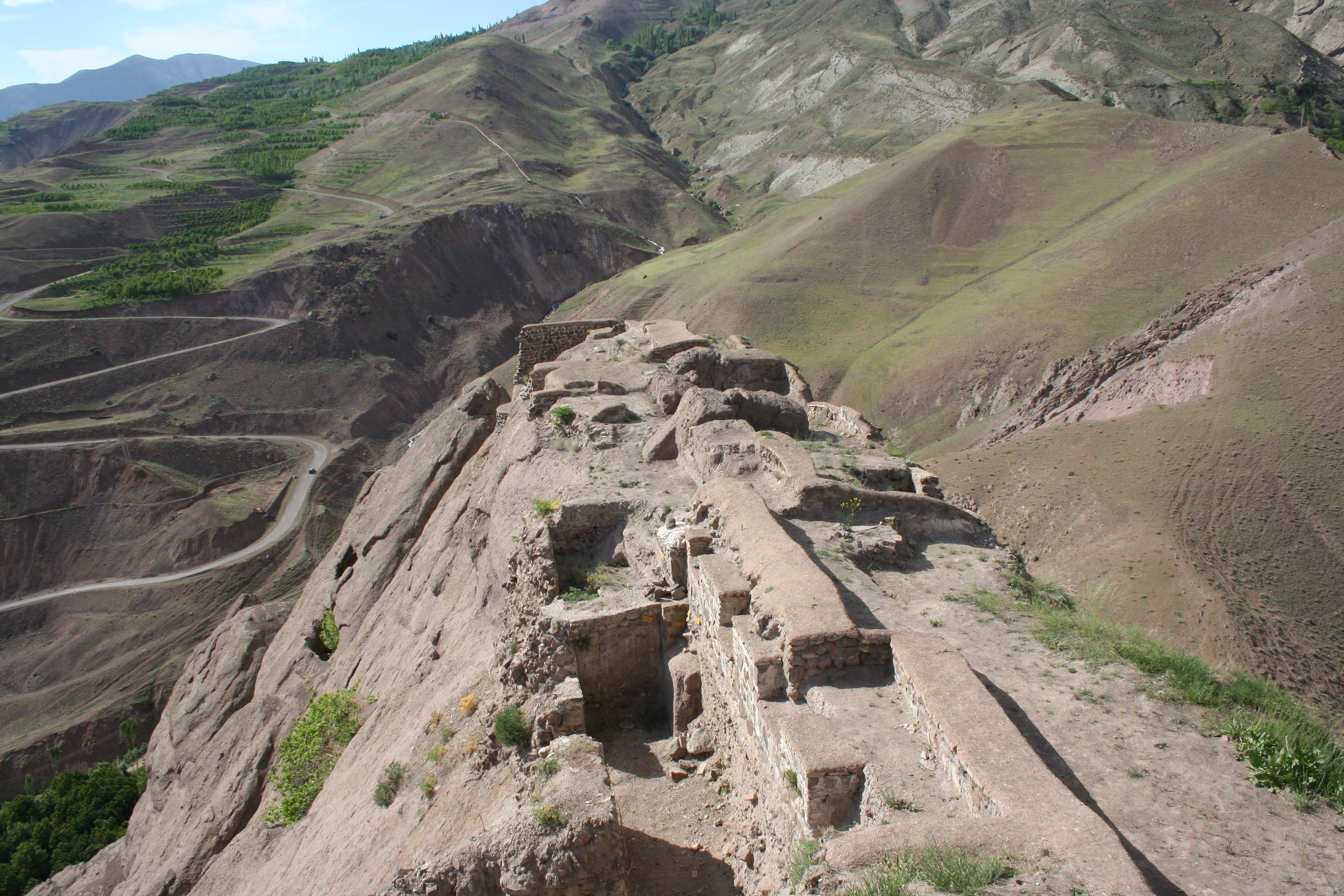
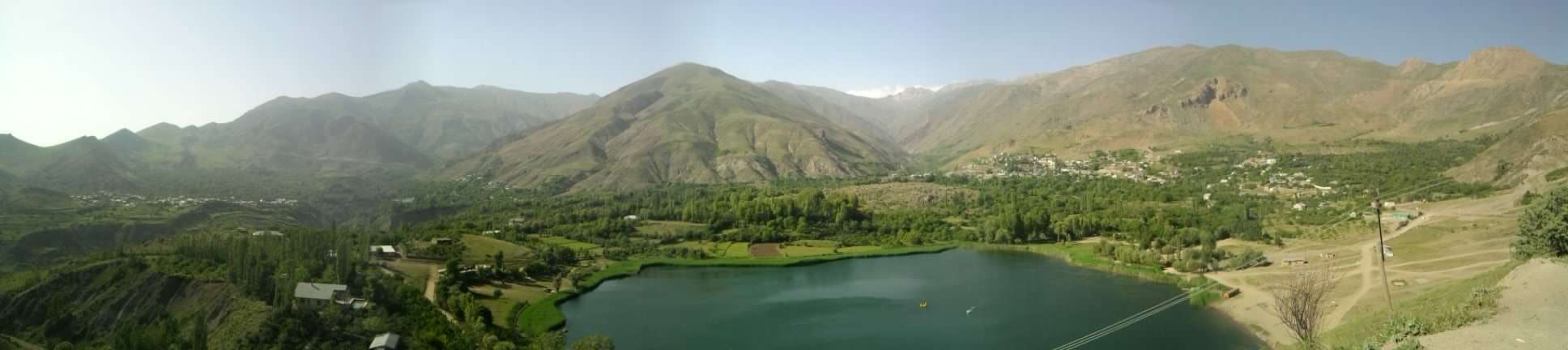
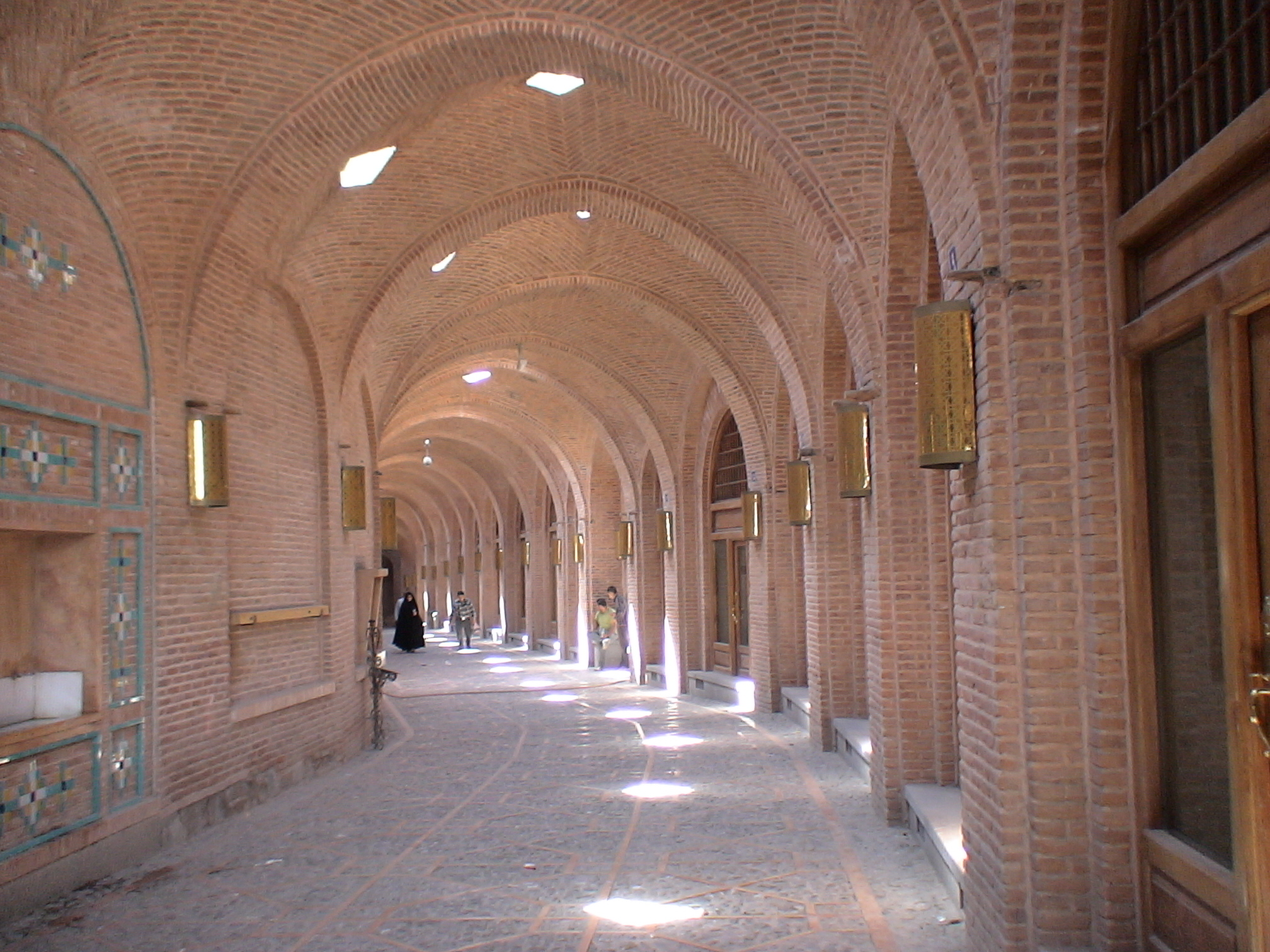
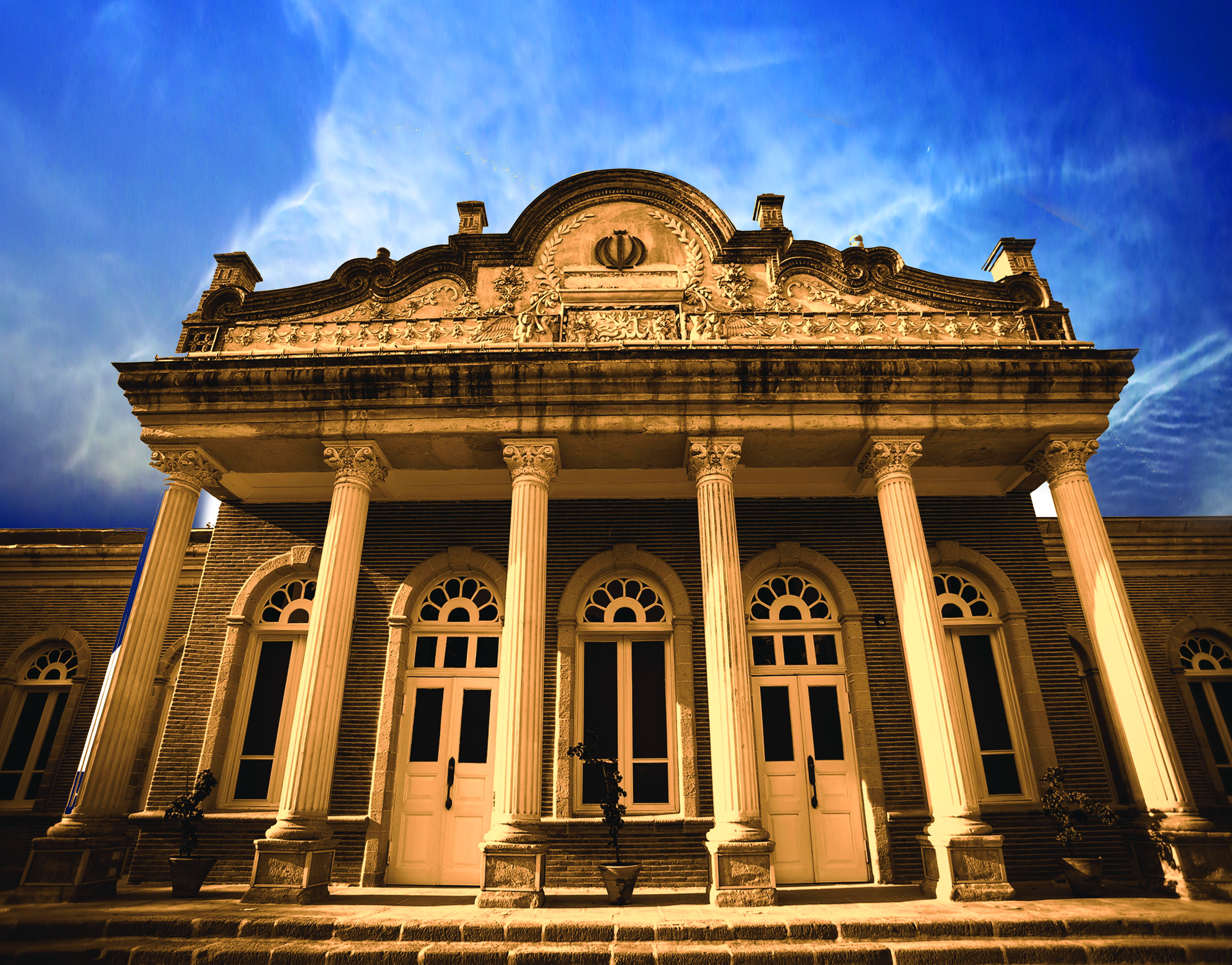
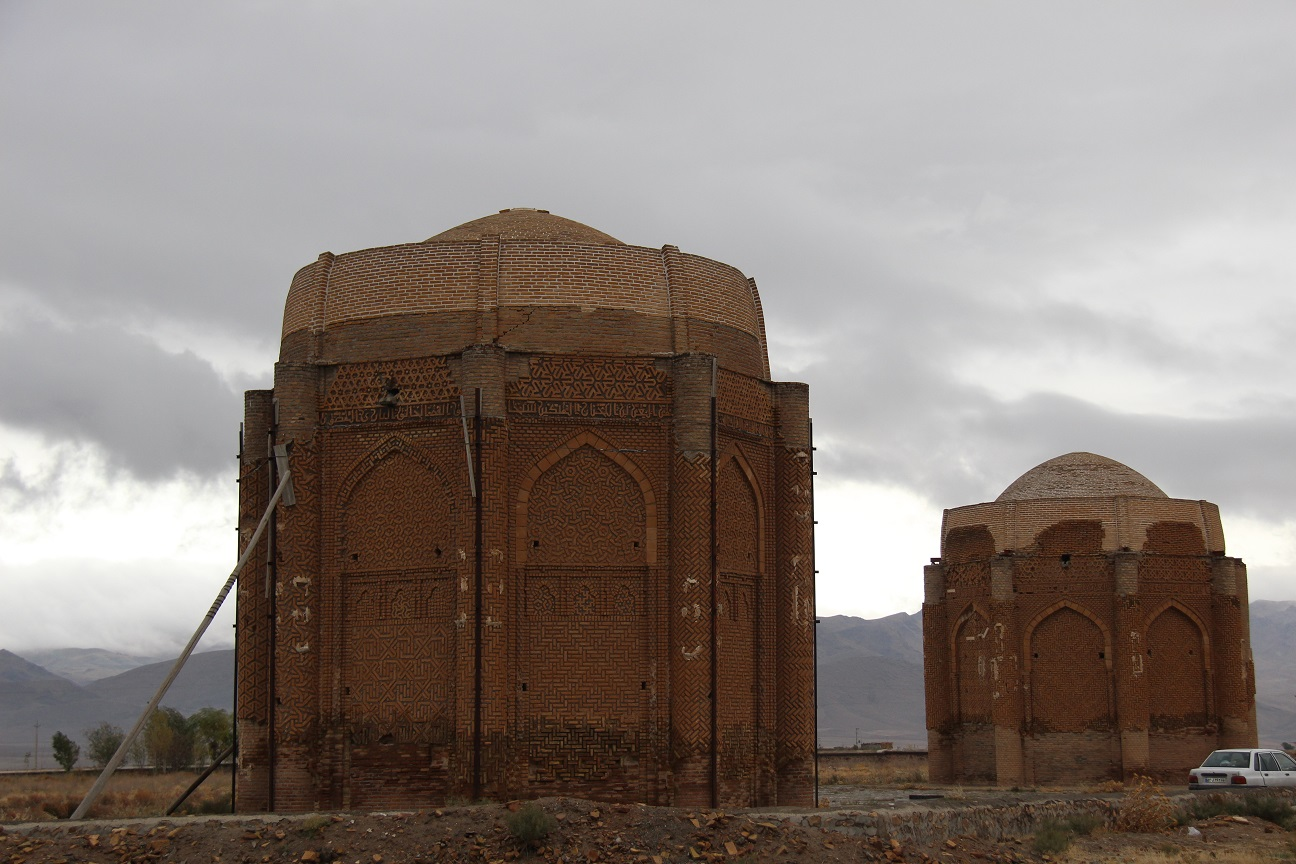
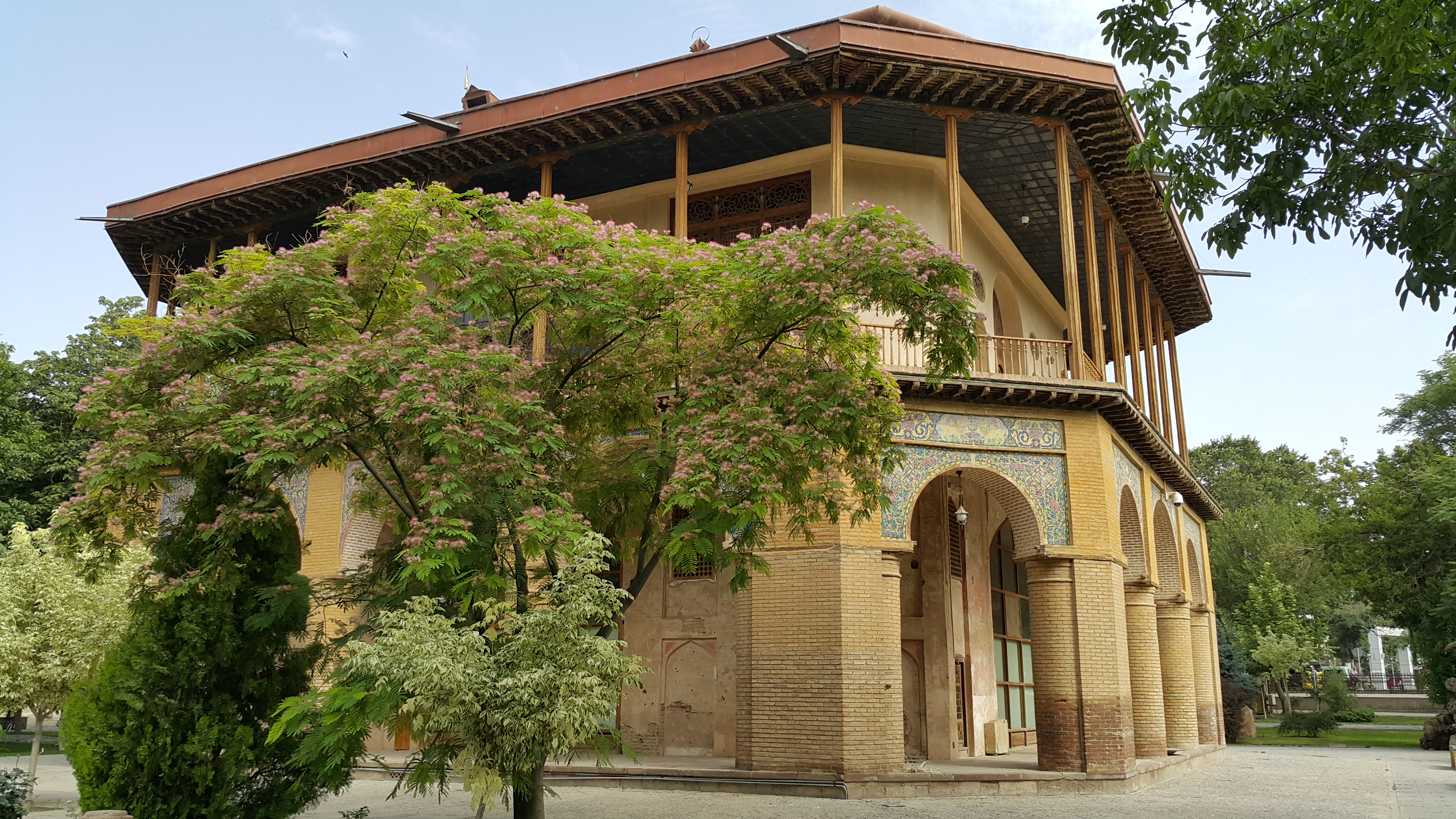

- Coordinates: 36°04′N 49°51′E
- Country: Iran
- Region: Region 1
- Established: 1997
- Capital: Qazvin
- Counties: 6

Government
  - Governor-general: Mohammad Nozari (Reformist)

Area
  - Total: 15,567 km^{2} (6,010 sq mi)

Population (2016)
  - Total: 1,273,761
  - Density: 81.824/km^{2} (211.92/sq mi)
- Time zone: UTC+03:30 (IRST)
- Area code: 28
- HDI (2017): 0.796 high · 14th

Qazvin province (Persian: استان قزوین; IPA: [ɢæzˈviːn]) (Note: Also romanized as Ostān-e Qazvīn) is one of the 31 provinces of Iran. It is in the northwest of the country, with the city of Qazvin as its capital.

The province was carved out of Tehran and Zanjan provinces in 1997. The province was made a part of Region 1 upon the division of the provinces into 5 regions solely for coordination and development purposes on June 22, 2014.

== History ==
Qazvin was the location of a former capital of the Persian Empire and contains over 2000 architectural and archeological sites. It is a provincial capital today that has been a cultural center of mass throughout history.

Archeological findings in the Qazvin plain reveal the existence of urban agricultural settlements as far back as 7000 BC. Significant ancient settlements in the area include Tepe Sagzabad, Tepe Ghabristan, and Teppe Zagheh.

The name "Qazvin" or "Kasbin" is derived from Cas, an ancient tribe that lived south of the Caspian Sea millennia ago. The Caspian Sea itself in fact derives its name from the same origin. Qazvin geographically connects Tehran, Isfahan, and the Persian Gulf to the Caspian seacoast and Asia Minor, hence its strategic location throughout the ages.

Qazvin has been a hotbed of historical developments in Iranian history. In the early years of the Islamic era Qazvin served as a base for the Muslim forces. Destroyed by Genghis Khan (13th century), the Safavid monarchs made Qazvin the capital of the Safavid empire in 1548 only to have it moved to Isfahan in 1598. During the Qajar dynasty and contemporary period, Qazvin has always been one of the most important governmental centers due to its proximity to Tehran. Abbas Mirza, a Crown Prince and Minister of Commerce, was also the governor of Qazvin.

Qazvin is situated close to Alamut, where the famous Hasan-i Sabbah, founder of the secret Ismaili order of the Assassins, operated from.

Qazvin is where the coup d'état of General Reza Khan, with his Russian-trained Cossack brigade, was launched from – which led to the founding of the Pahlavi dynasty in 1921.

1962 Buin Zahra earthquake killed 12.225 people.

== Demographics ==
=== Language and ethnicity ===
The majority of people in the northeast of the province, in Alamut, are Mazandarani or Gilaks who speak a dialect of the Mazandarani or Gilaki language. Other sources say that the majority of people in Alamut are Tats.

=== Population ===
At the time of the 2006 National Census, the province's population was 1,127,734 in 294,305 households. The following census in 2011 counted 1,201,565 inhabitants living in 352,472 households. The 2016 census measured the population of the province as 1,273,761 people in 397,165 households.

=== Administrative divisions ===

The population history and structural changes of Qazvin province's administrative divisions over three consecutive censuses are shown in the following table.

Qazvin Province
Counties	2006	2011	2016
Abyek	89,334	93,844	94,536
Alborz	182,046	203,276	242,865
Avaj (Note: Separated from Buin Zahra County after the 2011 census)	—	—	43,798
Buin Zahra	153,873	164,723	122,994
Qazvin	530,961	566,773	596,932
Takestan	171,520	172,949	172,636
Total	1,127,734	1,201,565	1,273,761

=== Cities ===
According to the 2016 census, 952,149 people (nearly 75% of the population of Qazvin province) live in the following cities:

City	Population
Abgarm	6,336
Abyek	60,107
Alvand	93,836
Ardak	5,043
Avaj	5,142
Bidestan	18,060
Buin Zahra	20,823
Danesfahan	9,434
Eqbaliyeh	55,066
Esfarvarin	12,371
Khak-e Ali	3,148
Khorramdasht	6,554
Kuhin	1,411
Mahmudabad Nemuneh	21,982
Moallem Kalayeh	2,223
Mohammadiyeh	90,513
Narjeh	5,604
Qazvin	402,748
Razmian	1,253
Sagezabad	5,492
Shal	15,290
Sharifiyeh	20,347
Sirdan	805
Takestan	80,299
Ziaabad	8,262

== Geography ==
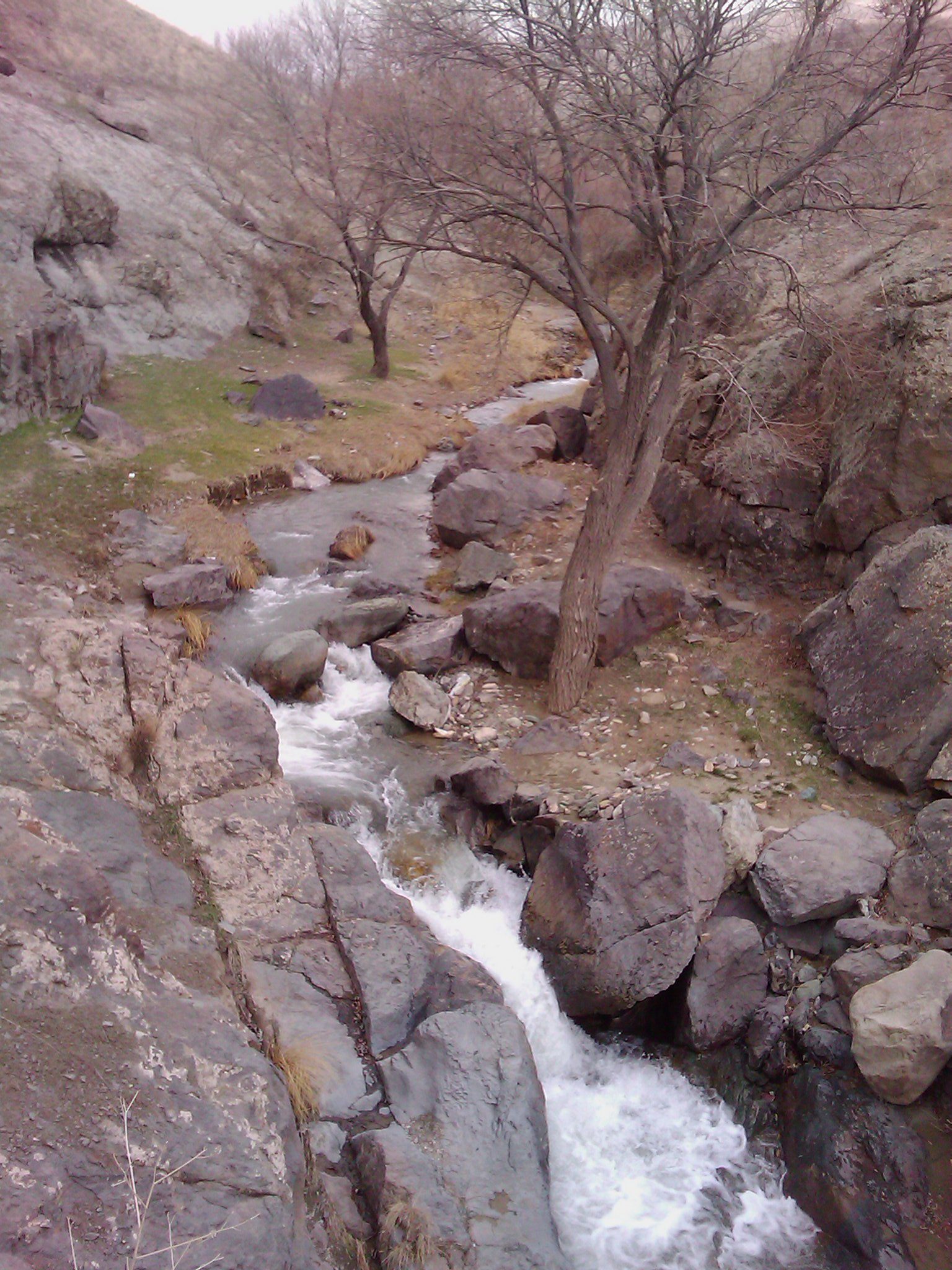
Barajin

The province covers 15821 km^{2} between 48–45 to 50–50 east of Greenwich Meridian of longitude and 35–37 to 36–45 north latitude of the equator. The province is bounded on the north by Mazandaran and Gilan, on the west by Hamedan and Zanjan, on the south by Markazi and on the east by Tehran Provinces. The famous mountains of the province are those of Siälän, Shäh Alborz, Khashchäl, Sephidkouh, Shojä e din, Alehtareh, Rämand, Ägh dägh, Kharaghän, Saridagh, Soltan pïr, and Siähkouh, in which Siälän with a height of 4,175m and Shäh Alborz which is 4,056m are the highest. All are part of the central chain of Alborz. The lowest point of the province is in Tärom e Soflä.

=== Climate ===
The climate of the province in the northern parts is cold and snowy in winters and temperate in summers. In the southern parts, the climate is mild with comparatively cold winters and warm summers.

== Notable sites ==
=== Historical mosques ===
- Al-Nabi Mosque (Soltani Mosque)
- Peighambarieh Shrine: Where four Jewish saints who are said to have foretold the coming of Jesus are buried.

=== Castles and forts ===
These are castles and fortifications mostly from the Isma'ili movement of the Middle Ages:

- Alamout Castle
- Lambesar Castle
- Shemiran Castle
- Meimoon Ghal'eh

=== Traditional reservoirs ===
Of the approximately 100 water reservoirs that were formerly in Qazvin, the transmission 10 are protected by the Provincial Cultural Heritage Organization. See: List of famous ab anbars of Qazvin

=== Bazaars and caravanserais ===
- Sa'd-ol-Saltaneh Complex

=== Bridges ===
- Naderi
- Motahari
- Imam Ali

=== Notable parks ===
- Barajin
- Afarinesh

== Colleges and universities ==
- Imam Khomeini International University
- Islamic Azad University of Qazvin
- Qazvin University of Medical Sciences

== Notable people ==
- Ali Akbar Dehkhoda: linguist and lexicographer, was originally from Qazvin.
- Obeid Zakani: poet (d. 1370)
- Hamdollah Mostowfi: historian and writer (1281–1349)
- Táhirih; 19th century poet, women's rights and religious activist

== See also ==
- Dineh Kuh
