= Emamzadeh =

Emamzadeh or Emam Zadeh (Persian: اِمامزادِه) may refer to:

- Emamzadeh District
- Emam Zadeh, alternate name of Baba Zeyd, Lorestan
- Emamzadeh-ye Kaka Reza
- Emamzadeh Abazar
- Emamzadeh, alternate name of Emamzadeh Ali, Fars, Iran
- Emamzadeh, alternate name of Emam Qeys, Iran
- Emamzadeh, alternate name of Sariyeh Khatun, Iran
- Emamzadeh, Kermanshah
- Emamzadeh, Kohgiluyeh and Boyer-Ahmad
- Emamzadeh Deh Chal, a village in Markazi Province, Iran
- Emamzadeh Qasem (disambiguation), various places in Iran
- Emamzadeh, Qazvin, Iran
- Emamzadeh, alternate name of Yaleh Gonbad, Iran
- Emamzadeh Ala Eddin, Iran
- Emamzadeh, West Azerbaijan

== See also ==
- Emamzadeh is a common element in Iranian place names; see
