= Khorus Darreh =

Village in Qazvin province, Iran

Khorus Darreh Persian: خروس دره
- Village
- Location within Iran
- Coordinates: 35°31′00″N 49°13′27″E
- Country: Iran
- Province: Qazvin
- County: Avaj
- District: Central
- Rural District: Shahidabad

Population (2016)
  - Total: 368
- Time zone: UTC+3:30 (IRST)

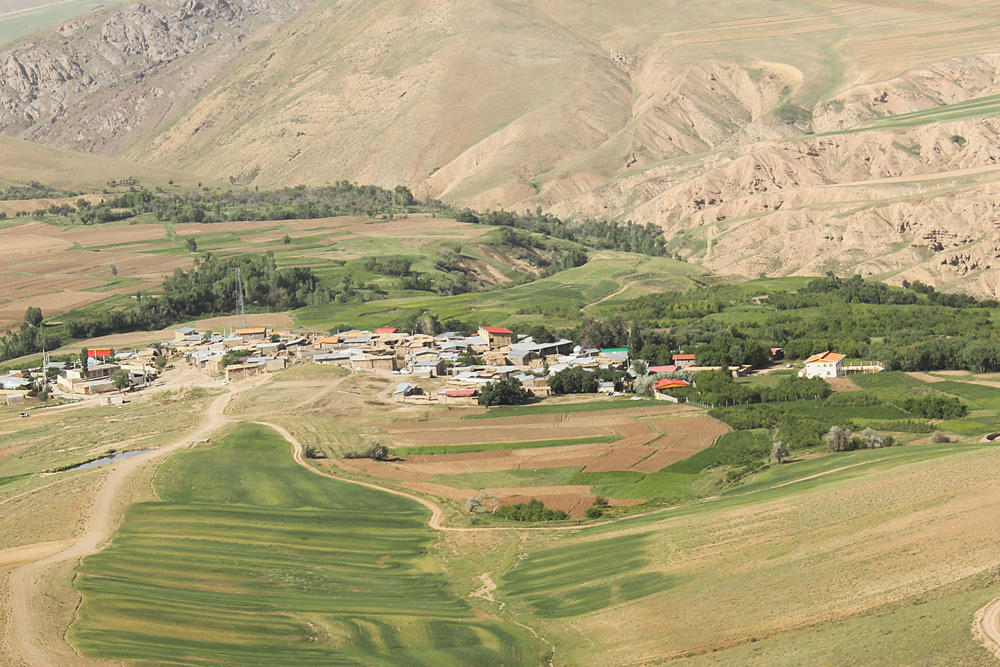
Aerial view of Khorus Darreh

Khorus Darreh (Persian: خروس دره) (Note: Also romanized as Kharūs Darreh, Khoroos Darreh, and Khorūs Darreh; also known as Khurus Darreh) is a village in Shahidabad Rural District of the Central District in Avaj County, Qazvin province, Iran.

== Demographics ==
=== Population ===
At the time of the 2006 National Census, the village's population was 247 in 70 households, when it was in the former Avaj District of Buin Zahra County. The following census in 2011 counted 274 people in 96 households. The 2016 census measured the population of the village as 368 people in 130 households, by which time the district had been separated from the county in the establishment of Avaj County. The rural district was transferred to the new Central District.
