= Arvan =

Village in Qazvin province, Iran

Arvan Persian: اروان
- Village
- Location within Iran
- Coordinates: 35°36′53″N 49°10′11″E
- Country: Iran
- Province: Qazvin
- County: Avaj
- District: Central
- Rural District: Kharaqan-e Gharbi

Population (2016)
  - Total: 347
- Time zone: UTC+3:30 (IRST)

Arvan (Persian: اروان) (Note: Also romanized as Arvān) is a village in Kharaqan-e Gharbi Rural District of the Central District in Avaj County, Qazvin province, Iran.

== Demographics ==
=== Population ===
At the time of the 2006 National Census, the village's population was 432 in 121 households, when it was in the former Avaj District of Buin Zahra County. The following census in 2011 counted 419 people in 133 households. The 2016 census measured the population of the village as 347 people in 126 households, by which time the district had been separated from the county in the establishment of Avaj County. The rural district was transferred to the new Central District. It was the most populous village in its rural district.
