= Shur Ab, Qazvin =

Village in Qazvin province, Iran

Shur Ab Persian: شورآب
- Village
- Location within Iran
- Coordinates: 35°42′51″N 49°06′21″E
- Country: Iran
- Province: Qazvin
- County: Avaj
- District: Central
- Rural District: Kharaqan-e Gharbi

Population (2016)
  - Total: 322
- Time zone: UTC+3:30 (IRST)

Shur Ab (Persian: شورآب) (Note: Also romanized as Shoorab and Shūr Āb) is a village in Kharaqan-e Gharbi Rural District of the Central District in Avaj County, Qazvin province, Iran.

== Demographics ==
=== Population ===
At the time of the 2006 National Census, the village's population was 232 in 64 households, when it was in the former Avaj District of Buin Zahra County. The following census in 2011 counted 297 people in 100 households. The 2016 census measured the population of the village as 322 people in 107 households, by which time the district had been separated from the county in the establishment of Avaj County. The rural district was transferred to the new Central District. It was the most populous village in its rural district.
