= Harain-e Olya =

Village in Qazvin province, Iran

Harain-e Olya Persian: هرائين عليا
- Village
- Location within Iran
- Coordinates: 35°29′52″N 49°20′10″E
- Country: Iran
- Province: Qazvin
- County: Avaj
- District: Central
- Rural District: Shahidabad

Population (2016)
  - Total: 1,284
- Time zone: UTC+3:30 (IRST)

Harain-e Olya (Persian: هرائين عليا) (Note: Also romanized as Harā’īn-e ‘Olyā, Harā’īn Owlyā, and Haraīyan Ūlīya; also known as Harā’īn and Harāyen) is a village in Shahidabad Rural District of the Central District in Avaj County, Qazvin province, Iran.

== Demographics ==
=== Population ===
At the time of the 2006 National Census, the village's population was 1,112 in 277 households, when it was in the former Avaj District of Buin Zahra County. The following census in 2011 counted 996 people in 319 households. The 2016 census measured the population of the village as 1,284 people in 411 households, by which time the district had been separated from the county in the establishment of Avaj County. The rural district was transferred to the new Central District.
