= Estalaj =

Village in Qazvin province, Iran

Estalaj Persian: استلج
- Village
- Location within Iran
- Coordinates: 35°27′59″N 49°29′36″E
- Country: Iran
- Province: Qazvin
- County: Avaj
- District: Central
- Rural District: Shahidabad

Population (2016)
  - Total: 842
- Time zone: UTC+3:30 (IRST)

Estalaj (Persian: استلج) (Note: Also romanized as Estelaj; also known as Astalach and Astlaj) is a village in Shahidabad Rural District of the Central District in Avaj County, Qazvin province, Iran.

== Demographics ==
=== Population ===
At the time of the 2006 National Census, the village's population was 874 in 210 households, when it was in the former Avaj District of Buin Zahra County. The following census in 2011 counted 759 people in 222 households. The 2016 census measured the population of the village as 842 people in 254 households, by which time the district had been separated from the county in the establishment of Avaj County. The rural district was transferred to the new Central District.
