= Ilderjin =

Ilderjin ايلدرجين
- Village
- Location within Iran
- Coordinates: 35°42′26″N 49°22′42″E
- Country: Iran
- Province: Qazvin
- County: Avaj
- Bakhsh: Abgarm
- Rural District: Kharaqan-e Sharqi

Population (2017)
  - Total: 198
- Time zone: UTC+3:30 (IRST)
  - Summer (DST): UTC+4:30 (IRDT)

Ilderjin (Persian: ايلدرجين, also Romanized as Īlderjīn, Īldarchīn, Ildarjin, and Ildrajīn; also known as Andarjīn, Enderajīn, Enderjīn, and Indrājīn) is a village in Kharaqan-e Sharqi Rural District, Abgarm District, Avaj County, Qazvin Province, Iran. At the 2017 census, its population was 198. for getting more information about this village please visit this article on Persian Wikipedia.
