= Changureh, Avaj =

Village in Qazvin province, Iran

Changureh Persian: چنگوره
- Village
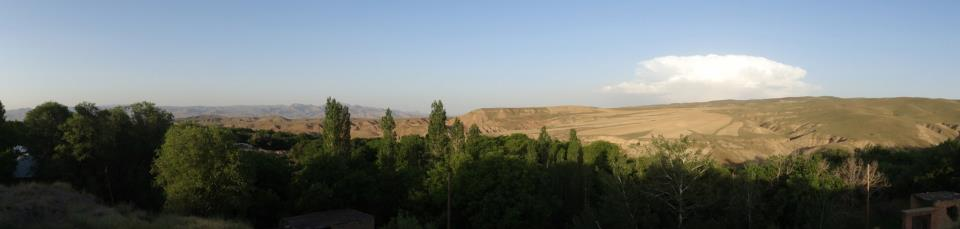
- The village of Changureh

- Location within Iran
- Coordinates: 35°46′30″N 48°57′49″E
- Country: Iran
- Province: Qazvin
- County: Avaj
- District: Central
- Rural District: Hesar-e Valiyeasr

Population (2016)
  - Total: 308
- Time zone: UTC+3:30 (IRST)

Changureh (Persian: چنگوره) (Note: Also romanized as Changūrah and Changūreh; also known as Changooreh Kharaghan Gharbi and Jānkūra) is a village in Hesar-e Valiyeasr Rural District of the Central District in Avaj County, Qazvin province, Iran. Changureh suffered severely in the 2002 Bou'in-Zahra earthquake, the epicenter of which was located near the village.

== Demographics ==
=== Population ===
At the time of the 2006 National Census, the village's population was 54 in 18 households, when it was in the former Avaj District of Buin Zahra County. The following census in 2011 counted 348 people in 141 households. The 2016 census measured the population of the village as 308 people in 110 households, by which time the district had been separated from the county in the establishment of Avaj County. The rural district was transferred to the new Central District.
