= Azanbar =

Village in Qazvin province, Iran

Azanbar Persian: ازانبار
- Village
- Location within Iran
- Coordinates: 35°52′30″N 48°49′09″E
- Country: Iran
- Province: Qazvin
- County: Avaj
- District: Central
- Rural District: Hesar-e Valiyeasr

Population (2016)
  - Total: 622
- Time zone: UTC+3:30 (IRST)

Azanbar (Persian: ازانبار) (Note: Also romanized as Āzanbār; also known as Āzambār) is a village in Hesar-e Valiyeasr Rural District of the Central District in Avaj County, Qazvin province, Iran.

== Demographics ==
=== Population ===
At the time of the 2006 National Census, the village's population was 745 in 178 households, when it was in the former Avaj District of Buin Zahra County. The following census in 2011 counted 638 people in 183 households. The 2016 census measured the population of the village as 622 people in 191 households, by which time the district had been separated from the county in the establishment of Avaj County. The rural district was transferred to the new Central District.
