= Adar, Iran =

Adar ادار
- Village
- Location within Iran
- Coordinates: 35°44′01″N 48°49′42″E
- Country: Iran
- Province: Qazvin
- County: Avaj
- Bakhsh: Central
- Rural District: Hesar-e Valiyeasr

Population (2006)
  - Total: 388
- Time zone: UTC+3:30 (IRST)

Adar (Persian: ادار, also Romanized as Ādār; also known as Adād and Āvār) is a village in Hesar-e Valiyeasr Rural District, Central District, Avaj County, Qazvin Province, Iran. At the 2006 census, its population was 388, in 82 families.
