= Aliabad, Hesar-e Valiyeasr =

Aliabad علي اباد
- Village
- Location within Iran
- Coordinates: 35°49′02″N 48°55′05″E
- Country: Iran
- Province: Qazvin
- County: Avaj
- Bakhsh: Central
- Rural District: Hesar-e Valiyeasr

Population (2006)
  - Total: 143
- Time zone: UTC+3:30 (IRST)

Aliabad (Persian: علي اباد, also Romanized as ‘Alīābād) is a village in Hesar-e Valiyeasr Rural District, Central District, Avaj County, Qazvin Province, Iran. At the 2006 census, its population was 143, in 50 families.

Aliabad suffered severely in the 2002 Bou'in-Zahra earthquake.
