= Kameshkan =

Kameshkan كامشكان
- Village
- Location within Iran
- Coordinates: 35°44′32″N 48°56′12″E
- Country: Iran
- Province: Qazvin
- County: Avaj
- Bakhsh: Central District
- Rural District: Hesar-e Valiyeasr

Population (2006)
  - Total: 86
- Time zone: UTC+3:30 (IRST)

Kameshkan (Persian: كامشكان, also Romanized as Kāmeshkān, Kāmeshgān, and Kāmeskān; also known as Kameshan and Kāshgān) is a village in Hesar-e Valiyeasr Rural District, Central District, Avaj County, Qazvin Province, Iran. At the 2006 census, its population was 86, in 31 families.
