= Miandarreh =

Miandarreh or Mian Darreh or Meyan Darreh (Persian: ميان دره) may refer to:

- Miandarreh, Golestan
- Mian Darreh Jowkar, Kohgiluyeh and Boyer-Ahmad Province
- Mian Darreh, Mazandaran
- Miandarreh, Qazvin
- Mian Darreh, Zanjan
