= Dashtak, Qazvin =

Village in Qazvin province, Iran

Dashtak Persian: دشتك
- Village
- Location within Iran
- Coordinates: 35°54′32″N 48°55′14″E
- Country: Iran
- Province: Qazvin
- County: Avaj
- District: Central
- Rural District: Hesar-e Valiyeasr

Population (2016)
  - Total: 1,332
- Time zone: UTC+3:30 (IRST)

Dashtak (Persian: دشتك) (Note: Also known as Tāis Tāq and Tāys Dāgh) is a village in Hesar-e Valiyeasr Rural District of the Central District in Avaj County, Qazvin province, Iran.

== Demographics ==
=== Ethnicity ===
The village is populated by Azerbaijani Turks.

=== Population ===
At the time of the 2006 National Census, the village's population was 1,265 in 308 households, when it was in the former Avaj District of Buin Zahra County. The following census in 2011 counted 1,306 people in 374 households. The 2016 census measured the population of the village as 1,332 people in 386 households, by which time the district had been separated from the county in the establishment of Avaj County. The rural district was transferred to the new Central District.
