= Parsbanaj =

Village in Qazvin province, Iran

Parsbanaj Persian: پرسبانج
- Village
- Location within Iran
- Coordinates: 35°28′25″N 49°23′18″E
- Country: Iran
- Province: Qazvin
- County: Avaj
- District: Central
- Rural District: Shahidabad

Population (2016)
  - Total: 890
- Time zone: UTC+3:30 (IRST)

Parsbanaj (Persian: پرسبانج) (Note: Also romanized as Parsbānaj and Parsbānej; also known as Parastanaj, Parīs Banīch, Parīs Bīnaj, and Parnespānej) is a village in Shahidabad Rural District of the Central District in Avaj County, Qazvin province, Iran.

== Demographics ==
=== Population ===
At the time of the 2006 National Census, the village's population was 1,228 in 261 households, when it was in the former Avaj District of Buin Zahra County. The following census in 2011 counted 1,085 people in 277 households. The 2016 census measured the population of the village as 890 people in 249 households, by which time the district had been separated from the county in the establishment of Avaj County. The rural district was transferred to the new Central District.
