= Mahmudabad, Avaj =

Village in Qazvin province, Iran

Mahmudabad Persian: محموداباد
- Village
- Location within Iran
- Coordinates: 35°50′06″N 49°04′22″E
- Country: Iran
- Province: Qazvin
- County: Avaj
- District: Central
- Rural District: Hesar-e Valiyeasr

Population (2016)
  - Total: 338
- Time zone: UTC+3:30 (IRST)

Mahmudabad (Persian: محموداباد) (Note: Also romanized as Maḩmūdābād; also known as Mahmood Abad Afshariyeh) is a village in Hesar-e Valiyeasr Rural District of the Central District in Avaj County, Qazvin province, Iran.

== Demographics ==
=== Population ===
At the time of the 2006 National Census, the village's population was 267 in 55 households, when it was in the former Avaj District of Buin Zahra County. The following census in 2011 counted 246 people in 59 households. The 2016 census measured the population of the village as 338 people in 100 households, by which time the district had been separated from the county in the establishment of Avaj County. The rural district was transferred to the new Central District.
