= Didar =

Didar ديدار
- Village
- Location within Iran
- Coordinates: 35°49′27″N 48°51′37″E
- Country: Iran
- Province: Qazvin
- County: Avaj
- Bakhsh: Central
- Rural District: Hesar-e Valiyeasr

Population (2006)
  - Total: 358
- Time zone: UTC+3:30 (IRST)

Didar (Persian: ديدار, also Romanized as Dīdār) is a village in Hesar-e Valiyeasr Rural District, Central District, Avaj County, Qazvin Province, Iran. At the 2006 census, its population was 358, in 88 families.
