= Shahidabad, Qazvin =

Village in Qazvin province, Iran

Shahidabad Persian: شهیدآباد
- Village
- Location within Iran
- Coordinates: 35°31′25″N 49°17′15″E
- Country: Iran
- Province: Qazvin
- County: Avaj
- District: Central
- Rural District: Shahidabad

Population (2016)
  - Total: 1,418
- Time zone: UTC+3:30 (IRST)

Shahidabad (Persian: شهیدآباد) (Note: Also romanized as Shahīdābād; also known as Gaveyk, Gāvīk, and Gavyal) is a village in, and the capital of, Shahidabad Rural District in the Central District of Avaj County, Qazvin province, Iran.

== Demographics ==
=== Population ===
At the time of the 2006 National Census, the village's population was 1,466 in 385 households, when it was in the former Avaj District of Buin Zahra County. The following census in 2011 counted 1,463 people in 435 households. The 2016 census measured the population of the village as 1,418 people in 463 households, by which time the district had been separated from the county in the establishment of Avaj County. The rural district was transferred to the new Central District. It was the most populous village in its rural district.
