= Qahvaj =

Village in Qazvin province, Iran

Qahvaj Persian: قهوج
- Village
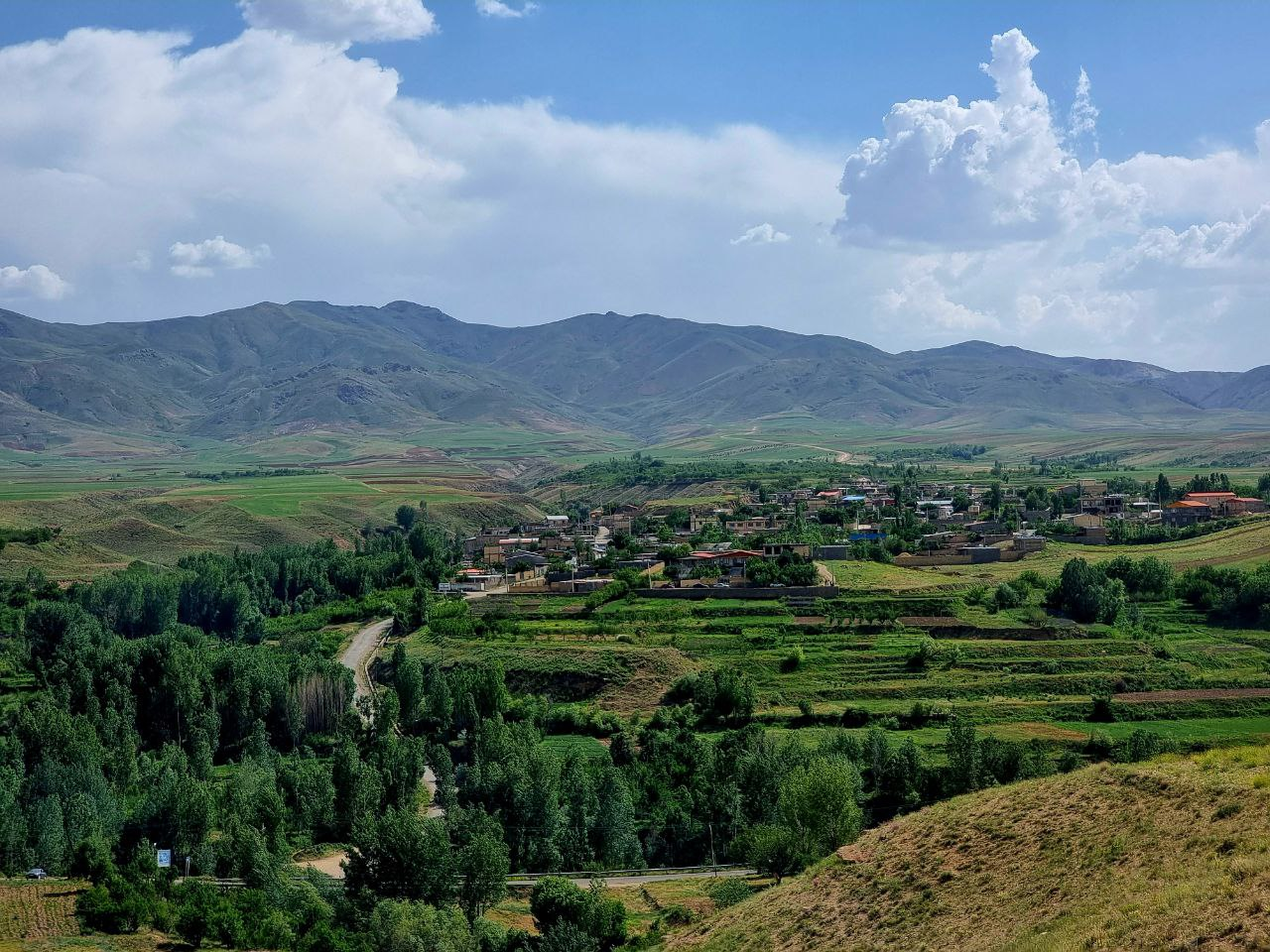
- The village of Qahvaj in 2023

- Location within Iran
- Coordinates: 35°31′29″N 49°16′02″E
- Country: Iran
- Province: Qazvin
- County: Avaj
- District: Central
- Rural District: Shahidabad

Population (2016)
  - Total: 815
- Time zone: UTC+3:30 (IRST)

Qahvaj (Persian: قهوج) (Note: Also romanized as Qahvej; also known as Ghahooj, Qahwa, and Qahwach) is a village in Shahidabad Rural District of the Central District in Avaj County, Qazvin province, Iran.

== Demographics ==
=== Population ===
At the time of the 2006 National Census, the village's population was 849 in 166 households, when it was in the former Avaj District of Buin Zahra County. The following census in 2011 counted 1,197 people in 231 households. The 2016 census measured the population of the village as 815 people in 253 households, by which time the district had been separated from the county in the establishment of Avaj County. The rural district was transferred to the new Central District.
