= Lak, Qazvin =

Village in Qazvin province, Iran

Lak Persian: لك
- Village
- Location within Iran
- Coordinates: 35°53′07″N 48°59′07″E
- Country: Iran
- Province: Qazvin
- County: Avaj
- District: Central
- Rural District: Hesar-e Valiyeasr

Population (2016)
  - Total: 455
- Time zone: UTC+3:30 (IRST)

Lak (Persian: لك) (Note: Also known as Laik and Lak-e Bozorg) is a village in Hesar-e Valiyeasr Rural District of the Central District in Avaj County, Qazvin province, Iran.

== Demographics ==
=== Population ===
At the time of the 2006 National Census, the village's population was 654 in 136 households, when it was in the former Avaj District of Buin Zahra County. The following census in 2011 counted 545 people in 133 households. The 2016 census measured the population of the village as 455 people in 125 households, by which time the district had been separated from the county in the establishment of Avaj County. The rural district was transferred to the new Central District.
