= Biglar, Qazvin =

Biglar بيگلر
- Village
- Location within Iran
- Coordinates: 35°49′41″N 49°11′32″E
- Country: Iran
- Province: Qazvin
- County: Avaj
- Bakhsh: Abgarm
- Rural District: Abgarm

Population (2006)
  - Total: 120
- Time zone: UTC+3:30 (IRST)
  - Summer (DST): UTC+4:30 (IRDT)

Biglar (Persian: بيگلر, also Romanized as Bīglar, Beyglar, Baglar, and Bayglar; also known as Bāilar and Bāylar) is a village in Abgarm Rural District, Abgarm District, Avaj County, Qazvin Province, Iran. At the 2006 census, its population was 120, in 26 families.
