= Esmailabad, Avaj =

Esmailabad اسماعيل اباد
- Village
- Location within Iran
- Coordinates: 35°45′54″N 48°55′21″E
- Country: Iran
- Province: Qazvin
- County: Avaj
- Bakhsh: Central
- Rural District: Hesar-e Valiyeasr

Population (2006)
  - Total: 158
- Time zone: UTC+3:30 (IRST)

Esmailabad (Persian: اسماعيل اباد, also Romanized as Esmā‘īlābād; also known as Khorkhoreh) is a village in Hesar-e Valiyeasr Rural District, Central District, Avaj County, Qazvin Province, Iran. At the 2006 Census, its population was 158, in 44 families.

Esmailabad suffered severely in the 2002 Bou'in-Zahra earthquake.
