= Saidabad, Avaj =

Village in Qazvin province, Iran

Saidabad Persian: سعيداباد
- Village
- Location within Iran
- Coordinates: 35°45′26″N 49°05′15″E
- Country: Iran
- Province: Qazvin
- County: Avaj
- District: Central
- Rural District: Hesar-e Valiyeasr

Population (2016)
  - Total: 337
- Time zone: UTC+3:30 (IRST)

Saidabad (Persian: سعيداباد) (Note: Also romanized as Sa‘īdābād and Saiyidābād; also known as Sa‘id Abad Kharaghan Gharbi) is a village in Hesar-e Valiyeasr Rural District of the Central District in Avaj County, Qazvin province, Iran.

== Demographics ==
=== Population ===
At the time of the 2006 National Census, the village's population was 93 in 24 households, when it was in the former Avaj District of Buin Zahra County. The following census in 2011 counted 370 people in 100 households. The 2016 census measured the population of the village as 337 people in 93 households, by which time the district had been separated from the county in the establishment of Avaj County. The rural district was transferred to the new Central District.
