= Ab Darreh, Qazvin =

Ab Darreh آبدره
- village
- Location within Iran
- Coordinates: 35°47′39″N 49°01′16″E
- Country: Iran
- Province: Qazvin
- County: Avaj
- Bakhsh: Central
- Rural District: Hesar-e Valiyeasr

Government

Population (2020)
  - Total: 100
- Time zone: UTC+3:30 (IRST)

Ab Darreh (Persian: ابدره, also Romanized as Āb Darreh) is a village in Hesar-e Valiyeasr Rural District, Central District, Avaj County, Qazvin Province, Iran. At the 2006 census, its population was 94, in 29 families. Ab Darreh suffered severely in the 2002 Bou'in-Zahra earthquake.
