= Chubineh, Qazvin =

Chubineh چوبينه
- Village
- Location within Iran
- Coordinates: 35°33′03″N 49°15′24″E
- Country: Iran
- Province: Qazvin
- County: Avaj
- Bakhsh: Central
- Rural District: Shahidabad

Population (2006)
  - Total: 164
- Time zone: UTC+3:30 (IRST)

Chubineh (Persian: چوبينه, also romanized as Chūbīneh) is a village in Shahidabad Rural District, Central District, Avaj County, Qazvin Province, Iran. At the 2006 census its population was 164, in 53 families.
