= Mesrabad, Qazvin =

Mesrabad مصراباد
- Village
- Location within Iran
- Coordinates: 35°38′22″N 49°26′35″E
- Country: Iran
- Province: Qazvin
- County: Avaj
- Bakhsh: Abgarm
- Rural District: Kharaqan-e Sharqi

Population (2006)
  - Total: 169
- Time zone: UTC+3:30 (IRST)
  - Summer (DST): UTC+4:30 (IRDT)

Mesrabad (Persian: مصراباد, also Romanized as Meşrābād and Mīsrābād) is a village in Kharaqan-e Sharqi Rural District, Abgarm District, Avaj County, Qazvin Province, Iran. At the 2006 census, its population was 169, in 57 families.
