= Tuabad =

Village in Qazvin province, Iran

Tuabad Persian: تواباد
- Village
- Location within Iran
- Coordinates: 35°35′16″N 49°29′01″E
- Country: Iran
- Province: Qazvin
- County: Avaj
- District: Abgarm
- Rural District: Kharaqan-e Sharqi

Population (2016)
  - Total: 682
- Time zone: UTC+3:30 (IRST)

Tuabad (Persian: تواباد) (Note: Also romanized as To Abad and Tūābād; also known as Nowābād and Tūba) is a village in Kharaqan-e Sharqi Rural District of Abgarm District in Avaj County, Qazvin province, Iran.

== Demographics ==
=== Population ===
At the time of the 2006 National Census, the village's population was 509 in 127 households, when it was in Buin Zahra County. The following census in 2011 counted 452 people in 143 households. The 2016 census measured the population of the village as 682 people in 218 households, by which time the district had been separated from the county in the establishment of Avaj County.
