= Arteshabad =

Village in Qazvin province, Iran

Arteshabad Persian: ارتش اباد
- Village
- Location within Iran
- Coordinates: 35°40′13″N 49°26′07″E
- Country: Iran
- Province: Qazvin
- County: Avaj
- District: Abgarm
- Rural District: Kharaqan-e Sharqi

Population (2016)
  - Total: 728
- Time zone: UTC+3:30 (IRST)

Arteshabad (Persian: ارتش اباد) (Note: Also romanized as Arteshābād; also known as Sekmesābād) is a village in Kharaqan-e Sharqi Rural District of Abgarm District in Avaj County, Qazvin province, Iran.

== Demographics ==
=== Population ===
At the time of the 2006 National Census, the village's population was 659 in 200 households, when it was in Buin Zahra County. The following census in 2011 counted 996 people in 321 households. The 2016 census measured the population of the village as 728 people in 248 households, by which time the district had been separated from the county in the establishment of Avaj County.
