= Danak =

Village in Qazvin province, Iran

Danak Persian: دانك
- Village
- Location within Iran
- Coordinates: 35°30′36″N 49°35′09″E
- Country: Iran
- Province: Qazvin
- County: Avaj
- District: Abgarm
- Rural District: Kharaqan-e Sharqi

Population (2016)
  - Total: 477
- Time zone: UTC+3:30 (IRST)

Danak (Persian: دانك) (Note: Also romanized as Dānak; also known as Yal Karpī) is a village in Kharaqan-e Sharqi Rural District of Abgarm District in Avaj County, Qazvin province, Iran.

== Demographics ==
=== Population ===
At the time of the 2006 National Census, the village's population was 374 in 92 households, when it was in Buin Zahra County. The following census in 2011 counted 391 people in 124 households. The 2016 census measured the population of the village as 477 people in 156 households, by which time the district had been separated from the county in the establishment of Avaj County.
