= Hesar-e Valiyeasr =

Village in Qazvin province, Iran

Hesar-e Valiyeasr Persian: حصار ولي عصر
- Village
- Location within Iran
- Coordinates: 35°50′07″N 49°01′39″E
- Country: Iran
- Province: Qazvin
- County: Avaj
- District: Central
- Rural District: Hesar-e Valiyeasr

Population (2016)
  - Total: 904
- Time zone: UTC+3:30 (IRST)

Hesar-e Valiyeasr (Persian: حصار ولي عصر) (Note: Also romanized as Heṣār-e Valīyeʿaṣr,) is a village in, and the capital of, Hesar-e Valiyeasr Rural District in the Central District of Avaj County, Qazvin province, Iran.

== Demographics ==
=== Population ===
At the time of the 2006 National Census, the village's population was 666 in 170 households, when it was in the former Avaj District of Buin Zahra County. The following census in 2011 counted 853 people in 258 households. The 2016 census measured the population of the village as 904 people in 247 households, by which time the district had been separated from the county in the establishment of Avaj County. The rural district was transferred to the new Central District.
