= Dakhrajin =

Village in Qazvin province, Iran

Dakhrajin Persian: داخرجين
- Village
- Location within Iran
- Coordinates: 35°45′11″N 49°13′29″E
- Country: Iran
- Province: Qazvin
- County: Avaj
- District: Abgarm
- Rural District: Abgarm

Population (2016)
  - Total: 411
- Time zone: UTC+3:30 (IRST)

Dakhrajin (Persian: داخرجين) (Note: Also romanized as Dākharjīn and Dakhrajīn) is a village in Abgarm Rural District of Abgarm District in Avaj County, Qazvin province, Iran.

== Demographics ==
=== Population ===
At the time of the 2006 National Census, the village's population was 562 in 135 households, when it was in Buin Zahra County. The following census in 2011 counted 472 people in 143 households. The 2016 census measured the population of the village as 411 people in 131 households, by which time the district had been separated from the county in the establishment of Avaj County.
