= Qarah Dash Parchik =

Village in Qazvin province, Iran

Qarah Dash Parchik Persian: قره داش پرچيك
- Village
- Location within Iran
- Coordinates: 35°31′59″N 49°28′29″E
- Country: Iran
- Province: Qazvin
- County: Avaj
- District: Abgarm
- Rural District: Kharaqan-e Sharqi

Population (2016)
  - Total: 369
- Time zone: UTC+3:30 (IRST)

Qarah Dash Parchik (Persian: قره داش پرچيك) (Note: Also romanized as Qarah Dāsh Parchīk) is a village in Kharaqan-e Sharqi Rural District of Abgarm District in Avaj County, Qazvin province, Iran.

== Demographics ==
=== Population ===
At the time of the 2006 National Census, the village's population was 351 in 81 households, when it was in Buin Zahra County. The following census in 2011 counted 349 people in 105 households. The 2016 census measured the population of the village as 369 people in 119 households, by which time the district had been separated from the county in the establishment of Avaj County.
