= Beheshtian =

Village in Qazvin province, Iran

Beheshtian Persian: بهشتيان
- Village
- Location within Iran
- Coordinates: 35°42′48″N 49°13′38″E
- Country: Iran
- Province: Qazvin
- County: Avaj
- District: Abgarm
- Rural District: Abgarm

Population (2016)
  - Total: 368
- Time zone: UTC+3:30 (IRST)

Beheshtian (Persian: بهشتيان) (Note: Also romanized as Beheshtīān) is a village in Abgarm Rural District of Abgarm District in Avaj County, Qazvin province, Iran.

== Demographics ==
=== Population ===
At the time of the 2006 National Census, the village's population was 382 in 99 households, when it was in Buin Zahra County. The following census in 2011 counted 339 people in 112 households. The 2016 census measured the population of the village as 368 people in 117 households, by which time the district had been separated from the county in the establishment of Avaj County.
