= Miandarreh, Qazvin =

Miandarreh ميان دره
- Village
- Location within Iran
- Coordinates: 35°42′05″N 49°26′48″E
- Country: Iran
- Province: Qazvin
- County: Avaj
- Bakhsh: Abgarm
- Rural District: Kharaqan-e Sharqi

Population (2006)
  - Total: 11
- Time zone: UTC+3:30 (IRST)
  - Summer (DST): UTC+4:30 (IRDT)

Miandarreh (Persian: ميان دره, also Romanized as Mīāndarreh) is a village situated in Kharaqan-e Sharqi Rural District, Abgarm District, Avaj County, Qazvin Province, Iran. At the 2006 census, its population was 11, in 5 families.
