= Abdollah Masud-e Sofla =

Abdollah Masud-e Sofla عبداله مسعودسفلي
- Village
- Location within Iran
- Coordinates: 35°45′55″N 48°48′45″E
- Country: Iran
- Province: Qazvin
- County: Avaj
- Bakhsh: Central
- Rural District: Hesar-e Valiyeasr

Population (2006)
  - Total: 72
- Time zone: UTC+3:30 (IRST)

Abdollah Masud-e Sofla (Persian: عبداله مسعودسفلي, also Romanized as ‘Abdollāh Mas‘ūd-e Soflá; also known as Abdollah Mas’ood, ‘Abdollāh Mas‘ūd, and Abdullāh Masūd) is a village in Hesar-e Valiyeasr Rural District, Central District, Avaj County, Qazvin Province, Iran. At the 2006 census, its population was 72, in 15 families.
