= Sir Ab =

Sir Ab or Sirab (Persian: سيراب) may refer to:

- Sirab, Hamadan
- Sir Ab, Qazvin

== See also ==
- Sirab, Azerbaijan
