= Emamzadeh Ala ol Din =

Village in Qazvin province, Iran

Emamzadeh Ala ol Din Persian: امامزاده علاءالدین
- Village
- Location within Iran
- Coordinates: 35°39′10″N 49°05′14″E
- Country: Iran
- Province: Qazvin
- County: Avaj
- District: Central
- Rural District: Kharaqan-e Gharbi

Population (2016)
  - Total: 235
- Time zone: UTC+3:30 (IRST)

Emamzadeh Ala ol Din (Persian: امامزاده علاءالدین) (Note: Also known as Emamzadeh Ala Eddin, also romanized as Emāmzādeh ‘Alā Eddīn and Emāmzādeh ‘Alā’ Eddīn) is a village in Kharaqan-e Gharbi Rural District of the Central District in Avaj County, Qazvin province, Iran.

== Demographics ==
=== Population ===
At the time of the 2006 National Census, the village's population was 284 in 84 households, when it was in the former Avaj District of Buin Zahra County. The following census in 2011 counted 220 people in 68 households. The 2016 census measured the population of the village as 235 people in 86 households, by which time the district had been separated from the county in the establishment of Avaj County. The rural district was transferred to the new Central District. It was the most populous village in its rural district.
