= Milaq, Qazvin =

Milaq ميلاق
- Village
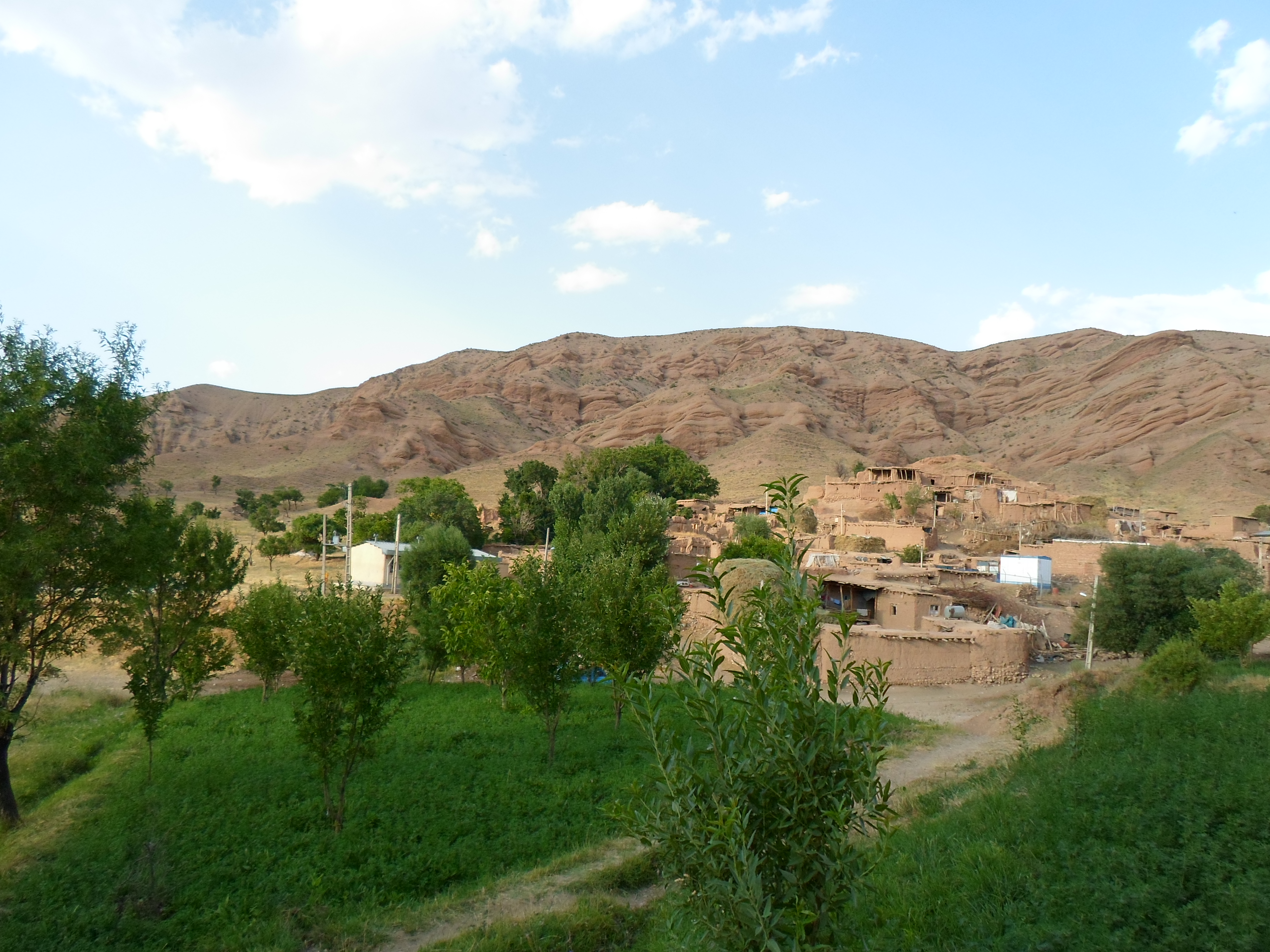

- Location within Iran
- Coordinates: 35°34′40″N 49°24′50″E
- Country: Iran
- Province: Qazvin
- County: Avaj
- Bakhsh: Abgarm
- Rural District: Kharaqan-e Sharqi

Population (2006)
  - Total: 63
- Time zone: UTC+3:30 (IRST)
  - Summer (DST): UTC+4:30 (IRDT)

Milaq (Persian: ميلاق, also Romanized as Mīlāq, Milagh, and Meylāq; also known as Chāy Mīlāq and Mīlāq-i-Sufla) is a village in Kharaqan-e Sharqi Rural District, Abgarm District, Avaj County, Qazvin Province, Iran. At the 2006 census, its population was 63, in 13 families.
