= Abdollah Masud-e Olya =

Abdollah Masud-e Olya عبداله مسعودعليا
- Village
- Location within Iran
- Coordinates: 35°45′38″N 48°51′01″E
- Country: Iran
- Province: Qazvin
- County: Avaj
- Bakhsh: Central
- Rural District: Hesar-e Valiyeasr

Population (2006)
  - Total: 149
- Time zone: UTC+3:30 (IRST)

Abdollah Masud-e Olya (Persian: عبداله مسعودعليا, also Romanized as ‘Abdollāh Mas‘ūd-e ‘Olyā) is a village in Hesar-e Valiyeasr Rural District, Central District, Avaj County, Qazvin Province, Iran. At the 2006 census, its population was 149, in 32 families.
