= Ardalan, Qazvin =

Village in Qazvin province, Iran

Ardalan Persian: اردلان
- Village
- Location within Iran
- Coordinates: 35°56′05″N 48°53′25″E
- Country: Iran
- Province: Qazvin
- County: Avaj
- District: Central
- Rural District: Hesar-e Valiyeasr

Population (2016)
  - Total: 2,375
- Time zone: UTC+3:30 (IRST)

Ardalan (Persian: اردلان) (Note: Also romanized as Ardalān and Ardelān; also known as Ardalānd) is a village in Hesar-e Valiyeasr Rural District of the Central District in Avaj County, Qazvin province, Iran.

== Demographics ==
=== Population ===
At the time of the 2006 National Census, the village's population was 2,189 in 524 households, when it was in the former Avaj District of Buin Zahra County. The following census in 2011 counted 2,456 people in 682 households. The 2016 census measured the population of the village as 2,375 people in 660 households, by which time the district had been separated from the county in the establishment of Avaj County. The rural district was transferred to the new Central District. It was the most populous village in its rural district.
