= Qerkh Bolagh, Qazvin =

Qerkh Bolagh قرخ بلاغ
- Village
- Location within Iran
- Coordinates: 35°46′32″N 49°18′24″E
- Country: Iran
- Province: Qazvin
- County: Avaj
- Bakhsh: Abgarm
- Rural District: Abgarm

Population (2006)
  - Total: 129
- Time zone: UTC+3:30 (IRST)
  - Summer (DST): UTC+4:30 (IRDT)

Qerkh Bolagh (Persian: قرخ بلاغ, also Romanized as Qerkh Bolāgh) is a village in Abgarm Rural District, Abgarm District, Avaj County, Qazvin Province, Iran. At the 2006 census, its population was 129, in 37 families.
