= Tizaj =

Tizaj (Persian: تيزج) may refer to:

- Tizaj, Hormozgan
- Tizaj, Qazvin
