= Shingel =

Village in Qazvin province, Iran

Shingel Persian: شينگل
- Village
- Location within Iran
- Coordinates: 35°40′53″N 49°21′56″E
- Country: Iran
- Province: Qazvin
- County: Avaj
- District: Abgarm
- Rural District: Kharaqan-e Sharqi

Population (2016)
  - Total: 385
- Time zone: UTC+3:30 (IRST)

Shingel (Persian: شينگل) (Note: Also romanized as Shīngel; also known as Shangel, Shangīl, and Shengīl) is a village in Kharaqan-e Sharqi Rural District of Abgarm District in Avaj County, Qazvin province, Iran.

== Demographics ==
=== Population ===
At the time of the 2006 National Census, the village's population was 319 in 97 households, when it was in Buin Zahra County. The following census in 2011 counted 328 people in 107 households. The 2016 census measured the population of the village as 385 people in 124 households, by which time the district had been separated from the county in the establishment of Avaj County.
