= Sagharan =

Sagharan or Saqaran or Saqeran (Persian: ساغران), also rendered as Saghari, may refer to:

- Sagharan-e Olya
- Sagharan-e Sofla
