= Nirej =

Village in Qazvin province, Iran

Nirej Persian: نيرج
- Village
- Location within Iran
- Coordinates: 35°40′17″N 49°04′55″E
- Country: Iran
- Province: Qazvin
- County: Avaj
- District: Central
- Rural District: Kharaqan-e Gharbi

Population (2016)
  - Total: 481
- Time zone: UTC+3:30 (IRST)

Nirej (Persian: نيرج) (Note: Also romanized as Nayrej, Nīārej, and Nīrej; also known as Neyarīj, Nīārīj, Nīrach, Nīrīj, and Tīzaj) is a village in, and the capital of, Kharaqan-e Gharbi Rural District in the Central District of Avaj County, Qazvin province, Iran.

== Demographics ==
=== Population ===
At the time of the 2006 National Census, the village's population was 151 in 43 households, when it was in the former Avaj District of Buin Zahra County. The following census in 2011 counted 788 people in 258 households. The 2016 census measured the population of the village as 481 people in 183 households, by which time the district had been separated from the county in the establishment of Avaj County. The rural district was transferred to the new Central District.
