= Kolanjin =

Village in Qazvin province, Iran

Kolanjin Persian: كلنجين
- Village
- Location within Iran
- Coordinates: 35°37′11″N 49°28′16″E
- Country: Iran
- Province: Qazvin
- County: Avaj
- District: Abgarm
- Rural District: Kharaqan-e Sharqi

Population (2016)
  - Total: 1,080
- Time zone: UTC+3:30 (IRST)

Kolanjin (Persian: كلنجين) (Note: Also romanized as Kalanjīn, Kolanjīn, and Kolenjīn; also known as Kolangīn and Qūlānjīn) is a village in, and the capital of, Kharaqan-e Sharqi Rural District in Abgarm District of Avaj County, Qazvin province, Iran.

== Demographics ==
=== Population ===
At the time of the 2006 National Census, the village's population was 979 in 263 households, when it was in Buin Zahra County. The following census in 2011 counted 1,205 people in 345 households. The 2016 census measured the population of the village as 1,080 people in 339 households, by which time the district had been separated from the county in the establishment of Avaj County. It was the most populous village in its rural district.
