= Qanqanlu, Qazvin =

Village in Qazvin province, Iran

Qanqanlu Persian: قانقانلو
- Village
- Location within Iran
- Coordinates: 35°44′51″N 48°46′09″E
- Country: Iran
- Province: Qazvin
- County: Avaj
- District: Central
- Rural District: Hesar-e Valiyeasr

Population (2016)
  - Total: 313
- Time zone: UTC+3:30 (IRST)

Qanqanlu (Persian: قانقانلو) (Note: Also romanized as Qānqānlū; also known as Ghanghanloo and Kānglū) is a village in Hesar-e Valiyeasr Rural District of the Central District in Avaj County, Qazvin province, Iran.

== Demographics ==
=== Population ===
At the time of the 2006 National Census, the village's population was 277 in 61 households, when it was in the former Avaj District of Buin Zahra County. The following census in 2011 counted 197 people in 61 households. The 2016 census measured the population of the village as 313 people in 105 households, by which time the district had been separated from the county in the establishment of Avaj County. The rural district was transferred to the new Central District.
