= Aruchan =

Village in Qazvin province, Iran

Aruchan Persian: اروچان
- Village
- Location within Iran
- Coordinates: 35°50′48″N 49°12′19″E
- Country: Iran
- Province: Qazvin
- County: Avaj
- District: Abgarm
- Rural District: Abgarm

Population (2016)
  - Total: 531
- Time zone: UTC+3:30 (IRST)

Aruchan (Persian: اروچان) (Note: Also romanized as Aroochan and Ārūchān; also known as Alūchān, Ārūjān, and Ūrchān) is a village in Abgarm Rural District of Abgarm District in Avaj County, Qazvin province, Iran.

== Demographics ==
=== Population ===
At the time of the 2006 National Census, the village's population was 654 in 155 households, when it was in Buin Zahra County. The following census in 2011 counted 527 people in 154 households. The 2016 census measured the population of the village as 531 people in 182 households, by which time the district had been separated from the county in the establishment of Avaj County. It was the most populous village in its rural district.
