= Abdollah Masud =

Abdollah Masud (Persian: عبداله مسعود) may refer to:

- Abdollah Masud-e Olya, a village in Hesar-e Valiyeasr Rural District, Central District, Avaj County, Qazvin Province, Iran
- Abdollah Masud-e Sofla, a village in Hesar-e Valiyeasr Rural District, Central District, Avaj County, Qazvin Province, Iran

== See also ==
- Abdullah ibn Masud
