= Chah Barf =

Chah Barf چاه برف
- Village
- Location within Iran
- Coordinates: 35°33′54″N 49°32′44″E
- Country: Iran
- Province: Qazvin
- County: Avaj
- Bakhsh: Abgarm
- Rural District: Kharaqan-e Sharqi

Population (2006)
  - Total: 105
- Time zone: UTC+3:30 (IRST)
  - Summer (DST): UTC+4:30 (IRDT)

Chah Barf (Persian: چاه برف, also Romanized as Chāh Barf; also known as Chāhbar) is a village in Kharaqan-e Sharqi Rural District, Abgarm District, Avaj County, Qazvin Province, Iran. At the 2006 census, its population was 105, in 26 families.
