= Qameshlu, Qazvin =

Village in Qazvin province, Iran

Qameshlu Persian: قمشلو
- Village
- Location within Iran
- Coordinates: 35°45′52″N 49°07′57″E
- Country: Iran
- Province: Qazvin
- County: Avaj
- District: Abgarm
- Rural District: Abgarm

Population (2016)
  - Total: 329
- Time zone: UTC+3:30 (IRST)

Qameshlu (Persian: قمشلو) (Note: Also romanized as Qameshlū; also known as Gamīshlū and Qamīshlū) is a village in Abgarm Rural District of Abgarm District in Avaj County, Qazvin province, Iran.

== Demographics ==
=== Population ===
At the time of the 2006 National Census, the village's population was 390 in 88 households, when it was in Buin Zahra County. The following census in 2011 counted 293 people in 87 households. The 2016 census measured the population of the village as 329 people in 99 households, by which time the district had been separated from the county in the establishment of Avaj County.
