= Milaq =

Milaq or Meylaq or Meyleq (Persian: ميلق or ميلاق) may refer to:

- Milaq, East Azerbaijan (ميلق - Mīlaq)
- Milaq, Qazvin (ميلاق - Mīlāq)
