= Chubineh =

Chubineh (Persian: چوبينه) may refer to:

- Chubineh, Kermanshah
- Chubineh, Qazvin
