= Parvan, Iran =

Village in Qazvin province, Iran

Parvan Persian: پروان
- Village
- Location within Iran
- Coordinates: 35°34′58″N 49°10′22″E
- Country: Iran
- Province: Qazvin
- County: Avaj
- District: Central
- Rural District: Shahidabad

Population (2016)
  - Total: 482
- Time zone: UTC+3:30 (IRST)

Parvan (Persian: پروان) (Note: Also romanized as Parvān and Parwān) is a village in Shahidabad Rural District of the Central District in Avaj County, Qazvin province, Iran.

== Demographics ==
=== Population ===
At the time of the 2006 National Census, the village's population was 253 in 64 households, when it was in the former Avaj District of Buin Zahra County. The following census in 2011 counted 277 people in 97 households. The 2016 census measured the population of the village as 482 people in 152 households, by which time the district had been separated from the county in the establishment of Avaj County. The rural district was transferred to the new Central District.
