= Shakhdar =

Village in Qazvin province, Iran

Shakhdar Persian: شاخدار
- Village
- Location within Iran
- Coordinates: 35°53′42″N 49°06′50″E
- Country: Iran
- Province: Qazvin
- County: Avaj
- District: Abgarm
- Rural District: Abgarm

Population (2016)
  - Total: 512
- Time zone: UTC+3:30 (IRST)

Shakhdar (Persian: شاخدار) (Note: Also romanized as Shākhdār) is a village in Abgarm Rural District of Abgarm District in Avaj County, Qazvin province, Iran.

== Demographics ==
=== Population ===
At the time of the 2006 National Census, the village's population was 636 in 157 households, when it was in Buin Zahra County. The following census in 2011 counted 474 people in 136 households. The 2016 census measured the population of the village as 512 people in 173 households, by which time the district had been separated from the county in the establishment of Avaj County.
