= Qerkh Bolagh =

Qerkh Bolagh or Qarakh Bolagh or Qarkh Bolagh (Persian: قرخ بلاغ), also rendered as Gharakh Bolagh, may refer to various places in Iran:

- Qarakh Bolagh, Kowsar, Ardabil Province
- Qerkh Bolagh, Meshgin Shahr, Ardabil Province
- Qarkh Bolagh, Charuymaq, East Azerbaijan Province
- Qerkh Bolagh, Sarab, East Azerbaijan Province
- Qerkh Bolagh, Hamadan
- Qerkh Bolagh, Qazvin
- Qerkh Bolagh, West Azerbaijan
