= Varuq =

Village in Qazvin province, Iran

Varuq Persian: وروق
- Village
- Location within Iran
- Coordinates: 35°32′21″N 49°22′40″E
- Country: Iran
- Province: Qazvin
- County: Avaj
- District: Central
- Rural District: Shahidabad

Population (2016)
  - Total: 362
- Time zone: UTC+3:30 (IRST)

Varuq (Persian: وروق) (Note: Also romanized as Ūrūq, Varūq, Vorūq, and Warūq; also known as Varagh and Varaq) is a village in Shahidabad Rural District of the Central District in Avaj County, Qazvin province, Iran.

== Demographics ==
=== Population ===
At the time of the 2006 National Census, the village's population was 410 in 94 households, when it was in the former Avaj District of Buin Zahra County. The following census in 2011 counted 383 people in 107 households. The 2016 census measured the population of the village as 362 people in 112 households, by which time the district had been separated from the county in the establishment of Avaj County. The rural district was transferred to the new Central District.
