= Yasti Bolagh =

Village in Qazvin province, Iran

Yasti Bolagh Persian: ياستي بلاغ
- Village
- Location within Iran
- Coordinates: 35°41′21″N 49°19′01″E
- Country: Iran
- Province: Qazvin
- County: Avaj
- District: Abgarm
- Rural District: Abgarm

Population (2016)
  - Total: 361
- Time zone: UTC+3:30 (IRST)

Yasti Bolagh (Persian: ياستي بلاغ) (Note: Also romanized as Yāstī Bolāgh; also known as Yasta Bulāgh) is a village in Abgarm Rural District of Abgarm District in Avaj County, Qazvin province, Iran.

== Demographics ==
=== Population ===
At the time of the 2006 National Census, the village's population was 223 in 72 households, when it was in Buin Zahra County. The following census in 2011 counted 290 people in 95 households. The 2016 census measured the population of the village as 361 people in 120 households, by which time the district had been separated from the county in the establishment of Avaj County.
