= Sagharan-e Sofla =

Sagharan-e Sofla ساغران سفلي
- Village
- Location within Iran
- Coordinates: 35°44′03″N 49°21′02″E
- Country: Iran
- Province: Qazvin
- County: Avaj
- Bakhsh: Abgarm
- Rural District: Abgarm

Population (2006)
  - Total: 212
- Time zone: UTC+3:30 (IRST)
  - Summer (DST): UTC+4:30 (IRDT)

Sagharan-e Sofla (Persian: ساغران سفلي, also Romanized as Sāgharān-e Soflá and Sāqerān-e Soflá; also known as Meykand, Sāgharī-ye Soflá, Yangī Kand, and Yaqī Kand) is a village in Abgarm Rural District, Abgarm District, Avaj County, Qazvin Province, Iran. At the 2006 census, its population was 212, in 54 families.
