= Najafabad, Avaj =

Village in Qazvin province, Iran

Najafabad Persian: نجف اباد
- Village
- Location within Iran
- Coordinates: 35°43′13″N 49°15′21″E
- Country: Iran
- Province: Qazvin
- County: Avaj
- District: Abgarm
- Rural District: Abgarm

Population (2016)
  - Total: 331
- Time zone: UTC+3:30 (IRST)

Najafabad (Persian: نجف اباد) (Note: Also romanized as Najafābād; also known as Najaf Abad Kharaghan Gharbi) is a village in Abgarm Rural District of Abgarm District in Avaj County, Qazvin province, Iran.

== Demographics ==
=== Population ===
At the time of the 2006 National Census, the village's population was 263 in 76 households, when it was in Buin Zahra County. The following census in 2011 counted 299 people in 104 households. The 2016 census measured the population of the village as 331 people in 105 households, by which time the district had been separated from the county in the establishment of Avaj County.
