= Qanqanlu =

Qanqanlu (Persian: قانقانلو) may refer to:

- Qanqanlu, Hamadan
- Qanqanlu, Qazvin
