= Sabzak =

Village in Qazvin province, Iran

Sabzak Persian: سبزك
- Village
- Location within Iran
- Coordinates: 35°37′05″N 49°30′38″E
- Country: Iran
- Province: Qazvin
- County: Avaj
- District: Abgarm
- Rural District: Kharaqan-e Sharqi

Population (2016)
  - Total: 325
- Time zone: UTC+3:30 (IRST)

Sabzak (Persian: سبزك) (Note: Also romanized as Sabzok; also known as Īshak Chūpān and Sabzeh) is a village in Kharaqan-e Sharqi Rural District of Abgarm District in Avaj County, Qazvin province, Iran.

== Demographics ==
=== Population ===
At the time of the 2006 National Census, the village's population was 239 in 62 households, when it was in Buin Zahra County. The following census in 2011 counted 216 people in 78 households. The 2016 census measured the population of the village as 325 people in 114 households, by which time the district had been separated from the county in the establishment of Avaj County.
