= Mesrabad =

Mesrabad (Persian: مصراباد), also rendered as Misrabad, may refer to:

- Mesrabad, Qazvin
- Mesrabad, Zanjan
