= Sir Ab, Qazvin =

Village in Qazvin province, Iran

Sir Ab Persian: سيراب
- Village
- Location within Iran
- Coordinates: 35°41′09″N 49°24′07″E
- Country: Iran
- Province: Qazvin
- County: Avaj
- District: Abgarm
- Rural District: Kharaqan-e Sharqi

Population (2016)
  - Total: 304
- Time zone: UTC+3:30 (IRST)

Sir Ab (Persian: سيراب) (Note: Also romanized as Sīr Āb) is a village in Kharaqan-e Sharqi Rural District of Abgarm District in Avaj County, Qazvin province, Iran.

== Demographics ==
=== Population ===
At the time of the 2006 National Census, the village's population was 260 in 68 households, at which timeit was administratively part of Buin Zahra County. The following census in 2011 counted 270 people in 95 households. The 2016 census recorded a population of 304 people in 104 households, by which time the district had been separated from the county in the establishment of Avaj County.
