= Sagharan-e Olya =

Village in Qazvin province, Iran

Sagharan-e Olya Persian: ساغران عليا
- Village
- Location within Iran
- Coordinates: 35°42′41″N 49°21′51″E
- Country: Iran
- Province: Qazvin
- County: Avaj
- District: Abgarm
- Rural District: Abgarm

Population (2016)
  - Total: 321
- Time zone: UTC+3:30 (IRST)

Sagharan-e Olya (Persian: ساغران عليا) (Note: Also romanized as Sagharan Olya and Sāgharān-e ‘Olyā; also known as Sāgharān-e Bālā, Sāgharī-ye ‘Olyā, Sāqarān, Sāqarān-e Bālā, Sāqarān-e ‘Olyā, Sāqerān-e Bālā, and Saran) is a village in Abgarm Rural District of Abgarm District in Avaj County, Qazvin province, Iran.

== Demographics ==
=== Population ===
At the time of the 2006 National Census, the village's population was 367 in 99 households, when it was in Buin Zahra County. The following census in 2011 counted 373 people in 112 households. The 2016 census measured the population of the village as 321 people in 110 households, by which time the district had been separated from the county in the establishment of Avaj County.
