= Chahbar (disambiguation) =

Chahbar or Chah Bahar is a city in Sistan and Balochistan Province of Iran.

Chahbar (Persian: چاهبار) may also refer to:

- Chah Bar, Markazi, Iran
- Chahbar, Qazvin, Iran
