= Asyan =

Village in Qazvin province, Iran

Asyan Persian: اسيان
- Village
- Location within Iran
- Coordinates: 35°43′34″N 49°16′59″E
- Country: Iran
- Province: Qazvin
- County: Avaj
- District: Abgarm
- Rural District: Abgarm

Population (2016)
  - Total: 379
- Time zone: UTC+3:30 (IRST)

Asyan (Persian: اسيان) (Note: Also romanized as Āsīān, Asīyan, and Āsyān) is a village in Abgarm Rural District of Abgarm District in Avaj County, Qazvin province, Iran.

== Demographics ==
=== Population ===
At the time of the 2006 National Census, the village's population was 290 in 81 households, when it was in Buin Zahra County. The following census in 2011 counted 310 people in 101 households. The 2016 census measured the population of the village as 379 people in 112 households, by which time the district had been separated from the county in the establishment of Avaj County.
