= Asiyan =

Asiyan may refer to:

- Aşiyan, a neighborhood of Istanbul
- Asyan, a village in Iran
