= Uruq =

Uruq may refer to:

- Uruk, in Sumeria
- `Uruq, in Yemen
- Al `Uruq, in Yemen
- Varuq, in Iran
