= Ahmadabad, Qazvin =

Ahmadabad (Persian: احمد آباد) in Qazvin Province may refer to:

- Ahmadabad, Abgarm
- Ahmadabad, Dashtabi
- Ahmadabad, Takestan
