= Ardelan =

Ardelan may refer to:

- Mark Ardelan (born 1983), Canadian ice hockey player
- Ardalan, Qazvin, village in Iran
