= Parvan =

Parvan may refer to:

- Vasile Pârvan, Romanian historian and archaeologist
- Parvān Province, Afghanistan
- Parvan, Iran, a village in Qazvin Province
- Parvan, Targovishte Province, a village in Targovishte Province, Bulgaria
