= Emamzadeh, Qazvin =

Emamzadeh امام زاده
- Village
- Location within Iran
- Coordinates: 35°36′09″N 49°21′00″E
- Country: Iran
- Province: Qazvin
- County: Avaj
- Bakhsh: Abgarm
- Rural District: Kharaqan-e Sharqi

Population (2006)
  - Total: 52
- Time zone: UTC+3:30 (IRST)
  - Summer (DST): UTC+4:30 (IRDT)

Emamzadeh (Persian: امام زاده, also Romanized as Emāmzādeh; also known as Emāmzādeh Qāsem) is a village in Kharaqan-e Sharqi Rural District, Abgarm District, Avaj County, Qazvin Province, Iran. At the 2006 census, its population was 52, in 11 families.
