= Art of the Seljuks of Iran =

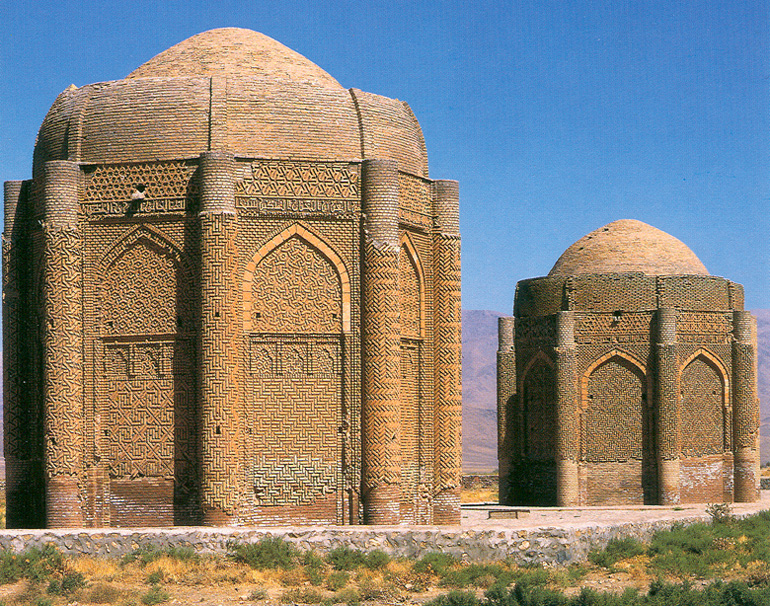
The Kharraqan towers, Qazvin Province, 1067, Iran

The art of the Seljuks of Iran refers to the art produced throughout the eastern part of the Islamic world, between the capture of Baghdad (1055) and the Mongol invasions (end of the 13th century).

Nomads of Turkish origin (that is to say from present-day Mongolia), the Seljuks swept over the Islamic world towards the end of the 10th century from eastern Iran (Transoxiana and Khwarezm). They gradually established power by playing on the enmities between the different micro-dynasties of the region and seized Baghdad in 1048, effectively ending Abbasid rule, although they retained a caliph-puppet on the throne of Baghdad. The Seljuks, like their predecessors, saw their power decrease over time, and many small dynasties were born in the most remote areas. The end of the Seljuk period in Iran is estimated at 1194, although the production of eponymous objects dates from the end of the 12th and the beginning of the 13th century, and was therefore made for independent, smaller rulers.

== Architecture ==
=== Religious architecture ===
It was under the Seljuks that the so-called “Iranian” plan appeared for the first time, perhaps in the redesign of the Great Mosque of Isfahan. The Iranian plan has four iwans arranged in a cruciform manner around a courtyard, as well as a domed room serving as a prayer room.In the Great Mosque of Isfahan, as it appeared at the time, it seems (according to the work of Galdieri) that this room was detached from the rest of the mosque by an open corridor which separated it from the ancient Hypostyle prayer hall.

=== Funerary architecture ===
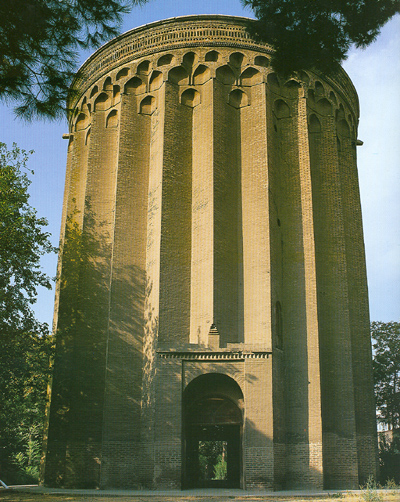
Funerary tower of Seljuk Tughril Bey in Rey (12th century).

Another important monument of this period is the mausoleum of Sanjar in Merv (now Turkmenistan), which dates from around 1152. Built in brick, as is traditional in Iran, it is one of the most impressive funerary monuments known. It is composed of two parts: a high square base, open to arcades in the upper part, and a circular drum supporting a double dome (hemispherical on the inside, and probably pointed on the outside).

== Objects ==
As for the objects, as we have already pointed out, those called "Seljuks" are in fact of the later period.

=== Ceramic ===
Ceramics of this period benefited from a considerable advance: the invention of siliceous paste. This is a new type of paste, which contains less clay than that used previously, but more quartz. The material is much more difficult to work because of its hardness, but also whiter and finer.

==== White ceramics ====
The decoration of these pieces can first play on the intrinsic quality of the object, by highlighting its transparency, its whiteness by applying a colorless glaze and drilling small holes (decorations in "grain of rice") or the engraving of inscriptions in the dough. The siliceous paste makes it possible to obtain very thin walls, some close to transparency, with a white color. The decoration could be incised, engraved or molded.

Animated representations are rare on this type of ceramic.

This type of production is carried out in cities like Kashan and Gorgan. Some also can be found in Afghanistan. The production of these ceramics was continued after the Mongol invasion; artists fled to Syria and Anatolia where this type of production is found until the middle of the 13th century.

== Samples of the work ==
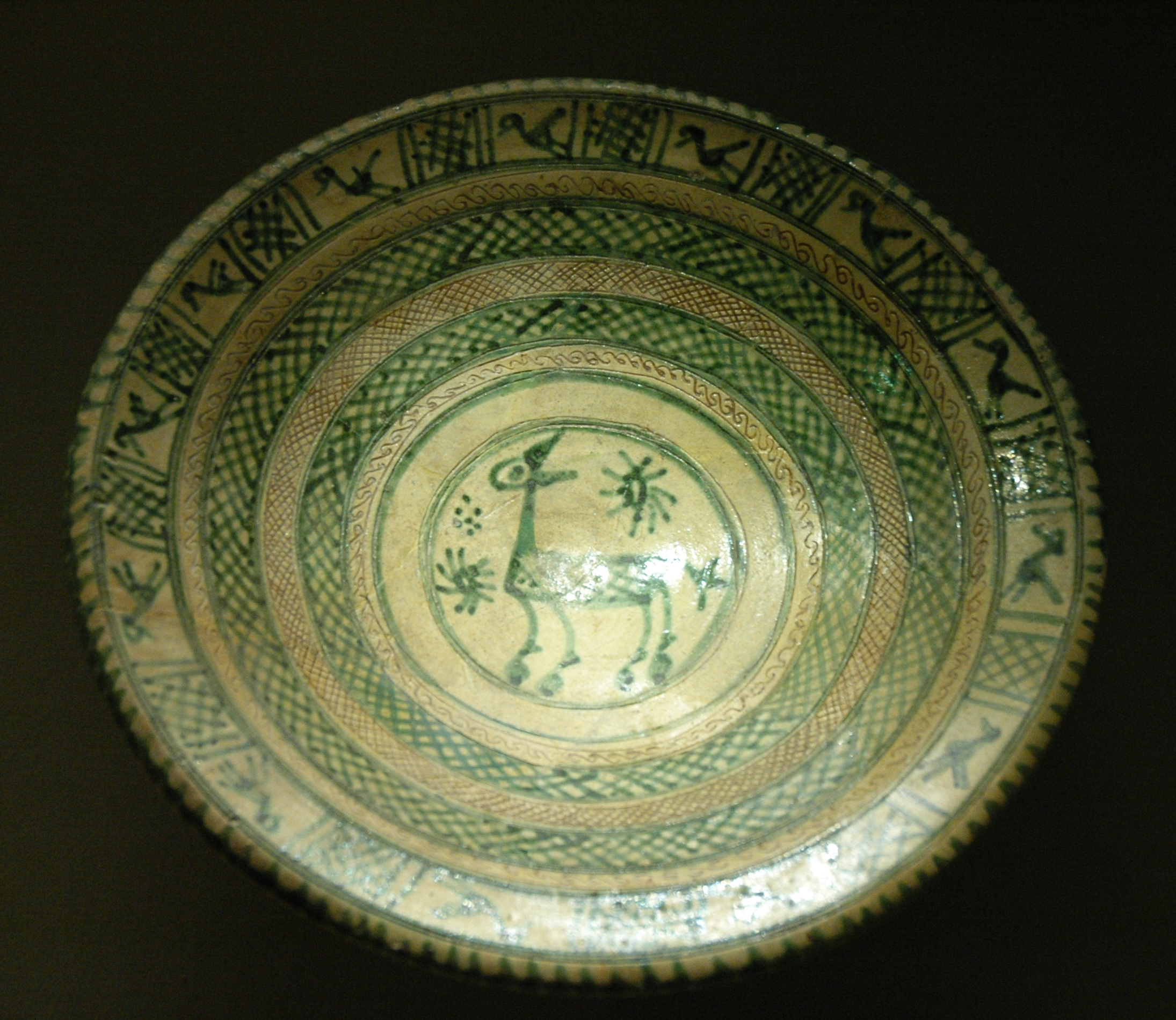
Cup with donkey, 12th - 13th century, Musée du Louvre.

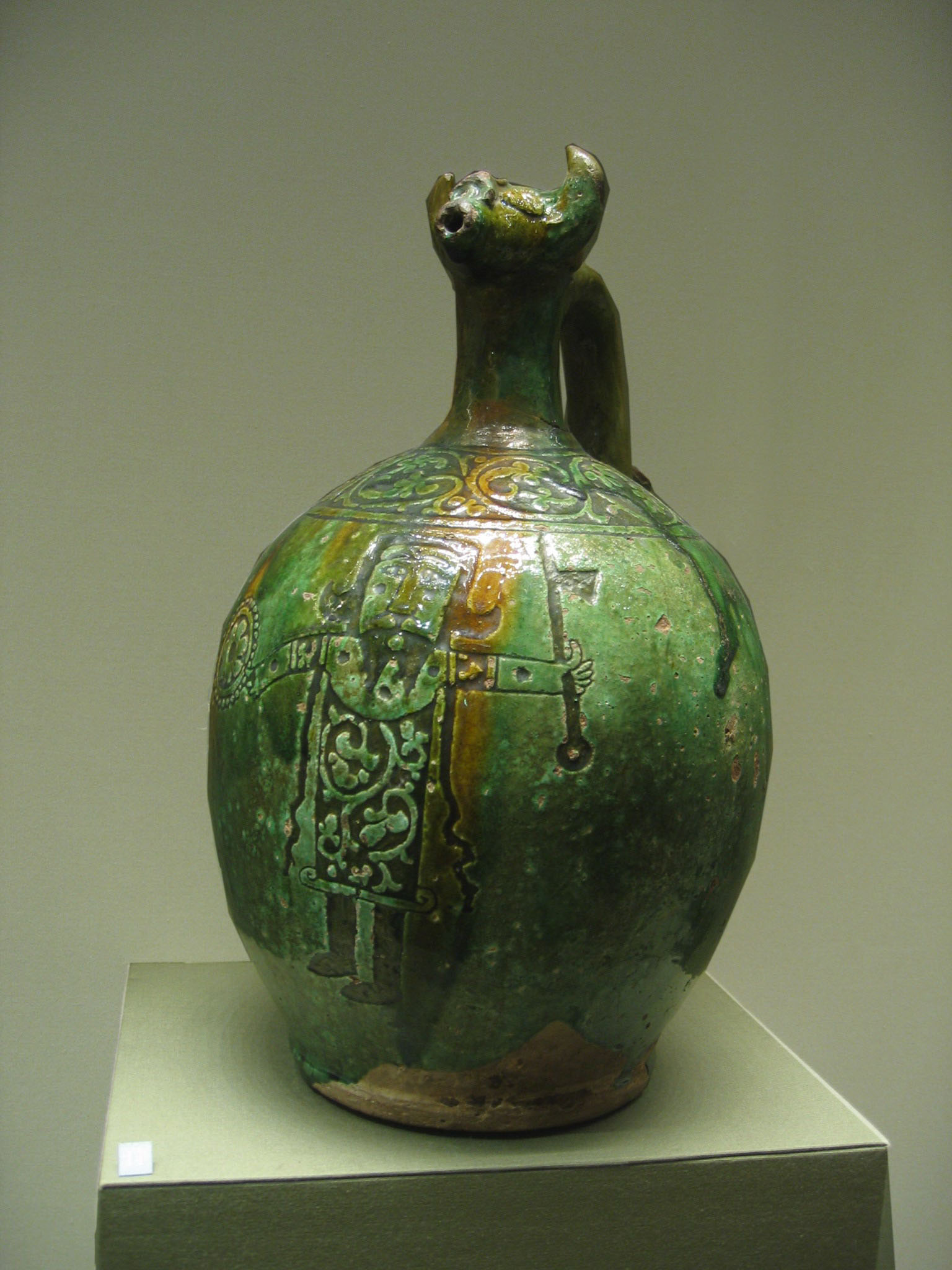
Ewer with animal head, 12th - 13th century, Musée du Louvre.

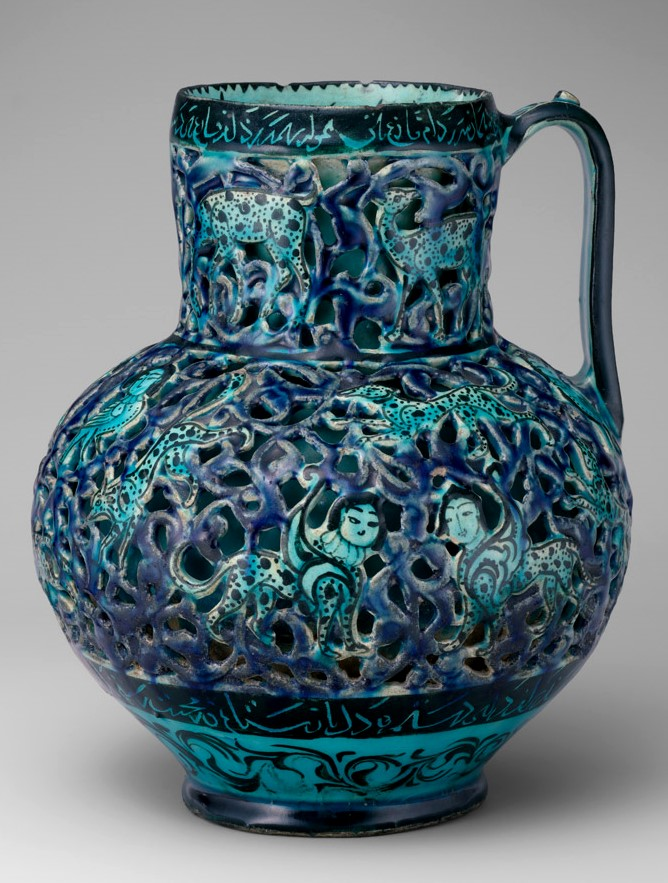
Reticulated jug, 1215, Metropolitan Museum of Art
