= Kharaqan-e Gharbi Rural District =

Rural district in Qazvin province, Iran

Kharaqan-e Gharbi Rural District Persian: دهستان خرقان غربی
- Rural District
- Location within Iran
- Coordinates: 35°41′N 49°05′E
- Country: Iran
- Province: Qazvin
- County: Avaj
- District: Central
- Established: 1987
- Capital: Nirej

Population (2016)
  - Total: 2,699
- Time zone: UTC+3:30 (IRST)

Kharaqan-e Gharbi Rural District (Persian: دهستان خرقان غربی) is in the Central District of Avaj County, Qazvin province, Iran. Its capital is the village of Nirej.

== Demographics ==
=== Population ===
At the time of the 2006 National Census, the rural district's population (as a part of the former Avaj District of Buin Zahra County) was 2,081 in 575 households. There were 3,076 inhabitants in 1,015 households at the following census of 2011. The 2016 census measured the population of the rural district as 2,699 in 933 households, by which time the district had been separated from the county in the establishment of Avaj County. The rural district was transferred to the new Central District. The most populous of its 10 villages was Mansur, with 571 people.

=== Other villages in the rural district ===
- Arvan
- Asadabad
- Bi Ab
- Emamzadeh Ala ol Din
- Naqqash
- Quzlu
- Shur Ab
