= Kharraqan Towers =

11th-century twinned domes in Iran

- برج‌های خرقان
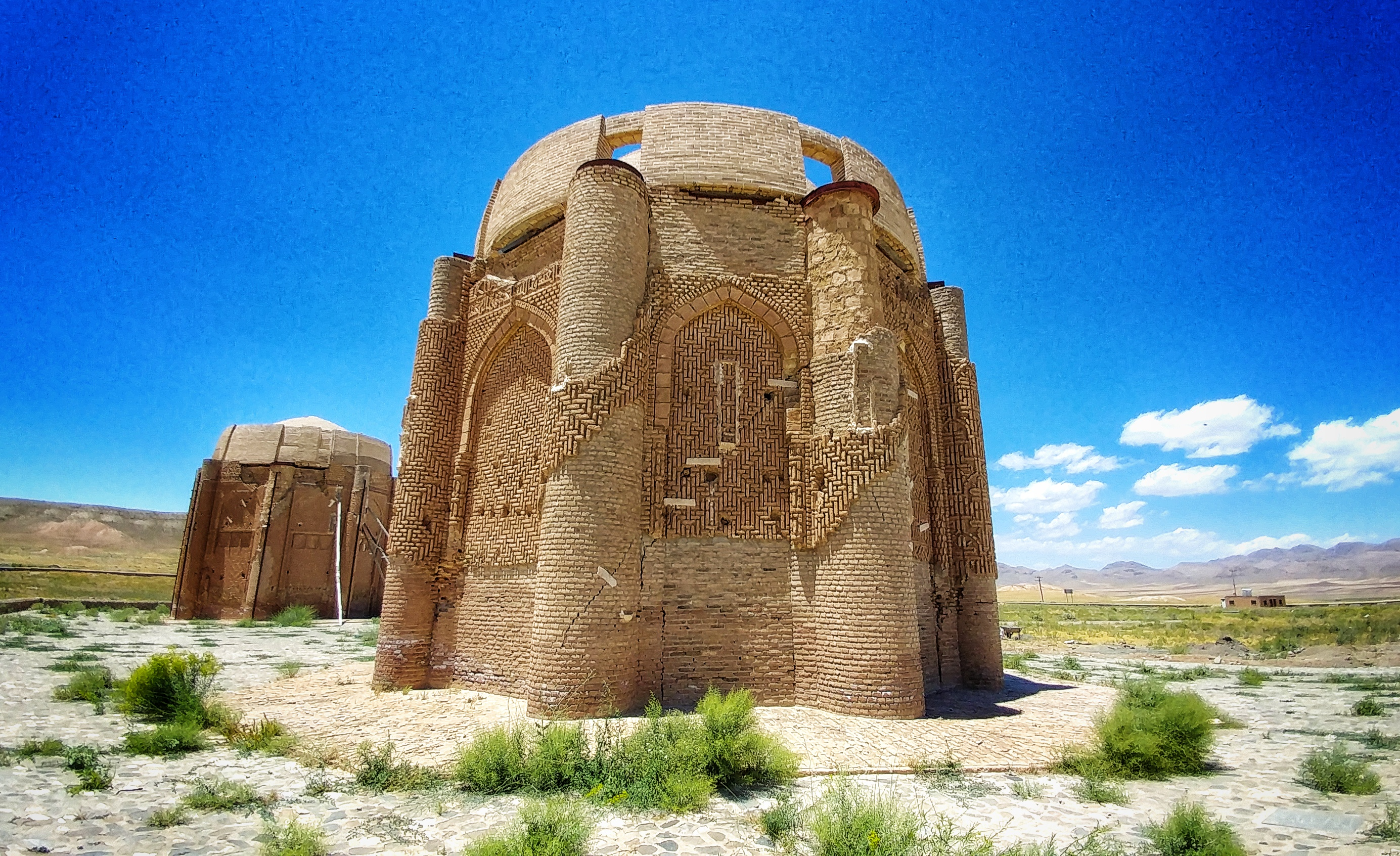
- The Kharāghān twin towers

- Location of the mausoleum in Iran

Religion
- Affiliation: Islam
- Ecclesiastical or organizational status: Mausoleum
- Status: Active

Location
- Location: Hesar-e Valiyeasr, Qazvin province, Iran
- Interactive map of Kharraqan Towers
- Coordinates: 35°50′24.5″N 49°00′32.2″E

Architecture
- Architect: Muhammad bin Makki al-Zanjani
- Type: Islamic architecture
- Style: Seljuk
- Completed: 1067 CE (1st tower); 1093 CE (2nd tower)

Specifications
- Width: 4 m (13 ft)
- Height (max): 13 m (43 ft)
- Materials: Bricks

The Kharraqan Towers (Persian: برج‌های خرقان, romanized: Borj ha-ye Kharraqan), also known as the Kharrakhan or the Domes of Kharaghan, are a pair of mausolea built in 1067 and 1093 CE, in the Kharraqan region, in Hesar-e Valiyeasr, near Qazvin, Qazvin province, northern Iran. They are notable for being an early example of a geometric ornament, an early example of double domes, and one of the earlier tomb towers that appeared in the Seljuk era during the 11th century.

The octagonal brick structures stand 13 metres (43 ft) tall, and each side is 4 metres (13 ft) wide. The surface of both mausolea demonstrate extensive use of geometry. The interior walls of the older mausoleum are decorated with paintings of various subjects. The eastern tower dates from 1067–68, and the western tower dates from 1093.

== Descriptions ==
=== Structure ===
Both mausolea have double shells for the domes; the inner shells are intact, but the outer shells on both towers are lost. There is no direct access to light through the windows on the outer and inner shells of the dome. However, the opposite positions of the window on the two shells allow indirect light into the first tower through the side window on the inner shell.

Each octagonal tower has eight rounded buttresses - one per corner. Stronach and Young speculate there were vertical ribs for the demolished outer shell of the dome; however, they conclude from the lack of same ribs in the inner side that the ridges, accompanying the ribs, were decorative.

=== Exterior ===
Both towers have inscriptions of their architect on the exterior surface. Muhammad b. Makki al-Zanjani is inscribed on the earlier tower; Abu’l-Ma’ali b. Makki al-Zanjani, on the later tower. Stronach and Young indicate the two names refer to the same person—a local, unknown architect.

Also on the exterior of the buildings is an intricate geometric patterning formed of carved bricks. The brick also features lengthy inscriptions, both historical and Quranic. The historical inscription on the eastern tower includes not only the architect, but also another name, possibly the mausoleum's intended patron, which can only be partially read due to damage.

The Kufic inscription of Quranic text on the exterior walls of both towers, identically distributed across sides and buttresses, features Sura 59, verses 21-23, recognizable despite damage on buttresses. Samuel Stern asserts that these Suras are an unusual choice for mausolea, but points to the preceding verses as being more fitting. Parts of the inscriptions above the western tower's door can be recognized as Sura 23, Verse 115.

=== Interior ===
The eastern tower's interior appears to have been fully decorated with frescoes, but only a few survive. There are paintings of mosque lamps in the niches, of pomegranate trees and peacocks in the piers alternating between them, and of a medallion surrounding peacocks and geometrical ornament near the top of the niches. There is also a band of Kufic calligraphy just below the beginning of the dome.

The western tower's interior contains no plaster decoration; instead, there are a mihrab and additional brick ornament.

It is believed that the occupant of the eastern tower was Abu Sa'id Bijar and the occupant of the western tower was Abu Mansur Iltayti, according to Dr. Samuel Miklós Stern's transliteration of the inscriptions on the towers.

== Interpretations ==
The Kharraqan Towers exhibit more elaborate external design, individualized for each of the eight sides, in comparison to other towers with more repetitive patterns. Oleg Grabar reminds that there is no concrete method of elucidating the meaning of the abstract, geometric decoration in Islamic architecture. Instead, the intricacy of the geometric pattern promotes appreciation of the visual design itself.

The subjects of wall paintings inside the western tower possess symbolic association with heaven. Abbas Daneshvari connects the light of the lamp with the light of the god, thus with paradise. Daneshvari further associates the interior paintings with paradise by emphasizing the iconographic role of peacocks, in sunburst medallions, as the bird of paradise. Peacocks appear in the Islamic medieval culture of Iran in literature and art objects such as textiles and ceramic wares.

== 21st century ==
Both towers were significantly damaged by the 2002 Bou'in-Zahra earthquake. They were in a good state of preservation before the event, suggesting it was one of the most powerful quakes in the region for approximately 900 years.

== See also ==
- Iranian architecture
- Islam in Iran
- Persian domes
