= Twin towers (architecture) =

Paired or co-joined buildings in construction

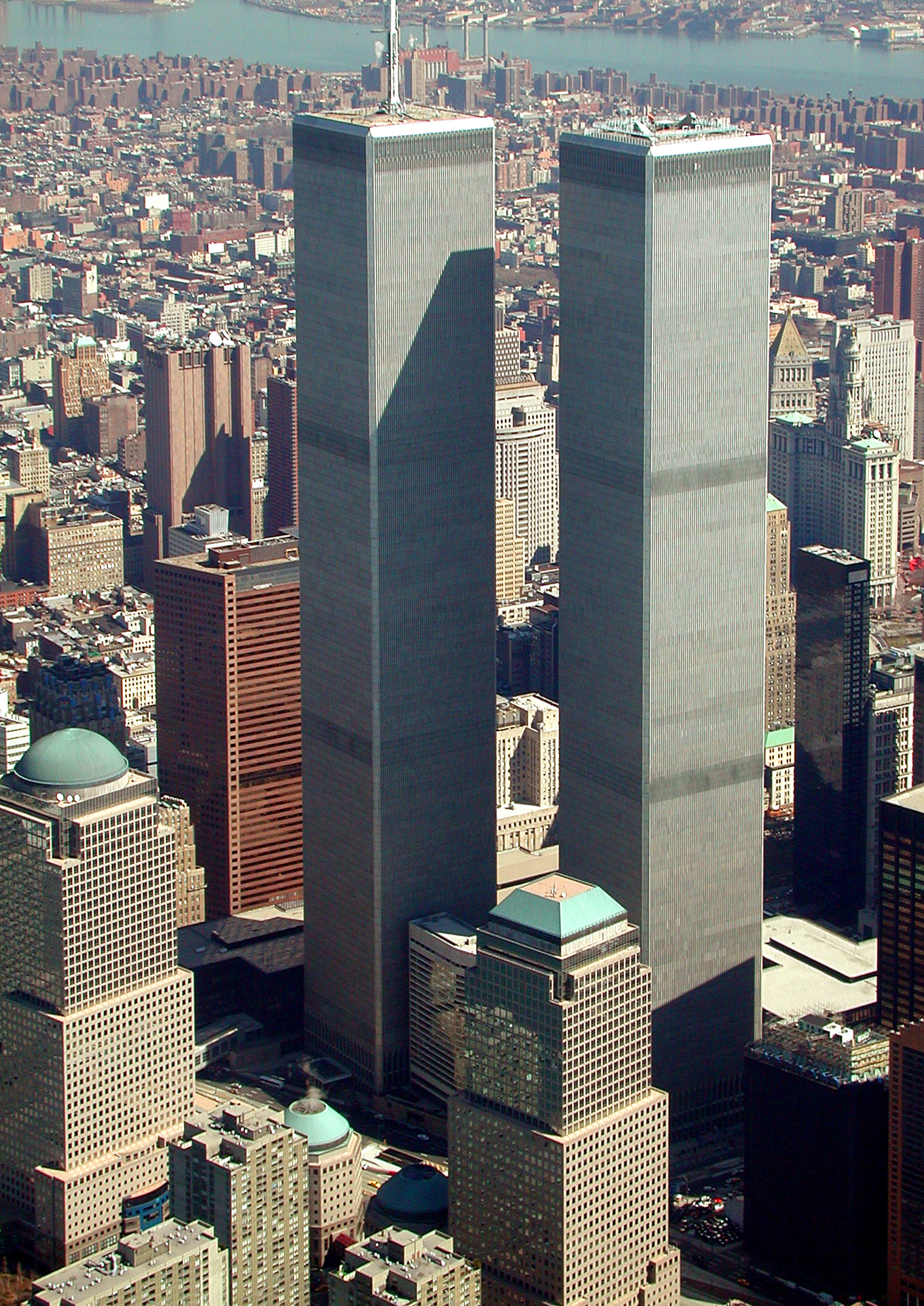
The Twin Towers of the original World Trade Center were prominent landmarks of New York City and were destroyed in the September 11 attacks.

Twin towers are a concept in architecture where two similar looking towers are built in close proximity to each other. They have been an architectural motif in human civilization for millennia.

Early examples include the use of twin gate towers in urban and palatial architecture in Chinese cities from the Warring States period, when they were viewed as "signifiers of the celestial realm". In the medieval period, examples include the Seljuk Kharraqan towers, twin towers wrought in decorative brickwork that represent a prominent work in the art and architecture of Islamic Iran. In medieval fortification, the use of twin towers was common in gatehouses, to provide flanking fire defending the gate. This was also a feature of Roman fortification.

In the contemporary era, the Petronas Twin Towers in Kuala Lumpur, Malaysia are a particularly celebrated example of twin tower architecture that, from 1998 to 2003, were the tallest structure in the world. The Twin Towers (1 and 2 World Trade Center, or the North Tower and South Tower respectively) were prominent landmarks of the original World Trade Center complex in New York City. They were completed in 1973 and dominated the Lower Manhattan skyline for almost 30 years. The towers were damaged in the 1993 World Trade Center bombing and were completely destroyed during the September 11, 2001 attacks eight years later. Skyscrapers formed of connected twin towers have been used in Chinese construction, for example at the CCTV Headquarters, although they are uncommon.

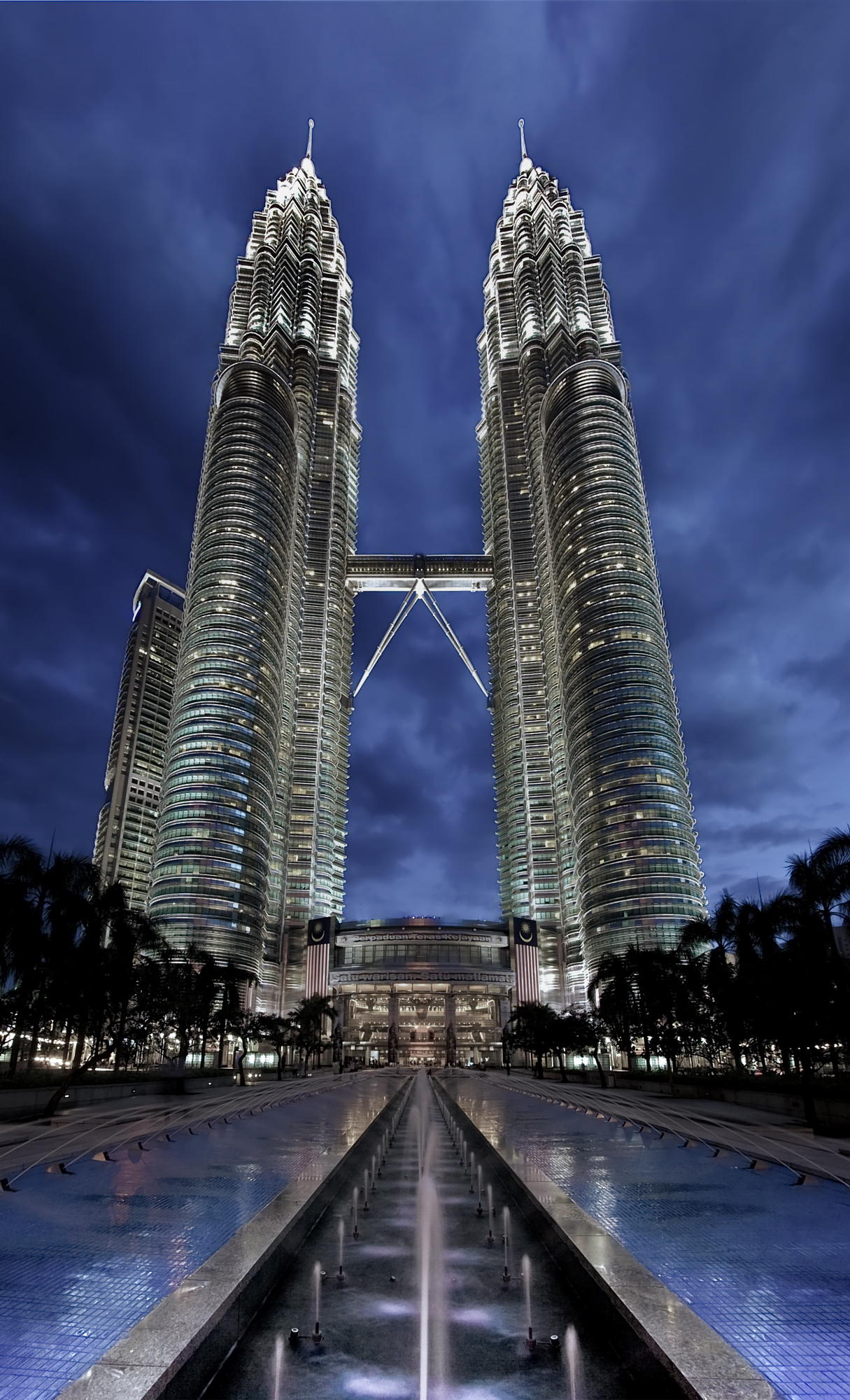
The Petronas Twin Towers in Kuala Lumpur

In contemporary architecture, structurally connected twin towers with unequal heights have found particular favor among architects for their earthquake-resistant properties, due to such couplings yielding two differing vibration frequencies, enabling the twinned towers to support their counterparts at their more vulnerable frequencies.

== See Also ==
- List of tallest twin buildings and structures
