= Abgarm =

City in Qazvin province, Iran

Abgarm Persian: آبگرم
- City
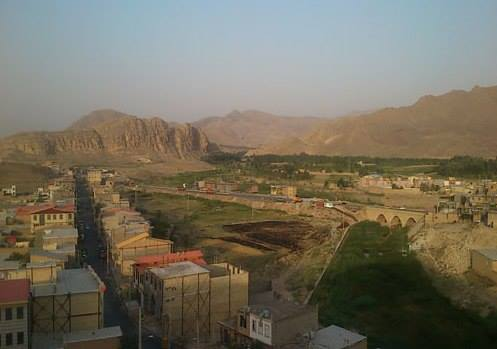

- Location within Iran
- Coordinates: 35°45′24″N 49°17′06″E
- Country: Iran
- Province: Qazvin
- County: Avaj
- District: Abgarm
- Established as a city: 2001

Population (2016)
  - Total: 6,336
- Time zone: UTC+3:30 (IRST)

Abgarm (Persian: آبگرم) (Note: Also romanized as Āb Garm, Āb-e Garm, Abegarm, and Ābgarm) is a city in, and the capital of, Abgarm District of Avaj County, Qazvin province, Iran. It also serves as the administrative center for Abgarm Rural District. The village of Abgarm was converted to a city in 2001 and lies along Road 37, about 20 kilometers north by road from Avaj.

== Demographics ==
=== Population ===
At the time of the 2006 National Census, the city's population was 5,191 in 1,345 households, when it was in Buin Zahra County. The following census in 2011 counted 5,998 people in 1,696 households. The 2016 census measured the population of the city as 6,336 people in 1,903 households, by which time the district had been separated from the county in the establishment of Avaj County.
