= 2002 Bou'in-Zahra earthquake =

2002 earthquake in Iran

2002 Bou'in–Zahra earthquake
- Location within Iran
- UTC time: 2002-06-22 02:58:21
- ISC event: 3187856
- USGS-ANSS: ComCat
- Local date: 22 June 2002
- Local time: 7:28 a.m. IST
- Duration: 7 seconds
- Magnitude: M_{wc} 6.5
- Depth: 10 km (6.2 mi)
- Epicenter: 35.62°N 49.04°E
- Type: Thrust
- Areas affected: Iran
- Max. intensity: MMI VIII (Severe)
- Landslides: 59
- Aftershocks: more than 20
- Casualties: at least 261 dead, 1,500 injured, and 50,000 homeless

An earthquake occurred on 22 June 2002 with the epicenter near the city (Note: Bou'in-Zahra is a county, and a city of the same name.) of Bou'in-Zahra (Note: The name of this city and county has sometimes been transliterated as Bouynzahra, Buin-Zahra, and Buyin Zahra.) in Iran's Qazvin province. The region is crossed by several major faults and known for destructive earthquakes. The shock measured 6.5 on the M_{wc} scale, had a maximum Mercalli intensity of VIII (Severe), and was followed by more than 20 aftershocks. At least 261 people were killed and 1,500 more were injured.

According to the International Institute of Earthquake Engineering and Seismology (IIEES), the earthquake was felt as far away as the capital city of Tehran, approximately 290 kilometres (180 mi) east of the epicenter, although no damage was reported there. Most houses in the region were single-story masonry buildings, and virtually all of these collapsed. Public anger arose due to the slow official response to victims who needed supplies. Residents of the town of Avaj resorted to throwing stones at the car of a government minister.

== Background and tectonics ==
The northeastern part of Iran lies across part of the belt of active continental collision between the Arabian plate and the Eurasian plate. Iran is crossed by several major faults, with 90% of them being seismically active and subject to many earthquakes each year; the area around the rupture experiences minor quakes almost daily. The most seismically active parts of this area are the Zagros fold and thrust belt and the Alborz mountain range. Qazvin province, which is located between these two zones, suffers fewer earthquakes, but these may be more powerful because stresses have longer to build.

The Bou'in-Zahra earthquake was located in an area of active thrust faulting and folding, parallel and south of the southern edge of the Alborz mountain range, and was the 11th rupture in the previous two months in central Iran. A seismic inversion of long-period P and SH body-wave seismograms indicated a rupture on a thrust fault that dips 49 degrees to the southwest and had a centroid depth of roughly 10 kilometres (6 mi). The rupture's mechanism of faulting was reverse.

Multiple-event relocation of the main shock and aftershock epicenters and discontinuous surface ruptures recorded after the earthquake are compatible with northeastward movement on a southwest-dipping thrust, although maximum recorded displacements were less than would have been expected from the observed magnitude. This suggests that most of the slip did not actually reach the Earth's surface but caused folding at the surface. A previously unmapped thrust with little surface expression, the Abdareh fault, has been identified from the disruption of earlier drainage systems by the growth of the fold in its hanging wall, and is thought to be responsible for the earthquake. Such structures are known as blind thrusts, and have been responsible for many destructive earthquakes in Iran and elsewhere. The geomorphological effects of this particular fold have been partly obscured by the presence of an earlier Neogene topography. The Qazvin region was hit by an even greater earthquake in 1962, which killed 12,200. In 1990 a rupture killed over 40,000 people, injured 60,000, and left more than 500,000 homeless.

== Damage and casualties ==
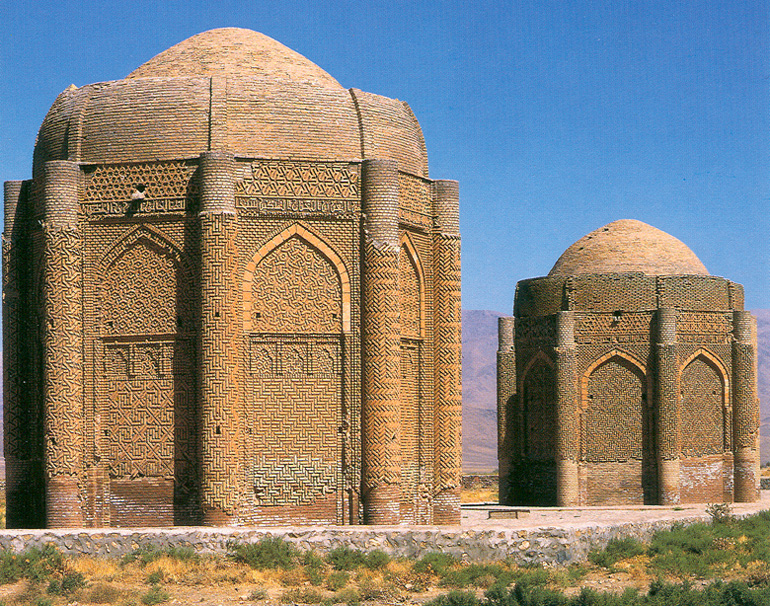
The Kharāghān twin towers before the earthquake

The earthquake occurred at 02:58 UTC (7:28 a.m. Iran Standard Time), while many of the estimated 60 million Iranians affected were in their homes. Its duration was seven seconds, and the epicenter was near the settlement of Bou'in-Zahra in the Khar river valley, a mountainous farming region about 60 kilometres (37 mi) from the provincial capital of Qazvin. The greatest damage was across an area best known for its seedless grape harvesting, a getaway for wealthy residents of Tehran. At least 261 people were killed, 1,500 injured, and 25,000 left homeless. An earlier death toll was reported as 500, but this number was believed to be inflated once it became known that some of the severely injured had been mistaken for dead. Most of the dead were women, children and the elderly, as many of the men were working in local vineyards. Over 20 aftershocks were recorded, with magnitudes up to 5.1 on the moment magnitude scale. At least three of these caused further casualties and damage, most of which were within a 25 kilometres (16 mi) radius of the main shock.

An estimated 5,000 buildings were damaged beyond repair. In the Qazvin province, 120 buildings were demolished and 50 villages suffered massive damage. In the neighboring Hamadan province, 45 villages were destroyed. A large majority of houses in the region were single-story masonry buildings, and virtually all of these collapsed. As non-engineered structures, these could not withstand seismic forces, with structural failure and collapse resulting from wall-to-wall separation and the lack of structural integrity and of a proper lateral system of resisting. Newer structures built in accordance with the Iranian code of practice for seismic-resistant design fared much better. Damage to the historic Kharaqan tomb towers, which were in a good state of preservation before the event, suggests that the earthquake was possibly one of the most powerful in the region for approximately 900 years.

At a station 28 kilometres (17 mi) from the epicenter, the maximum horizontal and vertical accelerations were recorded to be roughly 0.5 g and 0.26 g. A bridge collapsed as a result of the disaster. Water and irrigation systems were severely damaged near the epicenter, and water facilities were demolished in nine villages. Many of the main water pipelines in the affected areas were damaged or destroyed, causing inadequacies in water availability and quality. Surface cracks were observed in Ab Darreh and Changureh, the villages that suffered the heaviest damage, being roughly 25 kilometres (16 mi) from the epicenter.

The relatively low levels of damage in the towns of Avaj or Ab-e-Garm in comparison to Changureh and Ab Darreh suggest a focus of damage to the northwest of the epicenter due to northwest propagation. In Changureh, only two buildings were left standing and over 120 casualties occurred. Ab Darreh also fared poorly; the disaster destroyed the town's only mosque, toppled 40 homes and killed at least 20 people. North of Avaj, in the village of Esmailabad, survivors recovered 38 corpses, a ninth of the total population, while searching for the missing, feared trapped in the ruins. In another village in the vicinity, Aliabad, two shepherds were the only known survivors. In the small village of Kisse-Jin, roughly 80 corpses were recovered following the rupture. Survivors crying and beating their heads and faces over loved ones were a common sight on Iranian state television.

The cost of the damage was estimated at RIs 302 billion. The quake was felt across a wide area, including the provinces of Qazvin, Gilan, Kurdistan, Zanjan, and Hamedan. Of all these, Qazvin was the most heavily damaged, with an unnamed Qazvin official reporting that 177 had died in the province. It was also felt in the capital of Tehran, roughly 290 kilometres (180 mi) east of the epicenter, although no serious damage was reported. However, Iranian journalist Borzou Daragahi reported that in Tehran he saw buildings sway and glass objects shatter.

== Landslides ==
The Bou'in-Zahra earthquake triggered 59 landslides over an area of about 3,600 square kilometres (1,390 sq mi). Landslides formed due to the quake included 47 falls and topples, nine slides, and three lateral spreads. The largest of these slides was a rockslide, 150 × 100 m (490 × 330 ft), which occurred southeast of Changureh. Landslides triggered by the quake occurred more often in the geologic areas most susceptible to damage, where there were many landslides before.

== Relief efforts and aftermath ==
The Red Crescent Society sent relief workers, detection dogs, 100 tons of food, 1,000 tents, 2,500 blankets, and mobile kitchens to the earthquake-stricken area. In addition, the Iranian army supplied soldiers, machinery and water trucks. To prevent the spread of disease, villages were sprayed with disinfectants and their inhabitants were given tetanus shots, among other measures. After Iranian officials launched an appeal for assistance, the United Nations Development Programme supplied $50,000. The United Nations' Office for the Coordination of Humanitarian Affairs (OCHA) mobilised a United Nations Disaster Assessment and Coordination (UNDAC) team, deploying five members. Pope John Paul II prayed for the earthquake victims and asked for a "generous" response.

United States President George W. Bush offered aid to Iran, which he had previously called part of an "axis of evil". According to him, "human suffering knows no political boundaries" and he stood "ready to assist the people of Iran as needed and as desired". However, the Iranian government refused his help, though it called for the help of non-governmental agencies.

According to Hossein Rahnema, head of the Red Crescent in Changureh, the society "levelled an area to put up tents but most people wanted to stay next to their houses to look after their property". Survivors instead lit small fires amongst the rubble to protect against freezing temperatures. The Iranian President at the time, Mohammad Khatami, declared three days of mourning and visited earthquake-stricken areas on 25 June. Hospitals struggled to cope with the surplus of patients, discharging non-critical ones from their wards. The Associated Press stated that twenty funerals were held on 23 June 2002, at a cemetery overlooking the village of Abdareh. A bank account was started to handle public donations for the families of the dead.

Often armed with no more than shovels and spades, soldiers and civilians dug for bodies in the rubble. Other than this, rescue workers were faced with a number of obstacles, including the temperatures of the villages damaged. They were warm during the day, although the villages grew colder at night, making rescue work harder and threatening the health of the homeless and anyone alive and trapped under the debris. Many civilians were discouraged from helping due to fear of aftershocks. According to Gary Oshea of International Rescue, the volunteers did not have enough technical equipment, and the religious leaders seemed unwilling to contribute much. Official rescue work ended on 24 June 2002, when rescue workers said there were no more survivors.

=== Public reaction ===
Of the roughly 80 villages that suffered heavy damage, the Iranian government claimed that relief work was mostly complete. Residents of Changureh, however, complained that tents, food, and medicine had not reached them, after waiting in near-freezing temperatures. A man from Avaj stated that only locals helped uncover the body of his child. In protest at Iran's slow response to the tragedy, some 300 people blocked the main road through Avaj. On 23 June, "dozens" of Avaj residents threw stones at Interior Minister Abdolvahed Mousavi-Lari's car in anger at the government's delay in providing relief. They also claimed that the death toll was higher than official reports said it was.

=== Reconstruction ===
Electricity was restored to affected areas by 25 June. On 9 November 2002, the World Bank granted $225 million towards the reconstruction and economic rehabilitation of the area devastated by the quake. Reconstruction of housing and infrastructure by provincial authorities was interrupted for almost four months (November 2002 – February 2003) due to harsh weather conditions. By August 2003, reconstruction was completed in all villages affected by the earthquake.

== See also ==
- List of earthquakes in 2002
- List of earthquakes in Iran
