= Emamzadeh Qasem =

Emamzadeh Qasem (Persian: امامزاده قاسم), or variants, may refer to:

- Imamzadeh Qasem, Zarqan, Fars
- Emamzadeh Qasem, Isfahan
- Emamzadeh Qasem, Lorestan
- Emamzadeh Qasem, Mazandaran
- Emamzadeh, Qazvin
- Imamzadeh Qasem, Khalilabad, Razavi Khorasan

== See also ==
- List of imamzadehs in Iran
