= Avaj =

City in Qazvin province, Iran

Avaj Persian: آوج
- City
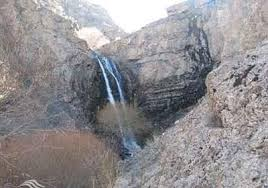

- Location within Iran
- Coordinates: 35°34′48″N 49°13′19″E
- Country: Iran
- Province: Qazvin
- County: Avaj
- District: Central

Population (2016)
  - Total: 5,142
- Time zone: UTC+3:30 (IRST)

Avaj (Persian: آوج) (Note: Also romanized as Avej; also known as Aveh) is a city in the Central District of Avaj County, Qazvin province, Iran, serving as capital of both the county and the district.

== Demographics ==
=== Language ===
The people of Avaj speak Azerbaijani.

=== Population ===
At the time of the 2006 National Census, the city's population was 3,695 in 1,042 households, when it was capital of the former Avaj District of Buin Zahra County. The following census in 2011 counted 5,609 people in 1,616 households. The 2016 census measured the population of the city as 5,142 people in 1,621 households, by which time the district had been separated from the county in the establishment of Avaj County. Avaj was transferred to the new Central District as the county's capital.

== Overview ==
Avaj lies 130 miles (210 km) west of Tehran along Road 37, about 20 kilometres south by road from Abgarm. The city is in an agricultural area. Avaj was near the epicenter of the 2002 Bou'in-Zahra earthquake and thus was severely affected by it, with roughly half the town having been razed.

== Climate ==
Climate data for Avaj (elevation:2,034.9 m (6,676 ft)), normals for 1997-2005
Month	Jan	Feb	Mar	Apr	May	Jun	Jul	Aug	Sep	Oct	Nov	Dec	Year
Daily mean °C (°F)	−1.8 (28.8)	−0.8 (30.6)	4.2 (39.6)	9.9 (49.8)	13.9 (57.0)	19.4 (66.9)	22.0 (71.6)	22.7 (72.9)	18.3 (64.9)	13.1 (55.6)	5.2 (41.4)	1.4 (34.5)	10.6 (51.1)
Average precipitation mm (inches)	43.0 (1.69)	37.3 (1.47)	67.6 (2.66)	63.0 (2.48)	34.9 (1.37)	3.3 (0.13)	7.7 (0.30)	5.4 (0.21)	2.1 (0.08)	31.7 (1.25)	40.4 (1.59)	52.1 (2.05)	388.5 (15.28)
Source: IRIMO

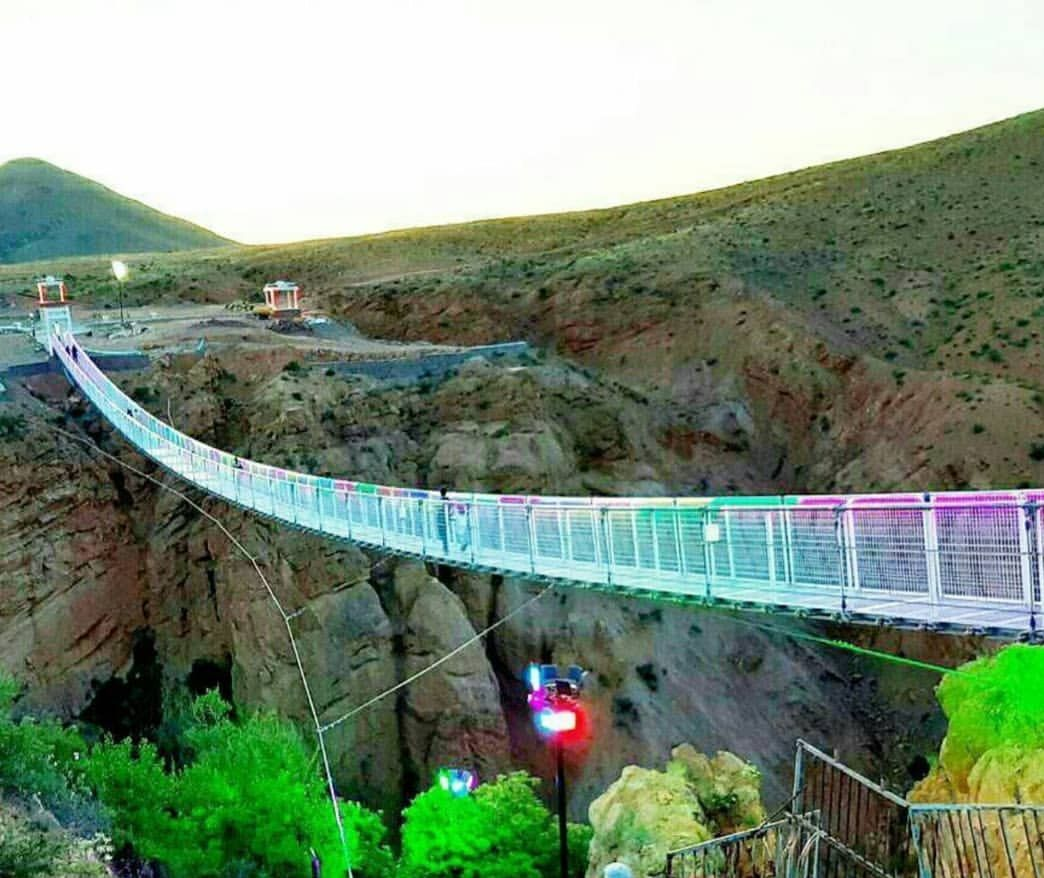
