= Mian Darreh, Mazandaran =

Coordinates: 35.7017°N 49.4475°E

Mian Darreh ميان دره
- Village
- Interactive map of Mian Darreh
- Country: Iran
- Province: Mazandaran
- County: Babol
- Bakhsh: Bandpey-ye Gharbi
- Rural District: Khvosh Rud

Population (2006)
  - Total: 195
- Time zone: UTC+3:30 (IRST)
  - Summer (DST): UTC+4:30 (IRDT)

Mian Darreh (Persian: ميان دره, also Romanized as Mīān Darreh) is a village in Khvosh Rud Rural District, Bandpey-ye Gharbi District, Babol County, Mazandaran Province, Iran. At the 2006 census, its population was 195, in 52 families.
