= Qanqanlu, Hamadan =

Qanqanlu قان قانلو
- Village
- Location within Iran
- Coordinates: 35°25′06″N 48°58′19″E
- Country: Iran
- Province: Hamadan
- County: Razan
- Bakhsh: Central
- Rural District: Razan

Population (2006)
  - Total: 154
- Time zone: UTC+3:30 (IRST)
  - Summer (DST): UTC+4:30 (IRDT)

Qanqanlu (Persian: قان قانلو, also Romanized as Qānqānlū; also known as Ghanqanloo, Kangālu, Kān-i-Ghālu, and Qānqāqlū) is a village in Razan Rural District, in the Central District of Razan County, Hamadan Province, Iran. At the 2006 census, its population was 154, in 34 families.
