= Chubineh, Kermanshah =

Chubineh چوبينه
- Village
- Location within Iran
- Coordinates: 34°39′57″N 47°22′00″E
- Country: Iran
- Province: Kermanshah
- County: Sahneh
- Bakhsh: Dinavar
- Rural District: Horr

Population (2006)
  - Total: 304
- Time zone: UTC+3:30 (IRST)
  - Summer (DST): UTC+4:30 (IRDT)

Chubineh (Persian: چوبينه, also romanized as Chūbīneh; also known as Chouina and Chu Bīna) is a village in Horr Rural District, Dinavar District, Sahneh County, Kermanshah Province, Iran. At the 2006 census its population was 304, in 77 families.
