= Shahidabad Rural District (Avaj County) =

Rural district in Qazvin province, Iran

Shahidabad Rural District Persian: دهستان شهيدآباد
- Rural District
- Location within Iran
- Coordinates: 35°31′N 49°20′E
- Country: Iran
- Province: Qazvin
- County: Avaj
- District: Central
- Established: 1987
- Capital: Shahidabad

Population (2016)
  - Total: 7,808
- Time zone: UTC+3:30 (IRST)

Shahidabad Rural District (Persian: دهستان شهيدآباد) is in the Central District of Avaj County, Qazvin province, Iran. Its capital is the village of Shahidabad.

== Demographics ==
=== Population ===
At the time of the 2006 National Census, the rural district's population (as a part of the former Avaj District of Buin Zahra County) was 7,447 in 1,813 households. There were 7,714 inhabitants in 2,205 households at the following census of 2011. The 2016 census measured the population of the rural district as 7,808 in 2,490 households, by which time the district had been separated from the county in the establishment of Avaj County. The rural district was transferred to the new Central District. The most populous of its 19 villages was Shahidabad, with 1,418 people.

=== Other villages in the rural district ===
- Estalaj
- Harain-e Olya
- Khorus Darreh
- Parsbanaj
- Parvan
- Qahvaj
- Varuq
