= Sirab, Hamadan =

Sirab سيراب
- Village
- Location within Iran
- Coordinates: 35°20′02″N 49°01′35″E
- Country: Iran
- Province: Hamadan
- County: Razan
- Bakhsh: Central
- Rural District: Razan

Population (2006)
  - Total: 330
- Time zone: UTC+3:30 (IRST)
  - Summer (DST): UTC+4:30 (IRDT)

Sirab (Persian: سيراب, also Romanized as Sīrāb) is a village in Razan Rural District, in the Central District of Razan County, Hamadan Province, Iran. At the 2006 census, its population was 330, in 74 families.
