= Kakareza-ye Olya =

Kakareza-ye Olya كاكارضاعليا
- Village
- Location within Iran
- Coordinates: 33°43′30″N 48°15′44″E
- Country: Iran
- Province: Lorestan
- County: Selseleh
- Bakhsh: Central
- Rural District: Honam

Population (2006)
  - Total: 60
- Time zone: UTC+3:30 (IRST)
  - Summer (DST): UTC+4:30 (IRDT)

Kakareza-ye Olya (Persian: كاكارضاعليا, also Romanized as Kākāreẕā-ye ‘Olya; also known as Emāmzādeh-ye Kākā Reẕā, Kākā Rezā, Kākā Rezā Bālā, Kākā Reẕā-ye ‘Olya, and Shahrak-e Kākā Reẕā-ye ‘Olyā) is a village in Honam Rural District, in the Central District of Selseleh County, Lorestan Province, Iran. At the 2006 census, its population was 60, in 12 families.
