= Emamzadeh Abbas, Kermanshah =

Emamzadeh Abbas امامزاده عباس
- Village
- Location within Iran
- Coordinates: 34°37′44″N 47°27′11″E
- Country: Iran
- Province: Kermanshah
- County: Sahneh
- Bakhsh: Central
- Rural District: Hojr

Population (2006)
  - Total: 19
- Time zone: UTC+3:30 (IRST)
  - Summer (DST): UTC+4:30 (IRDT)

Emamzadeh Abbas (Persian: امامزاده عباس, also Romanized as Emāmzādeh ‘Abbās; also known as Emāmzādeh and Emāmzādeh ‘Abbās‘alī) is a village in Hojr Rural District, in the Central District of Sahneh County, Kermanshah Province, Iran. At the 2006 census, its population was 19, in 4 families.
