= Qarkh Bolagh, Charuymaq =

Qarkh Bolagh قرخ بلاغ
- Village
- Location within Iran
- Coordinates: 37°05′32″N 46°52′13″E
- Country: Iran
- Province: East Azerbaijan
- County: Charuymaq
- Bakhsh: Central
- Rural District: Charuymaq-e Markazi

Population (2006)
  - Total: 203
- Time zone: UTC+3:30 (IRST)
  - Summer (DST): UTC+4:30 (IRDT)

Qarkh Bolagh (Persian: قرخ بلاغ, also Romanized as Qarkh Bolāgh) is a village in Charuymaq-e Markazi Rural District, in the Central District of Charuymaq County, East Azerbaijan Province, Iran. At the 2006 census, its population was 203, in 37 families.
