= Milaq, East Azerbaijan =

Milaq ميلق
- Village
- Location within Iran
- Coordinates: 38°37′16″N 46°12′20″E
- Country: Iran
- Province: East Azerbaijan
- County: Varzaqan
- Bakhsh: Kharvana
- Rural District: Dizmar-e Markazi

Population (2006)
  - Total: 116
- Time zone: UTC+3:30 (IRST)
  - Summer (DST): UTC+4:30 (IRDT)

Milaq (Persian: ميلق, also Romanized as Mīlaq, Meylaq, and Meyleq; also known as Meila, Meyla, and Meylī) is a village in Dizmar-e Markazi Rural District, Kharvana District, Varzaqan County, East Azerbaijan Province, Iran. At the 2006 census, its population was 116, in 27 families.
