= Abgarm Rural District =

Rural district in Qazvin province, Iran

Abgarm Rural District Persian: دهستان آبگرم
- Rural District
- Location within Iran
- Coordinates: 35°45′N 49°18′E
- Country: Iran
- Province: Qazvin
- County: Avaj
- District: Abgarm
- Established: 1987
- Capital: Abgarm

Population (2016)
  - Total: 5,220
- Time zone: UTC+3:30 (IRST)

Abgarm Rural District (Persian: دهستان آبگرم) is in Abgarm District of Avaj County, Qazvin province, Iran. It is administered from the city of Abgarm.

== Demographics ==
=== Population ===
At the time of the 2006 National Census, the rural district's population (as a part of Buin Zahra County) was 5,154 in 1,328 households. There were 4,873 inhabitants in 1,526 households at the following census of 2011. The 2016 census measured the population of the rural district as 5,220 in 1,711 households, by which time the district had been separated from the county in the establishment of Avaj County. The most populous of its 22 villages was Aruchan, with a population of 531 people.

=== Other villages in the rural district ===
- Asyan
- Beheshtian
- Dakhrajin
- Najafabad
- Qameshlu
- Sagharan-e Olya
- Shakhdar
- Yasti Bolagh
