= Kharaqan-e Sharqi Rural District =

Rural district in Qazvin province, Iran

Kharaqan-e Sharqi Rural District Persian: دهستان خرقان شرقی
- Rural District
- Location within Iran
- Coordinates: 35°36′N 49°31′E
- Country: Iran
- Province: Qazvin
- County: Avaj
- District: Abgarm
- Established: 1987
- Capital: Kolanjin

Population (2016)
  - Total: 6,709
- Time zone: UTC+3:30 (IRST)

Kharaqan-e Sharqi Rural District (Persian: دهستان خرقان شرقی) is in Abgarm District of Avaj County, Qazvin province, Iran. Its capital is the village of Kolanjin.

== Demographics ==
=== Population ===
At the time of the 2006 National Census, the rural district's population (as a part of Buin Zahra County) was 5,478 in 1,457 households. There were 6,065 inhabitants in 1,943 households at the following census of 2011. The 2016 census measured the population of the rural district as 6,709 in 2,219 households, by which time the district had been separated from the county in the establishment of Avaj County. The most populous of its 32 villages was Kolanjin, with 1,080 people.

=== Other villages in the rural district ===
- Arteshabad
- Danak
- Qarah Dash Parchik
- Sabzak
- Shingel
- Sir Ab
- Tuabad
