= Hesar-e Valiyeasr Rural District =

Rural district in Qazvin province, Iran

Hesar-e Valiyeasr Rural District Persian: دهستان حصار وليعصر
- Rural District
- Location within Iran
- Coordinates: 35°49′N 48°55′E
- Country: Iran
- Province: Qazvin
- County: Avaj
- District: Central
- Established: 1987
- Capital: Hesar-e Valiyeasr

Population (2016)
  - Total: 9,883
- Time zone: UTC+3:30 (IRST)

Hesar-e Valiyeasr Rural District (Persian: دهستان حصار وليعصر) is in the Central District of Avaj County, Qazvin province, Iran. Its capital is the village of Hesar-e Valiyeasr.

== Demographics ==
=== Population ===
At the time of the 2006 National Census, the rural district's population (as a part of the former Avaj District of Buin Zahra County) was 9,050 in 2,177 households. There were 10,212 inhabitants in 3,003 households at the following census of 2011. The 2016 census measured the population of the rural district as 9,883 in 2,940 households, by which time the district had been separated from the county in the establishment of Avaj County. The rural district was transferred to the new Central District. The most populous of its 33 villages was Ardalan, with 2,375 people.

=== Other villages in the rural district ===
- Azanbar
- Changureh
- Dashtak
- Lak
- Mahmudabad
- Qanqanlu
- Saidabad
