= Avaj District =

Former district in Qazvin province, Iran

Avaj District Persian: بخش آوج
- Former District
- Location within Iran
- Coordinates: 35°42′N 49°12′E
- Country: Iran
- Province: Qazvin
- County: Buin Zahra
- Established: 1996
- Capital: Avaj

Population (2011)
  - Total: 26,611
- Time zone: UTC+3:30 (IRST)

Avaj District (Persian: بخش آوج) is a former administrative division of Buin Zahra County, Qazvin province, Iran. Its capital was the city of Avaj.

== History ==
In 2012, the district was separated from the county in the establishment of Avaj County.

== Demographics ==
=== Population ===
At the time of the 2006 National Census, the district's population was 22,273 in 5,607 households. The following census in 2011 counted 26,611 people in 7,839 households.

=== Administrative divisions ===
Avaj District Population
| Administrative Divisions | 2006 | 2011 |
|---|---|---|
| Hesar-e Valiyeasr RD | 9,050 | 10,212 |
| Kharaqan-e Gharbi RD | 2,081 | 3,076 |
| Shahidabad RD | 7,447 | 7,714 |
| Avaj (city) | 3,695 | 5,609 |
| Total | 22,273 | 26,611 |
RD = Rural District
