= Abgarm District =

District in Qazvin province, Iran

Abgarm District Persian: بخش آبگرم
- District
- Location within Iran
- Coordinates: 35°41′N 49°23′E
- Country: Iran
- Province: Qazvin
- County: Avaj
- Established: 2000
- Capital: Abgarm

Population (2016)
  - Total: 18,265
- Time zone: UTC+3:30 (IRST)

Abgarm District (Persian: بخش آبگرم) is in Avaj County, Qazvin province, Iran. Its capital is the city of Abgarm.

== History ==
In 2012, the district was separated from Buin Zahra County in the establishment of Avaj County.

== Demographics ==
=== Population ===
At the time of the 2006 National Census, the district's population (as a part of Buin Zahra County) was 15,823 in 4,130 households. The following census in 2011 counted 16,936 people in 5,165 households. The 2016 census measured the population of the district as 18,265 inhabitants in 5,833 households.

=== Administrative divisions ===
Abgarm District Population (Note: As a part of Buin Zahra County at the 2006 and 2011 censuses)
Administrative Divisions	2006	2011	2016
Abgarm RD	5,154	4,873	5,220
Kharaqan-e Sharqi RD	5,478	6,065	6,709
Abgarm (city)	5,191	5,998	6,336
Total	15,823	16,936	18,265
RD = Rural District
