= Central District (Avaj County) =

District in Qazvin province, Iran

Central District (Avaj County) Persian: بخش مرکزی شهرستان آوج
- District
- Location within Iran
- Coordinates: 35°41′N 49°10′E
- Country: Iran
- Province: Qazvin
- County: Avaj
- Established: 2012
- Capital: Avaj

Population (2016)
  - Total: 25,532
- Time zone: UTC+3:30 (IRST)

The Central District of Avaj County (Persian: بخش مرکزی شهرستان آوج) is in Qazvin province, Iran. Its capital is the city of Avaj.

== History ==
In 2012, Abgarm and Avaj Districts were separated from Buin Zahra County in the establishment of Avaj County, which was divided into two districts and five rural districts, with Avaj as its capital.

== Demographics ==
=== Population ===
At the time of the 2016 National Census, the district's population was 25,532 inhabitants in 7,984 households.

=== Administrative divisions ===
Central District (Avaj County) Population
Administrative Divisions	2016
Hesar-e Valiyeasr RD	9,883
Kharaqan-e Gharbi RD	2,699
Shahidabad RD	7,808
Avaj (city)	5,142
Total	25,532
RD = Rural District
