= Avaj County =

County in Qazvin province, Iran

Avaj County Persian: شهرستان آوج
- County
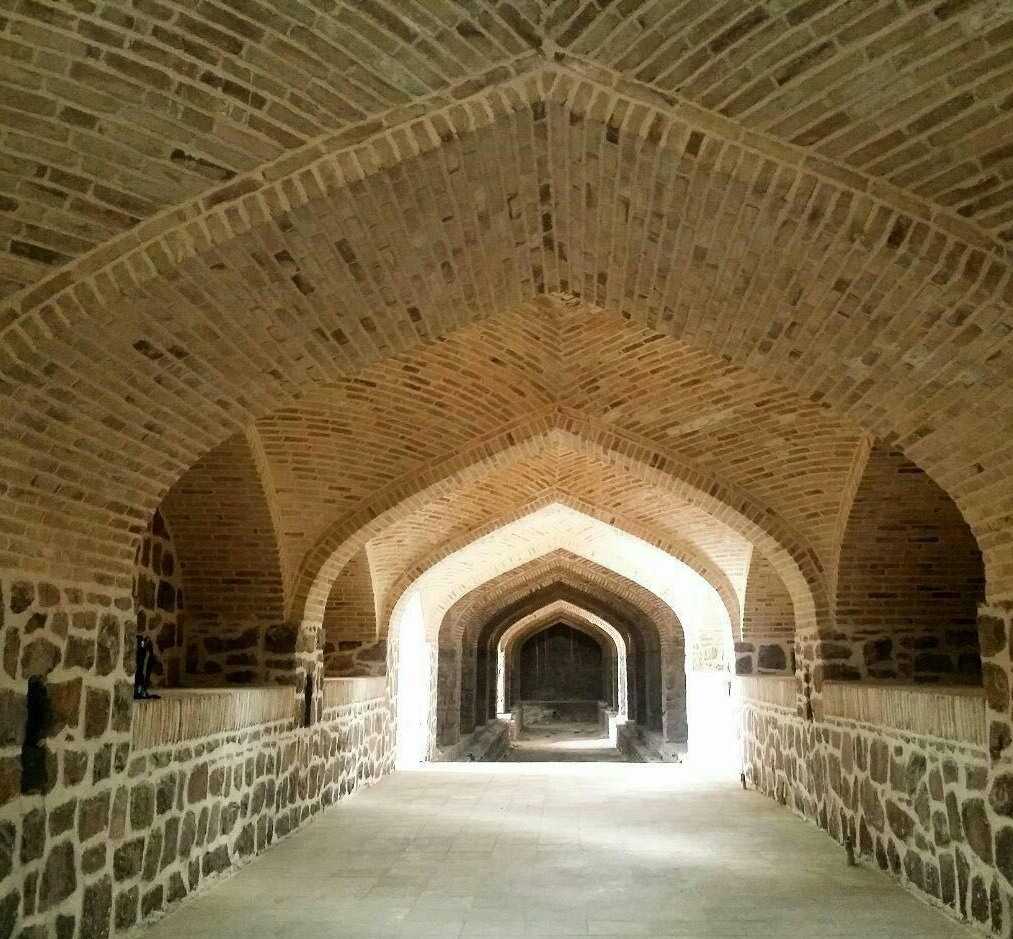
- Caravanserai in Avaj County

- Location of Avaj County in Qazvin province (left, purple)

- Location of Qazvin province in Iran
- Coordinates: 35°42′N 49°12′E
- Country: Iran
- Province: Qazvin
- Established: 2012
- Capital: Avaj
- Districts: Central, Abgarm

Population (2016)
  - Total: 43,798
- Time zone: UTC+3:30 (IRST)

Avaj County (Persian: شهرستان آوج) is in Qazvin province, Iran. Its capital is the city of Avaj.

== History ==
In 2012, Abgarm and Avaj Districts were separated from Buin Zahra County in the establishment of Avaj County, which was divided into two districts and five rural districts, with Avaj as its capital.

== Demographics ==
=== Population ===
At the time of the 2016 National Census, the county's population was 43,798 in 13,818 households.

=== Administrative divisions ===
Avaj County's population and administrative structure are shown in the following table.

Avaj County Population
Administrative Divisions	2016
Central District	25,532
Hesar-e Valiyeasr RD	9,883
Kharaqan-e Gharbi RD	2,699
Shahidabad RD	7,808
Avaj (city)	5,142
Abgarm District	18,265
Abgarm RD	5,220
Kharaqan-e Sharqi RD	6,709
Abgarm (city)	6,336
Total	43,798
RD = Rural District

== See also ==
Media related to Avaj County at Wikimedia Commons
