= Rahmatabad =

Rahmatabad (Persian: رحمت آباد) may refer to the following villages and towns. All are located in Iran.

== Castle ==
- Rahmatabad castle, a castle in Yazd Province

== Fars Province ==
- Rahmatabad, Arsanjan, a village in Arsanjan County
- Rahmatabad, Eqlid, a village in Eqlid County
- Rahmatabad, Fasa, a village in Fasa County
- Rahmatabad, Jahrom, a village in Jahrom County
- Rahmatabad, Pasargad, a village in Pasargad County
- Rahmatabad, Shiraz, a village in Shiraz County
- Rahmatabad Mound
- Rahmatabad District (Zarqan County), an administrative division
- Rahmatabad Rural District (Zarqan County), an administrative division

== Gilan Province ==
- Rahmatabad Rural District (Gilan Province)

== Golestan Province ==
- Rahmatabad, Golestan

== Isfahan Province ==
- Rahmatabad, Ardestan, a village in Ardestan County
- Rahmatabad, Zavareh, a village in Ardestan County
- Rahmatabad, Khvansar, a village in Khvansar County
- Rahmatabad, Lenjan, a village in Lenjan County
- Rahmatabad, Najafabad, a village in Najafabad County
- Rahmatabad, Natanz, a village in Natanz County
- Rahmatabad, Tiran and Karvan, a village in Tiran and Karvan County

== Kerman Province ==
- Rahmatabad, Anbarabad, a village in Anbarabad County
- Rahmatabad, Arzuiyeh, a village in Arzuiyeh County
- Rahmatabad, Baft, a village in Baft County
- Rahmatabad, Fahraj, a village in Fahraj County
- Rahmatabad, Rafsanjan, a village in Rafsanjan County
- Rahmatabad, Koshkuiyeh, a village in Rafsanjan County
- Rahmatabad, Rigan, a village in Rigan County
- Rahmatabad District (Rigan County), an administrative division
- Rahmatabad-e Kataki, a village in Rudbar-e Jonubi County
- Rahmatabad-e Mian Deran, a village in Rudbar-e Jonubi County
- Rahmatabad-e Salehiha, a village in Sirjan County
- Rahmatabad, Zarand, a village in Zarand County

== Kermanshah Province ==
- Rahmatabad, Kangavar, a village in Kangavar County
- Rahmatabad, Kermanshah, a village in Kermanshah County

== Kurdistan Province ==
- Rahmatabad, Kurdistan, a village in Bijar County

== Lorestan Province ==
- Rahmatabad, Pol-e Dokhtar
- Rahmatabad, Selseleh

== Markazi Province ==
- Rahmatabad, Markazi

== North Khorasan Province ==
- Rahmatabad, North Khorasan

== Qazvin Province ==
- Rahmatabad-e Bozorg
- Rahmatabad-e Kuchak

== Qom Province ==
- Rahmatabad, Qom

== Razavi Khorasan Province ==
- Rahmatabad, Gonabad, a village in Gonabad County
- Rahmatabad, Jowayin, a village in Jowayin County
- Rahmatabad, Nishapur, a village in Nishapur County
- Rahmatabad, Sarakhs, a village in Sarakhs County
- Rahmatabad, Torbat-e Jam, a village in Torbat-e Jam County
- Rahmatabad, Zaveh, a village in Zaveh County

== Sistan and Baluchestan Province ==
- Rahmatabad, Chabahar, a village in Chabahar County
- Rahmatabad, Eskelabad, a village in Khash County
- Rahmatabad, Qasr-e Qand, a village in Qasr-e Qand County

== South Khorasan Province ==
- Rahmatabad, Ferdows, a village in Ferdows County
- Rahmatabad, Tabas, a village in Tabas County

== Yazd Province ==
- Rahmatabad, Abarkuh, a village in Abarkuh County
- Rahmatabad, Aqda, a village in Ardakan County
- Rahmatabad, Khatam, a village in Khatam County

== Zanjan Province ==
- Rahmatabad, Khodabandeh, a village in Khodabandeh County
- Rahmatabad, Khorramdarreh, a village in Khorramdarreh County
