= Rahmat =

Rahmat may refer to:

== People ==
- Rahmat Akbari (b. 2000), Australian association football player
- Rahmat Erwin Abdullah (b. 2000), Indonesian weightlifter
- Rahmat Rivai (b. 1977), Indonesian footballer
- Rahmat Shah Sail (b. 1943), Pashto writer
- Basuki Rahmat (1921-1969), Indonesian general
- Mohamed Rahmat (1938-2010), Malaysian politician
- M. Rahmat, Indonesian footballer
- Rahmatullah Rahmat, Afghan politician
- Rahmat Mohamad, Former Secretary General of Asian-African Legal Consultative Organization; Professor of Law at Universiti Teknologi MARA Malaysia
- Iskandar Rahmat (b. 1979), convicted murderer in Singapore
- Fazely bin Rahmat, a convicted gang member of Salakau in Singapore.

== Places ==
- Rahmatabad, Selseleh, a village in Lorestan Province, Iran
- Rahmat Rural District, in Fars Province, Iran

== Other uses ==
- KD Rahmat, Malaysian Navy ship
- Rahmat Cinta, a 2017 Indonesian television series
