= Arjanak, Isfahan =

Village in Isfahan province, Iran

Arjanak Persian: ارجنک
- Village
- Location within Iran
- Coordinates: 33°19′42″N 50°10′31″E
- Country: Iran
- Province: Isfahan
- County: Khansar
- District: Central
- Rural District: Golsar

Population (2016)
  - Total: 1,084
- Time zone: UTC+3:30 (IRST)

Arjanak (Persian: ارجنک) (Note: Also romanized as Arjanak; also known as Arjang) is a village in, and the capital of, Golsar Rural District (Note: Formerly Poshtkuh Rural District) in the Central District of Khansar County, Isfahan province, Iran. The previous capital of the rural district was the village of Vist, now a city.

== Demographics ==
=== Population ===
At the time of the 2006 National Census, the village's population was 1,149 in 317 households. The following census in 2011 counted 1,137 people in 325 households. The 2016 census measured the population of the village as 1,084 people in 365 households.
