= Kham Pich =

Village in Isfahan province, Iran

Kham Pich Persian: خم پيچ
- Village
- Location within Iran
- Coordinates: 33°18′04″N 50°26′40″E
- Country: Iran
- Province: Isfahan
- County: Khansar
- District: Central
- Rural District: Kuhsar

Population (2016)
  - Total: 1,414
- Time zone: UTC+3:30 (IRST)

Kham Pich (Persian: خم پيچ) (Note: Also romanized as Khom Pīch and Khompīch; also known as Kham va Pīch, Kham-o-Pīch, and Khumpīch) is a village in Kuhsar Rural District of the Central District in Khansar County, Isfahan province, Iran.

== Demographics ==
=== Population ===
At the time of the 2006 National Census, the village's population was 1,378 in 413 households. The following census in 2011 counted 1,259 people in 404 households. The 2016 census measured the population of the village as 1,414 people in 480 households, the most populous in its rural district.
