= Dushkharat =

Village in Isfahan province, Iran

Dushkharat Persian: دوشخراط
- Village
- Location within Iran
- Coordinates: 33°08′53″N 50°26′46″E
- Country: Iran
- Province: Isfahan
- County: Khansar
- District: Central
- Rural District: Cheshmeh Sar

Population (2016)
  - Total: 1,526
- Time zone: UTC+3:30 (IRST)

Dushkharat (Persian: دوشخراط) (Note: Also romanized as Doosh Kharrat, Dowshkharāţ, Dūsh Kharrāţ, and Dūshkharāt; also known as Do Shakhkharāţ, Gush Kharād, and Gūshkāreh) is a village in Cheshmeh Sar Rural District of the Central District in Khansar County, Isfahan province, Iran.

== Demographics ==
=== Population ===
At the time of the 2006 National Census, the village's population was 1,464 in 378 households. The following census in 2011 counted 1,474 people in 433 households. The 2016 census measured the population of the village as 1,526 people in 466 households, the most populous in its rural district.
