= Khoshk Rud, Isfahan =

Village in Isfahan province, Iran

Khoshk Rud Persian: خشكرود
- Village
- Location within Iran
- Coordinates: 33°19′38″N 50°13′13″E
- Country: Iran
- Province: Isfahan
- County: Khansar
- District: Central
- Rural District: Golsar

Population (2016)
  - Total: 212
- Time zone: UTC+3:30 (IRST)

Khoshk Rud (Persian: خشكرود) (Note: Also romanized as Khoshk Rūd; also known as Khoshke Rūd, Khoshkeh Rood, Khoshkeh Rūd, and Khushkrūd) is a village in Golsar Rural District (Note: Formerly Poshtkuh Rural District) of the Central District in Khansar County, Isfahan province, Iran.

== Demographics ==
=== Population ===
At the time of the 2006 National Census, the village's population was 287 in 79 households. The following census in 2011 counted 235 people in 71 households. The 2016 census measured the population of the village as 212 people in 72 households.
