= Kert =

Kert may refer to:

== Places ==
- Kert, Nagorno-Karabakh
- Kert, Iran

== People ==
Surname

- Johannes Kert (1959–2021), Estonian politician and military officer
- Larry Kert (1930–1991), American actor

Given name

- Kert Haavistu (born 1980), Estonian footballer
- Kert Kesküla (1975–2011), Estonian basketball player
- Kert Kingo (born 1968), Estonian politician
- Kert Kütt (born 1980), Estonian footballer
- Kert Toobal (born 1979), Estonian volleyball player
