= Kavand =

Kavand (Persian: كوند or كاوند or كواند) may refer to:

- Kavand, Chaharmahal and Bakhtiari (كاوند - Kāvand)
- Kavand, East Azerbaijan (كواند - Kavānd)
- Kavand, Kohgiluyeh and Boyer-Ahmad (كاوند - Kāvand)
- Kavand, Qazvin (كوند - Kavand)
- Kavand, Zanjan (كاوند - Kāvand)
