= Safadasht, Isfahan =

Village in Isfahan province, Iran

Safadasht Persian: صفادشت
- Village
- Location within Iran
- Coordinates: 33°16′27″N 50°23′28″E
- Country: Iran
- Province: Isfahan
- County: Khansar
- District: Central
- Rural District: Cheshmeh Sar

Population (2016)
  - Total: 81
- Time zone: UTC+3:30 (IRST)

Safadasht (Persian: صفادشت) (Note: Also romanized as Şafādasht) is a village in Cheshmeh Sar Rural District of the Central District in Khansar County, Isfahan province, Iran.

== Demographics ==
=== Population ===
At the time of the 2006 National Census, the village's population was 80 in 27 households. The following census in 2011 counted 75 people in 26 households. The 2016 census measured the population of the village as 81 people in 32 households.
