= Layjand =

Village in Isfahan province, Iran

Layjand Persian: لايجند
- Village
- Location within Iran
- Coordinates: 33°12′57″N 50°25′09″E
- Country: Iran
- Province: Isfahan
- County: Khansar
- District: Central
- Rural District: Cheshmeh Sar

Population (2016)
  - Total: 129
- Time zone: UTC+3:30 (IRST)

Layjand (Persian: لايجند) (Note: Also romanized as Lā’ījond, Lāyjand, and Lāyjond; also known as Lāgund, Lārījand, and Lījand) is a village in Cheshmeh Sar Rural District of the Central District in Khansar County, Isfahan province, Iran.

== Demographics ==
=== Population ===
At the time of the 2006 National Census, the village's population was 163 in 54 households. The following census in 2011 counted 154 people in 49 households. The 2016 census measured the population of the village as 129 people in 44 households.
