= Kharuzak =

Kharuzak خروزك
- Village
- Location within Iran
- Coordinates: 36°02′29″N 49°54′06″E
- Country: Iran
- Province: Qazvin
- County: Buin Zahra
- Bakhsh: Dashtabi
- Rural District: Dashtabi-ye Gharbi

Population (2006)
  - Total: 41
- Time zone: UTC+3:30 (IRST)
  - Summer (DST): UTC+4:30 (IRDT)

Kharuzak (Persian: خروزك, also Romanized as Kharūzak and Kharoozak; also known as Khūrīk, Kharūzān, and Khūrīzak) is a village in Dashtabi-ye Gharbi Rural District, Dashtabi District, Buin Zahra County, Qazvin Province, Iran. At the 2006 census, its population was 41, in 9 families.
