= Hajj Bolagh =

Village in Isfahan province, Iran

Hajj Bolagh Persian: حاج بلاغ
- Village
- Location within Iran
- Coordinates: 33°14′34″N 50°36′56″E
- Country: Iran
- Province: Isfahan
- County: Khansar
- District: Central
- Rural District: Kuhsar

Population (2016)
  - Total: 25
- Time zone: UTC+3:30 (IRST)

Hajj Bolagh (Persian: حاج بلاغ) (Note: Also romanized as Haj Bolagh and Ḩājj Bolāgh; also known as Ḩājī Bolāgh, Hājībulāgh, and Ḩājjī Bolāgh) is a village in Kuhsar Rural District of the Central District in Khansar County, Isfahan province, Iran.

== Demographics ==
=== Population ===
At the time of the 2006 National Census, the village's population was 49 in 20 households. The following census in 2011 counted 20 people in 11 households. The 2016 census measured the population of the village as 25 people in 12 households.
