= Sang-e Sefid, Isfahan =

Village in Isfahan province, Iran

Sang-e Sefid Persian: سنگ سفيد
- Village
- Location within Iran
- Coordinates: 33°11′48″N 50°22′56″E
- Country: Iran
- Province: Isfahan
- County: Khansar
- District: Central
- Rural District: Cheshmeh Sar

Population (2016)
  - Total: 401
- Time zone: UTC+3:30 (IRST)

Sang-e Sefid (Persian: سنگ سفيد) (Note: Also romanized as Sang Sefīd and Sang-e Sefīd) is a village in Cheshmeh Sar Rural District of the Central District in Khansar County, Isfahan province, Iran.

== Demographics ==
=== Population ===
At the time of the 2006 National Census, the village's population was 634 in 160 households. The following census in 2011 counted 524 people in 156 households. The 2016 census measured the population of the village as 401 people in 135 households.
