= Hasanabad, Khansar =

Village in Isfahan province, Iran

Hasanabad Persian: حسن اباد
- Village
- Location within Iran
- Coordinates: 33°22′41″N 50°03′33″E
- Country: Iran
- Province: Isfahan
- County: Khansar
- District: Central
- Rural District: Golsar

Population (2016)
  - Total: 48
- Time zone: UTC+3:30 (IRST)

Hasanabad (Persian: حسن اباد) (Note: Also romanized as Ḩasanābād; also known as Hasan Abad Poshtkooh) is a village in Golsar Rural District (Note: Formerly Poshtkuh Rural District) of the Central District in Khansar County, Isfahan province, Iran.

== Demographics ==
=== Population ===
At the time of the 2006 National Census, the village's population was 50 in 14 households. The following census in 2011 counted 45 people in 14 households. The 2016 census measured the population of the village as 48 people in 15 households.
