= Mehrabad, Khansar =

Village in Isfahan province, Iran

Mehrabad Persian: مهراباد
- Village
- Location within Iran
- Coordinates: 33°14′44″N 50°28′06″E
- Country: Iran
- Province: Isfahan
- County: Khansar
- District: Central
- Rural District: Kuhsar

Population (2016)
  - Total: 101
- Time zone: UTC+3:30 (IRST)

Mehrabad (Persian: مهراباد) (Note: Also romanized as Mehrābād) is a village in Kuhsar Rural District of the Central District in Khansar County, Isfahan province, Iran.

== Demographics ==
=== Population ===
At the time of the 2006 National Census, the village's population was 119 in 43 households. The following census in 2011 counted 151 people in 51 households. The 2016 census measured the population of the village as 101 people in 40 households.
