= Tajareh, Khansar =

Village in Isfahan province, Iran

Tajareh Persian: تجره
- Village
- Location within Iran
- Coordinates: 33°14′10″N 50°28′47″E
- Country: Iran
- Province: Isfahan
- County: Khansar
- District: Central
- Rural District: Kuhsar

Population (2016)
  - Total: 348
- Time zone: UTC+3:30 (IRST)

Tajareh (Persian: تجره) (Note: Also romanized as Tajreh) is a village in Kuhsar Rural District of the Central District in Khansar County, Isfahan province, Iran.

== Demographics ==
=== Population ===
At the time of the 2006 National Census, the village's population was 362 in 136 households. The following census in 2011 counted 321 people in 122 households. The 2016 census measured the population of the village as 348 people in 131 households.
