= Tatnak =

Tatnak تتنك
- Village
- Location within Iran
- Coordinates: 36°02′10″N 49°54′56″E
- Country: Iran
- Province: Qazvin
- County: Buin Zahra
- Bakhsh: Dashtabi
- Rural District: Dashtabi-ye Sharqi

Population (2006)
  - Total: 99
- Time zone: UTC+3:30 (IRST)
  - Summer (DST): UTC+4:30 (IRDT)

Tatnak (Persian: تتنك, also Romanized as Tatnag) is a village in Dashtabi-ye Sharqi Rural District, Dashtabi District, Buin Zahra County, Qazvin Province, Iran. At the 2006 census, its population was 99, in 24 families. It was founded by Boukralfa in the middle of the 19th century.
