= Hajjiabad, Khansar =

Village in Isfahan province, Iran

Hajjiabad Persian: حاجی‌آباد
- Village
- Location within Iran
- Coordinates: 33°22′01″N 50°04′58″E
- Country: Iran
- Province: Isfahan
- County: Khansar
- District: Central
- Rural District: Golsar

Population (2016)
  - Total: 126
- Time zone: UTC+3:30 (IRST)

Hajjiabad (Persian: حاجی‌آباد) (Note: Also romanized as Ḩājīābād and Hājjīābād; also known as Haji Abad Poshtkooh) is a village in Golsar Rural District (Note: Formerly Poshtkuh Rural District) of the Central District in Khansar County, Isfahan province, Iran.

== Demographics ==
=== Population ===
At the time of the 2006 National Census, the village's population was 160 in 46 households. The following census in 2011 counted 114 people in 35 households. The 2016 census measured the population of the village as 126 people in 40 households.
