= Hakimabad, Qazvin =

Hakimabad حكيم اباد
- Village
- Location within Iran
- Coordinates: 36°07′01″N 49°54′10″E
- Country: Iran
- Province: Qazvin
- County: Buin Zahra
- Bakhsh: Dashtabi
- Rural District: Dashtabi-ye Sharqi

Population (2006)
  - Total: 183
- Time zone: UTC+3:30 (IRST)
  - Summer (DST): UTC+4:30 (IRDT)

Hakimabad (Persian: حكيم اباد, also Romanized as Ḩakīmābād; also known as Khanamabad and Khānomābād) is a village in Dashtabi-ye Sharqi Rural District, Dashtabi District, Buin Zahra County, Qazvin Province, Iran. At the 2006 census, its population was 183, in 46 families.
