= Qaleh-ye Baba Mohammad =

Village in Isfahan province, Iran

Qaleh-ye Baba Mohammad Persian: قلعه بابامحمد
- Village
- Location within Iran
- Coordinates: 33°10′04″N 50°24′54″E
- Country: Iran
- Province: Isfahan
- County: Khansar
- District: Central
- Rural District: Cheshmeh Sar

Population (2016)
  - Total: 47
- Time zone: UTC+3:30 (IRST)

Qaleh-ye Baba Mohammad (Persian: قلعه بابامحمد) (Note: Also romanized as Qal‘eh Bābā Mohammad and Qal‘eh-ye Bābā Moḩammad; also known as Ghal‘eh Baba Moḩammad) is a village in Cheshmeh Sar Rural District of the Central District in Khansar County, Isfahan province, Iran.

== Demographics ==
=== Population ===
At the time of the 2006 National Census, the village's population was 92 in 29 households. The following census in 2011 counted 56 people in 20 households. The 2016 census measured the population of the village as 47 people in 16 households.
