= Latamber =

Latamber Latammar
- Town
- Interactive map of Latamber
- Coordinates: 33.1095°N 70.8771°E
- Country: Pakistan
- Province: Khyber Pakhtunkhwa
- District: Karak District
- Tehsil: Karak Tehsil

Population (2023)
  - Total: 44,029
- Time zone: UTC+5 (PST)
- Calling code: 0927

Latamber (also spelled Latammar) is a town in Karak District of Khyber Pakhtunkhwa, Pakistan. It is the seat of Union Council Latamber and lies in the eastern part of the district, about 29 km (18 mi) east of Bannu.

== Geography ==
Latamber lies in the eastern part of Karak District. Roads connect it with Bannu, Kamali Banda and the Indus Highway (via Warana).

== Administration ==
Latamber is a Union Council of Karak District, and government reporting continues to refer to Union Council Latambar. Under the later local-government structure, the Election Commission of Pakistan lists the following village councils in the area:

- Latamber Sharqi
- Latamber Gharbi
- Surdag
- Warana Latamber

=== Associated settlements ===
Government education records list the following settlements under the Latamber Union Council:

- Aral Adam Banda
- Surdag
- Kamali Banda
- Sharif Wala
- Shobli Banda (Surdag)
- Warana Latamber (Gharbi)

== Demographics ==
According to the 2023 Census of Pakistan, conducted by the Pakistan Bureau of Statistics, the Latamber Population Census (PC) had a population of 48,996. The census table records the locality of Latamber separately with 44,029 inhabitants, and Mandawa with 4,967.

== History ==
Latamber (Latammar in the local Pashto dialect) has traditionally been inhabited by sections of the Barak branch of the Khattak tribe. According to the Gazetteer of Kohat District, the Kami Khel are associated with Latammar and Surdag, while the Rehmat Khel are associated with Garuzi, also known as Rehmatabad.

== Infrastructure ==
=== Transport ===
The Communication and Works Department has recorded schemes for the Latamber–Kamali Banda Road and the Latamber–Indus Highway Road via Warana. A Karak–Bannu link road project has also been approved by the provincial government.

=== Water resources ===
Latamber Dam is a small dam project in the Latamber area, listed among the district's development projects in provincial government records.

== Education ==
The District Education Officer (Male) Karak records list government primary schools in Latamber, Aral Adam Banda, Surdag, Kamali Banda, Sharif Wala, Shobli Banda (Surdag) and Warana Latamber (Gharbi). A government girls' degree college has also been included in development planning for Latamber.

== See also ==
- Karak District
- Karak Tehsil
- Bannu
- Khattak
