= Vist =

Vist may refer to:

- Vist, Iran
- Vist Station
- Serbian whist
