= Nosratabad-e Bayeh =

Nosratabad-e Bayeh نصرتابادبايه
- Village
- Location within Iran
- Coordinates: 36°05′43″N 49°59′58″E
- Country: Iran
- Province: Qazvin
- County: Buin Zahra
- Bakhsh: Dashtabi
- Rural District: Dashtabi-ye Sharqi

Population (2006)
  - Total: 169
- Time zone: UTC+3:30 (IRST)
  - Summer (DST): UTC+4:30 (IRDT)

Nosratabad-e Bayeh (Persian: نصرتابادبايه, also Romanized as Noşratābād-e Bāyeh; also known as Noşratābād-e Bābeh, Bāya, and Bāyeh) is a village in Dashtabi-ye Sharqi Rural District, Dashtabi District, Buin Zahra County, Qazvin Province, Iran. At the 2006 census, its population was 169, in 37 families.
