= Qudejan =

Village in Isfahan province, Iran

Ghoudjan Persian: قودجان
- Village
- Ghoudjan
- Location within Iran
- Coordinates: 33°16′52″N 50°18′58″E
- Country: Iran
- Province: Isfahan
- County: Khansar
- District: Central
- Rural District: Cheshmeh Sar

Population (2016)
  - Total: 1,472
- Time zone: UTC+3:30 (IRST)

Qudejan (Persian: قودجان) (Note: Also romanized as Qud Jān and Qūdejān; also known as Kūjūn and Qūrjān) is a village in, and the capital of, Cheshmeh Sar Rural District in the Central District of Khansar County, Isfahan province, Iran.

== Demographics ==
=== Language ===
The town is about 51% Azeri Turkic being the prominent heritage language and about 49% standard Farsi speaking.

=== Population ===
At the time of the 2006 National Census, the village's population was 865 in 306 households. The following census in 2011 counted 1,646 people in 518 households. The 2016 census measured the population of the village as 1,472 people in 489 households.

== Notable people ==
Mohammad Hossein Esheni Qudejani, Shia cleric
