= Rahmatabad, Khansar =

Village in Isfahan province, Iran

Rahmatabad Persian: رحمت اباد
- Village
- Location within Iran
- Coordinates: 33°12′04″N 50°35′43″E
- Country: Iran
- Province: Isfahan
- County: Khansar
- District: Central
- Rural District: Kuhsar

Population (2016)
  - Total: 749
- Time zone: UTC+3:30 (IRST)

Rahmatabad (Persian: رحمت اباد) (Note: Also romanized as Raḩmatābād) is a village in, and the capital of, Kuhsar Rural District in the Central District of Khansar County, Isfahan province, Iran.

== Demographics ==
=== Population ===
At the time of the 2006 National Census, the village's population was 817 in 304 households. The following census in 2011 counted 697 people in 289 households. The 2016 census measured the population of the village as 749 people in 310 households.
