= Adib Khansari =

Iranian musician (1901–1982)

Adib Khansari (Persian: ادیب خوانساری), born Esmaeil Khansari (Persian: اسماعیل خوانساری; 1901 – 25 January 1982), was an Iranian musician.

== Biography ==
Khansari began studying music as a child in Khansar; his first music teacher was Andalib Golpaygani. When he was 18, he moved to Isfahan.

In 1921, he was a student of Ney player Nayeb Asadollah. He also traveled to Bakhtiari provinces to research the music of the Lori people.

In 1924, he moved to Tehran to study under Hossein Taher Zadeh and Hossein Esmaeil Zadeh. While in Tehran, he studied the piano with Morteza Mahjoubi. After the foundation of Tehran radio station in 1940, he was invited to be one of the artists in this organization. The community of Barbad was established by close co-operation between Khansari and Esmaeil Mehrtash, as a place for theatre and music.
