= Jovin =

Jovin may refer to:

- Jovin Bedic (born 1990), Filipino footballer
- Milan Jovin (born 1955), Serbian footballer
- Suzanne Jovin (1977–1998), Yale University student murdered in 1998
- Jovin, Iran (disambiguation), villages in Iran
- Jovin Wandera (a Ugandan swimmer)
