= Qomik =

Qomik (Persian: قُميك) may refer to:

- Qom Yek-e Kuchak
- Qomik-e Bozorg
