= Saidabad, Buin Zahra =

Village in Qazvin province, Iran

Saidabad Persian: سعيداباد
- Village
- Location within Iran
- Coordinates: 36°02′14″N 49°49′00″E
- Country: Iran
- Province: Qazvin
- County: Buin Zahra
- District: Dashtabi
- Rural District: Dashtabi-ye Gharbi

Population (2016)
  - Total: 1,465
- Time zone: UTC+3:30 (IRST)

Saidabad (Persian: سعيداباد) (Note: Also romanized as Sa‘īdābād) is a village in Dashtabi-ye Gharbi Rural District of Dashtabi District in Buin Zahra County, Qazvin province, Iran.

== Demographics ==
=== Population ===
At the time of the 2006 National Census, the village's population was 1,318 in 327 households. The following census in 2011 counted 1,563 people in 456 households. The 2016 census measured the population of the village as 1,465 people in 452 households. It was the most populous village in its rural district.
