= Jameh Mosque of Khansar =

Shi'ite mosque in Isfahan province, Iran

Jāmeh Mosque of Khansar
- مسجد جامع خوانسار
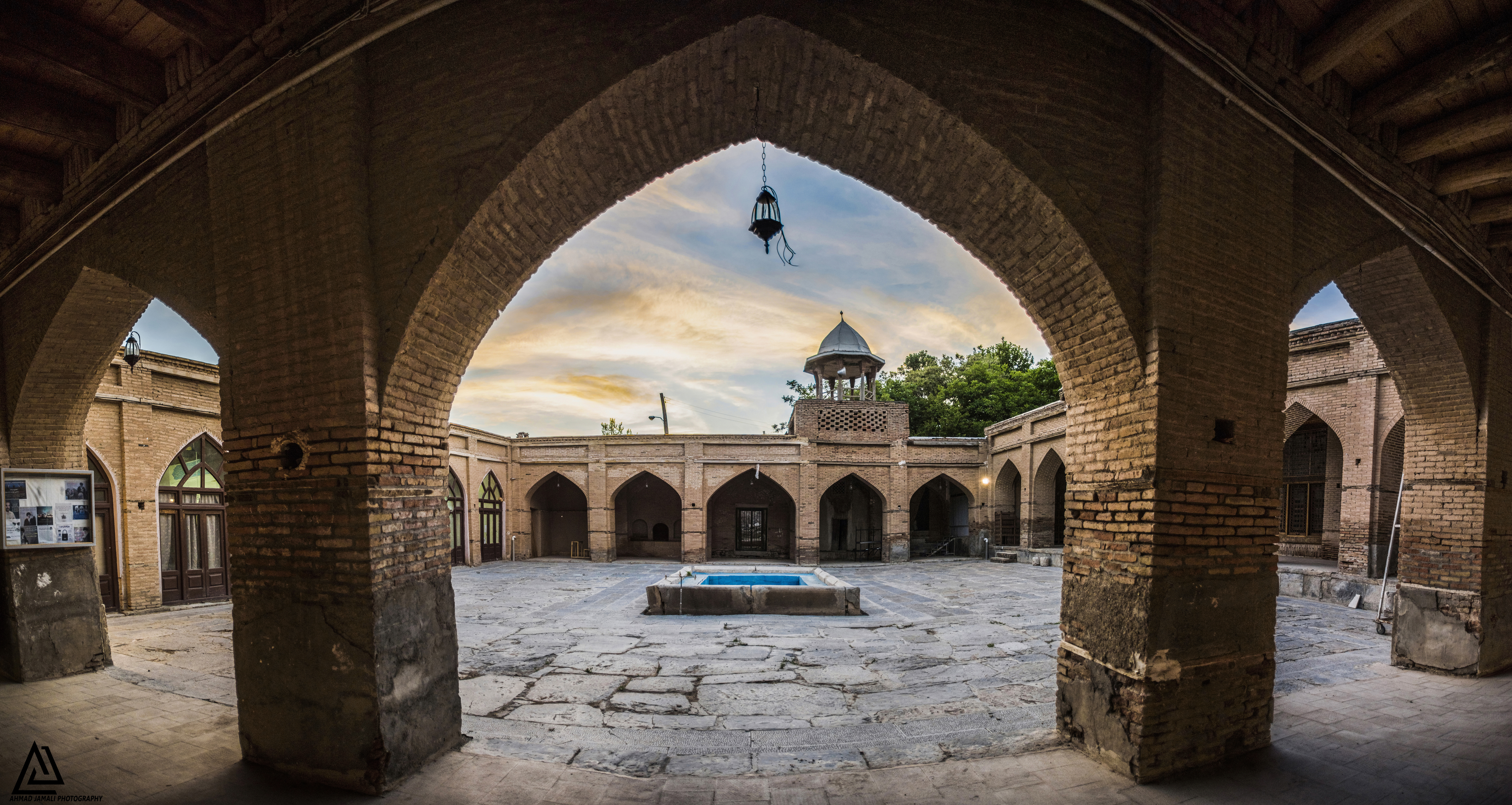
- The mosque sahn in 2017

- Location of the mosque in Iran

Religion
- Affiliation: Shia Islam
- Ecclesiastical or organizational status: Friday mosque
- Status: Active

Location
- Location: Khansar, Isfahan province
- Country: Iran
- Interactive map of Jāmeh Mosque of Khansar
- Coordinates: 33°12′58″N 50°19′16″E

Architecture
- Type: Mosque architecture
- Style: Safavid
- Completed: 12th century CE
- Minaret: One

Iran National Heritage List
- Official name: Jāmeh Mosque of Khansar
- Type: Built
- Designated: 1 November 1975
- Reference no.: 1121
- Conservation organization: Cultural Heritage, Handicrafts and Tourism Organization of Iran

The Jāmeh Mosque of Khansar (Persian: مسجد جامع خوانسار; Arabic: جامع خوانسار) is a Shi'ite Friday mosque (jāmeh), located near the entrance of the city of Khansar, (Note: Sometimes spelled as Khvansar.) adjacent to the old cemetery, in the province of Isfahan, Iran.

The mosque was completed during the 12th-century and was added to the Iran National Heritage List on 1 November 1975, administered by the Cultural Heritage, Handicrafts and Tourism Organization of Iran.

== Overview ==
The structure of the mosque does not feature a dome and includes a single minaret. Masjed Jameh, as the mosque is known in Persian, is located in the southeast of Khansar. Built during the Safavid era, it features exceptional plasterwork and fretwork. The mosque’s unique and serene architecture adds to its historical appeal. The ceiling of the mosque is constructed using wood posts.

== See also ==
- Shia Islam in Iran
- List of mosques in Iran
- List of historical structures in Isfahan province
