= Qom Yek-e Kuchak =

Qom Yek-e Kuchak قميك كوچك
- Village
- Location within Iran
- Coordinates: 36°07′13″N 49°55′45″E
- Country: Iran
- Province: Qazvin
- County: Buin Zahra
- Bakhsh: Dashtabi
- Rural District: Dashtabi-ye Sharqi

Population (2006)
  - Total: 120
- Time zone: UTC+3:30 (IRST)
  - Summer (DST): UTC+4:30 (IRDT)

Qom Yek-e Kuchak (Persian: قميك كوچك, also Romanized as Qom Yek-e Kūchak; also known as Qomīk) is a village in Dashtabi-ye Sharqi Rural District, Dashtabi District, Buin Zahra County, Qazvin Province, Iran. At the 2006 census, its population was 120, in 31 families.
