= Tidjan =

Village in Isfahan province, Iran

Tidjan Persian: تيدجان
- Village
- Location within Iran
- Coordinates: 33°17′58″N 50°19′46″E
- Country: Iran
- Province: Isfahan
- County: Khansar
- District: Central
- Rural District: Cheshmeh Sar

Population (2016)
  - Total: 411
- Time zone: UTC+3:30 (IRST)

Tidjan (Persian: تيدجان) (Note: Also romanized as Tīdjān; also known as Bīd Jān, Tūjūn, and Tūrjān) is a village in Cheshmeh Sar Rural District of the Central District in Khansar County, Isfahan province, Iran.

== Demographics ==
=== Population ===
At the time of the 2006 National Census, the village's population was 515 in 175 households. The following census in 2011 counted 487 people in 155 households. The 2016 census measured the population of the village as 411 people in 149 households.
