= Kahart =

Village in Isfahan province, Iran

Kahart Persian: كهرت
- Village
- Location within Iran
- Coordinates: 33°19′30″N 50°08′42″E
- Country: Iran
- Province: Isfahan
- County: Khansar
- District: Central
- Rural District: Golsar

Population (2016)
  - Total: 424
- Time zone: UTC+3:30 (IRST)

Kahart (Persian: كهرت) (Note: Also romanized as Kahrt; also known as Kamart, Kert, and Khirt) is a village in Golsar Rural District (Note: Formerly Poshtkuh Rural District) of the Central District in Khansar County, Isfahan province, Iran.

== Demographics ==
=== Population ===
At the time of the 2006 National Census, the village's population was 512 in 157 households. The following census in 2011 counted 536 people in 172 households. The 2016 census measured the population of the village as 424 people in 148 households.
