= Shared, Iran =

Village in Qazvin province, Iran

Shared Persian: شارد
- Village
- Location within Iran
- Coordinates: 36°00′14″N 49°53′31″E
- Country: Iran
- Province: Qazvin
- County: Buin Zahra
- District: Dashtabi
- Rural District: Dashtabi-ye Gharbi

Population (2016)
  - Total: 948
- Time zone: UTC+3:30 (IRST)

Shared (Persian: شارد) (Note: Also romanized as Shāred) is a village in Dashtabi-ye Gharbi Rural District of Dashtabi District in Buin Zahra County, Qazvin province, Iran.

== Demographics ==
=== Population ===
At the time of the 2006 National Census, the village's population was 973 in 238 households. The following census in 2011 counted 1,074 people in 316 households. The 2016 census measured the population of the village as 948 people in 310 households.
