= Movin =

Movin may refer to:

- Lisbeth Movin (1917–2011), Danish actress
- Movin, Iran or Mavin, a village in Iran
- Movin' (brand), a radio station brand used in the United States

== See also ==
- Moving (disambiguation)
