= Rahmatabad-e Kuchak =

Rahmatabad-e Kuchak رحمت ابادكوچك
- Village
- Location within Iran
- Coordinates: 36°04′37″N 49°56′32″E
- Country: Iran
- Province: Qazvin
- County: Buin Zahra
- Bakhsh: Dashtabi
- Rural District: Dashtabi-ye Sharqi

Population (2006)
  - Total: 118
- Time zone: UTC+3:30 (IRST)
  - Summer (DST): UTC+4:30 (IRDT)

Rahmatabad-e Kuchak (Persian: رحمت ابادكوچك, also Romanized as Raḩmatābād-e Kūchak; also known as Raḩmatābād) is a village in Dashtabi-ye Sharqi Rural District, Dashtabi District, Buin Zahra County, Qazvin Province, Iran. At the 2006 census, its population was 118, in 29 families.
