= Lia, Iran =

Village in Qazvin province, Iran

Lia Persian: ليا
- Village
- Location within Iran
- Coordinates: 36°05′14″N 50°01′47″E
- Country: Iran
- Province: Qazvin
- County: Buin Zahra
- District: Dashtabi
- Rural District: Dashtabi-ye Sharqi

Population (2016)
  - Total: 1,169
- Time zone: UTC+3:30 (IRST)

Lia (Persian: ليا) (Note: Also romanized as Līā, Līā’, and Liya) is a village in Dashtabi-ye Sharqi Rural District of Dashtabi District in Buin Zahra County, Qazvin province, Iran.

== Demographics ==
=== Population ===
At the time of the 2006 National Census, the village's population was 1,087 in 266 households. The following census in 2011 counted 1,130 people in 315 households. The 2016 census measured the population of the village as 1,169 people in 351 households.
