= Zoleykha =

Village in Qazvin province, Iran

Zoleykha Persian: زليخا
- Village
- Location within Iran
- Coordinates: 36°03′23″N 50°01′43″E
- Country: Iran
- Province: Qazvin
- County: Buin Zahra
- District: Dashtabi
- Rural District: Dashtabi-ye Sharqi

Population (2016)
  - Total: 384
- Time zone: UTC+3:30 (IRST)

Zoleykha (Persian: زليخا) (Note: Also romanized as Zoleykhā) is a village in Dashtabi-ye Sharqi Rural District of Dashtabi District in Buin Zahra County, Qazvin province, Iran.

== Demographics ==
=== Population ===
At the time of the 2006 National Census, the village's population was 387 in 98 households. The following census in 2011 counted 427 people in 124 households. The 2016 census measured the population of the village as 384 people in 124 households.
