= Shahin Tappeh =

Village in Qazvin province, Iran

Shahin Tappeh Persian: شاهين تپه
- Village
- Location within Iran
- Coordinates: 36°05′58″N 49°53′32″E
- Country: Iran
- Province: Qazvin
- County: Buin Zahra
- District: Dashtabi
- Rural District: Dashtabi-ye Sharqi

Population (2016)
  - Total: 2,440
- Time zone: UTC+3:30 (IRST)

Shahin Tappeh (Persian: شاهين تپه) (Note: Also romanized as Shāhīn Tappeh; also known as Shān Tappeh, Shan-Teppe, and Shantepe) is a village in Dashtabi-ye Sharqi Rural District of Dashtabi District in Buin Zahra County, Qazvin province, Iran.

== Demographics ==
=== Population ===
At the time of the 2006 National Census, the village's population was 2,402 in 476 households. The following census in 2011 counted 2,332 people in 651 households. The 2016 census measured the population of the village as 2,440 people in 738 households. It was the most populous village in its rural district.
