= Suliqan =

Village in Qazvin province, Iran

Suliqan Persian: سوليقان
- Village
- Location within Iran
- Coordinates: 36°02′05″N 49°52′14″E
- Country: Iran
- Province: Qazvin
- County: Buin Zahra
- District: Dashtabi
- Rural District: Dashtabi-ye Gharbi

Population (2016)
  - Total: 758
- Time zone: UTC+3:30 (IRST)

Suliqan (Persian: سوليقان) (Note: Also romanized as Sulīqān; also known as Amīn Āqān, Amīnābād, Aminagan, Amīnāghan, and Sūlīgān) is a village in Dashtabi-ye Gharbi Rural District of Dashtabi District in Buin Zahra County, Qazvin province, Iran.

== Demographics ==
=== Population ===
At the time of the 2006 National Census, the village's population was 672 in 155 households. The following census in 2011 counted 734 people in 221 households. The 2016 census measured the population of the village as 758 people in 241 households.
