= Shahrestanak, Qazvin =

Village in Qazvin province, Iran

Shahrestanak Persian: شهرستانك
- Village
- Location within Iran
- Coordinates: 36°04′53″N 49°58′10″E
- Country: Iran
- Province: Qazvin
- County: Buin Zahra
- District: Dashtabi
- Rural District: Dashtabi-ye Sharqi

Population (2016)
  - Total: 1,883
- Time zone: UTC+3:30 (IRST)

Shahrestanak (Persian: شهرستانك) (Note: Also romanized as Shahrestānak; also known as Shahristānak and Shakhrshtanak) is a village in, and the capital of, Dashtabi-ye Sharqi Rural District in Dashtabi District of Buin Zahra County, Qazvin province, Iran.

== Demographics ==
=== Ethnicity ===
The village is populated by Azerbaijanians.

=== Population ===
At the time of the 2006 National Census, the village's population was 1,564 in 404 households. The following census in 2011 counted 1,556 people in 418 households. The 2016 census measured the population of the village as 1,883 people in 553 households.
