= Shadmahan, Qazvin =

Village in Qazvin province, Iran

Shadmahan Persian: شادمهان
- Village
- Location within Iran
- Coordinates: 36°03′21″N 49°51′52″E
- Country: Iran
- Province: Qazvin
- County: Buin Zahra
- District: Dashtabi
- Rural District: Dashtabi-ye Gharbi

Population (2016)
  - Total: 736
- Time zone: UTC+3:30 (IRST)

Shadmahan (Persian: شادمهان) (Note: Also romanized as Shādmahān; also known as Shadman, also romanized as Shādmān) is a village in Dashtabi-ye Gharbi Rural District of Dashtabi District in Buin Zahra County, Qazvin province, Iran.

== Demographics ==
=== Population ===
At the time of the 2006 National Census, the village's population was 736 in 161 households. The following census in 2011 counted 811 people in 218 households. The 2016 census measured the population of the village as 736 people in 227 households.
