= Kavand, Qazvin =

Kavand كوند
- Village
- Location within Iran
- Coordinates: 36°03′06″N 49°54′18″E
- Country: Iran
- Province: Qazvin
- County: Buin Zahra
- Bakhsh: Dashtabi
- Rural District: Dashtabi-ye Gharbi

Population (2006)
  - Total: 98
- Time zone: UTC+3:30 (IRST)
  - Summer (DST): UTC+4:30 (IRDT)

Kavand (Persian: كوند, also Romanized as Kawand) is a village in Dashtabi-ye Gharbi Rural District, Dashtabi District, Buin Zahra County, Qazvin Province, Iran. At the 2006 census, its population was 98, in 27 families.
