= Aqa Baba =

Aqa Baba or Aka-Baba (Persian: اقابابا) may refer to:

- Aqa Baba, Buin Zahra
- Aqa Baba, Qazvin
- Aqa Baba-ye Faramarzi
