= Hoseynabad-e Amini =

Village in Qazvin province, Iran

Hoseynabad-e Amini Persian: حسین‌آباد امینی
- Village
- Location within Iran
- Coordinates: 36°08′12″N 49°53′05″E
- Country: Iran
- Province: Qazvin
- County: Buin Zahra
- District: Dashtabi
- Rural District: Dashtabi-ye Sharqi

Population (2016)
  - Total: 360
- Time zone: UTC+3:30 (IRST)

Hoseynabad-e Amini (Persian: حسین‌آباد امینی) (Note: Also romanized as Hosein Abad Amini, Ḩoseynābād Amīnī, and Ḩoseynābād-e Amīnī; also known as Gusainabad, Ḩoseynābād, and Husainābād) is a village in Dashtabi-ye Sharqi Rural District of Dashtabi District in Buin Zahra County, Qazvin province, Iran.

== Demographics ==
=== Population ===
At the time of the 2006 National Census, the village's population was 366 in 93 households. The following census in 2011 counted 335 people in 100 households. The 2016 census measured the population of the village as 360 people in 115 households.
