= Farkan, Qazvin =

Farkan فركان
- Village
- Country: Iran
- Province: Qazvin
- County: Buin Zahra
- Bakhsh: Dashtabi
- Rural District: Dashtabi-ye Gharbi

Population (2006)
  - Total: 32
- Time zone: UTC+3:30 (IRST)
  - Summer (DST): UTC+4:30 (IRDT)

Farkan (Persian: فركان, also Romanized as Farḵān) is a village in Dashtabi-ye Gharbi Rural District, Dashtabi District, Buin Zahra County, Qazvin Province, Iran. At the 2006 census, its population was 32, in 8 families.
