= Now Deh-e Lakvan =

Village in Qazvin province, Iran

Now Deh-e Lakvan Persian: نوده لكوان
- Village
- Location within Iran
- Coordinates: 36°01′19″N 49°55′49″E
- Country: Iran
- Province: Qazvin
- County: Buin Zahra
- District: Dashtabi
- Rural District: Dashtabi-ye Sharqi

Population (2016)
  - Total: 536
- Time zone: UTC+3:30 (IRST)

Now Deh-e Lakvan (Persian: نوده لكوان) (Note: Also romanized as Now Deh-e Lakvān, Now Deh-ye Lakvān, Nowdeh Lakvān, and Nowdeh-e Lakvān; also known as Nūdah and Nudakh) is a village in Dashtabi-ye Sharqi Rural District of Dashtabi District in Buin Zahra County, Qazvin province, Iran.

== Demographics ==
=== Population ===
At the time of the 2006 National Census, the village's population was 478 in 121 households. The following census in 2011 counted 568 people in 168 households. The 2016 census measured the population of the village as 536 people in 167 households.
