= Turjan, Iran =

Turjan (Persian: تورجان) in Iran may refer to:

- Turjan, Isfahan
- Turjan, Kurdistan
