= Farkan =

Farkan (Persian: فركان) may refer to:

- Farkan, Kerman
- Farkan, Qazvin
