= Vajihabad, Qazvin =

Village in Qazvin province, Iran

Vajihabad Persian: وجيه اباد
- Village
- Location within Iran
- Coordinates: 36°04′48″N 50°00′35″E
- Country: Iran
- Province: Qazvin
- County: Buin Zahra
- District: Dashtabi
- Rural District: Dashtabi-ye Sharqi

Population (2016)
  - Total: 389
- Time zone: UTC+3:30 (IRST)

Vajihabad (Persian: وجيه اباد) (Note: Also romanized as Vajīhābād) is a village in Dashtabi-ye Sharqi Rural District of Dashtabi District in Buin Zahra County, Qazvin province, Iran.

== Demographics ==
=== Population ===
At the time of the 2006 National Census, the village's population was 456 in 100 households. The following census in 2011 counted 413 people in 113 households. The 2016 census measured the population of the village as 389 people in 112 households.
