= Jovain, Iran =

Jovin or Joveyn or Jowin or Jowain (Persian: جوين) may refer to:

- Jovin, Qazvin
- Jovin, Semnan
- Joveyn County, in Razavi Khorasan Province

== See also ==
- Juvayni, a Persian surname
- Juvayni family, a Persian family native from Juvayn in Khorasan
- Bala Joveyn Rural District
- Miyan Joveyn Rural District
- Pain Joveyn Rural District
