= Dizan, Qazvin =

Village in Qazvin province, Iran

Dizan Persian: ديزان
- Village
- Location within Iran
- Coordinates: 36°01′01″N 49°52′53″E
- Country: Iran
- Province: Qazvin
- County: Buin Zahra
- District: Dashtabi
- Rural District: Dashtabi-ye Gharbi

Population (2016)
  - Total: 530
- Time zone: UTC+3:30 (IRST)

Dizan (Persian: ديزان) (Note: Also romanized as Dīzān; also known as Tezān) is a village in Dashtabi-ye Gharbi Rural District of Dashtabi District in Buin Zahra County, Qazvin province, Iran. The majority of the villagers' income is from raisin production.

== Demographics ==
=== Population ===
At the time of the 2006 National Census, the village's population was 393 in 102 households. The following census in 2011 counted 448 people in 122 households. The 2016 census measured the population of the village as 530 people in 169 households.
