= Jowharin =

Village in Qazvin province, Iran

Jowharin Persian: جوهرين
- Village
- Location within Iran
- Coordinates: 36°00′58″N 49°48′46″E
- Country: Iran
- Province: Qazvin
- County: Buin Zahra
- District: Dashtabi
- Rural District: Dashtabi-ye Gharbi

Population (2016)
  - Total: 784
- Time zone: UTC+3:30 (IRST)

Jowharin (Persian: جوهرين) (Note: Also romanized as Jowharīn) is a village in Dashtabi-ye Gharbi Rural District of Dashtabi District in Buin Zahra County, Qazvin province, Iran.

== Demographics ==
=== Population ===
At the time of the 2006 National Census, the village's population was 653 in 173 households. The following census in 2011 counted 799 people in 213 households. The 2016 census measured the population of the village as 784 people in 237 households.
