= Zubon =

Zubon may refer to:

- Zubon, a Japanese gairaigo and wasei-eigo term meaning trousers or pants
- Zubon, trousers of the keikogi uniform for the Japanese martial arts
- Col Mike Zubon, military assistant to the Chief Scientist of the United States Air Force from 1962 to 1966

== See also ==
- Jupon, Japanese garment
- Jubon, Qazvin, a village in Iran
