= Cheshmeh Sar Rural District =

Rural district in Isfahan province, Iran

Cheshmeh Sar Rural District Persian: دهستان چشمه سار
- Rural District
- Location within Iran
- Coordinates: 33°14′N 50°23′E
- Country: Iran
- Province: Isfahan
- County: Khansar
- District: Central
- Capital: Qudejan

Population (2016)
  - Total: 4,098
- Time zone: UTC+3:30 (IRST)

Cheshmeh Sar Rural District (Persian: دهستان چشمه سار) is in the Central District of Khansar County, Isfahan province, Iran. Its capital is the village of Qudejan.

== Demographics ==
=== Population ===
At the time of the 2006 National Census, the rural district's population was 3,832 in 1,137 households. There were 4,426 inhabitants in 1,359 households at the following census of 2011. The 2016 census measured the population of the rural district as 4,098 in 1,345 households. The most populous of its 21 villages was Dushkharat, with 1,526 people.

=== Other villages in the rural district ===
- Estakhr-e Pahn
- Layjand
- Qaleh-ye Baba Mohammad
- Safadasht
- Sang-e Sefid
- Tidjan
