= Ahmad Khansari =

Iranian cleric and judge

Haj Seyyed Ahmad Khansari (1891–1950/51), son of Seyyed Yusef Khansari, was one of the conspicuous jurisprudents.

He was born in a religious family in Khansar City on August 24, 1891 (18th Moharam 1309 AH). He studied Mathematics, Primary Sciences and Seminary lectures in Khansar. To continue his studies he went to Isfahan. His teachers were his great brother "Ayatollah Seyyed Hasan Khansari", Seyyed Mohammad Sadiq Isfahani, Mullah Abdul Karim Gazi, and Mirza Mohammad Ali Toyserkani. He was an expert in medicine, physics, algebra, geometry, astronomy, philosophy, law, metaphysics and metascience. After establishment of Qom Seminary by Ayatollah Haeri, according to his invitation, Haj Seyyed Ahmad Khansari left Isfahan for Qom to teach in the Seminary there. While there, he was considered as a high degree teacher. In Qom Seminary, he taught Theology, Philosophy and Mathematics. Only some of his students, such as Ayatollah Hossein-Ali Montazeri, had the opportunity to learn about explicit sciences mentioned above, and the majority of his students studied jurisprudence in his public lectures. In 1370 AH (Gregorian calendar: October 13, 1950 – October 1, 1951), when Haj Yahya Sajadi died, he went to Tehran according to Ayatollah Boroujerdi's request. In Tehran, he stayed in Sayyed Azizulallah Mosque.

He has a book titled Jame'ol Madarek fy sharhe mokhtasare nafee in 14 volumes written in Arabic. The most prominent aspect of this book is its association with the new look of Shiat at playing chess. When Ayatollah Khomeini gave Fatwa on the freedom for playing chess, there was an outrage of contradictory ideas among Shiat jurisprudents, based on more than 1000 years history of chess prohibition. Ayatollah Khomeini referred to Jame'ol Madarek for his Fatwa, and chess was considered sound (Halal) to play after more than 1,000 years among Shiat Muslims. There are other books claimed to be written by Ayatollah Haj Seyyed Ahmad Khansari; however, these were published after his death against his will. Therefore, some believe that these books have been modified from their original versions.

He entered in 1342 events along with other jurisprudents. He was injured by police and security officers during a demonstration in Tehran Bazaar. After Ayatollah Boroujerdi's death, many Muslims of Iran and other countries referred to him and selected him as their religious leader. His scientific popularity was clear for every one and Najaf jurisprudents respected him.

== Selected works ==
- An explanation on Orvatulvosgha
- An explanation on Haj rituals
- An Epistle on Persian and Arabic language
- An Epistle on Haj rituals
