= Kuhsar Rural District (Khansar County) =

Rural district in Isfahan province, Iran

Kuhsar Rural District Persian: دهستان كوهسار
- Rural District
- Location within Iran
- Coordinates: 33°13′N 50°32′E
- Country: Iran
- Province: Isfahan
- County: Khansar
- District: Central
- Established: 1990
- Capital: Rahmatabad

Population (2016)
  - Total: 2,641
- Time zone: UTC+3:30 (IRST)

Kuhsar Rural District (Persian: دهستان كوهسار) is in the Central District of Khansar County, Isfahan province, Iran. Its capital is the village of Rahmatabad.

== Demographics ==
=== Population ===
At the time of the 2006 National Census, the rural district's population was 2,725 in 916 households. There were 2,448 inhabitants in 877 households at the following census of 2011. The 2016 census measured the population of the rural district as 2,641 in 975 households. The most populous of its 17 villages was Kham Pich, with 1,414 people.

=== Other villages in the rural district ===
- Hajj Bolagh
- Mehrabad
- Tajareh
