= Ardaq =

City in Qazvin province, Iran

Ardaq Persian: ارداق
- City
- Location within Iran
- Coordinates: 36°03′11″N 49°49′25″E
- Country: Iran
- Province: Qazvin
- County: Buin Zahra
- District: Dashtabi
- Established as a city: 2002

Population (2016)
  - Total: 5,043
- Time zone: UTC+3:30 (IRST)

Ardaq (Persian: ارداق) (Note: Also known as Aradagh, Ardak, and Engel) is a city in, and the capital of, Dashtabi District of Buin Zahra County, Qazvin province, Iran. It also serves as the administrative center for Dashtabi-ye Gharbi Rural District. The village of Ardaq was converted to a city in 2002 and is the center of kilim weaving in the province.

== Demographics ==
=== Language ===
The common language in this city is Azerbaijani Turkish.

=== Population ===
At the time of the 2006 National Census, the city's population was 4,832 in 1,262 households. The following census in 2011 counted 5,123 people in 1,468 households. The 2016 census measured the population of the city as 5,043 people in 1,596 households.

== Notable people ==
Qazi Ardaghi was born in Ardaq.
