= Aqa Baba, Buin Zahra =

Village in Qazvin province, Iran

Aqa Baba Persian: اقابابا
- Village
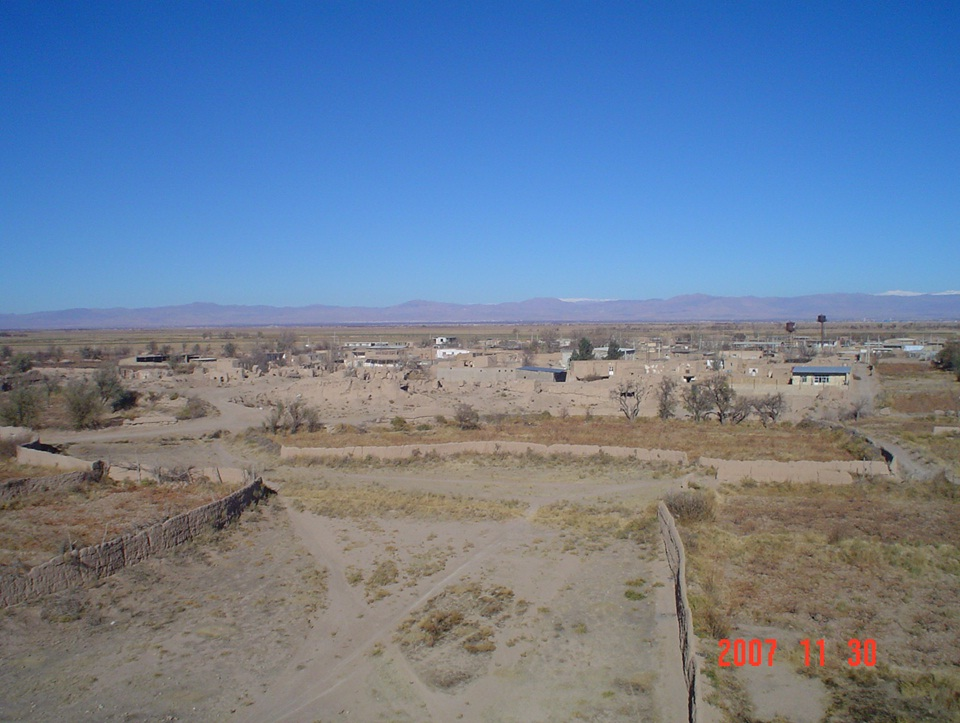
- The village of Aqa Baba

- Location within Iran
- Coordinates: 36°04′42″N 49°57′21″E
- Country: Iran
- Province: Qazvin
- County: Buin Zahra
- District: Dashtabi
- Rural District: Dashtabi-ye Sharqi

Population (2016)
  - Total: 763
- Time zone: UTC+3:30 (IRST)

Aqa Baba (Persian: اقابابا) (Note: Also romanized as Āqā Bābā; also known as Aka-Baba) is a village in Dashtabi-ye Sharqi Rural District of Dashtabi District in Buin Zahra County, Qazvin province, Iran.

== Demographics ==
=== Language ===
The majority of the population of this village is Azerbaijani Turks.

=== Population ===
At the time of the 2006 National Census, the village's population was 634 in 157 households. The following census in 2011 counted 732 people in 212 households. The 2016 census measured the population of the village as 763 people in 222 households.
