= Jovin, Qazvin =

Jovin جوين
- Village
- Location within Iran
- Coordinates: 36°00′17″N 49°51′00″E
- Country: Iran
- Province: Qazvin
- County: Buin Zahra
- Bakhsh: Dashtabi
- Rural District: Dashtabi-ye Gharbi

Population (2006)
  - Total: 412
- Time zone: UTC+3:30 (IRST)
  - Summer (DST): UTC+4:30 (IRDT)

Jovin (Persian: جوين, also Romanized as Jovīn, Jowīn, and Joveyn; also known as Gūyak, Gūyīk, Guyyak, and Jūbon) is a village in Dashtabi-ye Gharbi Rural District, Dashtabi District, Buin Zahra County, Qazvin Province, Iran. At the 2006 census, its population was 412, in 96 families.
