= Mavin, Qazvin =

Village in Qazvin province, Iran

Mavin Persian: موين
- Village
- Location within Iran
- Coordinates: 36°05′26″N 49°55′42″E
- Country: Iran
- Province: Qazvin
- County: Buin Zahra
- District: Dashtabi
- Rural District: Dashtabi-ye Sharqi

Population (2016)
  - Total: 550
- Time zone: UTC+3:30 (IRST)

Mavin (Persian: موين) (Note: Also romanized as Mavīn, Māwin, and Movīn) is a village in Dashtabi-ye Sharqi Rural District of Dashtabi District in Buin Zahra County, Qazvin province, Iran.

== Demographics ==
=== Population ===
At the time of the 2006 National Census, the village's population was 553 in 133 households. The following census in 2011 counted 614 people in 170 households. The 2016 census measured the population of the village as 550 people in 166 households.
