= Rahmatabad-e Bozorg =

Village in Qazvin province, Iran

Rahmatabad-e Bozorg Persian: رحمت ابادبزرگ
- Village
- Location within Iran
- Coordinates: 36°07′32″N 49°50′12″E
- Country: Iran
- Province: Qazvin
- County: Buin Zahra
- District: Dashtabi
- Rural District: Dashtabi-ye Gharbi

Population (2016)
  - Total: 1,233
- Time zone: UTC+3:30 (IRST)

Rahmatabad-e Bozorg (Persian: رحمت ابادبزرگ) (Note: Also romanized as Raḩmatābād-e Bozorg; also known as Raḩmatābād) is a village in Dashtabi-ye Gharbi Rural District of Dashtabi District in Buin Zahra County, Qazvin province, Iran.

== Demographics ==
=== Population ===
At the time of the 2006 National Census, the village's population was 1,283 in 344 households. The following census in 2011 counted 1,246 people in 387 households. The 2016 census measured the population of the village as 1,233 people in 381 households.
