= Golsar Rural District =

Rural district in Isfahan province, Iran

Golsar Rural District Persian: دهستان گلسار
- Rural District
- Location within Iran
- Coordinates: 33°20′N 50°10′E
- Country: Iran
- Province: Isfahan
- County: Khansar
- District: Central
- Established: 1987
- Capital: Arjanak

Population (2016)
  - Total: 4,427
- Time zone: UTC+3:30 (IRST)

Golsar Rural District (Persian: دهستان گلسار) (Note: Formerly Poshtkuh Rural District (دهستان پشتكوه)) is in the Central District of Khansar County, Isfahan province, Iran. Its capital is the village of Arjanak. The previous capital of the rural district was the village of Vist, now a city.

== Demographics ==
=== Population ===
At the time of the 2006 National Census, the rural district's population was 4,495 in 1,322 households. There were 4,211 inhabitants in 1,318 households at the following census of 2011. The 2016 census measured the population of the rural district as 4,427 in 1,511 households. The most populous of its 10 villages was Vist (now a city), with 2,514 people.

=== Other villages in the rural district ===
- Hajjiabad
- Hasanabad
- Kahart
- Khoshk Rud
