= Rahmatabad-e Kataki =

Rahmatabad-e Kataki رحمت ابادكتكي
- Village
- Location within Iran
- Coordinates: 27°48′40″N 58°23′22″E
- Country: Iran
- Province: Kerman
- County: Rudbar-e Jonubi
- Bakhsh: Jazmurian
- Rural District: Jazmurian

Population (2006)
  - Total: 151
- Time zone: UTC+3:30 (IRST)
  - Summer (DST): UTC+4:30 (IRDT)

Rahmatabad-e Kataki (Persian: رحمت ابادكتكي, also Romanized as Raḩmatābād-e Katakī) is a village in Jazmurian Rural District, Jazmurian District, Rudbar-e Jonubi County, Kerman Province, Iran. At the 2006 census, its population was 151, in 27 families.
