= Juvayni =

Juvayni (Persian: جوینی), also spelled in English as Juwayni, Juvaini, or Joveini, is a Persian last name, meaning from the city of Juvayn in Khorasan, Iran. In the historical context, it may refer to these persons:

- Al-Juwayni (c. 1028–1085), Islamic theologian
- Ata-Malik Juvayni (1226–1283), Ala'iddin Ata-Malik Juvayni, Persian historian
- Shams ad-Din Juvayni (c. 1220s–1285), Persian government administrator, brother of Ata-Malik
- Qasim Khan Juvayni, Mughal general (died 1631)
