= Asian–African Legal Consultative Organization =

International governmental organization

AALCO
- Asian-African Legal Consultative Organization
- Headquarters: New Delhi, India
- Official language: English
- Secretary General: Kamalinne Pinitpuvadol (Thailand)
- Website: Official website

The Asian–African Legal Consultative Organization (AALCO) is an international governmental organization formed in 1956, initially to serve as an advisory board to member states on matters on international law. It was an outgrowth of the Bandung Conference, held in Indonesia during April, 1955, which led to the establishment of the Asian Legal Consultative Committee (ALCC). In April, 1958, it changed its name to the Asian-African Legal Consultative Committee (AALCC) to reflect the growth of its membership beyond the African side of the United Arab Republic. Since 2001, it has been known by its current name, the AALCO, reflecting the growth of its international status; currently an intergovernmental organization having received a standing United Nations invitation to participate as an observer in the sessions and the work of the General Assembly and maintaining a permanent office at Headquarters.

In 2014, the AALCO established an Informal Expert Group on Customary International Law. That group adopted a set of comments on the work of the International Law Commission on identification of customary international law. Those comments and the report of the AALCO Special Rapporteur Sienho Yee are published on the website of the AALCO.

== AALCO Regional Centres for International Commercial Arbitration ==
One of the major achievements of AALCO in its programme in the economic field was the launching of its Integrated Scheme for Settlement of Disputes in the Economic and Commercial Transactions in 1978. Pursuant to that Scheme, it was decided to establish Regional Arbitration Centres under the auspices of AALCO, which would function as international institutions with the objectives to promote international commercial arbitration in the Asian-African regions and provide for conducting international arbitrations under these Centres. Five such Centres have been established so far, as below:

- Asian International Arbitration Centre (AIAC, formerly known as Kuala Lumpur Regional Centre for Arbitration), Malaysia
- Cairo Regional Centre for International Commercial Arbitration (CRCICA), Arab Republic of Egypt
- Regional Centre for International Commercial Arbitration Lagos (RCICAL), Nigeria
- Tehran Regional Arbitration Centre (TRAC), Islamic Republic of Iran
- Nairobi Centre for International Arbitration (NCIA), Nairobi, Republic of Kenya

The respective host Governments recognize their independent status like an international organization and have accorded privileges and immunities to these Centres. AALCO provides its expertise and assistance to its Member States in the appointment of arbitrators and other matters related to the conduct of arbitration. Its Centers provide the opportunities for training of arbitrators as well. The Directors of the Centres, who are from amongst lawyers familiar to arbitration, are appointed by suggestion of the host governments and ratification of the Secretary-General of AALCO. Directors of the Centres present their reports on the functioning of the Centres at the Annual Sessions of AALCO.

== List of AALCO Secretaries-General ==
- Barry Sen (1956–1987)
- Frank X. Njenga (1988–1994)
- TANG Chengyuan (1994–2000)
- Wafik Zaher Kamil (2000–2008)
- Rahmat Mohamad (2008–2016)
- Kennedy Gastorn (2016–2020)
- Kamalinne Pinitpuvadol (2021–present)

== Members ==
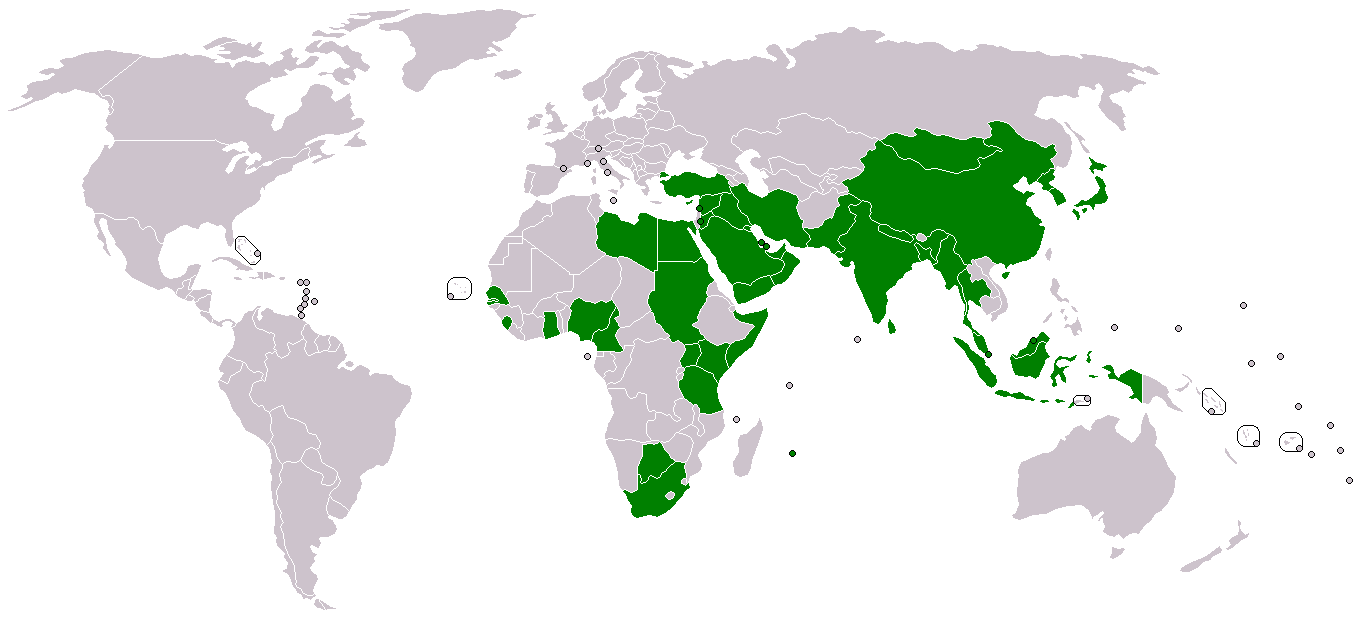
Asian–African Legal Consultative Organization member states

The current membership includes the following members, with founding members marked with an asterisk (*):

- Bahrain
- Bangladesh
- Brunei
- Burkina Faso
- Cameroon
- China
- Cyprus
- Djibouti
- Egypt* (founding member as United Arab Republic)
- The Gambia
- Ghana
- India*
- Indonesia*
- Iran
- Iraq*
- Japan*
- Jordan
- Kenya
- Kuwait
- Lebanon
- Libya
- Malaysia
- Mauritius
- Mongolia
- Myanmar*
- Nepal
- Nigeria
- North Korea
- Oman
- Pakistan
- Philippines
- Qatar
- Saudi Arabia
- Senegal
- Sierra Leone
- Singapore
- Somalia
- South Africa
- South Korea
- Sri Lanka*
- State of Palestine
- Sudan
- Syria* (founding member as United Arab Republic)
- Tanzania
- Thailand
- Turkey
- Uganda
- Viet Nam
- Yemen

=== Observers ===
- Australia
- New Zealand

=== Former members ===
- Botswana
- United Arab Emirates
