= Rahmat Mohamad =

Malaysian legal scholar

Yang Berbahagia Rahmat Mohamad DSAP JSM
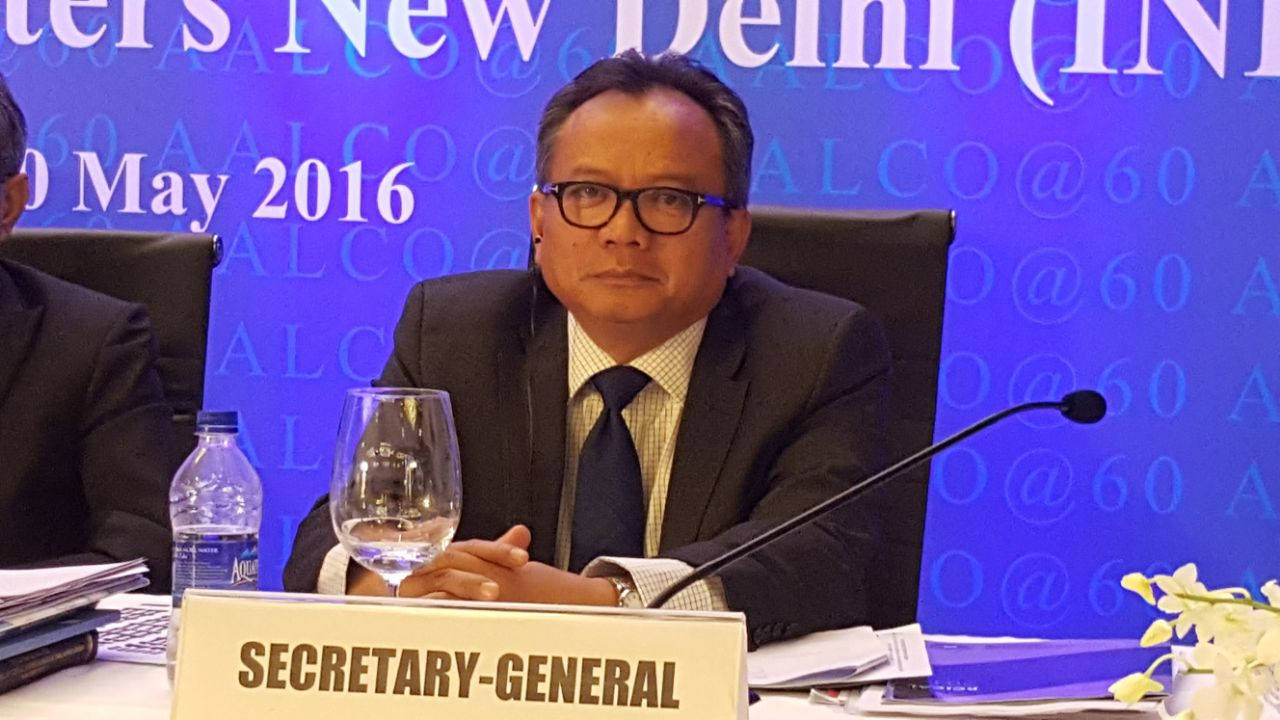
- Rahmat in 2016

Chairman Asian International Arbitration Centre
- In office August 2023 – August 2025

Chairman Human Rights Commission of Malaysia
- In office 2022–2023

Deputy Vice Chancellor (Industry, Community and Alumni Network) Universiti Teknologi MARA
- In office 2018–2021

Deputy Elections Officer International Union for Conservation of Nature
- In office 2021–2022

Secretary-General Asian–African Legal Consultative Organization
- In office 2008–2016

Chairman National Sports Institute of Malaysia
- In office 2019–2023

Personal details
- Born: 7 July 1960 (age 66) Johor, Malaysia
- Education: Aberystwyth University; University of Bristol; Institut Teknologi MARA

Rahmat bin Mohamad is a Malaysian legal scholar and an Emeritus Professor of Law at the Universiti Teknologi MARA. He is an Advocate and Solicitor of the High Court of Malaya and a member of the Malaysian Bar. He previously served as Chairman of the Asian International Arbitration Centre (AIAC). He also served as Chairman of the National Sports Institute of Malaysia from August 2019 to August 2023 and the Chairman of the Human Rights Commission of Malaysia (SUHAKAM) from August 2022 until August 2023.

Rahmat Mohamad held the position of Deputy Vice-Chancellor (Industry, Community and Alumni Network) of Universiti Teknologi MARA from November 2018 to November 2021. He has served Universiti Teknologi MARA in Shah Alam in various capacities since 1986. He served as the Assistant Vice Chancellor (Quality and Knowledge Advancement) (2003–2005), Deputy Vice Chancellor (Research and Innovation) (2005–2008), Assistant Vice Chancellor (Strategy) (2016) and Dean of Law Faculty (2017).

On 23 March 2021, on the recommendation of the Bureau and the candidates proposed by the International Union for Conservation of Nature (IUCN) World Commission on Environmental Law, the IUCN Council appointed Dr Nilufer Oral as the IUCN World Conservation Congress Elections Officer and Dr Rahmat Mohamad as the Deputy Elections Officer.

In July 2023, Rahmat Mohamad was conferred the title of Honorary Fellow by Aberystwyth University in the United Kingdom. Emeritus Professor John Williams of Aberystwyth University stated in the conferral presentation that:

... "Aberystwyth is proud of his achievements. He is one of the many Aberystwyth alumni from Malaysia who have significantly impacted politics, law, and society in Malaysia and beyond".

== Career at Universiti Teknologi MARA ==
Rahmat Mohamad served as the Deputy Vice Chancellor for Industry, Community, and Alumni at UiTM from 2018 to 2021. In this role, he was responsible for overseeing the university's connections with industry, community, and alumni networks. He worked on consolidating 45 alumni associations into a single body under the vice chancellor's leadership and fostered collaborations between the university and various industries. He also initiated sustainable community development programs and worked on preserving ecotourism initiatives in regions such as Keniam, Teluk Melano, and Sungai Tiang. Additionally, Rahmat led efforts to develop the university’s endowment strategy and transformed the Center for Industry, Community, and Alumni Networks into a data-driven entity through the implementation of the SMART integrated reporting system and an alumni portal. He also spearheaded the 'Kajian Impak 20 Tahun Penubuhan UiTM,' a study analyzing the university's contributions to Malaysia's socio-economic development.

From 2016 to 2017, Rahmat served as the Assistant Vice Chancellor for Strategy. His duties included advising the Vice Chancellor on university matters, strengthening relationships with stakeholders, and communicating the Vice Chancellor’s vision and strategies to the university leadership. He also played a role in formulating strategies related to the university’s political stance on Article 153.

Between 2005 and 2008, Rahmat held the position of Deputy Vice Chancellor for Research and Development. In this capacity, he was instrumental in securing research grants totaling RM1.5 million from the Ministry of Higher Education for projects in Taman Negara Kuala Keniam. He also established a group of Young Research Leaders at UiTM and oversaw the acquisition of the Kuala Keniam Research Station within Taman Negara Perhilitan. Furthermore, he managed research projects assessing the impact of activities in the Kuala Keniam area.

Earlier in his career, Rahmat was the founding Assistant Vice Chancellor of the Institute of Quality and Knowledge Advancement (INQKA) from 2003 to 2005. In this role, he was responsible for advancing the university’s quality agenda and overseeing ISO initiatives. He also founded the ASEAN Studies Centre and represented UiTM at ASEAN conferences hosted by the Ministry of Foreign Affairs. Additionally, Rahmat chaired and organized the ASEAN Civil Society Conference during the ASEAN Summit in Kuala Lumpur in 2005.

Rahmat also served as the Dean of the Law Faculty at UiTM from 2017 to 2018.

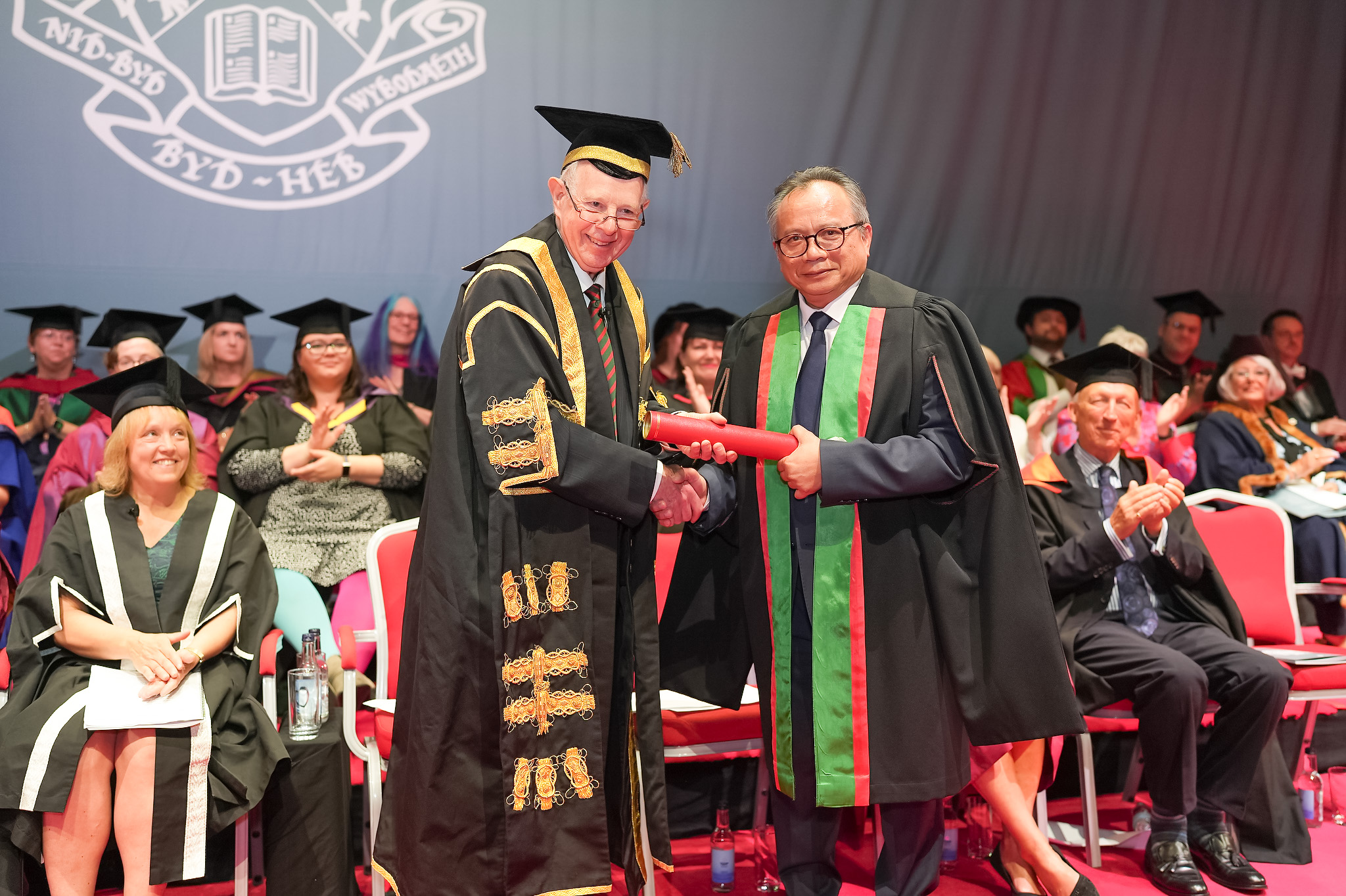
Rt Hon Lord Thomas of Cwmgïedd, Chancellor of Aberystwyth University, presenting Professor Dato' Dr Rahmat Mohamad as Honorary Fellow in 2023.

== Career at AALCO ==
Rahmat Mohamad served two terms as the Secretary-General of the Asian-African Legal Consultative Organization (AALCO) from 2008 to 2012 and again from 2012 to 2016. In 2016, he was appointed to AALCO's Eminent Person Group (EPG) in recognition of his eight years of service.

He became the fifth Secretary-General of AALCO on 20 June 2008, during the organization's 47th Annual Session in New Delhi, India, and was reappointed for a second term on 18 June 2012 at the 51st Annual Session in Abuja, Nigeria.

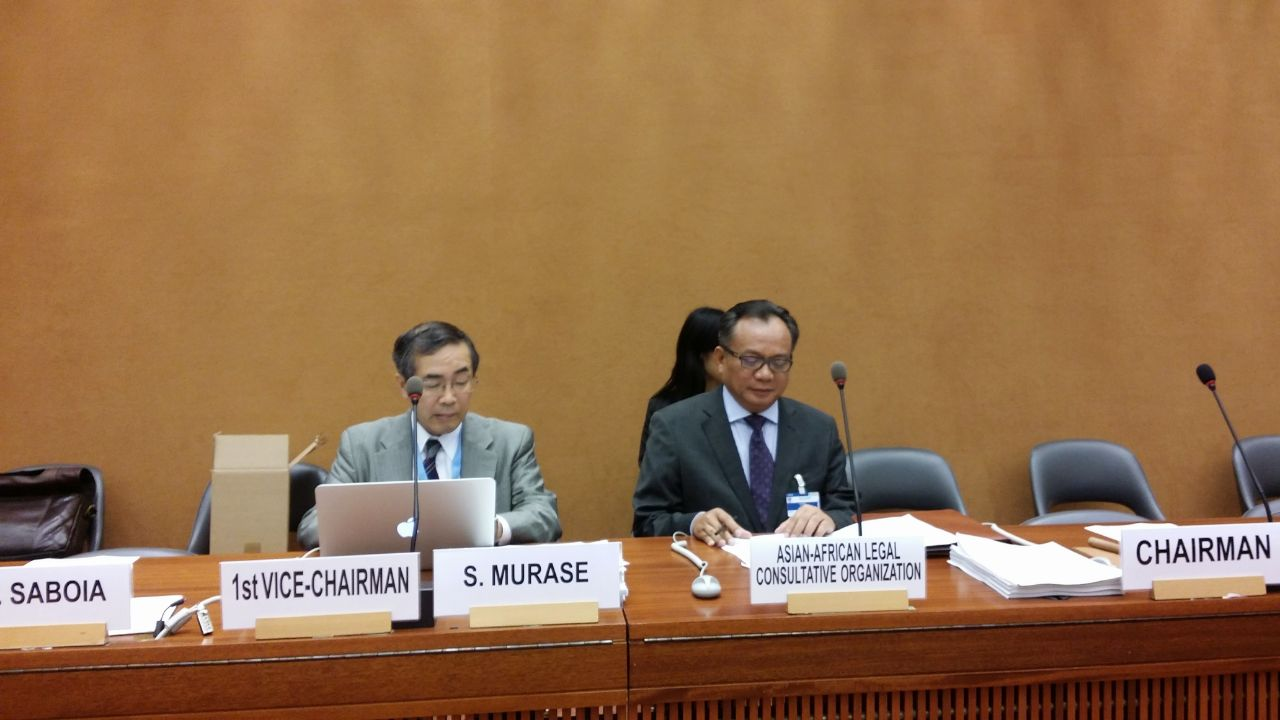
With the UN International Law Commission in Geneva.

Under his leadership, AALCO organized conferences on key topics such as the Law of the Sea, Climate Change, and Competition Law, and expanded its agenda to include emerging issues like International Law in Cyberspace, Marine Biodiversity, and the Legal Aspects of Violent Extremism. He also played a role in fostering academic engagement, delivering lectures at various institutions, and contributing to the publication of books and journals related to international law and the Asian-African perspective.

Additionally, Rahmat commissioned extensive research studies on topics of importance to AALCO and its Member States, including Unilateral and Secondary Sanctions, the Statehood of Palestine, Cyber-law, and Marine Biodiversity. He has been involved with the Rome Statute of the International Criminal Court (ICC) since 2008, contributing to research and organizing conferences, workshops, and seminars. One of his key contributions was his intervention at the Putrajaya ICC Dialogue in 2012, ahead of the First Review Conference in Kampala, Uganda.

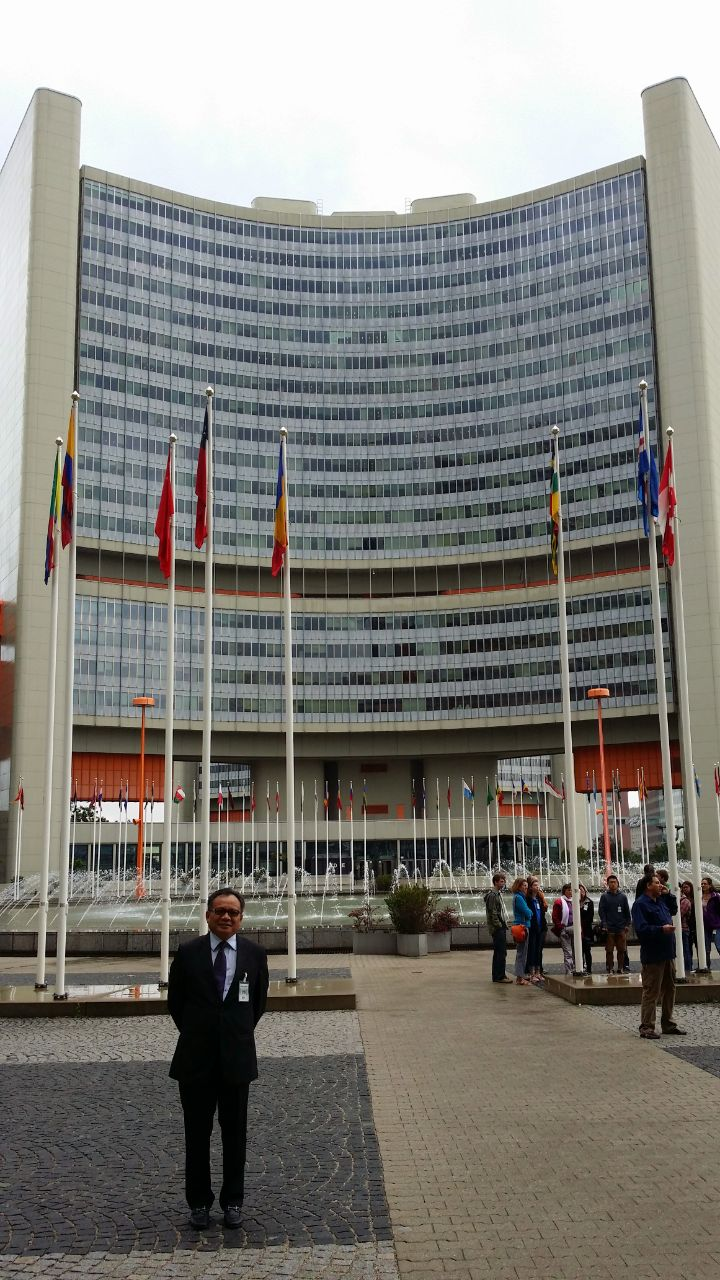
At the United Nations Office, Vienna.

Apart from his diplomatic role, he has written on diverse topics in public international law.

== Education ==
Rahmat Mohamad first studied law at Institut Teknologi MARA (now Universiti Teknologi MARA), Malaysia, earning a Diploma in Law and later an Advanced Diploma in Law in 1985. He then pursued postgraduate studies, obtaining an LL.M. in Commercial Law at the University of Bristol, England in 1986. He earned his Doctor of Philosophy in Law from the University of Aberystwyth, Wales in 2001 with a dissertation entitled "Dispute Settlement Mechanism in the ASEAN Free Trade Area (AFTA)".

== Capacity as Head of Delegation / Secretary-General of AALCO in the United Nations and Other Inter-Governmental Meetings ==
During his time as Secretary-General, Rahmat Mohamad represented AALCO Member States at various diplomatic conferences. He participated in the First Review Conference of the International Criminal Court (ICC) in Kampala, Uganda, and attended an informal meeting between AALCO and the UN International Law Commission (ILC) in Geneva on multiple occasions.

He delivered several significant speeches, including at the Third World Summit of Prosecutors in Bucharest, Romania, in March 2009, and during the Meeting of Legal Advisers from AALCO Member States and the Joint AALCO-ILC Meeting at the UN Headquarters in New York in October 2009.

Rahmat also took part in the General Debate at the Review Conference of the ICC Rome Statute in Kampala in June 2010, addressed the ILC at the UN Offices in Geneva in July 2010, and engaged in discussions on legal matters at the UN-AALCO Legal Advisers Meeting in New York in November 2010. In November 2010, he also spoke at a Workshop on Trafficking in Persons and Smuggling of Migrants in Putrajaya, Malaysia.

Further engagements included addressing the ILC in Geneva in 2012, attending the State Parties Assembly Meeting of the ICC in The Hague in November 2012, and presenting on the ILC’s work in Geneva in July 2014. He also participated as Head of Delegation at the Intergovernmental Committee on Intellectual Property and Genetic Resources at WIPO Headquarters in Geneva in July 2014.

Rahmat continued his involvement in various forums, including addressing the AALCO Legal Advisers Meeting in New York in October 2014, delivering a keynote speech at the AALCO Law of the Sea Expert Meeting in Putrajaya, Malaysia, in August 2015, and speaking on Customary International Law at the AALCO Informal Expert Group Meeting in Bangi later that year. He also chaired the AALCO–UNODC discussion on Cybercrime and International Law in Vienna, Austria, in May 2016.

== Publications (Books/Book Chapters) ==
Rahmat has authored numerous articles in journals, newspapers, book chapters, and books. These include:

1. Mohamad, R. & Aziz, A.A., A Dispute Settlement Mechanism for the ASEAN Free Trade Area (AFTA), Lexis Nexis – Malayan Law Journal (2004)
2. Mohamad, R. & Aziz, A.A., Understanding Dispute Settlement Mechanisms in the World Trading System: An Analysis of the Mechanism under the WTO, NAFTA and MERCOSUR, Lexis Nexis – Malayan Law Journal Publication (2004)
3. Mohamad, R, Asian African Perspectives on International Law in the Post Westphalian Era: Some Reflections. AALCO Publication, 2011
4. Secretary General's Handbook on Basic Entitlements and Obligations under the United Nations Law of the Sea Convention (UNCLOS) (2015)
5. Mohamad, R, Asian and African Views on International Law (2016): UiTM and KLRCA Joint Publication
6. Mohamad, R. (2005) “Dispute Settlement Mechanism in the Muslim World”. In International Trade and Finance in Muslim Countries, Kuala Lumpur, IKIM Publication
7. Mohamad, R & Rizal, A., (2006) “Preservation of Progeny: Issues from the Civil Law Perspectives”, In Genealogy and Preservation of the Progeny: An Islamic perspective, Kuala Lumpur, MPH Publication
8. Mohamad, R, (2009), “Bringing Together Asian African States in Harmonizing the International Legal Order in the Post Westphalian Era”. In Essays on Contemporary Essays on International Law, New Delhi, AALCO Publication, p. 7
9. Mohamad, R, (2011) “Towards a people-centric approach to global governance: Some preliminary reflections”. In AALCO@50: Some Reflections on International Law, New Delhi, AALCO Publication
10. Mohamad, R, Rowena Maguire, Bridget Lewis, Charles Sampford ed. (2013) ”The Role of the International Criminal Court and the Rome Statute in International Criminal Justice standard setting: some reflections”. In Shifting Global Powers and International Law: Challenges and Opportunities, London, Routledge, pp 100–115
11. Mohamad, R, Ali Z. Marossi, Marisa R. Bassett ed. (2014) Unilateral Sanctions in International Law: A Quest for its Legality. In Economic Sanctions under International Law: Unilateralism, Multilateralism, Legitimacy, and Consequences. The Hague, Springer/ASSER Institute Publication, The Hague, p. 71
12. Mohamad, R, Ahmad Y, Kikuchi and Popovski ed. (2014), Going Beyond ASEAN Regional Identity. In Building ASEAN Identity on a Transnational Dimension. Tokyo, United Nations University Publication, p. 67
13. Mohamad, R, (2015) “An Afro-Asian Perspective on the International Criminal Court”. In Historical Origins of International Criminal Law, Volume 4, FICHL Publication Series No. 23, pp729 – 748
14. Mohamad, R, “International Criminal Court in the Development of international rule of law: a reflection of Asian-African views, Charles Sampford and Ramesh Tahkur eds. (2015). In Institutional Supports for the International Rule of Law, London, Routledge, pp 59
15. Mohamad, R, Patrick Keyzer, Vesselin Popovski and Charles Sampford eds. (2015)”The Role of the International Criminal Court in Aiding National Prosecutions of International Crimes”. In Access to International Justice, London, Routledge, pp. 35–46
16. Mohamad R, Towards a global treaty on conversation and sustainability of marine Biodiversity in areas Beyond National jurisdiction (ABNJ) and Its Implication on ASEAN, in Developments in Malaysian law; Essays Commemorating 50 years of legal Education at UiTM, Sweet and Maxwell, 2018
