= Rahmatabad-e Salehiha =

Rahmatabad-e Salehiha رحمت ابادصالحي ها
- Village
- Location within Iran
- Coordinates: 29°48′25″N 55°35′44″E
- Country: Iran
- Province: Kerman
- County: Sirjan
- Bakhsh: Pariz
- Rural District: Pariz

Population (2006)
  - Total: 187
- Time zone: UTC+3:30 (IRST)
  - Summer (DST): UTC+4:30 (IRDT)

Rahmatabad-e Salehiha (Persian: رحمت ابادصالحي ها, also Romanized as Raḩmatābād-e Şāleḥīhā; also known as Raḩmatābād-e Do Chāhī) is a village in Pariz Rural District, Pariz District, Sirjan County, Kerman Province, Iran. At the 2006 census, its population was 187, in 48 families.
