= Lori people =

Lori
Regions with significant populations
- Pakistan: 68,000

Languages
- Saraiki

Religion
- Islam

Related ethnic groups
- Romani, Jamote, Saraiki

The Lori are a nomadic community found in the Pakistan. Originally from Sindh, the Lori migrated westward. They must not be confused with the Lurs, who are an entirely distinct people also living in Iran.

== Present circumstances ==
Traditionally, the Lori along with Darzada, Nakib, Lundi, Lutti, Behari/Bahari and Wardili were the minstrels, carpenters, tailors, and the blacksmiths. Each occupational group is distinguished by a special appellation. For example, the carpenter is known as (Dar tarash Lori) and the blacksmith is known as (Asinkar Lori). Further, groups involved in entertainment are known as (Dohli), or drummers, and are a strictly endogamous group. The dholi are also involved in jugglery, palmistry, and fortune telling. Historically, they were also the sellers of donkeys; however, this occupation has declined with the growth in modern transportation.

In the Kachhi region of Balochistan, the Lori live among the Jamote. Their traditional occupation was blacksmithing with many of the women employed as midwives. Most Lori of Kacchi also speak Saraiki.
