= Rahmatabad, Kangavar =

Rahmatabad رحمت اباد
- Village
- Location within Iran
- Coordinates: 34°35′02″N 48°02′05″E
- Country: Iran
- Province: Kermanshah
- County: Kangavar
- Bakhsh: Central
- Rural District: Gowdin

Population (2006)
  - Total: 706
- Time zone: UTC+3:30 (IRST)
  - Summer (DST): UTC+4:30 (IRDT)

Rahmatabad (Persian: رحمت اباد, also Romanized as Raḩmatābād) is a village in Gowdin Rural District, in the Central District of Kangavar County, Kermanshah Province, Iran. At the 2006 census, its population was 706, in 180 families.
