= Khansar, Iran =

City in Isfahan province, Iran

Khansar Persian: خوانسار
- City
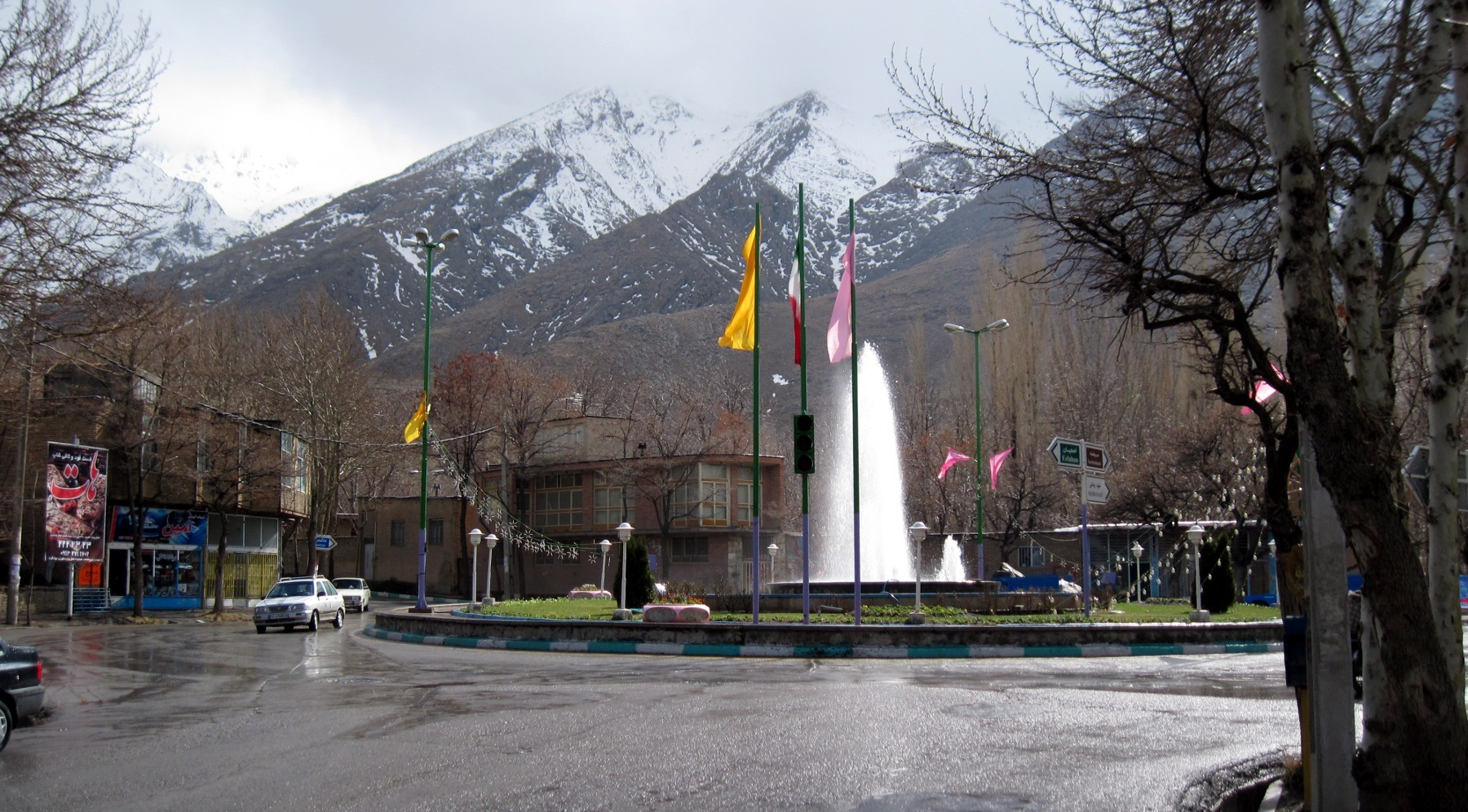
- Bahman Square in the city of Khansar

- Location within Iran
- Coordinates: 33°13′15″N 50°18′55″E
- Country: Iran
- Province: Isfahan
- County: Khansar
- District: Central

Population (2016)
  - Total: 21,883
- Time zone: UTC+3:30 (IRST)

Khansar (Persian: خوانسار) (Note: Also romanized as Khwānsār and Xānsār) is a city in the Central District of Khansar County, Isfahan province, Iran, serving as capital of both the county and the district.

== Etymology ==
The word Khansar is written and pronounced in several ways, including Khavansar, Khanisar, Khoonsar, Khosar, Khansar and Khunsar. The word consists of two parts, the khan and the sar. Khan means spring and pond, and the suffix sar indicates plurality.

== Population ==
At the time of the 2006 National Census, the city's population was 20,490 in 6,019 households. The following census in 2011 counted 21,338 people in 6,655 households. The 2016 census measured the population of the city as 21,883 people in 7,092 households.

== Geography ==
Khansar is located on both sides of a narrow valley through which the Khansar River, a stream about 4 metres (13 ft) wide, flows in a north-easterly direction to Qom.

== Notable people ==
- Adib Khansari, classical musician
- Ali Shojaei, Iranian football player
- Hacham Uriel Davidi, Jewish religious leader
- Mohammad Javad Zarif Khonsari, Iranian Diplomat and Academic, Former Minister of Foreign Affairs (Iran)
- Ali Akbar Mehrabian, Iranian politician, Ministry of Energy (Iran)
- Seyyed Ahmad Khansari, theologian, Marja'
- Yadollah Kaboli Khansari, calligrapher
