= Vist, Iran =

City in Isfahan province, Iran

Vist Persian: ويست
- City
- Location within Iran
- Coordinates: 33°20′51″N 50°06′52″E
- Country: Iran
- Province: Isfahan
- County: Khansar
- District: Central
- Established as a city: 2021

Population (2016)
  - Total: 2,514
- Time zone: UTC+3:30 (IRST)

Vist (Persian: ويست) (Note: Also Romanized as Vīst) is a city in the Central District of Khansar County, Isfahan province, Iran. As a village, it was the capital of Poshtkuh Rural District (Note: Renamed Golsar Rural District) until its capital was transferred to the village of Arjanak.

== Demographics ==
=== Population ===
At the time of the 2006 National Census, Vist's population was 2,337 in 709 households, when it was a village in Poshtkuh Rural District. The following census in 2011 counted 2,142 people in 700 households. The 2016 census measured the population of the village as 2,514 people in 861 households, the most populous in its rural district.

Vist was converted to a city in 2021.
