= Rahmatabad, Rafsanjan =

Rahmatabad رحمت آباد
- Village
- Location within Iran
- Coordinates: 30°43′43″N 55°53′22″E
- Country: Iran
- Province: Kerman
- County: Rafsanjan
- Bakhsh: Ferdows
- Rural District: Rezvan

Population (2006)
  - Total: 37
- Time zone: UTC+3:30 (IRST)
  - Summer (DST): UTC+4:30 (IRDT)

Rahmatabad (Persian: رحمت آباد, also Romanized as Raḩmatābād) is a village in Rezvan Rural District, Ferdows District, Rafsanjan County, Kerman Province, Iran. At the 2006 census, its population was 37, in 13 families.
