= Rahmatabad-e Mian Deran =

Rahmatabad-e Mian Deran رحمت ابادميان دران
- Village
- Location within Iran
- Coordinates: 27°43′39″N 58°50′38″E
- Country: Iran
- Province: Kerman
- County: Rudbar-e Jonubi
- Bakhsh: Jazmurian
- Rural District: Jazmurian

Population (2006)
  - Total: 1,013
- Time zone: UTC+3:30 (IRST)
  - Summer (DST): UTC+4:30 (IRDT)

Rahmatabad-e Mian Deran (Persian: رحمت ابادميان دران, also Romanized as Raḩmatābād-e Mīān Derān; also known as Raḩmatābād) is a village in Jazmurian Rural District, Jazmurian District, Rudbar-e Jonubi County, Kerman Province, Iran. At the 2006 census, its population was 1,013, in 209 families.
