= Kavand-e Darvishan =

Kavand-e Darvishan كاونددرويشان
- Village
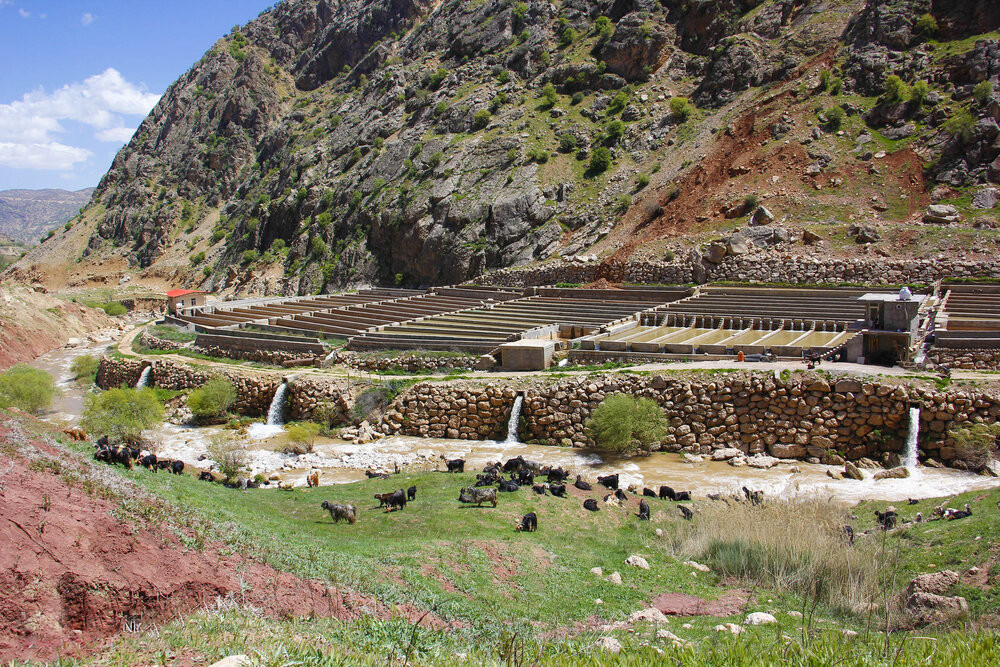

- Location within Iran
- Coordinates: 31°55′35″N 50°31′57″E
- Country: Iran
- Province: Chaharmahal and Bakhtiari
- County: ardal
- Bakhsh: ardal
- Rural District: ardal

Population (2006)
  - Total: 396
- Time zone: UTC+3:30 (IRST)
  - Summer (DST): UTC+4:30 (IRDT)

Kavand-e Darvishan (Persian: كاونددرويشان, also Romanized as Kāvand-e Darvīshān; also known as Kāvand) is a village in Ardal Rural District, Ardal District, Ardal County, Chaharmahal and Bakhtiari Province, Iran. At the 2006 census, its population registered at 396 people across 90 families. The village is populated by Lurs.
