= Rahmatabad-e Moinzadeh =

Rahmatabad-e Moinzadeh رحمت آبادمعين زاده
- Village
- Location within Iran
- Coordinates: 30°34′16″N 55°38′10″E
- Country: Iran
- Province: Kerman
- County: Rafsanjan
- Bakhsh: Koshkuiyeh
- Rural District: Koshkuiyeh

Population (2006)
  - Total: 142
- Time zone: UTC+3:30 (IRST)
  - Summer (DST): UTC+4:30 (IRDT)

Rahmatabad-e Moinzadeh (Persian: رحمت آبادمعين زاده, also Romanized as Raḩmatābād-e Moʿīnzādeh; also known as Raḩmatābād and Rahmat Abad Kashgoo’eyeh) is a village in Koshkuiyeh Rural District, Koshkuiyeh District, Rafsanjan County, Kerman Province, Iran. At the 2006 census, its population was 142, in 34 families.
