= Dehdati =

Dehdati دهداتي
- Village
- Location within Iran
- Coordinates: 26°18′34″N 60°40′31″E
- Country: Iran
- Province: Sistan and Baluchestan
- County: Qasr-e Qand
- Bakhsh: Central
- Rural District: Holunchekan

Population (2006)
  - Total: 251
- Time zone: UTC+3:30 (IRST)
  - Summer (DST): UTC+4:30 (IRDT)

Dehdati (Persian: دهداتي, also Romanized as Dehdātī, Deh Dātī, and Deh-e Datī; also known as Raḩmatābād, Dāydātī, and Deydātī) is a village in Holunchekan Rural District in the Central District of Qasr-e Qand County, Sistan and Baluchestan Province, Iran. At the 2006 census, its population was 251, in 39 families.
