= Rahmatabad, Jahrom =

Rahmatabad رحمت اباد
- Village
- Location within Iran
- Coordinates: 28°21′03″N 53°54′05″E
- Country: Iran
- Province: Fars
- County: Jahrom
- Bakhsh: Central
- Rural District: Kuhak

Population (2006)
  - Total: 20
- Time zone: UTC+3:30 (IRST)
  - Summer (DST): UTC+4:30 (IRDT)

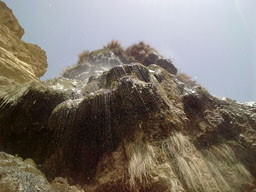
Rahmatabad Joyem Waterfall

Rahmatabad (Persian: رحمت اباد, also Romanized as Raḩmatābād) is a village in Kuhak Rural District, in the Central District of Jahrom County, Fars province, Iran. At the 2006 census, its population was 20, in 4 families.
