= Rahmatabad-e Do =

Rahmatabad-e Do رحمت اباد2
- Village
- Location within Iran
- Coordinates: 29°18′10″N 56°31′19″E
- Country: Iran
- Province: Kerman
- County: Baft
- Bakhsh: Central
- Rural District: Fathabad

Population (2006)
  - Total: 14
- Time zone: UTC+3:30 (IRST)
  - Summer (DST): UTC+4:30 (IRDT)

Rahmatabad-e Do (Persian: رحمت اباد2, also Romanized as Raḩmatābād-e Do; also known as Raḩmatābād) is a village in Fathabad Rural District, in the Central District of Baft County, Kerman Province, Iran. At the 2006 census, its population was 14, in 4 families.
