= Rahmatabad, Anbarabad =

Rahmatabad رحمت آباد
- Village
- Location within Iran
- Coordinates: 28°23′56″N 57°52′21″E
- Country: Iran
- Province: Kerman
- County: Anbarabad
- Bakhsh: Central
- Rural District: Jahadabad

Population (2006)
  - Total: 464
- Time zone: UTC+3:30 (IRST)
  - Summer (DST): UTC+4:30 (IRDT)

Rahmatabad (Persian: رحمت آباد, also Romanized as Raḥmatābād) is a village in Jahadabad Rural District, in the Central District of Anbarabad County, Kerman Province, Iran. At the 2006 census, its population was 464, in 110 families.
