= Surdag =

Surdag is a village in Karak District located in Khyber Pakhtunkhwa, Pakistan. Zip Code: 27200 Total Papulation: 4200 Male: 2000 Female: 2200 No of School High : (Male-01, Female-01) No of Primary Schools: 01 (F), 01 (M) Village Latamber, Rahmat Abad, Bahadar Khel and Shobley Kala are located in West, East, North and South respectively.

Surdag is located at a latitude of 34°18'56.9988" N, and a longitude of 70°13'54.0012" E.
