= Serbian whist =

Serbian whist is a variant of whist. It is popular in Serbia, and there it is simply called "whist" (Serbian Latin: vist).

== Rules ==
Serbian whist is a game for 4 players (but rules can be modified for 5 or 6). Each player plays alone.

From a standard deck use 13 cards for every player, in the first hand. Every hand after first, one card less is dealt, until only one card is dealt. Then for the next 4 hands (in the case of 4 player game), including the first one, only 1 card is dealt so every player gets a chance to be a dealer.

After those 4 hands, number of cards dealt starts to rise again by one card each hand until it hits 13 again, after which the game ends.

Each hand different suit acts as a trump. On the first hand, Spades are the trump suit, then Diamonds, then Hearts and lastly - Clubs. Consequent hand is called 'Sans', and on that hand there are no trumps. Trump suit sequence continues until the end of the game.

(Spades - Diamonds - Hearts - Clubs - Sans)

The cards rank as follows: A, K, Q, J, 10, 9, 8, 7, 6, 5, 4, 3, 2. They have no value, because it is a game for tricks only.

=== Deal ===
The first dealer is chosen at random. Then the turn to deal rotates counter-clockwise after each hand. First player in each hand is the player sitting to the right of the dealer.

=== Bidding ===
Each player in order, beginning with the player to dealer's right, bids how many tricks they think they will take. All bids are final and cannot be changed afterward.

To ensure that not everyone will succeed in their bid, the sum of all tricks bid must not be the same as the number of cards dealt to each player. (Example: hand with six cards, four players: The first player bids "2", second "0" and third "1". The last player cannot bid "3", as this would make the sum of the tricks equal to 6. in this case, the last bidder must bid 0, 1, 2, 4, 5 or 6).

This rule puts the last bidder (the dealer) at a disadvantage, especially in the one-card hands. To counter this disadvantage, a series of one-card hands, equal to the number of players, is played.

=== Play ===
The player to dealer's right plays the first card. The other players must play a card of the same suit if possible. Any player who has no card of the suit led must play a trump if they can. A player who has no cards of the suit led and no trumps can discard any card. The trick is won by whoever played the highest trump, or if no trump was played, by whoever played the highest card of the suit led. The winner of the trick leads to the next.

The objective is to win exactly the number of tricks you said you would win.

=== Scoring ===
The hand ends when all cards are played.

- Players who made their contract (exactly) get 10 points plus the number of tricks they made.
- Players who took fewer tricks than their bid get one point for each trick.
  (Alternative, harsher rule: They lose 10 points on top of the points they gained through tricks, e.g. You bid 3, get only 2 so you lose 8 points (2-10=8))
- Players who took more tricks than their bid also get one point for each trick.
- Players who took no tricks and who bid more than 0, lose 10 points.

Examples: Suppose you bid 2 tricks. If you take exactly 2 you will win 12 points (2+10). If you take only one trick you get 1 point; If you take no trick you lose 10 points. The table for recording the points looks like this:

            Igor       Jovana      Dunja    Dušan
 -------------------------------------------------
   13 2     2  12      4   14      2   1    6  16
   12 3     1  14      3   27      5   5    4  19

and so on.

The number of cards dealt in each hand is recorded in the first column on the left along with trump suit. Subsequent columns are used to record the bids and the cumulative score of each player.

On the first hand, 13 cards are dealt, spades (2) were trump and Igor bid 2 tricks and made it (2+10=12 points), Jovana bid 4 tricks and succeeded (4+10=14 points), Dunja bid "1" and didn't make it (1 point) and Dušan bid hefty 6 tricks, but made it.

== Alternative Scoring ==
Seeing that Serbian whist has many similarities with Oh, hell, the scoring alternatives are the same.

1. Exact scoring: A player who makes the exact number of tricks bid scores 10 plus the amount bid. Players who overbid or underbid score nothing.
2. Exact scoring with penalty: A player who makes the exact number of tricks bid scores 10 plus the amount bid. Players who underbid are deducted points in the amount of the bid. (Missing a 3 bid scores -3; missing a zero bid scores 0.) Used in the Hassenpfeffer variant.
3. 10 times exact scoring: Similar to Exact scoring, with or without penalty, but each trick bid is worth 10 points; a player who bids 4 is awarded 40 points for exactly making the bid and scores either zero or -40 if he does not make the contract.
4. Penalty under, Zero Over: A variation of exact scoring that combines variants with and without penalties; overtricking scores zero points while undertricking results in a penalty according to the specific exact scoring variant used. This promotes "sacrificing" one's own contract by severely overtricking in order to "set" someone else.
5. Exact scoring with penalty where points are multiples of 5: A player who makes the exact number of tricks bid scores 10 plus the amount bid multiplied by 5. Players who underbid are deducted points in the amount of the bid multiplied by 5. (Missing a 3 bid scores (3*(-5))=-15; missing a zero bid scores -10. Making a 5 scores (10+5*5)=35) Used in the Cypriot variant. This variant encourages high bidding due to the number of possible points to gain.
6. Exact scoring with set penalty: A player who makes the exact number of tricks bid scores 10 plus the amount bid. Players who underbid score only one point for each trick. Players who overbid have "gone set" and lose 10 points, regardless of the number of tricks taken. For example, if a player who has bid four takes exactly 4 tricks, he scores 14. If he takes 5 tricks, he scores 5. If he takes 3 tricks, he scores -10.
7. Exact scoring with progressive penalty: A player who makes the exact number of tricks bid scores 10 plus the amount bid. Players who underbid or overbid lose the amount of the bid, plus ten points for each trick under or overbid. For example, a player bids 4: If he takes exactly 4 tricks, he scores 14. If he takes 3 or 5 tricks, he scores -14. If he takes 2 or 6 tricks, he scores -24. This variation makes it easier to "pile on the leader" and eliminate even a large lead in just one hand.
8. Reduced 0 bid: Similar to basic (or exact) scoring, with the modification that making a zero contract scores only five points. (Zero bids are often the easiest to make.)
9. Adjusted 0 bid: Similar to basic scoring, with the change that a zero bid is worth five plus the number of cards dealt out to a player. For example, in the first round, a successful zero bid is worth 6 points, while a successful one bid is worth 11 points. (Zero bids are harder to make in larger hands.)
10. Progressive scoring: As in basic scoring, a player that fails to make the contract receives a number of points equal to the number of tricks he takes. However, a successful bid is worth the 10-point threshold plus the square of the bid, thereby rewarding a person bidding and making four tricks with 26 (10 plus 16) points. This has the advantage of rewarding riskier bids, and making it possible for someone to catch up from behind more easily.
11. Simplified / Montreal progressive scoring: Each player receives 10 points for satisfying the contract plus twice the number of tricks taken, otherwise they receive zero points.
12. Negative scoring: The scoring system is reversed, as in golf, lowest score winning. Satisfying the contract scores zero points. The first undertrick or overtrick costs one point, and each additional undertrick/overtrick costs a point more than the one before it. For instance, 3 overtricks would add 6 points (the sum of 1, 2, and 3) to a player's total. This rewards sacrifices, for it is now often beneficial to risk an overtrick (1 point) to cost a person that is already down to get an additional undertrick (which will cost many more points).
13. Simplified negative scoring: Each player scores the square of the number of overtricks or undertricks taken.
14. Variant negative scoring: Each player who fails to satisfy the contract scores points according to the number of total tricks in that round (e.g., in a round where there were five total tricks, every unsuccessful player scores 5).
15. Spades double: In variations where the trump card is chosen randomly, some play that if a spade is turned up, the points for that round double.
16. Trick scoring: Each player that scores the number of tricks bid receives that many points, with the exception of correctly bidding 0, in which case the player receives a half point. Any overbid or underbid loses the number of points their bid was off (a player bidding 3 tricks that wins only 2 would lose a point, as would a player bidding 2 and winning 3).
17. Binary scoring:: A player who makes the exact number of tricks bid scores 10. Players who overbid or underbid score nothing.
18. Binary scoring with nil rule:: A player who makes the exact number of tricks bid scores 10. If the number of tricks exceeds the number of players, players who bid nil (zero) score 20 if they take no tricks, otherwise -10.
19. Scratch / Quick scoring:: Players who overbid or underbid get a scratch (signified by crossing through their unsuccessful bid). The person with the least scratches wins the game. In the unusual event there is a tie, the tied player who bid the most wins the game (This is done by adding up each tied-player's successful bids.)
20. Adjusted exact scoring: A player who makes the exact number of tricks receives that number of points plus the number of cards dealt out to a player.
21. Get Fred / Oy Vey scoring: A player who makes the exact number of tricks receives that number of points plus 10. Players who miss the contract loses the difference between the bid and the actual number of tricks taken. A player who bids three and takes either two or four tricks will lose one point. (In the Oy Vey variance, if many player are playing, often a successful bid is worth the 10-point threshold plus the square of the bid. This lifts the scores in the game, as the more players participate the lower the scores are.)
