= Rahmatabad, Selseleh =

Rahmatabad رحمتاباد
- Village
- Location within Iran
- Coordinates: 33°52′36″N 48°13′43″E
- Country: Iran
- Province: Lorestan
- County: Selseleh
- Bakhsh: Central
- Rural District: Yusefvand

Population (2006)
  - Total: 31
- Time zone: UTC+3:30 (IRST)
  - Summer (DST): UTC+4:30 (IRDT)

Rahmatabad (Persian: رحمتاباد, also Romanized as Raḩmatābād; also known as Rahmat) is a village in Yusefvand Rural District, in the Central District of Selseleh County, Lorestan Province, Iran. At the 2006 census, its population was 31, in 7 families.
