= Dashtabi-ye Gharbi Rural District =

Rural district in Qazvin province, Iran

Dashtabi-ye Gharbi Rural District Persian: دهستان دشتابي غربي
- Rural District
- Location within Iran
- Coordinates: 36°05′N 49°50′E
- Country: Iran
- Province: Qazvin
- County: Buin Zahra
- District: Dashtabi
- Established: 1987
- Capital: Ardaq

Population (2016)
  - Total: 9,916
- Time zone: UTC+3:30 (IRST)

Dashtabi-ye Gharbi Rural District (Persian: دهستان دشتابي غربي) is in Dashtabi District of Buin Zahra County, Qazvin province, Iran. It is administered from the city of Ardaq.

== Demographics ==
=== Population ===
At the time of the 2006 National Census, the rural district's population was 9,753 in 2,370 households. There were 10,447 inhabitants in 2,957 households at the following census of 2011. The 2016 census measured the population of the rural district as 9,916 in 3,053 households. The most populous of its 22 villages was Saidabad, with 1,465 people.

=== Other villages in the rural district ===
- Ahmadabad
- Dizan
- Jowharin
- Rahmatabad-e Bozorg
- Shadmahan
- Shared
- Suliqan
