= Dashtabi-ye Sharqi Rural District =

Rural district in Qazvin province, Iran

Dashtabi-ye Sharqi Rural District Persian: دهستان دشتابي شرقي
- Rural District
- Location within Iran
- Coordinates: 36°05′N 49°57′E
- Country: Iran
- Province: Qazvin
- County: Buin Zahra
- District: Dashtabi
- Established: 1987
- Capital: Shahrestanak

Population (2016)
  - Total: 10,210
- Time zone: UTC+3:30 (IRST)

Dashtabi-ye Sharqi Rural District (Persian: دهستان دشتابي شرقي) is in Dashtabi District of Buin Zahra County, Qazvin province, Iran. Its capital is the village of Shahrestanak.

== Demographics ==
=== Population ===
At the time of the 2006 National Census, the rural district's population was 9,554 in 2,247 households. There were 9,600 inhabitants in 2,699 households at the following census of 2011. The 2016 census measured the population of the rural district as 10,210 in 3,069 households. The most populous of its 22 villages was Shahin Tappeh, with 2,440 people.

=== Other villages in the rural district ===
- Aqa Baba
- Hoseynabad-e Amini
- Lia
- Mavin
- Now Deh-e Lakvan
- Vajihabad
- Zoleykha
