= Khansar County =

County in Isfahan province, Iran

Khansar County Persian: شهرستان خوانسار
- County
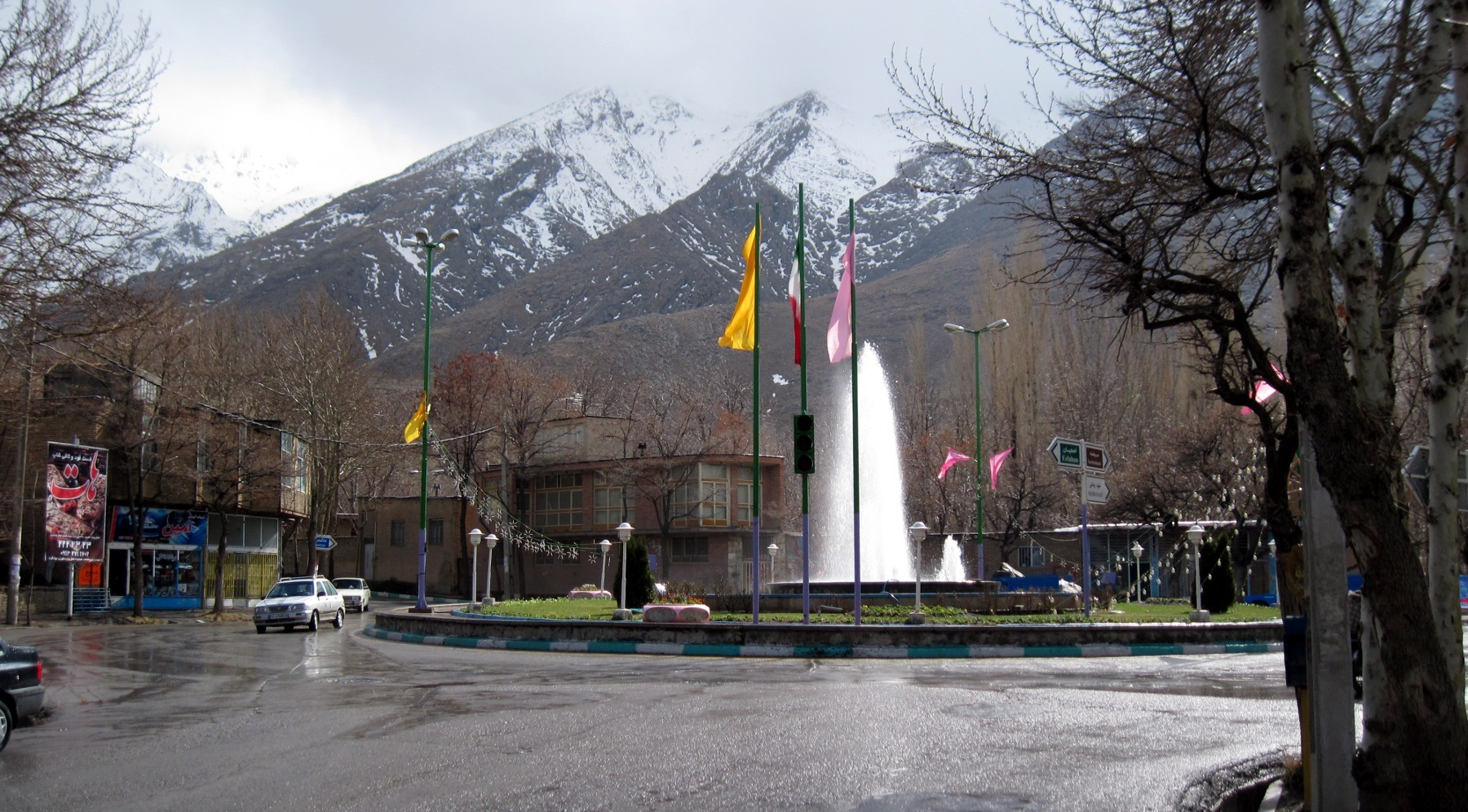
- Bahman Square in the city of Khansar

- Location of Khansar County in Isfahan province (top left, green)

- Location of Isfahan province in Iran
- Coordinates: 33°17′N 50°21′E
- Country: Iran
- Province: Isfahan
- Capital: Khansar
- Districts: Central

Population (2016)
  - Total: 33,049
- Time zone: UTC+3:30 (IRST)

Khansar County (Persian: شهرستان خوانسار) is in Isfahan province, Iran. Its capital is the city of Khansar.

== History ==
The village of Vist was converted to a city in 2021.

== Demographics ==
=== Population ===
At the time of the 2006 census, the county's population was 31,542 in 9,394 households. The following census in 2011 counted 32,423 people in 10,186 households. The 2016 census measured the population of the county as 33,049 in 10,923 households.

=== Administrative divisions ===
Khansar County's population history and administrative structure over three consecutive censuses are shown in the following table.

Khansar County Population
Administrative Divisions	2006	2011	2016
Central District	31,542	32,423	33,049
Cheshmeh Sar RD	3,832	4,426	4,098
Golsar RD (Note: Formerly Poshtkuh Rural District)	4,495	4,211	4,427
Kuhsar RD	2,725	2,448	2,641
Khansar (city)	20,490	21,338	21,883
Vist (city) (Note: Became a city after the 2016 census)			
Total	31,542	32,423	33,049
RD = Rural District

Media related to Khvansar County at Wikimedia Commons
