= Central District (Khansar County) =

District in Isfahan province, Iran

Central District (Khansar County) Persian: بخش مرکزی شهرستان خوانسار
- District
- Location within Iran
- Coordinates: 33°17′N 50°21′E
- Country: Iran
- Province: Isfahan
- County: Khansar
- Capital: Khansar

Population (2016)
  - Total: 33,049
- Time zone: UTC+3:30 (IRST)

The Central District of Khansar County (Persian: بخش مرکزی شهرستان خوانسار) is in Isfahan province, Iran. Its capital is the city of Khansar.

== History ==
The village of Vist was converted to a city in 2021.

== Demographics ==
=== Population ===
At the time of the 2006 National Census, the district's population was 31,542 in 9,394 households. The following census in 2011 counted 32,423 people in 10,186 households. The 2016 census measured the population of the district as 33,049 inhabitants in 10,923 households.

=== Administrative divisions ===
Central District (Khansar County) Population
Administrative Divisions	2006	2011	2016
Cheshmeh Sar RD	3,832	4,426	4,098
Golsar RD (Note: Formerly Poshtkuh Rural District)	4,495	4,211	4,427
Kuhsar RD	2,725	2,448	2,641
Khansar (city)	20,490	21,338	21,883
Vist (city) (Note: Became a city after the 2016 census)			
Total	31,542	32,423	33,049
RD = Rural District
