= Dashtabi District =

District in Qazvin province, Iran

Dashtabi District Persian: بخش دشتابی
- District
- Location within Iran
- Coordinates: 36°05′N 49°54′E
- Country: Iran
- Province: Qazvin
- County: Buin Zahra
- Established: 2000
- Capital: Ardaq

Population (2016)
  - Total: 25,169
- Time zone: UTC+3:30 (IRST)

Dashtabi District (Persian: بخش دشتابی) is in Buin Zahra County, Qazvin province, Iran. Its capital is the city of Ardaq.

== Demographics ==
=== Population ===
At the time of the 2006 National Census, the district's population was 24,139 in 5,879 households. The following census in 2011 counted 25,170 people in 7,124 households. The 2016 census measured the population of the district as 25,169 inhabitants in 7,718 households.

=== Administrative divisions ===
Dashtabi District Population
Administrative Divisions	2006	2011	2016
Dashtabi-ye Gharbi RD	9,753	10,447	9,916
Dashtabi-ye Sharqi RD	9,554	9,600	10,210
Ardaq (city)	4,832	5,123	5,043
Total	24,139	25,170	25,169
RD = Rural District
