= List of cities, towns and villages in Qazvin province =

A list of cities, towns and villages in Qazvin Province of northern Iran:

== Alphabetical ==
Cities are in bold text; all others are villages.

=== A ===
Ab Barik | Ab Darreh | Abbasabad | Abbasabad | Abbasabad-e Seyf | Abbasak | Abdol Robababad | Abdolabad | Abdolabad | Abdollah Masud-e Olya | Abdollah Masud-e Sofla | Abgarm | Abkhvoreh | Abyek | Abyek-e Sofla | Adar | Aftab Dar | Ahmadabad | Ahmadabad | Ahmadabad | Ahmadabad-e Owfan | Ain | Ajor Band | Ajorpazy Eshratabad Industrial Centre | Ak | Ak | Ak | Akbarabad | Akbarabad | Aku Jan | Alangan | Aliabad | Aliabad | Aliabad | Aliabad | Aliabad | Aliabad | Alin | Alindar | Alnaqiyah | Altin Kosh | Alulak | Alvand | Alvandi | Amadgah Abyek | Amand | Ameshk | Aminabad | Aminabad | Amirabad | Amirabad-e Eqbal | Amirabad-e Kohneh | Amirabad-e Now | Amrudak | Anbaqin | Andaj | Andaq | Angur Azuj | Anjilaq | Aq Bolagh | Aq Duz | Aqa Baba | Aqa Baba | Aqagir | Aqchari | Aqcheh Kand | Aqcheh Mazar | Aqcheh Qaleh | Aqjeh Qeshlaq | Aranjak | Arasanj-e Jadid | Arasanj-e Qadim | Arasht | Arbat Darreh | Arbedian | Ardabilak | Ardak | Ardak | Ardalan | Arqih | Arteshabad | Aruchan | Arunqash | Arvan | Asadabad | Asadabad-e Khurin | Asadi | Asbak | Asfastan | Asgharabad | Ashnestan | Ashtajin | Astalak | Astin Dar-e Olya | Astin Dar-e Sofla | Astin Dar-e Vosta | Asyan | Atan Rud | Atan | Atanak | Atash Anbar | Athad Now Brickworks | Avaj | Avan | Avanak | Avarneh | Avatar | Aveh | Avirak | Azaddeh | Azadrud | Azanbar | Azganin-e Olya | Azganin-e Sofla | Aznab | Azrat

=== B ===
Badamak | Bademjin | Badgheyn | Bagh Kalayeh | Baghalduz-e Olya | Baghdasht | Baghestan | Bahramabad | Bahramabad | Bahramabad-e Qaqazan | Bak Kandi | Bala Khanlu | Balakan | Band-e Sar | Band-e Zuyar | Baqerabad | Baqerabad-e Kord | Baqerabad-e Tork | Barajin | Barvaj | Barzaljin | Bashar | Bavers | Bazamjerd | Bazargah | Beheshtian | Behganeh Rud | Behjatabad | Bek Baghi | Beydli | Bi Ab | Bidestan | Biglar | Bon Zohreh | Brickworks | Buchinak-e Jadid | Buin Zahra | Buinak | Bukan | Burmanak | Buzelin

=== C ===
Chah Barf | Chalambar | Chaleh | Chaman-e Amirabad | Chanasak | Changal Dasht | Changureh | Changureh | Charbin | Charis | Charsh Darreh | Chenar-e Sofla | Chesgin | Cheshmeh-ye Gholamali | Chizeh | Chu Sar | Chubdar | Chubeh | Chubin Dar | Chubineh | Chuzah

=== D ===
Dabirian | Daghlan | Dakan | Dakhrajin | Danak | Danesfahan | Darak | Daral Sarvar | Darbahan | Darband | Dashtak | Daskin | Dastjerd | Dastjerd-e Olya | Dastjerd-e Sofla | Deh Dushab | Dehak | Dek | Dialabad | Didar | Dikin | Dinak | Dineh Kuh | Dineh Rud | Dizaj | Dizajin | Dizan | Dohneh | Dowlatabad | Dudah Chay | Duljak Khan-e Mohammadabad | Durchak

=== E ===
Ebrahimabad | Ebrahimabad | Ebrahimabad | Emamzadeh Abazar | Emamzadeh Ala ol Din | Emamzadeh Harun | Emamzadeh Mohammad | Emamzadeh | Eqbaliyeh | Esfarvarin | Eshratabad | Eslamabad | Esmailabad | Esmailabad | Esmatabad | Espik | Estalaj

=== F ===
Falizan | Fallar | Fanefin | Farkan | Fars Gholan | Farsajin | Farsian | Fashak | Fashalanj | Fathabad | Fetr | Feyzabad | Fileh Varin | Fishan

=== G ===
Gabri | Garmak | Garmarud | Garmarud-e Olya | Garmarud-e Sofla | Gashnerud | Gavanaj | Gazaneh | Gharib Mazraeh | Ghoncheh Khoran | Gil Zur | Gol Cheshmeh | Gol Zamin | Goldar | Gonbadak | Gorkin | Gowdari Kazruni | Gurkhaneh

=== H ===
Hadiabad | Haft Sanduq | Hajib | Hajji Arab | Hajji Shaban Brickworks | Hajji Tappeh | Hajjiabad | Hajjiabad | Hajjiabad | Hakimabad | Haladar | Halalabad | Halalabad | Halarud | Hamidabad | Hamidabad | Hand-e Zamin | Harain-e Olya | Haranak | Harif | Hasan Khani | Hasanabad | Hasanabad | Hasanabad | Hasanabad | Hasanabad | Hasanabad | Hasanabad-e Kalej | Hasanabad-e Sadat | Hasha Kalayeh | Hemmatabad | Heniz | Hesamabad | Hesar Kharvan | Hesar | Hesar | Hesar-e Valiyeasr | Heydarabad | Hezar Jolfa | Hileh Rud | Hir | Horian | Hoseynabad | Hoseynabad | Hoseynabad | Hoseynabad | Hoseynabad | Hoseynabad-e Amini | Hoseynabad-e Beglar Beygi | Hoseynabad-e Eqbal | Hoseynabad-e Jarandaq | Hoseynabad-e Kord | Hoseynabad-e Shah Nazar

=== I ===
Il Chupan | Ilan | Ilderjin | Iran Rubberworks

=== J ===
Jafarabad | Jahanabad | Jahanabad | Jam Jerd | Jannatabad | Jannatabad | Jarandaq | Jazmeh | Jir Duzan | Jirandeh | Jovin | Jowharin | Jowladak | Judaki | Jula Deh | Jutan | Juyank

=== K ===
Kachaleh Gerd | Kafar Kosh | Kahak | Kahvan | Kahvanak | Kakajin | Kakin | Kakuhestan | Kalan | Kalayeh | Kalayeh | Kalayeh | Kalin | Kallaj | Kalleh Kub | Kalleh Sar | Kalmin | Kamalabad | Kamalabad | Kaman | Kameshkan | Kandan Sar | Kaneshkin | Kangarin | Karandeh Chal | Kasha Rud | Kashkevar | Kashmarz | Katekan | Kavand | Kazlak | Kebrit Mian | Keshabad-e Olya | Keshabad-e Sofla | Khakashan | Khak-e Ali | Khakineh-ye Bala | Khakineh-ye Pain | Khaldin | Khanjar Bolagh | Kharaqan-e Sofla | Kharman Sukhteh | Kharuzak | Kharuzan | Kharzan | Khatayan | Khatunabad | Khazinabad | Kheyrabad | Kheyrabad | Khiaraj | Khondab | Khorram Brickworks | Khorram Poshteh | Khorramabad | Khorramdasht | Khorus Darreh | Khoshk Chal | Khosrowabad | Khosrud | Khuban | Khunan | Khuznan | Khuznin | Khvorhesht | Kia Deh | Kia Kalayeh-ye Olya | Kikhanan | Kiseh Jin | Kolah Darreh | Kolanjin | Kondor | Kordandeh | Kordjin | Kuchar | Kuchenan | Kuhgir-e Olya | Kuhgir-e Sofla | Kuhin | Kundaj | Kur Cheshmeh | Kuraneh | Kushk Dar | Kushk Dasht | Kushk | Kushkak | Kushkak

=== L ===
Lak | Lat | Lia Industrial Complex | Lia | Lotar | Lushkan | Lushkan Brickworks

=== M ===
Madan | Mahin | Mahmudabad Nemuneh | Mahmudabad | Mahmudabad | Mahmudabad | Mahmudabad | Mahmudabad-e Alam Khani | Mahmudian | Majidabad | Maliabad | Mamjin | Manbareh | Mandarabad | Mansur | Margasin | Markin | Mashaldar | Mashhad | Masudabad | Mavin | Mayan | Mazraeh Parseh Ay | Mazraeh-ye Baluk Zahra | Mazraeh-ye Mahmudi | Mazraeh-ye Olya | Mazraeh-ye Qadarati | Mazraeh-ye Raziabad | Mazraeh-ye Shirinabad | Mazraeh-ye Sofla | Mehdiabad | Mehdiabad-e Bozorg | Mehin | Meshaneh | Meshkin Tappeh | Meshkin | Meshkinabad | Mesrabad | Meymunak | Mianbar | Miandarreh | Mianej | Miankuh | Milak | Milaq | Minudasht | Mir Khavand-e Olya | Mir Khavand-e Sofla | Mizuj | Moallem Kalayeh | Moallem Khani-ye Bala | Moasseseh-ye Kashavarzi Kusar | Mohammad Deh | Mohammadabad | Mohammadabad-e Gar Gar | Mohammadabad-e Khareh | Mohammadiyeh | Molla Ali | Molla Kalayeh | Moqanak | Morad Beyglu | Moradabad | Moradabad | Morghdari-ye Sabah | Morteza Nak | Mortezaabad | Mostafalu | Murabad | Mushqin

=== N ===
Najafabad | Najafabad | Najafabad | Najmabad | Namakin | Naqqash | Narendeh | Narjeh | Naserabad | Naserabad | Naseri | Nasimabad | Nasirabad | Nasirabad-e Sadat | Nehran | Nesa | Nezamabad | Niaq | Nikuyeh | Nirej | Niyarak | Nohab | Normalat | Nosratabad | Nosratabad | Nosratabad | Nosratabad-e Bayeh | Now Deh | Now Deh | Now Dehak | Now Deh-e Lakvan | Nowduz | Nowruzabad | Nur Brickworks | Nurabad

=== O ===
Orazjin | Orkan-e Kord | Orkan-e Tork | Orosabad | Owzun Darreh

=== P ===
Palangeh | Papoli-ye Olya | Papoli-ye Vosta | Parachan | Parchkuh | Parsbanaj | Parvan | Pij Bon | Pir Yusefian | Pivand Farms | Plains Technology Company | Por Rud

=== Q ===
Qadimabad | Qahvaj | Qalat | Qaleh Abdol Robababad | Qaleh Juq | Qaleh | Qaleh | Qaleh-ye Jangi | Qaleh-ye Qareh Dash | Qaleh-ye Shohadad | Qameshlu | Qanbarabad | Qanqanlu | Qaracheh Qia | Qarah Bagh | Qarah Bolagh | Qarah Cham | Qarah Dash Parchik | Qarah Dash | Qarah Karselu | Qarah Qobad | Qarah Qurtan | Qareh Aghaj | Qarkhun | Qarqasin | Qasemabad | Qasemabad | Qazan Chal | Qazan Daghi | Qazi Kalayeh | Qazvin | Qazvin-Rasht Road Construction Company | Qerkh Bolagh | Qermezabad | Qeshlaq | Qeshlaq-e Aminabad | Qeshlaq-e Charkhlu | Qeshlaq-e Hajjiabad-e Olya | Qeshlaq-e Moranlu | Qeynarjeh | Qez Qaleh-ye Bozorg | Qezel Darreh | Qitul | Qolalu | Qom Yek-e Kuchak | Qomik-e Bozorg | Qostin Lar | Qostin Naheyeh | Qostin Rud | Qurqurak | Qushchi | Qusheh Qui | Quzlu

=== R ===
Radekan | Rahimabad | Rahimabad | Rahmatabad-e Bozorg | Rahmatabad-e Kuchak | Rajai Dasht | Rameshan | Rashkin | Razak | Razan | Raziabad | Razjerd | Razmian | Reshtqun | Rostamabad | Ruch-e Olya | Ruch-e Sofla | Rudak | Rudbar | Ruhabad | Ruvand

=== S ===
Sabzak | Sadeqabad | Sadeqabad | Sadrabad | Safarin | Sagaznab | Sagezabad | Sagharan-e Olya | Sagharan-e Sofla | Saidabad | Saidabad | Saj | Sakhsabad | Salar Kia | Samghabad | Sangan-e Olya | Sangan-e Sofla | Sangavin | Sapuhin | Saraj Kalayeh | Saras | Sarbanak | Sayen Kalayeh | Sayin Darreh | Saznaq | Sefid Ab | Sefiddar | Sefideh Kash | Selaqai | Senjanak | Senjdar | Seyfabad | Shabanak | Shadman | Shafiabad | Shafiabad | Shafiabad | Shah Qadam | Shahidabad | Shahin Tappeh | Shahrabad | Shahrak | Shahrak-e Danesh | Shahrak-e Modarres | Shahrak-e Sanati-ye Alborz | Shahrak-e Sanati-ye Arasanj | Shahrak-e Sanati-ye Lia | Shahrbaz | Shahrestan | Shahrestanak | Shahrestan-e Olya | Shahrestan-e Sofla | Shahrsanati-ye Takestan | Shahvaran | Shakhdar | Shakin | Shal | Shal Brick Company | Shanastaq-e Olya | Shanastaq-e Sofla | Shanbarak | Shangol Rud | Shanin | Shared | Sharifabad Cultural Centre | Sharifabad | Sharifabad | Sharin | Shekarnab | Shenasvand | Shenazand | Shenin Qaqazan | Sherkat-e Margh Tak | Sherkat-e Yushvand | Sheyd Esfahan | Sheykhlar | Shingel | Shinqar | Shirazak | Shirkuh | Shisheh Qaleh | Shizand | Shizar | Shizar | Sholomeh | Shorket-e Zormorgh | Shotorak Makhvorin | Shotorak | Shur Ab | Shurestan-e Olya | Shurestan-e Sofla | Shurjeh | Siah Push | Sichanlu | Silikan | Simiyar | Simiyar Dasht | Sinak | Sir Ab | Sirdan | Soleymanabad | Soleymanabad | Soltanabad | Somaq | Sonbolabad | Sorkh Kuleh | Sorkheh Dozak | Sowminak | Sugah | Sukhteh Chenar | Suli Darreh | Suli Darreh Darbahan | Suliqan | Suravjin | Suroshan | Sus | Suteh Kosh

=== T ===
Tablshekin | Tahmursabad | Takand | Takestan | Talater | Taleh | Tanureh | Taq Darreh | Taratun | Tarazan-e Olya | Tarazan-e Sofla | Tarvizak | Tarzak | Taskin | Tatnak | Tavan | Tazarkosh | Tazehabad | Tian Dasht | Tikhvor | Tofak | Torkan | Tuabad | Tudaran | Tuinan | Tuteh Chal | Tuyuqchi

=== U ===
Unity Cooperative Company

=== V ===
Vajihabad | Valadabad | Valamedar | Valazjerd | Valiabad | Vanash-e Bala | Vanash-e Pain | Vandar | Vangin | Varak | Varakeh Rud | Varas | Varbon | Vargil | Varsaj Dudangeh | Vartavan | Varuq | Viar | Vikan | Voshteh | Vosuqabad

=== Y ===
Ya Rud | Yahyaabad | Yalabad | Yaleh Gonbad | Yam Cheshmeh | Yamaq | Yamaqan | Yanesabad | Yaqubabad | Yaqubabad | Yarafi | Yariabad | Yasti Bolagh | Yazan | Yazbar | Yazdeh Rud | Yengi Kahriz | Yerak | Yerjan | Yuj | Yusefabad | Yuzbashi Chay

=== Z ===
Zafaran | Zagheh | Zahabad | Zaj Kan-e Sofla | Zakan | Zanasuj | Zarabad | Zarand | Zard Chal | Zardchin | Zargar | Zarjeh Bostan | Zarrinabad | Zarrinabad | Zavarak | Zavardasht | Zereshk | Zeynabad | Ziaabad | Ziaran | Ziaran Meat Packing Company | Zitak Qeshlaq | Zoleykha | Zuyar
