= Molla Ali, Qazvin =

Molla Ali ملاعلي
- Village
- Location within Iran
- Coordinates: 36°30′39″N 49°31′00″E
- Country: Iran
- Province: Qazvin
- County: Qazvin
- Bakhsh: Tarom Sofla
- Rural District: Kuhgir

Population (2006)
  - Total: 54
- Time zone: UTC+3:30 (IRST)
  - Summer (DST): UTC+4:30 (IRDT)

Molla Ali (Persian: ملاعلي, also Romanized as Mollā ‘Alī and Mulla-Ali) is a village in Kuhgir Rural District, Tarom Sofla District, Qazvin County, Qazvin Province, Iran. At the 2006 census, its population was 54, in 16 families.
