= Kafar Kosh =

Kafar Kosh كافركش
- Village
- Location within Iran
- Coordinates: 36°23′24″N 50°35′36″E
- Country: Iran
- Province: Qazvin
- County: Qazvin
- Bakhsh: Rudbar-e Alamut
- Rural District: Alamut-e Pain

Population (2006)
  - Total: 42
- Time zone: UTC+3:30 (IRST)
  - Summer (DST): UTC+4:30 (IRDT)

Kafar Kosh (Persian: كافركش, also Romanized as Kāfar Kosh) is a village in Alamut-e Pain Rural District, Rudbar-e Alamut District, Qazvin County, Qazvin Province, Iran. At the 2006 census, its population was 42, in 15 families.
