= Yazbar =

Yazbar يزبر
- Village
- Location within Iran
- Coordinates: 36°03′01″N 50°05′54″E
- Country: Iran
- Province: Qazvin
- County: Abyek
- Bakhsh: Basharyat
- Rural District: Basharyat-e Gharbi

Population (2006)
  - Total: 334
- Time zone: UTC+3:30 (IRST)
  - Summer (DST): UTC+4:30 (IRDT)

Yazbar (Persian: يزبر) is a village in Basharyat-e Gharbi Rural District, Basharyat District, Abyek County, Qazvin Province, Iran. In the 2006 census, its population was 334, in 83 families.
