= Kangarin =

Kangarin كنگرين
- Village
- Location within Iran
- Coordinates: 36°34′30″N 50°00′36″E
- Country: Iran
- Province: Qazvin
- County: Qazvin
- Bakhsh: Alamut-e Gharbi
- Rural District: Dastjerd

Population (2006)
  - Total: 35
- Time zone: UTC+3:30 (IRST)
  - Summer (DST): UTC+4:30 (IRDT)

Kangarin (Persian: كنگرين, also Romanized as Kangarīn) is a village in Dastjerd Rural District, Alamut-e Gharbi District, Qazvin County, Qazvin Province, Iran. At the 2006 census, its population was 35, in 15 families.
