= Sapuhin =

Sapuhin سپوهين
- Village
- Location within Iran
- Coordinates: 36°28′04″N 50°10′13″E
- Country: Iran
- Province: Qazvin
- County: Qazvin
- Bakhsh: Alamut-e Gharbi
- Rural District: Rudbar-e Shahrestan

Population (2006)
  - Total: 109
- Time zone: UTC+3:30 (IRST)
  - Summer (DST): UTC+4:30 (IRDT)

Sapuhin (Persian: سپوهين, also Romanized as Sapūhīn and Sapoohin; also known as Sabūhīn) is a village in Rudbar-e Shahrestan Rural District, Alamut-e Gharbi District, Qazvin County, Qazvin Province, Iran. At the 2006 census, its population was 109, in 32 families.
