= Qolalu =

Qolalu قلالو
- Village
- Location within Iran
- Coordinates: 36°34′00″N 49°20′00″E
- Country: Iran
- Province: Qazvin
- County: Qazvin
- Bakhsh: Tarom Sofla
- Rural District: Khandan

Population (2006)
  - Total: 156
- Time zone: UTC+3:30 (IRST)
  - Summer (DST): UTC+4:30 (IRDT)

Qolalu (Persian: قلالو, also Romanized as Qolālū) is a village in Khandan Rural District, Tarom Sofla District, Qazvin County, Qazvin Province, Iran. At the 2006 census, its population was 156, in 43 families.
