= Zanasuj =

Zanasuj زناسوج
- Village
- Location within Iran
- Coordinates: 36°25′49″N 50°11′16″E
- Country: Iran
- Province: Qazvin
- County: Qazvin
- Bakhsh: Alamut-e Gharbi
- Rural District: Rudbar-e Shahrestan

Population (2011)
  - Total: 145
- Time zone: UTC+3:30 (IRST)
  - Summer (DST): UTC+4:30 (IRDT)

Zanasuj (Persian: زناسوج, also Romanized as Zanāsūj) is a village in Rudbar-e Shahrestan Rural District, Alamut-e Gharbi District, Qazvin County, Qazvin Province, Iran. At the 2006 census, its population was 10, in 4 families.
