= Kahvanak =

Kahvanak كهوانك
- Village
- Location within Iran
- Coordinates: 36°12′59″N 50°19′27″E
- Country: Iran
- Province: Qazvin
- County: Abyek
- Bakhsh: Central
- Rural District: Kuhpayeh-e Gharbi

Population (2006)
  - Total: 22
- Time zone: UTC+3:30 (IRST)
  - Summer (DST): UTC+4:30 (IRDT)

Kahvanak (Persian: كهوانك, also Romanized as Kahvānak) is a village in Kuhpayeh-e Gharbi Rural District, in the Central District of Abyek County, Qazvin Province, Iran. At the 2006 census, its population was 22, in 11 families.
