= Sorkh Kuleh =

Sorkh Kuleh سرخ كوله
- Village
- Location within Iran
- Coordinates: 36°23′40″N 50°32′37″E
- Country: Iran
- Province: Qazvin
- County: Qazvin
- Bakhsh: Rudbar-e Alamut
- Rural District: Alamut-e Bala

Population (2006)
  - Total: 78
- Time zone: UTC+3:30 (IRST)
  - Summer (DST): UTC+4:30 (IRDT)

Sorkh Kuleh (Persian: سرخ كوله, also Romanized as Sorkh Kūleh) is a village in Alamut-e Bala Rural District, Rudbar-e Alamut District, Qazvin County, Qazvin Province, Iran. At the 2006 census, its population was 78, in 22 families.
