= Zitak Qeshlaq =

Zitak Qeshlaq زيتك قشلاق
- Village
- Location within Iran
- Coordinates: 36°34′02″N 49°42′03″E
- Country: Iran
- Province: Qazvin
- County: Qazvin
- Bakhsh: Kuhin
- Rural District: Ilat-e Qaqazan-e Sharqi

Population (2006)
  - Total: 92
- Time zone: UTC+3:30 (IRST)
  - Summer (DST): UTC+4:30 (IRDT)

Zitak Qeshlaq (Persian: زيتك قشلاق, also Romanized as Zītak Qeshlāq; also known as Zītak) is a village in Ilat-e Qaqazan-e Sharqi Rural District, Kuhin District, Qazvin County, Qazvin Province, Iran. At the 2006 census, its population was 92, in 20 families.
