= Behganeh Rud =

Behganeh Rud بهگانه رود
- Village
- Location within Iran
- Coordinates: 36°25′57″N 49°21′06″E
- Country: Iran
- Province: Qazvin
- County: Qazvin
- Bakhsh: Tarom Sofla
- Rural District: Niyarak

Population (2006)
  - Total: 68
- Time zone: UTC+3:30 (IRST)
  - Summer (DST): UTC+4:30 (IRDT)

Behganeh Rud (Persian: بهگانه رود, also Romanized as Behgāneh Rūd, Behqānarūd, Behqāneh Rūd, and Bekhnana-Rud) is a village in Niyarak Rural District, Tarom Sofla District, Qazvin County, Qazvin Province, Iran. At the 2006 census, its population was 68, in 12 families.
