= Shahrestan-e Olya =

Shahrestan-e Olya شهرستان عليا
- Village
- Location within Iran
- Coordinates: 36°32′03″N 50°12′02″E
- Country: Iran
- Province: Qazvin
- County: Qazvin
- Bakhsh: Alamut-e Gharbi
- Rural District: Rudbar-e Shahrestan

Population (2006)
  - Total: 162
- Time zone: UTC+3:30 (IRST)
  - Summer (DST): UTC+4:30 (IRDT)

Shahrestan-e Olya (Persian: شهرستان عليا, also Romanized as Shahrestān-e ‘Olyā; also known as Shahrestān-e Bālā, Shahristān, and Shahristān Bāla) is a village in Rudbar-e Shahrestan Rural District, Alamut-e Gharbi District, Qazvin County, Qazvin Province, Iran. At the 2006 census, its population was 162, in 49 families.
