= Sangavin =

Sangavin سنگاوين
- Village
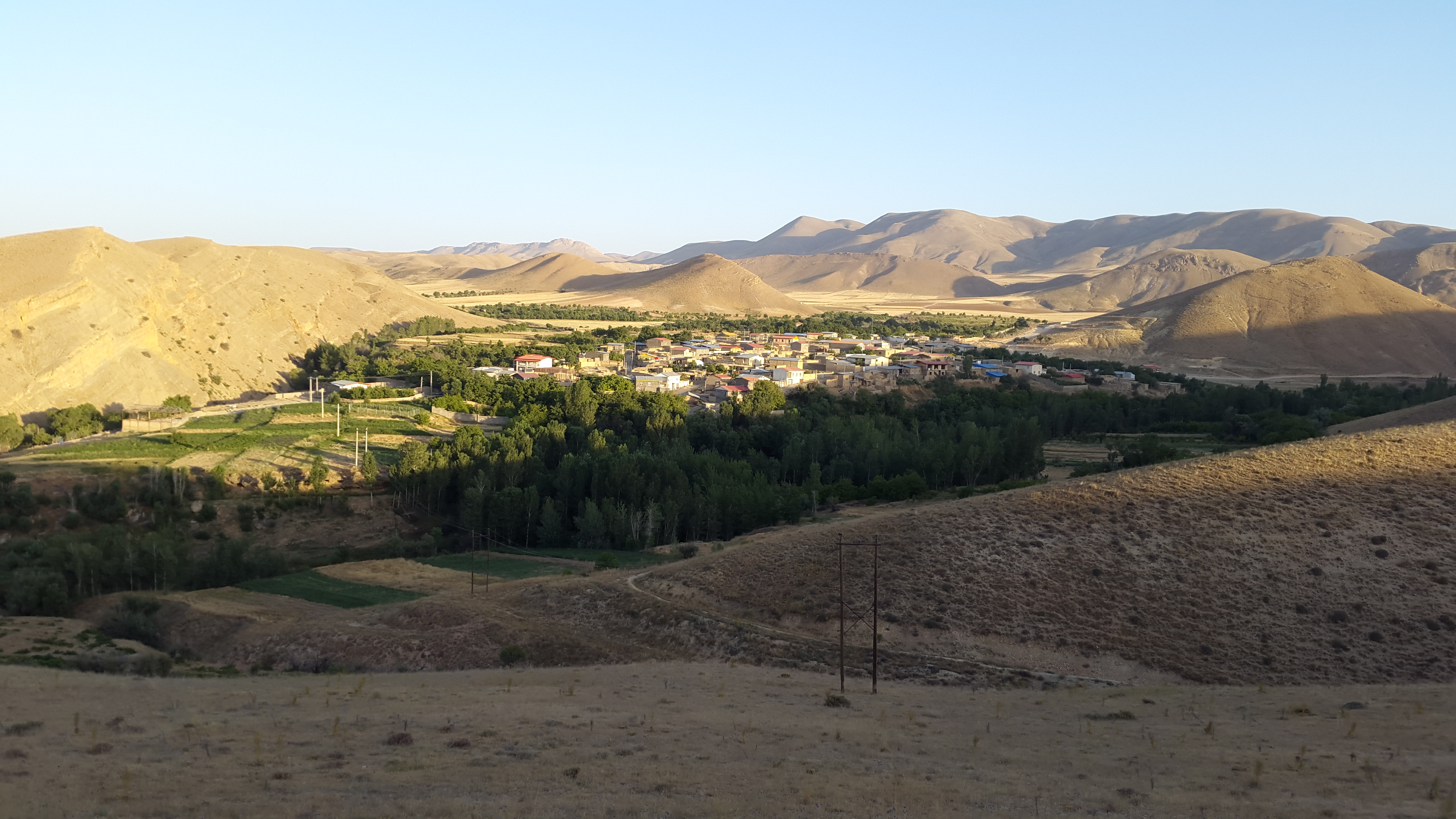

- Location within Iran
- Coordinates: 35°27′12″N 49°33′03″E
- Country: Iran
- Province: Qazvin
- County: Avaj
- Bakhsh: Central District
- Rural District: Shahidabad

Population (2006)
  - Total: 296
- Time zone: UTC+3:30 (IRST)

Sangavin (Persian: سنگاوين, also Romanized as Sangāvīn and Sangābīn) is a village in Shahidabad Rural District, Central District, Avaj County, Qazvin Province, Iran. At the 2006 census, its population was 296, in 75 families.
