= Bagh Kalayeh =

Bagh Kalayeh باغ كلايه
- Village
- Location within Iran
- Coordinates: 36°23′19″N 50°29′42″E
- Country: Iran
- Province: Qazvin
- County: Qazvin
- Bakhsh: Rudbar-e Alamut
- Rural District: Alamut-e Bala

Population (2006)
  - Total: 49
- Time zone: UTC+3:30 (IRST)
  - Summer (DST): UTC+4:30 (IRDT)

Bagh Kalayeh (Persian: باغ كلايه, also Romanized as Bāgh Kalāyeh) is a village in Alamut-e Bala Rural District, Rudbar-e Alamut District, Qazvin County, Qazvin Province, Iran. At the 2006 census, its population was 49, in 23 families.
