= Zard Chal =

Zard Chal زردچال
- Village
- Location within Iran
- Coordinates: 36°33′41″N 50°13′49″E
- Country: Iran
- Province: Qazvin
- County: Qazvin
- Bakhsh: Alamut-e Gharbi
- Rural District: Rudbar-e Shahrestan

Population (2006)
  - Total: 63
- Time zone: UTC+3:30 (IRST)
  - Summer (DST): UTC+4:30 (IRDT)

Zard Chal (Persian: زردچال, also Romanized as Zard Chāl) is a village in Rudbar-e Shahrestan Rural District, Alamut-e Gharbi District, Qazvin County, Qazvin Province, Iran. At the 2006 census, its population was 63, in 13 families.
