= Badgheyn =

Badgheyn بادغين
- Village
- Location within Iran
- Coordinates: 35°41′23″N 49°24′21″E
- Country: Iran
- Province: Qazvin
- County: Avaj
- Bakhsh: Abgarm
- Rural District: Kharaqan-e Sharqi

Population (2006)
  - Total: 146
- Time zone: UTC+3:30 (IRST)
  - Summer (DST): UTC+4:30 (IRDT)

Badgheyn (Persian: بادغين, also Romanized as Bādgheyn) is a village in Kharaqan-e Sharqi Rural District, Abgarm District, Avaj County, Qazvin Province, Iran. At the 2006 census, its population was 146, in 42 families.
