= Dizajin =

Dizajin ديزجين
- Village
- Location within Iran
- Coordinates: 36°38′44″N 49°04′06″E
- Country: Iran
- Province: Qazvin
- County: Qazvin
- Bakhsh: Tarom Sofla
- Rural District: Khandan

Population (2006)
  - Total: 56
- Time zone: UTC+3:30 (IRST)
  - Summer (DST): UTC+4:30 (IRDT)

Dizajin (Persian: ديزجين, also Romanized as Dīzajīn, Dīzeh Jīn, Dizadzhin, Dīzahjīn, Dīzejīn, and Dizjin) is a village in Khandan Rural District, Tarom Sofla District, Qazvin County, Qazvin Province, Iran. At the 2006 census, its population was 56, in 22 families.
