= Hand-e Zamin =

Hand-e Zamin هندي زمين
- Village
- Location within Iran
- Coordinates: 36°46′21″N 49°07′35″E
- Country: Iran
- Province: Qazvin
- County: Qazvin
- Bakhsh: Tarom Sofla
- Rural District: Khandan

Population (2006)
  - Total: 137
- Time zone: UTC+3:30 (IRST)
  - Summer (DST): UTC+4:30 (IRDT)

Hand-e Zamin (Persian: هندي زمين, also Romanized as Hand-e Zamīn, Hend Zamīn, Hind Zamīn, and Khind-Zamin; also known as Mandī Zamīn) is a village in Khandan Rural District, Tarom Sofla District, Qazvin County, Qazvin Province, Iran. At the 2006 census, its population was 137, in 30 families.
