= Chesgin =

Village in Qazvin province, Iran

Chesgin Persian: چسگين
- Village
- Location within Iran
- Coordinates: 35°43′43″N 49°49′33″E
- Country: Iran
- Province: Qazvin
- County: Buin Zahra
- District: Ramand
- Rural District: Ebrahimabad

Population (2016)
  - Total: 387
- Time zone: UTC+3:30 (IRST)

Chesgin (Persian: چسگين) (Note: Also romanized as Chasgīn and Chesgīn; also known as Chegīn, Chekīn, Cheskīn, and Chīskīn) is a village in Ebrahimabad Rural District of Ramand District in Buin Zahra County, Qazvin province, Iran.

== Demographics ==
=== Population ===
At the time of the 2006 National Census, the village's population was 480 in 146 households. The following census in 2011 counted 434 people in 146 households. The 2016 census measured the population of the village as 387 people in 136 households.

Of course, the permanent population of this village is estimated to be around 350-400 people. But on holidays, this village becomes very crowded. Especially during the Nowruz and summer holidays, when around 1500-2000 people come to Cheskin for accommodation and recreation. During the Iran-Israel war of 2025, around 5300 people came to this village, and during the Iran-Israel-America war of 2026, around 4100 people came to this village.
