= Qitul, Qazvin =

Qitul قيطول
- Village
- Location within Iran
- Coordinates: 36°46′26″N 49°07′58″E
- Country: Iran
- Province: Qazvin
- County: Qazvin
- Bakhsh: Tarom Sofla
- Rural District: Khandan

Population (2006)
  - Total: 113
- Time zone: UTC+3:30 (IRST)
  - Summer (DST): UTC+4:30 (IRDT)

Qitul (Persian: قيطول, also Romanized as Qīţūl, Kuitul, Qāitōl, Qeyţūl, and Qeyţūr) is a village in Khandan Rural District, Tarom Sofla District, Qazvin County, Qazvin Province, Iran. At the 2006 census, its population was 113, in 33 families. This village is populated by Azerbaijani Turks.
