= Sorkheh Dozak =

Sorkheh Dozak سرخه دزك
- Village
- Location within Iran
- Coordinates: 36°25′50″N 50°20′13″E
- Country: Iran
- Province: Qazvin
- County: Qazvin
- Bakhsh: Rudbar-e Alamut
- Rural District: Moallem Kalayeh

Population (2006)
  - Total: 69
- Time zone: UTC+3:30 (IRST)
  - Summer (DST): UTC+4:30 (IRDT)

Sorkheh Dozak (Persian: سرخه دزك; also known as Sorkh Dozdak) is a village in Moallem Kalayeh Rural District, Rudbar-e Alamut District, Qazvin County, Qazvin Province, Iran. At the 2006 census, its population was 69, in 20 families.
