= Chizeh =

Chizeh چيزه
- Village
- Location within Iran
- Coordinates: 36°34′44″N 49°01′39″E
- Country: Iran
- Province: Qazvin
- County: Qazvin
- Bakhsh: Tarom Sofla
- Rural District: Chuqur

Population (2006)
  - Total: 50
- Time zone: UTC+3:30 (IRST)
  - Summer (DST): UTC+4:30 (IRDT)

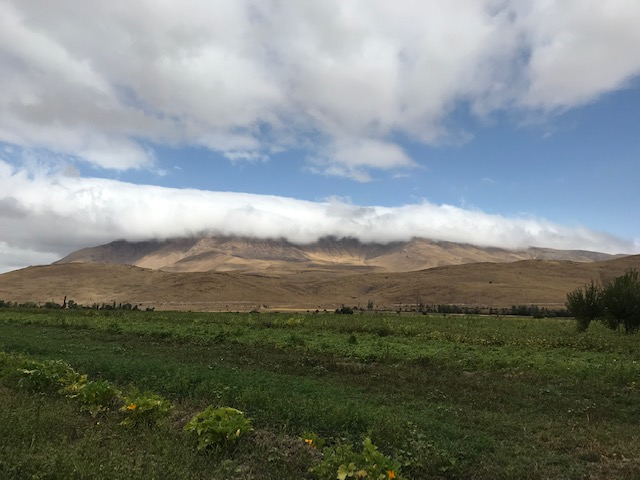
An landscape taken of the area surrounding Chizeh village.

Chizeh (Persian: چيزه, also Romanized as Chīzeh and Chiza) is a village in Chuqur Rural District, Tarom Sofla District, Qazvin County, Qazvin Province, Iran. At the 2006 census, its population was 50, in 14 families.
