= Rudbar, Qazvin =

Rudbar رودبر
- Village
- Location within Iran
- Coordinates: 36°22′08″N 49°27′09″E
- Country: Iran
- Province: Qazvin
- County: Qazvin
- Bakhsh: Tarom Sofla
- Rural District: Kuhgir

Population (2006)
  - Total: 38
- Time zone: UTC+3:30 (IRST)

Rudbar (Persian: رودبر, also Romanized as Rūdbar) is a village in Kuhgir Rural District, Tarom Sofla District, Qazvin County, Qazvin Province, Iran. At the 2006 census, its population was 38, in 9 families.
