= Qarah Cham =

Qarah Cham قره چم
- Village
- Location within Iran
- Coordinates: 36°46′34″N 49°08′25″E
- Country: Iran
- Province: Qazvin
- County: Qazvin
- Bakhsh: Tarom Sofla
- Rural District: Khandan

Population (2006)
  - Total: 126
- Time zone: UTC+3:30 (IRST)
  - Summer (DST): UTC+4:30 (IRDT)

Qarah Cham (Persian: قره چم, also Romanized as Qareh Cham) is a village in Khandan Rural District, Tarom Sofla District, Qazvin County, Qazvin Province, Iran. At the 2006 census, its population was 126, in 30 families.
