= Sarbanak =

Sarbanak ساربانك
- Village
- Location within Iran
- Coordinates: 36°28′57″N 49°45′23″E
- Country: Iran
- Province: Qazvin
- County: Qazvin
- Bakhsh: Kuhin
- Rural District: Ilat-e Qaqazan-e Sharqi

Population (2006)
  - Total: 184
- Time zone: UTC+3:30 (IRST)
  - Summer (DST): UTC+4:30 (IRDT)

Sarbanak (Persian: ساربانك, also Romanized as Sārbānak; also known as Sarvānak) is a village in Ilat-e Qaqazan-e Sharqi Rural District, Kuhin District, Qazvin County, Qazvin Province, Iran. At the 2006 census, its population was 184, in 36 families.
