= Mamjin =

Mamjin مامجين
- Village
- Location within Iran
- Coordinates: 36°03′15″N 50°07′47″E
- Country: Iran
- Province: Qazvin
- County: Abyek
- Bakhsh: Basharyat
- Rural District: Basharyat-e Gharbi

Population (2006)
  - Total: 203
- Time zone: UTC+3:30 (IRST)
  - Summer (DST): UTC+4:30 (IRDT)

Mamjin (Persian: مامجين, also Romanized as Māmjīn, Māmchīn, and Māmajīn) is a village in Basharyat-e Gharbi Rural District, Basharyat District, Abyek County, Qazvin Province, Iran. At the 2006 census, its population was 203, in 51 families.
