= Changal Dasht =

Changal Dasht چنگال دشت
- Village
- Location within Iran
- Coordinates: 36°36′32″N 49°57′47″E
- Country: Iran
- Province: Qazvin
- County: Qazvin
- Bakhsh: Alamut-e Gharbi
- Rural District: Dastjerd

Population (2006)
  - Total: 34
- Time zone: UTC+3:30 (IRST)
  - Summer (DST): UTC+4:30 (IRDT)

Changal Dasht (Persian: چنگال دشت, also Romanized as Changāl Dasht; also known as Changāl Vash) is a village in Dastjerd Rural District, Alamut-e Gharbi District, Qazvin County, Qazvin Province, Iran. At the 2006 census, its population was 34, in 10 families.
