= Madan, Qazvin =

Madan مدان
- Village
- Location within Iran
- Coordinates: 36°22′48″N 50°35′42″E
- Country: Iran
- Province: Qazvin
- County: Qazvin
- Bakhsh: Rudbar-e Alamut
- Rural District: Alamut-e Pain

Population (2006)
  - Total: 315
- Time zone: UTC+3:30 (IRST)
  - Summer (DST): UTC+4:30 (IRDT)

Madan (Persian: مدان, also Romanized as Madān and Meydān) is a village in Alamut-e Pain Rural District, Rudbar-e Alamut District, Qazvin County, Qazvin Province, Iran. At the 2006 census, its population was 315, in 77 families.
