= Pij Bon =

Piche Bon پيچ بن
- Village
- Location within Iran
- Coordinates: 36°24′02″N 50°46′35″E
- Country: Iran
- Province: Qazvin
- County: Qazvin
- Bakhsh: Rudbar-e Alamut
- Rural District: Alamut-e Bala

Population (2006)
  - Total: 76
- Time zone: UTC+3:30 (IRST)
  - Summer (DST): UTC+4:30 (IRDT)

Pij Bon (Persian: پيج بن, also Romanized as Pīj Bon; also known as Pīch Bon and Pīchbon) is a village in Alamut-e Pain Rural District, Rudbar-e Alamut District, Qazvin County, Qazvin Province, Iran. At the 2006 census, its population was 76, in 22 families.
