= Sefid Ab, Qazvin =

Sefid Ab سفيداب
- Village
- Location within Iran
- Coordinates: 36°34′05″N 50°20′41″E
- Country: Iran
- Province: Qazvin
- County: Qazvin
- Bakhsh: Alamut-e Gharbi
- Rural District: Rudbar-e Mohammad-e Zamani

Population (2006)
  - Total: 507
- Time zone: UTC+3:30 (IRST)
  - Summer (DST): UTC+4:30 (IRDT)

Sefid Ab (Persian: سفيداب, also Romanized as Sefīd Āb and Safīd Āb) is a village in Rudbar-e Mohammad-e Zamani Rural District, Alamut-e Gharbi District, Qazvin County, Qazvin Province, Iran. As of the 2006 census, its population was 507, in 110 families.
