= Sichanlu =

Sichanlu سي چانلو
- Village
- Location within Iran
- Coordinates: 36°05′01″N 49°32′02″E
- Country: Iran
- Province: Qazvin
- County: Takestan
- Bakhsh: Ziaabad
- Rural District: Dodangeh-ye Olya

Population (2006)
  - Total: 17
- Time zone: UTC+3:30 (IRST)
  - Summer (DST): UTC+4:30 (IRDT)

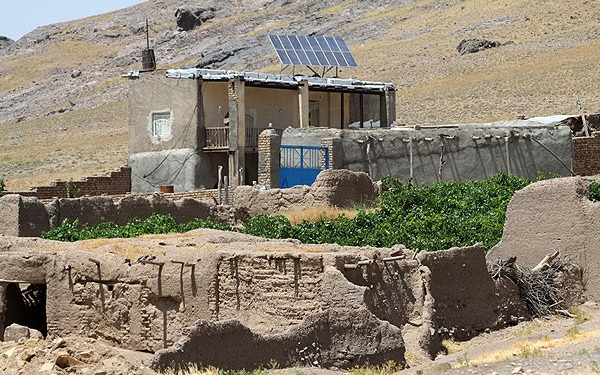
A building and solar panels in Sichanloo

Sichanlu (Persian: سي چانلو, also Romanized as Sīchānlū) is a village in Dodangeh-ye Olya Rural District, Ziaabad District, Takestan County, Qazvin Province, Iran. At the 2006 census, its population was 17, in 5 families.
