= Haft Sanduq =

Haft Sanduq هفت صندوق
- Village
- Location within Iran
- Coordinates: 36°10′25″N 49°29′32″E
- Country: Iran
- Province: Qazvin
- County: Takestan
- Bakhsh: Ziaabad
- Rural District: Dodangeh-ye Olya

Population (2006)
  - Total: 44
- Time zone: UTC+3:30 (IRST)
  - Summer (DST): UTC+4:30 (IRDT)

Haft Sanduq (Persian: هفت صندوق, also Romanized as Haft Şandūq and Khaft-Sanduk) is a village in Dodangeh-ye Olya Rural District, Ziaabad District, Takestan County, Qazvin Province, Iran. At the 2006 census, its population was 44, in 11 families.
