= Zarrinabad, Qazvin =

Zarrinabad زرين آباد
- village
- Interactive map of Zarrinabad
- Coordinates: 36°35′N 49°34′E
- Country: Iran
- Province: Qazvin
- County: Qazvin
- Bakhsh: Tarom Sofla
- Rural District: Kuhgir

Population (2006)
  - Total: 222
- Time zone: UTC+3:30 (IRST)
  - Summer (DST): UTC+4:30 (IRDT)

Zarrinabad (Persian: زرين آباد, also Romanized as Zarrīnābād) is a village in Kuhgir Rural District, Tarom Sofla District, Qazvin County, Qazvin Province, Iran. At the 2006 census, its population was 222, in 47 families.
