= Qazan Chal =

Qazan Chal قزان چال
- Village
- Location within Iran
- Coordinates: 36°03′22″N 50°20′34″E
- Country: Iran
- Province: Qazvin
- County: Abyek
- Bakhsh: Basharyat
- Rural District: Basharyat-e Sharqi

Population (2006)
  - Total: 276
- Time zone: UTC+3:30 (IRST)
  - Summer (DST): UTC+4:30 (IRDT)

Qazan Chal (Persian: قزان چال, also Romanized as Qazān Chāl) is a village in Basharyat-e Sharqi Rural District, Basharyat District, Abyek County, Qazvin Province, Iran. At the 2006 census, its population was 276, in 72 families.
