= Jowladak =

Jowladak جولادك
- Village
- Location within Iran
- Coordinates: 36°22′37″N 50°32′11″E
- Country: Iran
- Province: Qazvin
- County: Qazvin
- Bakhsh: Rudbar-e Alamut
- Rural District: Alamut-e Bala

Population (2006)
  - Total: 78
- Time zone: UTC+3:30 (IRST)
  - Summer (DST): UTC+4:30 (IRDT)

Jowladak (Persian: جولادك, also Romanized as Jowlādak) is a village in Alamut-e Bala Rural District, Rudbar-e Alamut District, Qazvin County, Qazvin Province, Iran. At the 2006 census, its population was 78, in 28 families.
