= Qostin Naheyeh =

Qostin Naheyeh قسطين ناحيه
- Village
- Country: Iran
- Province: Qazvin
- County: Qazvin
- Bakhsh: Alamut-e Gharbi
- Rural District: Rudbar-e Shahrestan

Population (2006)
  - Total: 243
- Time zone: UTC+3:30 (IRST)
  - Summer (DST): UTC+4:30 (IRDT)

Qostin Naheyeh (Persian: قسطين ناحيه, also Romanized as Qosṭīn Nāḥeyeh) is a village in Rudbar-e Shahrestan Rural District, Alamut-e Gharbi District, Qazvin County, Qazvin Province, Iran. At the 2006 census, its population was 243, in 64 families.
