= Atash Anbar =

Atash Anbar اتش انبار
- Village
- Location within Iran
- Coordinates: 35°47′23″N 49°36′51″E
- Country: Iran
- Province: Qazvin
- County: Takestan
- Bakhsh: Khorramdasht
- Rural District: Afshariyeh

Population (2006)
  - Total: 90
- Time zone: UTC+3:30 (IRST)
  - Summer (DST): UTC+4:30 (IRDT)

Atash Anbar (Persian: اتش انبار, also Romanized as Ātash Anbār) is a village in Afshariyeh Rural District, Khorramdasht District, Takestan County, Qazvin Province, Iran. At the 2006 census, its population was 90, in 20 families.
