= Mayan, Qazvin =

Mayan مايان
- Village
- Location within Iran
- Coordinates: 36°13′51″N 49°27′28″E
- Country: Iran
- Province: Qazvin
- County: Takestan
- Bakhsh: Central
- Rural District: Qaqazan-e Gharbi

Population (2006)
  - Total: 124
- Time zone: UTC+3:30 (IRST)
  - Summer (DST): UTC+4:30 (IRDT)

Mayan (Persian: مايان, also Romanized as Māyān; also known as Makasān) is a village in Qaqazan-e Gharbi Rural District, in the Central District of Takestan County, Qazvin Province, Iran. At the 2006 census, its population was 124, in 25 families.
