= Vanash-e Pain =

Vanash-e Pain وناش پائين
- Village
- Location within Iran
- Coordinates: 36°25′52″N 50°41′13″E
- Country: Iran
- Province: Qazvin
- County: Qazvin
- Bakhsh: Rudbar-e Alamut
- Rural District: Alamut-e Pain

Population (2006)
  - Total: 21
- Time zone: UTC+3:30 (IRST)
  - Summer (DST): UTC+4:30 (IRDT)

Vanash-e Pain (Persian: وناش پائين, also Romanized as Vanāsh-e Pā’īn; also known as Vanāsh) is a village in Alamut-e Pain Rural District, Rudbar-e Alamut District, Qazvin County, Qazvin Province, Iran. At the 2006 census, its population was 21, in 7 families.
