= Tuteh Chal =

Tuteh Chal توته چال
- Village
- Location within Iran
- Coordinates: 36°34′07″N 49°57′11″E
- Country: Iran
- Province: Qazvin
- County: Qazvin
- Bakhsh: Alamut-e Gharbi
- Rural District: Dastjerd

Population (2006)
  - Total: 76
- Time zone: UTC+3:30 (IRST)
  - Summer (DST): UTC+4:30 (IRDT)

Tuteh Chal (Persian: توته چال, also Romanized as Tūteh Chāl; also known as Tūtehcheh, Tūteh Chāy, Tūtahchāi, Tutakhchay, and Tūtchāl) is a village in Dastjerd Rural District, Alamut-e Gharbi District, Qazvin County, Qazvin Province, Iran. At the 2006 census, its population was 76, in 20 families.
