= Taratun =

Taratun تراتن
- Village
- Location within Iran
- Coordinates: 36°22′22″N 50°01′11″E
- Country: Iran
- Province: Qazvin
- County: Qazvin
- Bakhsh: Central
- Rural District: Eqbal-e Gharbi

Population (2006)
  - Total: 54
- Time zone: UTC+3:30 (IRST)
  - Summer (DST): UTC+4:30 (IRDT)

Taratun (Persian: تراتن, also Romanized as Tarātūn) is a village in Eqbal-e Gharbi Rural District, in the Central District of Qazvin County, Qazvin Province, Iran. At the 2006 census, its population was 54, in 16 families.
