= Palangeh =

Palangeh پلنگه
- Village
- Location within Iran
- Coordinates: 36°32′02″N 49°17′34″E
- Country: Iran
- Province: Qazvin
- County: Qazvin
- Bakhsh: Tarom Sofla
- Rural District: Khandan

Population (2006)
  - Total: 137
- Time zone: UTC+3:30 (IRST)
  - Summer (DST): UTC+4:30 (IRDT)

Palangeh (Persian: پلنگه, also Romanized as Palangah and Palangakh) is a village in Khandan Rural District, Tarom Sofla District, Qazvin County, Qazvin Province, Iran. At the 2006 census, its population was 137, in 27 families.
