= Daskin =

Daskin داسكين
- Village
- Location within Iran
- Coordinates: 35°41′05″N 49°20′28″E
- Country: Iran
- Province: Qazvin
- County: Avaj
- Bakhsh: Abgarm
- Rural District: Abgarm

Population (2006)
  - Total: 45
- Time zone: UTC+3:30 (IRST)
  - Summer (DST): UTC+4:30 (IRDT)

Daskin (Persian: داسكين, also Romanized as Dāskīn; also known as Dāsjīn) is a village in Abgarm Rural District, Abgarm District, Avaj County, Qazvin Province, Iran. At the 2006 census, its population was 45, in 18 families.
