= Yarafi =

Yarafi يارفي
- Village
- Location within Iran
- Coordinates: 36°23′43″N 50°37′59″E
- Country: Iran
- Province: Qazvin
- County: Qazvin
- Bakhsh: Rudbar-e Alamut
- Rural District: Alamut-e Pain

Population (2006)
  - Total: 70
- Time zone: UTC+3:30 (IRST)
  - Summer (DST): UTC+4:30 (IRDT)

Yarafi (Persian: يارفي, also Romanized as Yārafī‘) is a village in Alamut-e Pain Rural District, Rudbar-e Alamut District, Qazvin County, Qazvin Province, Iran. At the 2006 census, its population was 70, in 27 families.
