= Qarah Qurtan =

Qarah Qurtan قره قورتان
- Village
- Location within Iran
- Coordinates: 35°49′58″N 49°18′39″E
- Country: Iran
- Province: Qazvin
- County: Takestan
- Bakhsh: Ziaabad
- Rural District: Dodangeh-ye Sofla

Population (2006)
  - Total: 117
- Time zone: UTC+3:30 (IRST)
  - Summer (DST): UTC+4:30 (IRDT)

Qarah Qurtan (Persian: قره قورتان, also Romanized as Qarah Qūrtān; also known as Ghara Ghoorkhan, Qarah Qūrqān, Qarāqorqān, Qara Qurghān, Qarā Qūrkhān, Qareh Qorqān, and Qareh Qūrqān) is a village in Dodangeh-ye Sofla Rural District, Ziaabad District, Takestan County, Qazvin Province, Iran. At the 2006 census, its population was 117, in 28 families.
