= Taq Darreh =

Taq Darreh تاق دره
- Village
- Location within Iran
- Coordinates: 36°32′02″N 50°10′44″E
- Country: Iran
- Province: Qazvin
- County: Qazvin
- Bakhsh: Alamut-e Gharbi
- Rural District: Rudbar-e Shahrestan

Population (2006)
  - Total: 41
- Time zone: UTC+3:30 (IRST)
  - Summer (DST): UTC+4:30 (IRDT)

Taq Darreh (Persian: تاق دره, also Romanized as Tāq Darreh; also known as Tāj Darreh) is a village in Rudbar-e Shahrestan Rural District, Alamut-e Gharbi District, Qazvin County, Qazvin Province, Iran. At the 2006 census, its population was 41, in 10 families.
