= Kiseh Jin =

Kiseh Jin كيسه جين
- Village
- Location within Iran
- Coordinates: 35°47′31″N 49°11′32″E
- Country: Iran
- Province: Qazvin
- County: Avaj
- Bakhsh: Abgarm
- Rural District: Abgarm

Population (2006)
  - Total: 213
- Time zone: UTC+3:30 (IRST)
  - Summer (DST): UTC+4:30 (IRDT)

Kiseh Jin (Persian: كيسه جين, also Romanized as Kīseh Jīn; also known as Kesjīn, Kīsajīn, Kīsayīn, Kīsheh Jīn, and Kīsjīn) is a village in Abgarm Rural District, Abgarm District, Avaj County, Qazvin Province, Iran. At the 2006 census, its population was 213, in 55 families.
