= Tavan, Qazvin =

Tavan توان
- Village
- Location within Iran
- Coordinates: 36°27′05″N 50°33′53″E
- Country: Iran
- Province: Qazvin
- County: Qazvin
- Bakhsh: Rudbar-e Alamut
- Rural District: Alamut-e Bala

Population (2006)
  - Total: 73
- Time zone: UTC+3:30 (IRST)
  - Summer (DST): UTC+4:30 (IRDT)

Tavan (Persian: توان, also Romanized as Tavān; also known as Tuwan) is a village in Alamut-e Bala Rural District, Rudbar-e Alamut District, Qazvin County, Qazvin Province, Iran. At the 2006 census, its population was 73, in 26 families.
