= Shangol Rud =

Shangol Rud شنگل رود
- Village
- Location within Iran
- Coordinates: 36°36′46″N 50°18′28″E
- Country: Iran
- Province: Qazvin
- County: Qazvin
- Bakhsh: Alamut-e Gharbi
- Rural District: Rudbar-e Shahrestan

Population (2006)
  - Total: 10
- Time zone: UTC+3:30 (IRST)
  - Summer (DST): UTC+4:30 (IRDT)

Shangal Rud (Persian: شنگل رود, also Romanized as Shangal Rūd; also known as Shangal) is a village in Alamut-e Gharbi District, Qazvin County, Qazvin Province, Iran. At the 2006 census, its population was 10, in 6 families.
