= Yamaqan =

Yamaqan يمقان
- Village
- Location within Iran
- Coordinates: 36°33′41″N 49°04′42″E
- Country: Iran
- Province: Qazvin
- County: Qazvin
- Bakhsh: Tarom Sofla
- Rural District: Chuqur

Population (2006)
  - Total: 77
- Time zone: UTC+3:30 (IRST)
  - Summer (DST): UTC+4:30 (IRDT)

Yamaqan (Persian: يمقان, also Romanized as Yamaqān, Yamagan, and Yamqān; also known as Damqān) is a village in Chuqur Rural District, Tarom Sofla District, Qazvin County, Qazvin province, Iran. At the 2006 census, its population was 77, in 23 families.
