= Sharifabad, Qazvin =

Sharifabad شريف اباد
- Village
- Location within Iran
- Coordinates: 36°24′19″N 50°32′11″E
- Country: Iran
- Province: Qazvin
- County: Qazvin
- Bakhsh: Rudbar-e Alamut
- Rural District: Alamut-e Bala

Population (2006)
  - Total: 126
- Time zone: UTC+3:30 (IRST)
  - Summer (DST): UTC+4:30 (IRDT)

Sharifabad (Persian: شريف اباد, also Romanized as Sharīfābād) is a village in Alamut-e Bala Rural District, Rudbar-e Alamut District, Qazvin County, Qazvin Province, Iran. At the 2006 census, its population was 126, in 35 families.
