= Angur Azuj =

Angur Azuj انگورازوج
- Village
- Location within Iran
- Coordinates: 36°30′39″N 50°07′43″E
- Country: Iran
- Province: Qazvin
- County: Qazvin
- Bakhsh: Alamut-e Gharbi
- Rural District: Rudbar-e Shahrestan

Population (2006)
  - Total: 73
- Time zone: UTC+3:30 (IRST)
  - Summer (DST): UTC+4:30 (IRDT)

Angur Azuj (Persian: انگورازوج, also Romanized as Angūr Āzūj) is a village west Alamut Rural District, Alamut-e Gharbi District, Qazvin County, Qazvin Province, Iran. At the 2006 census, its population was 73, in 25 families.
