= Tian Dasht =

Tian Dasht طياندشت
- Village
- Location within Iran
- Coordinates: 36°34′35″N 49°59′54″E
- Country: Iran
- Province: Qazvin
- County: Qazvin
- Bakhsh: Alamut-e Gharbi
- Rural District: Dastjerd

Population (2006)
  - Total: 97
- Time zone: UTC+3:30 (IRST)
  - Summer (DST): UTC+4:30 (IRDT)

Tian Dasht (Persian: طياندشت, also Romanized as Ţīān Dasht and Ţīāndasht; also known as Tīābash) is a village in Dastjerd Rural District, Alamut-e Gharbi District, Qazvin County, Qazvin Province, Iran. At the 2006 census, its population was 97, in 24 families.
