= Suli Darreh =

Suli Darreh سوليدره
- Village
- Location within Iran
- Coordinates: 36°08′42″N 49°30′48″E
- Country: Iran
- Province: Qazvin
- County: Takestan
- Bakhsh: Ziaabad
- Rural District: Dodangeh-ye Olya

Population (2006)
  - Total: 42
- Time zone: UTC+3:30 (IRST)
  - Summer (DST): UTC+4:30 (IRDT)

Suli Darreh (Persian: سوليدره, also Romanized as Sūlī Darreh, Solū Darreh, Sūlīdareh, and Suli-Darrekh) is a village in Dodangeh-ye Olya Rural District, Ziaabad District, Takestan County, Qazvin Province, Iran. At the 2006 census, its population was 42, in 13 families.
