= Fars Gholan =

Fars Gholan فارس غلان
- Village
- Location within Iran
- Coordinates: 35°39′23″N 49°32′16″E
- Country: Iran
- Province: Qazvin
- County: Avaj
- Bakhsh: Abgarm
- Rural District: Kharaqan-e Sharqi

Population (2006)
  - Total: 27
- Time zone: UTC+3:30 (IRST)
  - Summer (DST): UTC+4:30 (IRDT)

Fars Gholan (Persian: فارس غلان, also Romanized as Fārs Gholān; also known as Fārsī Gholām) is a village in Kharaqan-e Sharqi Rural District, Abgarm District, Avaj County, Qazvin Province, Iran. At the 2006 census, its population was 27, in 8 families.
