= Senjdar =

Senjdar سنجدر
- Village
- Location within Iran
- Coordinates: 35°43′57″N 49°42′26″E
- Country: Iran
- Province: Qazvin
- County: Buin Zahra
- Bakhsh: Ramand
- Rural District: Ramand-e Jonubi

Population (2006)
  - Total: 18
- Time zone: UTC+3:30 (IRST)
  - Summer (DST): UTC+4:30 (IRDT)

Senjdar (Persian: سنجدر, also Romanized as Senjīdar) is a village in Ramand-e Jonubi Rural District, Ramand District, Buin Zahra County, Qazvin Province, Iran. At the 2006 census, its population was 18, in 7 families.
