= Vandar =

Vandar وندر
- Village
- Location within Iran
- Coordinates: 36°11′15″N 50°23′24″E
- Country: Iran
- Province: Qazvin
- County: Abyek
- Bakhsh: Central
- Rural District: Kuhpayeh-e Sharqi

Population (2006)
  - Total: 87
- Time zone: UTC+3:30 (IRST)
  - Summer (DST): UTC+4:30 (IRDT)

Vandar (Persian: وندر, also Romanized as Vanehdar, Vendar, and Winadar; also known as Vamdar Koohpayeh) is a village in Kuhpayeh-e Sharqi Rural District, in the Central District of Abyek County, Qazvin Province, Iran. At the 2006 census, its population was 87, in 30 families.
