= Suli Darreh Darbahan =

Suli Darreh Darbahan سوليدره دربهان
- Village
- Location within Iran
- Coordinates: 36°16′40″N 49°27′40″E
- Country: Iran
- Province: Qazvin
- County: Takestan
- Bakhsh: Central
- Rural District: Qaqazan-e Gharbi

Population (2006)
  - Total: 106
- Time zone: UTC+3:30 (IRST)
  - Summer (DST): UTC+4:30 (IRDT)

Suli Darreh Darbahan (Persian: سوليدره دربهان, also Romanized as Sūlī Darreh Darbahān; also known as Sūleh Dar, Solāḩ Darreh, Sulah Darreh, Sulakh-Darrekh, and Sūlī Darbahān) is a village in Qaqazan-e Gharbi Rural District, in the Central District of Takestan County, Qazvin Province, Iran. At the 2006 census, its population was 106, in 20 families.
