= Mortezaabad, Qazvin =

Mortezaabad مرتضي اباد
- Village
- Location within Iran
- Coordinates: 36°24′37″N 49°47′53″E
- Country: Iran
- Province: Qazvin
- County: Qazvin
- Bakhsh: Kuhin
- Rural District: Ilat-e Qaqazan-e Sharqi

Population (2006)
  - Total: 42
- Time zone: UTC+3:30 (IRST)
  - Summer (DST): UTC+4:30 (IRDT)

Mortezaabad (Persian: مرتضي اباد, also Romanized as Morteẕáābād; also known as Murtuzabad) is a village in Ilat-e Qaqazan-e Sharqi Rural District, Kuhin District, Qazvin County, Qazvin Province, Iran. As per 2006 census, its population was 42, in 12 families.
