= Shabanak =

Shabanak شبانك
- Village
- Location within Iran
- Coordinates: 35°52′41″N 49°23′30″E
- Country: Iran
- Province: Qazvin
- County: Takestan
- Bakhsh: Ziaabad
- Rural District: Dodangeh-ye Sofla

Population (2006)
  - Total: 50
- Time zone: UTC+3:30 (IRST)
  - Summer (DST): UTC+4:30 (IRDT)

Shabanak (Persian: شبانك, also Romanized as Shabānak and Sha’bank) is a village in Dodangeh-ye Sofla Rural District, Ziaabad District, Takestan County, Qazvin Province, Iran. At the 2006 census, its population was 50, in 10 families.
