= Naseri, Qazvin =

Naseri ناصري
- Village
- Location within Iran
- Coordinates: 36°28′14″N 49°30′59″E
- Country: Iran
- Province: Qazvin
- County: Qazvin
- Bakhsh: Kuhin
- Rural District: Ilat-e Qaqazan-e Gharbi

Population (2006)
  - Total: 9
- Time zone: UTC+3:30 (IRST)
  - Summer (DST): UTC+4:30 (IRDT)

Naseri (Persian: ناصري, also Romanized as Nāşerī) is a village in Ilat-e Qaqazan-e Gharbi Rural District, Kuhin District, Qazvin County, Qazvin Province, Iran. At the 2006 census, its population was 9, in 4 families.
