= Yerak =

Village in Qazvin, Iran

Yerak يرك
- Village
- Location within Iran
- Coordinates: 36°21′00″N 50°29′00″E
- Country: Iran
- Province: Qazvin
- County: Qazvin
- Bakhsh: Rudbar-e Alamut
- Rural District: Alamut-e Bala

Population (2006)
  - Total: 112
- Time zone: UTC+3:30 (IRST)

Yerak (Persian: يرك) is a village in Alamut-e Bala Rural District, Rudbar-e Alamut District, Qazvin County, Qazvin Province, Iran. At the 2006 census, its population was 112, in 52 families.
