= Ghoncheh Khoran =

Ghoncheh Khoran غنچه خوران
- Village
- Location within Iran
- Coordinates: 36°26′51″N 49°23′33″E
- Country: Iran
- Province: Qazvin
- County: Qazvin
- Bakhsh: Tarom Sofla
- Rural District: Niyarak

Population (2006)
  - Total: 68
- Time zone: UTC+3:30 (IRST)
  - Summer (DST): UTC+4:30 (IRDT)

Ghoncheh Khoran (Persian: غنچه خوران, also Romanized as Ghoncheh Khorān; also known as Ghonchehkhoran) is a village in Niyarak Rural District, Tarom Sofla District, Qazvin County, Qazvin Province, Iran. At the 2006 census, its population was 68, in 15 families.
