= Azrat =

Azrat ازرت
- Village
- Location within Iran
- Coordinates: 36°26′27″N 50°21′16″E
- Country: Iran
- Province: Qazvin
- County: Qazvin
- Bakhsh: Rudbar-e Alamut
- Rural District: Moallem Kalayeh

Population (2006)
  - Total: 8
- Time zone: UTC+3:30 (IRST)
  - Summer (DST): UTC+4:30 (IRDT)

Azrat (Persian: ازرت) is a village in Moallem Kalayeh Rural District, Rudbar-e Alamut District, Qazvin County, Qazvin Province, Iran. At the 2006 census, its population was 8, in 4 families.
