= Tablshekin =

Tablshekin طبل شكين
- Village
- Location within Iran
- Coordinates: 35°48′49″N 49°04′57″E
- Country: Iran
- Province: Qazvin
- County: Avaj Zahra
- Bakhsh: Central
- Rural District: Hesar-e Valiyeasr

Population (2006)
  - Total: 363
- Time zone: UTC+3:30 (IRST)

Tablshekin (Persian: طبل شكين, also Romanized as Ţablshekīn, Ţablashgīn, and Ţablshekan) is a village in Hesar-e Valiyeasr Rural District, Central District, Avaj County, Qazvin Province, Iran. At the 2006 census, its population was 363, in 80 families. This village is populated by Azerbaijani Turks.
