= Cheshmeh-ye Gholamali =

Cheshmeh-ye Gholamali چشمه غلامعلي
- Village
- Location within Iran
- Coordinates: 36°24′26″N 49°49′27″E
- Country: Iran
- Province: Qazvin
- County: Qazvin
- Bakhsh: Kuhin
- Rural District: Ilat-e Qaqazan-e Sharqi

Population (2006)
  - Total: 401
- Time zone: UTC+3:30 (IRST)
  - Summer (DST): UTC+4:30 (IRDT)

Cheshmeh-ye Gholamali (Persian: چشمه غلامعلي, also Romanized as Cheshmeh-ye Gholām‘alī) is a village in Ilat-e Qaqazan-e Sharqi Rural District, Kuhin District, Qazvin County, Qazvin province, Iran. At the 2006 census, its population was 401, in 101 families.
