= Kalleh Kub =

Kalleh Kub كله كوب
- Village
- Location within Iran
- Coordinates: 36°34′27″N 49°55′57″E
- Country: Iran
- Province: Qazvin
- County: Qazvin
- Bakhsh: Alamut-e Gharbi
- Rural District: Dastjerd

Population (2006)
  - Total: 39
- Time zone: UTC+3:30 (IRST)
  - Summer (DST): UTC+4:30 (IRDT)

Kalleh Kub (Persian: كله كوب, also Romanized as Kalleh Kūb; also known as Kalleh Kūh) is a village in Dastjerd Rural District, Alamut-e Gharbi District, Qazvin County, Qazvin Province, Iran. At the 2006 census, its population was 39, in 7 families.
