= Yuj, Qazvin =

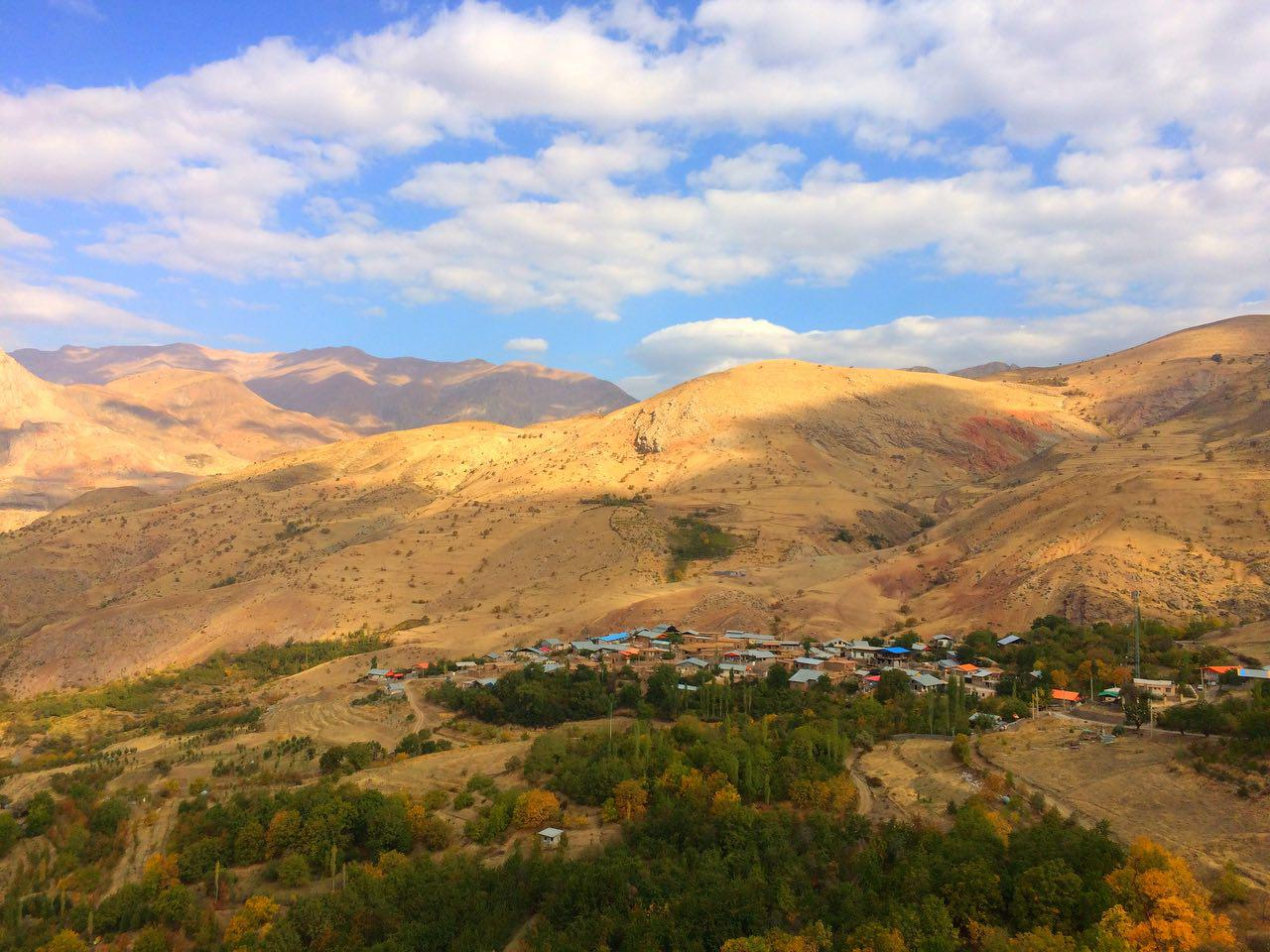
Yuj يوج
- Village
- Location within Iran
- Coordinates: 36°34′03″N 50°16′41″E
- Country: Iran
- Province: Qazvin
- County: Qazvin
- Bakhsh: Alamut-e Gharbi
- Rural District: Rudbar-e alamout

Population (2006)
  - Total: 147
- Time zone: UTC+3:30 (IRST)

Yuj (Persian: يوج, also Romanized as Yūj) is a village in Rudbar-e Alamut Rural District, Alamut-e Gharbi District, Qazvin County, Qazvin Province, Iran. At the 2006 census, its population was 147, in 52 families.
