= Suroshan =

Suroshan سروشان
- Village
- Location within Iran
- Coordinates: 36°30′12″N 49°27′44″E
- Country: Iran
- Province: Qazvin
- County: Qazvin
- Bakhsh: Tarom Sofla
- Rural District: Niyarak

Population (2006)
  - Total: 65
- Time zone: UTC+3:30 (IRST)
  - Summer (DST): UTC+4:30 (IRDT)

Suroshan (Persian: سورشان, also Romanized as Sūroshān and Sorshan; also known as Shūrshānī and Sūrshānī) is a village in Niyarak Rural District, Tarom Sofla District, Qazvin County, Qazvin Province, Iran. At the 2006 census, its population was 65, in 24 families.
