= Qarah Karselu =

Qarah Karselu قره كرسلو
- Village
- Location within Iran
- Coordinates: 36°07′30″N 49°36′47″E
- Country: Iran
- Province: Qazvin
- County: Takestan
- Bakhsh: Central
- Rural District: Qaqazan-e Sharqi

Population (2006)
  - Total: 10
- Time zone: UTC+3:30 (IRST)
  - Summer (DST): UTC+4:30 (IRDT)

Qarah Karselu (Persian: قره كرسلو, also Romanized as Qarah Karselū; also known as Ghara Koosloo, Kara-Kusalu, Qarā Gosālū, Qarā Kūsalū, Qareh Kosālū, Qareh Kūsehlar, and Qareh Kūslū) is a village in Qaqazan-e Sharqi Rural District, in the Central District of Takestan County, Qazvin Province, Iran. At the 2006 census, its population was 10, in 4 families.
