= Rameshan =

Rameshan رامشان
- Village
- Location within Iran
- Coordinates: 36°17′44″N 49°46′20″E
- Country: Iran
- Province: Qazvin
- County: Qazvin
- Bakhsh: Kuhin
- Rural District: Ilat-e Qaqazan-e Sharqi

Population (2006)
  - Total: 431
- Time zone: UTC+3:30 (IRST)
  - Summer (DST): UTC+4:30 (IRDT)

Rameshan (Persian: رامشان, also Romanized as Rāmeshān) is a village in Ilat-e Qaqazan-e Sharqi Rural District, Kuhin District, Qazvin County, Qazvin Province, Iran. At the 2006 census, its population was 431, in 96 families.
