= Gonbadak =

GŪNBAZAK گؤن بزک
- Village
- Location within Iran
- Coordinates: 35°49′31″N 49°16′23″E
- Country: Iran
- Province: Qazvin
- County: Takestan
- Bakhsh: Ziaabad
- Rural District: Dodangeh-ye Sofla

Population (2006)
  - Total: 59
- Time zone: UTC+3:30 (IRST)
  - Summer (DST): UTC+4:30 (IRDT)

Gūnbazak (Azerbaijani: گؤن بزک; Persian: گنبدك also Romanized as Gunbazak) is a village in Dodangeh-ye Sofla Rural District, Ziaabad District, Takestan County, Qazvin Province, Iran. At the 2006 census, its population was 59, in 16 families. It is an Azerbaijani Turkish-speaking village
