= Hasha Kalayeh =

Hasha Kalayeh هاشاكلايه
- Village
- Location within Iran
- Coordinates: 36°34′31″N 50°14′11″E
- Country: Iran
- Province: Qazvin
- County: Qazvin
- Bakhsh: Alamut-e Gharbi
- Rural District: Rudbar-e Shahrestan

Population (2006)
  - Total: 20
- Time zone: UTC+3:30 (IRST)
  - Summer (DST): UTC+4:30 (IRDT)

Hasha Kalayeh (Persian: هاشاكلايه, also Romanized as Ḩāshā Kalāyeh) is a village in Rudbar-e Shahrestan Rural District, Alamut-e Gharbi District, Qazvin County, Qazvin Province, Iran. At the 2006 census, its population was 20, in 5 families.
