= Shafiabad (36°20′ N 50°05′ E), Qazvin =

Shafiabad شفيع اباد
- Village
- Location within Iran
- Coordinates: 36°20′11″N 50°05′27″E
- Country: Iran
- Province: Qazvin
- County: Qazvin
- Bakhsh: Central
- Rural District: Eqbal-e Gharbi

Population (2006)
  - Total: 483
- Time zone: UTC+3:30 (IRST)
  - Summer (DST): UTC+4:30 (IRDT)

Shafiabad (Persian: شفيع اباد, also Romanized as Shafī‘ābād) is a village in Eqbal-e Gharbi Rural District, in the Central District of Qazvin County, Qazvin Province, Iran. At the 2006 census, its population was 483, in 125 families.
