= Narendeh =

Narendeh نارنده
- Village
- Location within Iran
- Coordinates: 36°30′04″N 49°45′48″E
- Country: Iran
- Province: Qazvin
- County: Qazvin
- Bakhsh: Kuhin
- Rural District: Ilat-e Qaqazan-e Sharqi

Population (2006)
  - Total: 83
- Time zone: UTC+3:30 (IRST)
  - Summer (DST): UTC+4:30 (IRDT)

Narendeh (Persian: نارنده, also Romanized as Nārendeh, Nārandeh; also known as Nārenshed, Nārīndeh, and Narin-Dekh) is a village in Ilat-e Qaqazan-e Sharqi Rural District, Kuhin District, Qazvin County, Qazvin Province, Iran. At the 2006 census, its population was 83, in 35 families.
