= Meshaneh =

Meshaneh مشانه
- Village
- Location within Iran
- Coordinates: 35°35′46″N 49°07′24″E
- Country: Iran
- Province: Qazvin
- County: Avaj
- Bakhsh: Central
- Rural District: Shahidabad

Population (2006)
  - Total: 108
- Time zone: UTC+3:30 (IRST)

Meshaneh (Persian: مشانه, also Romanized as Meshāneh) is a village in Shahidabad Rural District, Central District, Avaj County, Qazvin Province, Iran. At the 2006 census, its population was 108, in 36 families.
