= Emamzadeh Harun =

Emamzadeh Harun امامزاده هارون
- Village
- Location within Iran
- Coordinates: 36°34′07″N 50°08′10″E
- Country: Iran
- Province: Qazvin
- County: Qazvin
- Bakhsh: Alamut-e Gharbi
- Rural District: Rudbar-e Shahrestan

Population (2006)
  - Total: 30
- Time zone: UTC+3:30 (IRST)
  - Summer (DST): UTC+4:30 (IRDT)

Emamzadeh Harun (Persian: امامزاده هارون, also Romanized as Emāmzādeh Hārūn) is a village in Rudbar-e Shahrestan Rural District, Alamut-e Gharbi District, Qazvin County, Qazvin Province, Iran. At the 2006 census, its population was 30, in 9 families.
