= Qaleh-ye Jangi =

Village in Qazvin province, Iran

Qaleh-ye Jangi Persian: قلعه گنجی
- Village
- Location within Iran
- Coordinates: 35°49′00″N 49°51′38″E
- Country: Iran
- Province: Qazvin
- County: Buin Zahra
- District: Ramand
- Rural District: Ebrahimabad

Population (2016)
  - Total: 425
- Time zone: UTC+3:30 (IRST)

Qaleh-ye Jangi (Persian: قلعه گنجی) (Note: Also romanized as Qal‘eh-ye Jangī) is a village in Ebrahimabad Rural District of Ramand District in Buin Zahra County, Qazvin province, Iran.

== Demographics ==
=== Population ===
At the time of the 2006 National Census, the village's population was 316 in 95 households. The following census in 2011 counted 246 people in 87 households. The 2016 census measured the population of the village as 425 people in 144 households.
