= Jutan =

Jutan جوتان
- Village
- Location within Iran
- Coordinates: 36°21′42″N 50°28′41″E
- Country: Iran
- Province: Qazvin
- County: Qazvin
- Bakhsh: Rudbar-e Alamut
- Rural District: Alamut-e Bala

Population (2006)
  - Total: 62
- Time zone: UTC+3:30 (IRST)
  - Summer (DST): UTC+4:30 (IRDT)

Jutan (Persian: جوتان, also Romanized as Jūtān) is a village in Alamut-e Bala Rural District, Rudbar-e Alamut District, Qazvin County, Qazvin Province, Iran. At the 2006 census, its population was 62, in 30 families.
