= Shisheh Qaleh =

Shisheh Qaleh شيشه قلعه
- Village
- Location within Iran
- Coordinates: 36°00′02″N 49°58′54″E
- Country: Iran
- Province: Qazvin
- County: Buin Zahra
- Bakhsh: Central
- Rural District: Zahray-ye Bala

Population (2006)
  - Total: 156
- Time zone: UTC+3:30 (IRST)
  - Summer (DST): UTC+4:30 (IRDT)

Shisheh Qaleh (Persian: شيشه قلعه, also Romanized as Shīsheh Qal‘eh) is a village in Zahray-ye Bala Rural District, in the Central District of Buin Zahra County, Qazvin Province, Iran. At the 2006 census, its population was 156, in 41 families.
