= Bala Khanlu =

Bala Khanlu بالاخانلو
- Village
- Location within Iran
- Coordinates: 35°37′58″N 49°46′40″E
- Country: Iran
- Province: Qazvin
- County: Buin Zahra
- Bakhsh: Central
- Rural District: Sagezabad

Population (2006)
  - Total: 32
- Time zone: UTC+3:30 (IRST)
  - Summer (DST): UTC+4:30 (IRDT)

Bala Khanlu (Persian: بالاخانلو, also Romanized as Bālā Khānlū) is a village in Sagezabad Rural District, in the Central District of Buin Zahra County, Qazvin Province, Iran. At the 2006 census, its population was 32, in 7 families.
