= Maliabad =

Maliabad مالی‌آباد
- Village
- Location within Iran
- Coordinates: 36°04′57″N 50°21′35″E
- Country: Iran
- Province: Qazvin
- County: Abyek
- Bakhsh: Basharyat
- Rural District: Basharyat-e Sharqi

Population (2006)
  - Total: 118
- Time zone: UTC+3:30 (IRST)
  - Summer (DST): UTC+4:30 (IRDT)

Maliabad (Persian: مالی‌آباد, also Romanized as Mālīābād) is a village in Basharyat-e Sharqi Rural District, Basharyat District, Abyek County, Qazvin Province, Iran. At the 2006 census, its population was 118, in 28 families.
