= Niaq =

Niaq نياق
- Village
- Location within Iran
- Coordinates: 36°23′56″N 50°03′03″E
- Country: Iran
- Province: Qazvin
- County: Qazvin
- Bakhsh: Central
- Rural District: Eqbal-e Gharbi

Population (2006)
  - Total: 191
- Time zone: UTC+3:30 (IRST)
  - Summer (DST): UTC+4:30 (IRDT)

Niaq (Persian: نياق, also Romanized as Nīāq) is a village in Eqbal-e Gharbi Rural District, in the Central District of Qazvin County, Qazvin Province, Iran. At the 2006 census, its population was 191, in 58 families.
