= Qaleh-ye Qareh Dash =

Qaleh-ye Qareh Dash قلعه قره داش
- Village
- Location within Iran
- Coordinates: 36°09′21″N 49°36′03″E
- Country: Iran
- Province: Qazvin
- County: Takestan
- Bakhsh: Central
- Rural District: Qaqazan-e Sharqi

Population (2006)
  - Total: 181
- Time zone: UTC+3:30 (IRST)
  - Summer (DST): UTC+4:30 (IRDT)

Qaleh-ye Qareh Dash (Persian: قلعه قره داش, also Romanized as Qal‘eh-ye Qareh Dāsh) is a village in Qaqazan-e Sharqi Rural District, in the Central District of Takestan County, Qazvin Province, Iran. At the 2006 census, its population was 181, in 52 families.
