= Yengi Kahriz =

Village in Qazvin province, Iran

Yengi Kahriz Persian: ينگي كهريز
- Village
- Location within Iran
- Coordinates: 35°43′27″N 49°46′07″E
- Country: Iran
- Province: Qazvin
- County: Buin Zahra
- District: Ramand
- Rural District: Ebrahimabad

Population (2016)
  - Total: 213
- Time zone: UTC+3:30 (IRST)

Yengi Kahriz (Persian: ينگي كهريز) (Note: Also romanized as Yang Kārīz, Yang-ī-Kārīz, Yangī Kahrīz, and Yengī Kahrīz; also known as Yangī Gahrīz,) is a village in Ebrahimabad Rural District of Ramand District in Buin Zahra County, Qazvin province, Iran.

== Demographics ==
=== Population ===
At the time of the 2006 National Census, the village's population was 173 in 48 households. The following census in 2011 counted 144 people in 41 households. The 2016 census measured the population of the village as 213 people in 64 households.
