= Arbedian =

Arbedian اربديان
- Village
- Location within Iran
- Coordinates: 36°34′16″N 50°05′14″E
- Country: Iran
- Province: Qazvin
- County: Qazvin
- Bakhsh: Alamut-e Gharbi
- Rural District: Dastjerd

Population (2006)
  - Total: 60
- Time zone: UTC+3:30 (IRST)
  - Summer (DST): UTC+4:30 (IRDT)

Arbedian (Persian: اربديان, also Romanized as ‘Arbedīān and Arbīdīān) is a village in Dastjerd Rural District, Alamut-e Gharbi District, Qazvin County, Qazvin Province, Iran. At the 2006 census, its population was 60, in 15 families.
