= Sefiddar =

Sefiddar سفيددر
- Village
- Location within Iran
- Coordinates: 36°23′11″N 50°37′11″E
- Country: Iran
- Province: Qazvin
- County: Qazvin
- Bakhsh: Rudbar-e Alamut
- Rural District: Alamut-e Pain

Population (2006)
  - Total: 78
- Time zone: UTC+3:30 (IRST)
  - Summer (DST): UTC+4:30 (IRDT)

Sefiddar (Persian: سفيددر, also Romanized as Sefīddar) is a village in Alamut-e Pain Rural District, Rudbar-e Alamut District, Qazvin County, Qazvin Province, Iran. At the 2006 census, its population was 78, in 21 families.
