= Il Chupan =

Il Chupan ايل چوپان
- Village
- Location within Iran
- Coordinates: 36°29′06″N 49°26′40″E
- Country: Iran
- Province: Qazvin
- County: Qazvin
- Bakhsh: Tarom Sofla
- Rural District: Niyarak

Population (2006)
  - Total: 23
- Time zone: UTC+3:30 (IRST)
  - Summer (DST): UTC+4:30 (IRDT)

Il Chupan (Persian: ايل چوپان, also Romanized as Il Chūpān; also known as Ilchapan) is a village in Niyarak Rural District, Tarom Sofla District, Qazvin County, Qazvin Province, Iran. At the 2006 census, its population was 23, in 5 families.
