= Yam Cheshmeh =

Yam Cheshmeh منزل مجیــد @shaaaaah64 یـــام چشمـــــٓـــه يام چشمه
- village
- Location within Iran
- Coordinates: 35°56′59″N 49°22′48″E
- Country: Iran
- Province: Qazvin
- County: Takestan
- Bakhsh: Ziaabad
- Rural District: Dodangeh-ye Olya

Population (2006)
  - Total: 50
- Time zone: UTC+3:30 (IRST)
  - Summer (DST): UTC+4:30 (IRDT)

Yam Cheshmeh (Persian: يام چشمه, also Romanized as Yām Cheshmeh and Yām Chashmeh; also known as Yān Chashmeh) is a village in Dodangeh-ye Olya Rural District, Ziaabad District, Takestan County, Qazvin Province, Iran. At the 2006 census, its population was 50, in 14 families.
