= Burmanak =

Burmanak بورمانك
- Village
- Location within Iran
- Coordinates: 36°35′16″N 49°23′01″E
- Country: Iran
- Province: Qazvin
- County: Qazvin
- Bakhsh: Tarom Sofla
- Rural District: Niyarak

Population (2016)
  - Total: 117
- Time zone: UTC+3:30 (IRST)
  - Summer (DST): UTC+4:30 (IRDT)

Burmanak (Persian: بورمانك, also Romanized as Būrmānak and Boormanak; also known as Bormānakī, Būryānak, Loshgin, Loshjīn, and Lūshgīn) is a village in Niyarak Rural District, Tarom Sofla District, Qazvin County, Qazvin Province, Iran. At the 2016 census, its population was 117 in 28 families.
