= Kordandeh =

Kordandeh كردانده
- Village
- Location within Iran
- Coordinates: 36°32′05″N 49°49′28″E
- Country: Iran
- Province: Qazvin
- County: Qazvin
- Bakhsh: Kuhin
- Rural District: Ilat-e Qaqazan-e Sharqi

Population (2006)
  - Total: 92
- Time zone: UTC+3:30 (IRST)
  - Summer (DST): UTC+4:30 (IRDT)

Kordandeh (Persian: كردانده, also Romanized as Kordāndeh, Khūrdandeh, Kurdandeh, and Kurdan-Dekh) is a village in Ilat-e Qaqazan-e Sharqi Rural District, Kuhin District, Qazvin County, Qazvin Province, Iran. At the 2006 census, its population was 92, in 22 families. This village is populated by Azerbaijani Turks.
