= Aqagir =

Aqagir اقاگير
- Village
- Location within Iran
- Coordinates: 36°22′18″N 50°23′56″E
- Country: Iran
- Province: Qazvin
- County: Qazvin
- Bakhsh: Rudbar-e Alamut
- Rural District: Alamut-e Bala

Population (2006)
  - Total: 108
- Time zone: UTC+3:30 (IRST)
  - Summer (DST): UTC+4:30 (IRDT)

Aqagir (Persian: اقاگير, also Romanized as Āqāgīr) is a village in Alamut-e Bala Rural District, Rudbar-e Alamut District, Qazvin County, Qazvin Province, Iran. At the 2006 census, its population was 108, in 36 families.
