= Simiyar Dasht =

Simiyar Dasht سيمياردشت
- Village
- Location within Iran
- Coordinates: 36°28′26″N 50°18′39″E
- Country: Iran
- Province: Qazvin
- County: Qazvin
- Bakhsh: Alamut-e Gharbi
- Rural District: Rudbar-e Mohammad-e Zamani

Population (2006)
  - Total: 23
- Time zone: UTC+3:30 (IRST)
  - Summer (DST): UTC+4:30 (IRDT)

Simiyar Dasht (Persian: سيمياردشت, also Romanized as Semyār Dasht) is a village in Rudbar-e Mohammad-e Zamani Rural District, Alamut-e Gharbi District, Qazvin County, Qazvin Province, Iran. At the 2006 census, its population was 23, in 7 families.
