= Baghalduz-e Olya =

Baghalduz-e Olya بغل دوزعليا
- Village
- Location within Iran
- Coordinates: 36°34′00″N 49°21′00″E
- Country: Iran
- Province: Qazvin
- County: Qazvin
- Bakhsh: Tarom Sofla
- Rural District: Khandan

Population (2006)
  - Total: 61
- Time zone: UTC+3:30 (IRST)
  - Summer (DST): UTC+4:30 (IRDT)

Baghalduz-e Olya (Persian: بغل دوزعليا, also Romanized as Baghaldūz-e ‘Olyā) is a village in Khandan Rural District, Tarom Sofla District, Qazvin County, Qazvin Province, Iran. At the 2006 census, its population was 61, in 20 families.
