= Owzun Darreh, Qazvin =

Owzun Darreh اوزون دره
- Village
- Location within Iran
- Coordinates: 36°21′47″N 49°54′03″E
- Country: Iran
- Province: Qazvin
- County: Qazvin
- Bakhsh: Central
- Rural District: Eqbal-e Gharbi

Population (2006)
  - Total: 269
- Time zone: UTC+3:30 (IRST)
  - Summer (DST): UTC+4:30 (IRDT)

Owzun Darreh (Persian: اوزون دره, also Romanized as Owzūn Darreh, Ozūn Darreh, Ūzondarreh, Ūzūn Darreh, and Uzun-Darrekh; also known as Azūndezeh) is a village in Eqbal-e Gharbi Rural District, in the Central District of Qazvin County, Qazvin Province, Iran. At the 2006 census, its population was 269, in 73 families.
