= Qeshlaq-e Hajjiabad-e Olya =

Qeshlaq-e Hajjiabad-e Olya قشلاق حاجي ابادعليا
- Village
- Location within Iran
- Coordinates: 35°35′31″N 49°53′09″E
- Country: Iran
- Province: Qazvin
- County: Buin Zahra
- Bakhsh: Central
- Rural District: Sagezabad

Population (2006)
  - Total: 94
- Time zone: UTC+3:30 (IRST)
  - Summer (DST): UTC+4:30 (IRDT)

Qeshlaq-e Hajjiabad-e Olya (Persian: قشلاق حاجي ابادعليا, also Romanized as Qeshlāq-e Ḩājjīābād-e ‘Olyā; also known as Qeshlāq-e Ḩājjīābād and Qeshlāq-e Ḩājjīābād-e Bālā) is a village in Sagezabad Rural District, in the Central District of Buin Zahra County, Qazvin Province, Iran. At the 2006 census, its population was 94, in 21 families.
