= Gol Zamin =

Gol Zamin گل زميين
- Village
- Location within Iran
- Coordinates: 35°33′05″N 49°30′15″E
- Country: Iran
- Province: Qazvin
- County: Avaj
- Bakhsh: Abgarm
- Rural District: Kharaqan-e Sharqi

Population (2006)
  - Total: 272
- Time zone: UTC+3:30 (IRST)
  - Summer (DST): UTC+4:30 (IRDT)

Gol Zamin (Persian: گل زميين, also Romanized as Gol Zamīn; also known as Gāv Zamīn) is a village in Kharaqan-e Sharqi Rural District, Abgarm District, Avaj County, Qazvin Province, Iran. At the 2006 census, its population was 272, in 59 families.
