= Haladar =

Haladar هلدر
- Village
- Location within Iran
- Coordinates: 35°38′34″N 49°18′54″E
- Country: Iran
- Province: Qazvin
- County: Avaj
- Bakhsh: Abgarm
- Rural District: Abgarm

Population (2006)
  - Total: 84
- Time zone: UTC+3:30 (IRST)
  - Summer (DST): UTC+4:30 (IRDT)

Haladar (Persian: هلدر, also Romanized as Haledar and A‘alādar; also known as Aladā) is a village in Abgarm Rural District, Abgarm District, Avaj County, Qazvin Province, Iran. At the 2006 census, its population was 84, in 26 families.
