= Kur Cheshmeh, Qazvin =

Kur Cheshmeh كورچشمه
- Village
- Location within Iran
- Coordinates: 35°41′56″N 49°34′36″E
- Country: Iran
- Province: Qazvin
- County: Takestan
- Bakhsh: Khorramdasht
- Rural District: Afshariyeh

Population (2006)
  - Total: 361
- Time zone: UTC+3:30 (IRST)
  - Summer (DST): UTC+4:30 (IRDT)

Kur Cheshmeh (Persian: كورچشمه, also Romanized as Kūr Cheshmeh and Kūr Chashmeh) is a village in Afshariyeh Rural District, Khorramdasht District, Takestan County, Qazvin Province, Iran. At the 2006 census, its population was 361, in 81 families.
