= Arqih =

Arqih ارقيه
- Village
- Location within Iran
- Coordinates: 35°36′28″N 49°16′03″E
- Country: Iran
- Province: Qazvin
- County: Avaj
- Bakhsh: Central
- Rural District: Shahidabad

Population (2006)
  - Total: 72
- Time zone: UTC+3:30 (IRST)

Arqih (Persian: ارقيه, also Romanized as Ārqīh and Arghāy) is a village in Shahidabad Rural District, Central District, Avaj County, Qazvin Province, Iran. At the 2006 census, its population was 72, in 23 families.
