= Alnaqiyah =

Alnaqiyah علنقيه
- Village
- Location within Iran
- Coordinates: 36°09′54″N 49°38′17″E
- Country: Iran
- Province: Qazvin
- County: Takestan
- Bakhsh: Central
- Rural District: Qaqazan-e Sharqi

Population (2006)
  - Total: 252
- Time zone: UTC+3:30 (IRST)
  - Summer (DST): UTC+4:30 (IRDT)

Alnaqiyah (Persian: علنقيه, also Romanized as ‘Alnaqīyah, Alanghiyeh, Alanqayah, ‘Alanqayeh, ‘Alīngīyeh, and ‘Alīnqayeh; also known as Alangir) is a village in Qaqazan-e Sharqi Rural District, in the Central District of Takestan County, Qazvin Province, Iran. At the 2006 census, its population was 252, in 71 families.
