= Sholomeh =

Sholomeh شولومه
- Village
- Location within Iran
- Coordinates: 36°39′22″N 49°08′23″E
- Country: Iran
- Province: Qazvin
- County: Qazvin
- Bakhsh: Tarom Sofla
- Rural District: Khandan

Population (2006)
  - Total: 75
- Time zone: UTC+3:30 (IRST)
  - Summer (DST): UTC+4:30 (IRDT)

Sholomeh (Persian: شولومه, also Romanized as Cholombeh, Chālomāh, Chalummah, Chulumbakh, Sholombeh, and Showlowmbeh) is a village in Khandan Rural District, Tarom Sofla District, Qazvin County, Qazvin Province, Iran. In the 2006 census, its population was 75, in 12 families.
