= Meymunak =

Meymunak ميمونك
- Village
- Location within Iran
- Coordinates: 36°40′04″N 49°04′34″E
- Country: Iran
- Province: Qazvin
- County: Qazvin
- Bakhsh: Tarom Sofla
- Rural District: Khandan

Population (2006)
  - Total: 15
- Time zone: UTC+3:30 (IRST)
  - Summer (DST): UTC+4:30 (IRDT)

Meymunak (Persian: ميمونك, also romanized as Meymūnak) is a village in Khandan Rural District, Tarom Sofla District, Qazvin County, Qazvin Province, Iran. At the 2006 census, its population was 15, in 4 families.
