= Kebrit Mian =

Kian Dasht کیان دشت
- Village
- Location within Iran
- Coordinates: 36°13′59″N 50°15′39″E
- Country: Iran
- Province: Qazvin
- County: Alborz
- Bakhsh: Mohammadiyeh
- Rural District: Hesar Kharvan

Population (2006)
  - Total: 94
- Time zone: UTC+3:30 (IRST)
  - Summer (DST): UTC+4:30 (IRDT)

Kian Dasht (Persian: کیان دشت, also Romanized as Kīan Dasht and KianDasht) is a village in Hesar Kharvan Rural District, Mohammadiyeh District, Alborz County, Qazvin Province, Iran. At the 2006 census, its population was 94, in 33 families.
