= Judaki =

Judaki جودكي
- Village
- Location within Iran
- Coordinates: 36°46′56″N 49°14′46″E
- Country: Iran
- Province: Qazvin
- County: Qazvin
- Bakhsh: Tarom Sofla
- Rural District: Khandan

Population (2006)
  - Total: 155
- Time zone: UTC+3:30 (IRST)
  - Summer (DST): UTC+4:30 (IRDT)

Judaki (Persian: جودكي, also romanized as Jūdakī) is a village in Khandan Rural District, Tarom Sofla District, Qazvin County, Qazvin Province, Iran. At the 2006 census its population was 155, in 29 families.
