= Kachaleh Gerd =

Village in Qazvin province, Iran

Kachaleh Gerd Persian: كچله گرد
- Village
- Location within Iran
- Coordinates: 35°59′27″N 49°52′44″E
- Country: Iran
- Province: Qazvin
- County: Buin Zahra
- District: Dashtabi
- Rural District: Dashtabi-ye Gharbi

Population (2016)
  - Total: 759
- Time zone: UTC+3:30 (IRST)

Kachaleh Gerd (Persian: كچله گرد) (Note: Also romanized as Kachleh Gerd; also known as Kachal Gerd, Kachleh Jerd, and Kachliyird) is a village in Dashtabi-ye Gharbi Rural District of Dashtabi District in Buin Zahra County, Qazvin province, Iran.

== Demographics ==
=== Population ===
At the time of the 2006 National Census, the village's population was 852 in 184 households. The following census in 2011 counted 945 people in 246 households. The 2016 census measured the population of the village as 759 people in 222 households.
