= Suteh Kosh =

Suteh Kosh سوته كش
- Village
- Location within Iran
- Coordinates: 36°29′25″N 50°05′25″E
- Country: Iran
- Province: Qazvin
- County: Qazvin
- Bakhsh: Central
- Rural District: Eqbal-e Gharbi

Population (2006)
  - Total: 168
- Time zone: UTC+3:30 (IRST)
  - Summer (DST): UTC+4:30 (IRDT)

Suteh Kosh (Persian: سوته كش, also Romanized as Sūteh Kosh and Sooteh Kosh) is a village in Eqbal-e Gharbi Rural District, in the Central District of Qazvin County, Qazvin Province, Iran. At the 2006 census, its population was 168, in 50 families.
