= Kia Kalayeh-ye Olya =

Kia Kalayeh-ye Olya کياکلايه عليا
- Village
- Location within Iran
- Coordinates: 36°32′00″N 50°12′00″E
- Country: Iran
- Province: Qazvin
- County: Qazvin
- Bakhsh: Alamut-e Gharbi
- Rural District: Rudbar-e Shahrestan

Population (2006)
  - Total: 29
- Time zone: UTC+3:30 (IRST)
  - Summer (DST): UTC+4:30 (IRDT)

Kia Kalayeh-ye Olya (Persian: کياکلايه عليا, also Romanized as Kīā Kalāyeh-ye ‘Olyā; also known as Kīā Kalāyeh) is a village in Rudbar-e Shahrestan Rural District, Alamut-e Gharbi District, Qazvin County, Qazvin Province, Iran. At the 2006 census, its population was 29, in 5 families.
