= Qaleh-ye Shohadad =

Village in Qazvin, Iran

Qaleh-ye Shohadad قلعه شهداڈ
- Village
- Location within Iran
- Coordinates: 35°47′19″N 49°19′31″E
- Country: Iran
- Province: Qazvin
- County: Takestan
- Bakhsh: Ziaabad
- Rural District: Dodangeh-ye Sofla

Population (2006)
  - Total: 154
- Time zone: UTC+3:30 (IRST)
  - Summer (DST): UTC+4:30 (IRDT)

Qaleh-ye Shohadad (Persian: قلعه شهداڈ, also Romanized as Qal‘eh-ye Shohadāɖ; also known as Qal‘eh-ye Shohadā) is a village in Dodangeh-ye Sofla Rural District, Ziaabad District, Takestan County, Qazvin Province, Iran. At the 2006 census, its population was 154 and included 48 families.
