= Qeshlaq-e Moranlu =

Qeshlaq-e Moranlu قشلاق مرانلو
- Village
- Location within Iran
- Coordinates: 35°55′28″N 50°04′19″E
- Country: Iran
- Province: Qazvin
- County: Buin Zahra
- Bakhsh: Central
- Rural District: Zahray-ye Bala

Population (2006)
  - Total: 569
- Time zone: UTC+3:30 (IRST)
  - Summer (DST): UTC+4:30 (IRDT)

Qeshlaq-e Moranlu (Persian: قشلاق مرانلو, also Romanized as Qeshlāq-e Morānlū and Qeshlāq-e Mūrānlū; also known as Nūralū) is a village in Zahray-ye Bala Rural District, in the Central District of Buin Zahra County, Qazvin Province, Iran. At the 2006 census, its population was 569, in 130 families.
