= Vosuqabad =

Neighborhood in Qazvin province, Iran

Vosuqabad Persian: وثوق‌آباد
- Neighborhood
- Location within Iran
- Coordinates: 36°17′58″N 50°03′45″E
- Country: Iran
- Province: Qazvin
- County: Qazvin
- District: Central
- City: Qazvin

Population (2011)
  - Total: 593
- Time zone: UTC+3:30 (IRST)

Vosuqabad (Persian: وثوق‌آباد) (Note: Also Romanized as Vos̄ūqābād) is a neighborhood in the city of Qazvin in the Central District of Qazvin County, Qazvin province, Iran.

== Demographics ==
=== Population ===
At the time of the 2006 National Census, Vosuqabad's population was 452 in 113 households, when it was a village in Eqbal-e Sharqi Rural District. The following census in 2011 counted 593 people in 170 households. The village was annexed to the city of Qazvin in 2015.
