= Jir Duzan =

Jir Duzan جيردوزان
- Village
- Location within Iran
- Coordinates: 36°35′44″N 49°55′42″E
- Country: Iran
- Province: Qazvin
- County: Qazvin
- Bakhsh: Alamut-e Gharbi
- Rural District: Dastjerd

Population (2006)
  - Total: 53
- Time zone: UTC+3:30 (IRST)
  - Summer (DST): UTC+4:30 (IRDT)

Jir Duzan (Persian: جيردوزان, also Romanized as Jīr Dūzān and Jīrdūzān; also known as Jīr Dezdān) is a village in Dastjerd Rural District, Alamut-e Gharbi District, Qazvin County, Qazvin Province, Iran. At the 2006 census, its population was 53, in 10 families.
