= Sefideh Kash =

Sefideh Kash سفيده كش
- Village
- Location within Iran
- Coordinates: 36°23′11″N 49°55′09″E
- Country: Iran
- Province: Qazvin
- County: Qazvin
- Bakhsh: Central
- Rural District: Eqbal-e Gharbi

Population (2006)
  - Total: 270
- Time zone: UTC+3:30 (IRST)
  - Summer (DST): UTC+4:30 (IRDT)

Sefideh Kash (Persian: سفيده كش, also Romanized as Sefīdeh Kash and Sefīdehkesh) is a village in Eqbal-e Gharbi Rural District, in the Central District of Qazvin County, Qazvin Province, Iran. At the 2006 census, its population was 270, in 55 families.
