= Abkhoreh =

Abkhvoreh ابخوره
- Village
- Location within Iran
- Coordinates: 36°07′08″N 49°54′51″E
- Country: Iran
- Province: Qazvin
- County: Buin Zahra
- Bakhsh: Dashtabi
- Rural District: Dashtabi-ye Sharqi

Population (2006)
  - Total: 333
- Time zone: UTC+3:30 (IRST)
  - Summer (DST): UTC+4:30 (IRDT)

Abkhvoreh (Persian: ابخوره, also Romanized as Ābkhvoreh, Abkhura, and Ābkhūreh) is a village in Dashtabi-ye Sharqi Rural District, Dashtabi District, Buin Zahra County, Qazvin Province, Iran. At the 2006 census, its population was 333, in 86 families.
