= Shahrbaz =

Shahrbaz شهرباز
- Village
- Location within Iran
- Coordinates: 35°48′40″N 48°48′51″E
- Country: Iran
- Province: Qazvin
- County: Avaj
- Bakhsh: Central
- Rural District: Hesar-e Valiyeasr

Population (2006)
  - Total: 101
- Time zone: UTC+3:30 (IRST)

Shahrbaz (Persian: شهرباز, also Romanized as Shahrbāz) is a village in Hesar-e Valiyeasr Rural District, Central District, Avaj County, Qazvin Province, Iran. At the 2006 census, its population was 101, in 21 families.
