= Namakin =

Namakin نمكين
- Village
- Location within Iran
- Coordinates: 36°45′46″N 49°10′52″E
- Country: Iran
- Province: Qazvin
- County: Qazvin
- Bakhsh: Tarom Sofla
- Rural District: Khandan

Population (2006)
  - Total: 81
- Time zone: UTC+3:30 (IRST)
  - Summer (DST): UTC+4:30 (IRDT)

Namakin (Persian: نمكين, also Romanized as Namakīn) is a village in Khandan Rural District, Tarom Sofla District, Qazvin County, Qazvin Province, Iran. During the 2006 census, its population was at 81 people, divided into in 20 families.
