= Kikhanan =

Kikhanan كيخنان
- Village
- Location within Iran
- Coordinates: 36°23′34″N 49°47′48″E
- Country: Iran
- Province: Qazvin
- County: Qazvin
- Bakhsh: Kuhin
- Rural District: Ilat-e Qaqazan-e Sharqi

Population (2006)
  - Total: 435
- Time zone: UTC+3:30 (IRST)
  - Summer (DST): UTC+4:30 (IRDT)

Kikhanan (Persian: كيخنان, also Romanized as Kīkhanān) is a village in Ilat-e Qaqazan-e Sharqi Rural District, Kuhin District, Qazvin County, Qazvin Province, Iran. At the 2006 census, its population was 435, in 92 families.
