= Kushk Dar =

Kushk Dar كوشكدر
- Village
- Location within Iran
- Coordinates: 36°32′09″N 50°14′55″E
- Country: Iran
- Province: Qazvin
- County: Qazvin
- Bakhsh: Alamut-e Gharbi
- Rural District: Rudbar-e Shahrestan

Population (2006)
  - Total: 117
- Time zone: UTC+3:30 (IRST)
  - Summer (DST): UTC+4:30 (IRDT)

Kushk Dar (Persian: كوشكدر, also Romanized as Kūshḵ Dar and Kashk Dar) is a village in Rudbar-e Shahrestan Rural District, Alamut-e Gharbi District, Qazvin County, Qazvin Province, Iran. At the 2006 census, its population was 117, in 31 families.
