= Gilan Keshah =

Village in Zanjan province, Iran

Gilan Keshah Persian: گيلانكشه
- Village
- Location within Iran
- Coordinates: 36°45′15″N 49°04′22″E
- Country: Iran
- Province: Zanjan
- County: Tarom
- District: Gilvan
- Rural District: Tashvir

Population (2016)
  - Total: 1,794
- Time zone: UTC+3:30 (IRST)

Gilan Keshah (Persian: گيلانكشه) (Note: Also romanized as Gīlān Keshah; also known as Chīlān Kasheh, Chīlānkashā, Chilankesha, and Jīlānkasheh) is a village in Tashvir Rural District of Gilvan District in Tarom County, Zanjan province, Iran.

== Demographics ==
=== Population ===
At the time of the 2006 National Census, the village's population was 1,459 in 349 households, when it was in Gilvan Rural District of the Central District. The following census in 2011 counted 1,566 people in 471 households. The 2016 census measured the population of the village as 1,794 people in 574 households.

In 2019, the rural district was separated from the district in the formation of Gilvan District, and Gilan Keshah was transferred to Tashvir Rural District created in the new district.
