= Hendi Kandi-ye Qadim =

Village in Zanjan province, Iran

Hendi Kandi-ye Qadim Persian: هندي کندي قديم
- Village
- Location within Iran
- Coordinates: 36°47′45″N 49°04′33″E
- Country: Iran
- Province: Zanjan
- County: Tarom
- District: Gilvan
- Rural District: Tashvir

Population (2016)
  - Total: 206
- Time zone: UTC+3:30 (IRST)

Hendi Kandi-ye Qadim (Persian: هندي کندي قديم) (Note: Formerly known as Hendi Kandi (هندي کندي), also romanized as Hendī Kandī; also known as Hand Kandī, Hend Kandī, Hindi Kandi, and Khindukandi) is a village in Tashvir Rural District of Gilvan District in Tarom County, Zanjan province, Iran.

== Demographics ==
=== Population ===
At the time of the 2006 National Census, the village's population was 1,048 in 257 households, when it was in Gilvan Rural District of the Central District. The following census in 2011 counted 256 people in 77 households. The 2016 census measured the population of the village as 206 people in 67 households.

In 2019, the rural district was separated from the district in the formation of Gilvan District, and Hendi Kandi-ye Qadim was transferred to Tashvir Rural District created in the new district.
