= Parchineh =

Village in Zanjan province, Iran

Parchineh Persian: پرچينه
- Village
- Location within Iran
- Coordinates: 36°42′44″N 48°55′03″E
- Country: Iran
- Province: Zanjan
- County: Tarom
- District: Gilvan
- Rural District: Tashvir

Population (2016)
  - Total: 45
- Time zone: UTC+3:30 (IRST)

Parchineh (Persian: پرچينه) (Note: Also romanized as Parchīneh; also known as Birdzhinakh, Birjīnah, Bīrjīneh, and Parjīneh) is a village in Tashvir Rural District of Gilvan District in Tarom County, Zanjan province, Iran.

== Demographics ==
=== Population ===
At the time of the 2006 National Census, the village's population was 68 in 19 households, when it was in Gilvan Rural District of the Central District. The following census in 2011 counted 52 people in 20 households. The 2016 census measured the population of the village as 45 people in 14 households.

In 2019, the rural district was separated from the district in the formation of Gilvan District, and Parchineh was transferred to Tashvir Rural District created in the new district.
