= Lahneh =

Village in Zanjan province, Iran

Lahneh Persian: لهنه
- Village
- Location within Iran
- Coordinates: 36°45′20″N 48°58′25″E
- Country: Iran
- Province: Zanjan
- County: Tarom
- District: Gilvan
- Rural District: Tashvir

Population (2016)
  - Total: 30
- Time zone: UTC+3:30 (IRST)

Lahneh (Persian: لهنه) is a village in Tashvir Rural District of Gilvan District in Tarom County, Zanjan province, Iran.

== Demographics ==
=== Population ===
At the time of the 2006 National Census, the village's population was 22 in eight households, when it was in Gilvan Rural District of the Central District. The following census in 2011 counted 10 people in four households. The 2016 census measured the population of the village as 30 people in 11 households

In 2019, the rural district was separated from the district in the formation of Gilvan District, and Lahneh was transferred to Tashvir Rural District created in the new district.
