= Chamleh, Zanjan =

Village in Zanjan province, Iran

Chamleh Persian: چمله
- Village
- Location within Iran
- Coordinates: 36°48′13″N 49°01′20″E
- Country: Iran
- Province: Zanjan
- County: Tarom
- District: Gilvan
- Rural District: Tashvir

Population (2016)
  - Total: 201
- Time zone: UTC+3:30 (IRST)

Chamleh (Persian: چمله) (Note: Also romanized as Chamaleh; also known as Chemle) is a village in Tashvir Rural District of Gilvan District in Tarom County, Zanjan province, Iran.

== Demographics ==
=== Population ===
At the time of the 2006 National Census, the village's population was 221 in 59 households, when it was in Gilvan Rural District of the Central District. The following census in 2011 counted 232 people in 62 households. The 2016 census measured the population of the village as 201 people in 63 households.

In 2019, the rural district was separated from the district in the formation of Gilvan District, and Chamleh was transferred to Tashvir Rural District created in the new district.
