= Shirab =

Village in Zanjan province, Iran

Shirab Persian: شيراب
- Village
- Location within Iran
- Coordinates: 36°50′07″N 48°56′36″E
- Country: Iran
- Province: Zanjan
- County: Tarom
- District: Gilvan
- Rural District: Tashvir

Population (2016)
  - Total: 30
- Time zone: UTC+3:30 (IRST)

Shirab (Persian: شيراب) (Note: Also romanized as Shīrāb; also known as Shūr Āb) is a village in Tashvir Rural District of Gilvan District in Tarom County, Zanjan province, Iran.

== Demographics ==
=== Population ===
At the time of the 2006 National Census, the village's population was 39 in 10 households, when it was in Dastjerdeh Rural District of Chavarzaq District. The following census in 2011 counted 35 people in 10 households. The 2016 census measured the population of the village as 30 people in nine households.

In 2019, Shirab was transferred to Tashvir Rural District created in the new Gilvan District.
