= Tashvir =

Village in Zanjan province, Iran

Tashvir Persian: تشوير
- Village
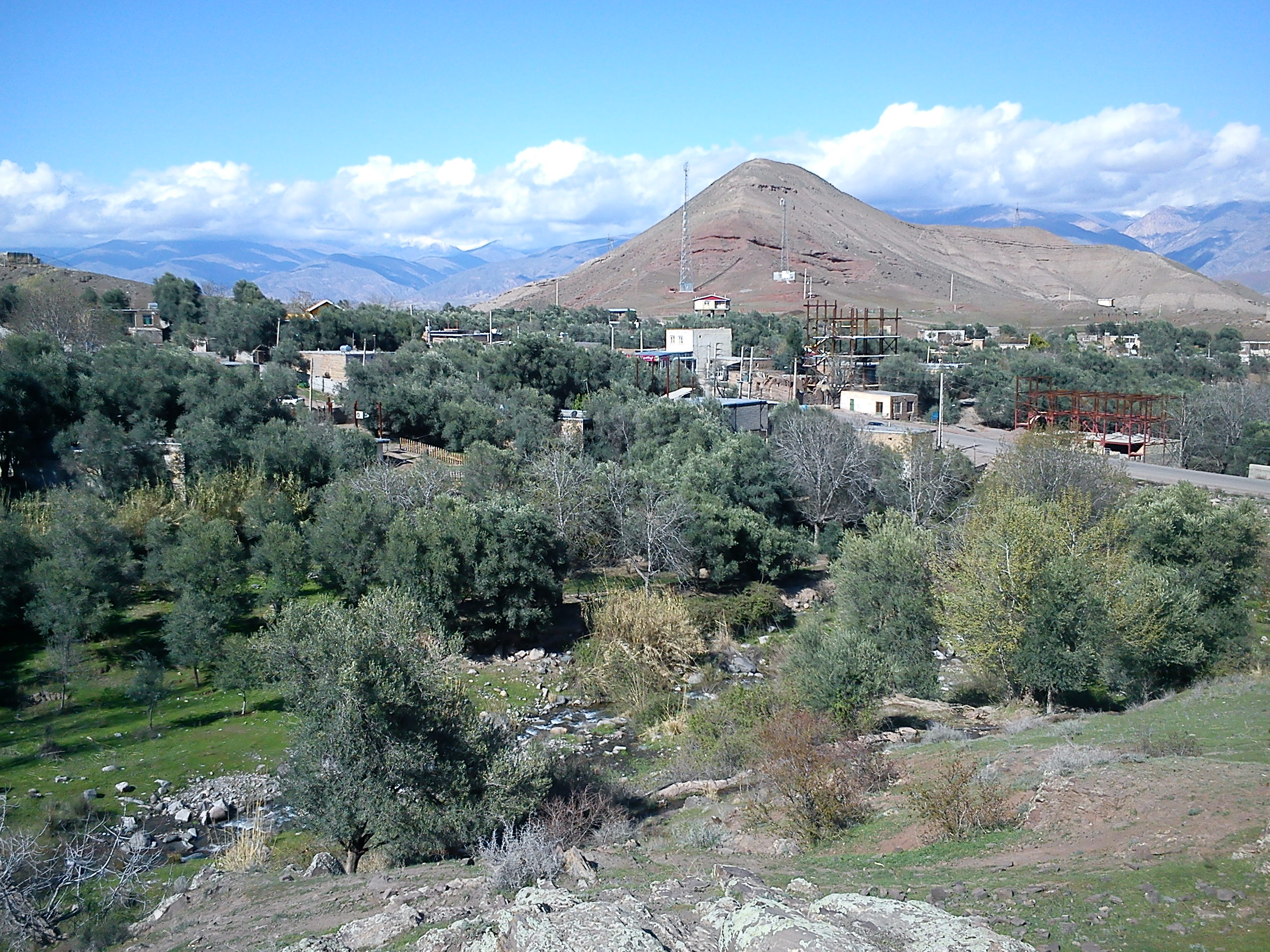
- View of the village of Tashvir

- Location within Iran
- Coordinates: 36°47′16″N 49°00′13″E
- Country: Iran
- Province: Zanjan
- County: Tarom
- District: Gilvan
- Rural District: Tashvir

Population (2016)
  - Total: 1,249
- Time zone: UTC+3:30 (IRST)

Tashvir (Persian: تشوير) (Note: Also romanized as Tashvīr) is a village in, and the capital of, Tashvir Rural District in Gilvan District, Tarom County, Zanjan province, Iran.

== Demographics ==
=== Population ===
At the time of the 2006 National Census, the village's population was 1,241 in 298 households, when it was in Gilvan Rural District of the Central District. The following census in 2011 counted 1,255 people in 321 households. The 2016 census measured the population of the village as 1,249 people in 378 households.

In 2019, the rural district was separated from the district in the formation of Gilvan District, and Tashvir was transferred to Tashvir Rural District created in the new district.
