= Zardeh, Zanjan =

Village in Zanjan province, Iran

Zardeh Persian: زرده
- Village
- Location within Iran
- Coordinates: 36°45′41″N 48°58′39″E
- Country: Iran
- Province: Zanjan
- County: Tarom
- District: Gilvan
- Rural District: Tashvir

Population (2016)
  - Total: 96
- Time zone: UTC+3:30 (IRST)

Zardeh (Persian: زرده) (Note: Also known as Luban-Zardakh) is a village in Tashvir Rural District of Gilvan District in Tarom County, Zanjan province, Iran.

== Demographics ==
=== Population ===
At the time of the 2006 National Census, the village's population was 142 in 35 households, when it was in Gilvan Rural District of the Central District. The following census in 2011 counted 112 people in 34 households. The 2016 census measured the population of the village as 96 people in 31 households.

In 2019, the rural district was separated from the district in the formation of Gilvan District, and Zardeh was transferred to Tashvir Rural District created in the new district.
