= Hendi Kandi-ye Jadid =

Village in Zanjan province, Iran

Hendi Kandi-ye Jadid Persian: هندي کندي جديد
- Village
- Location within Iran
- Coordinates: 36°46′47″N 49°03′41″E
- Country: Iran
- Province: Zanjan
- County: Tarom
- District: Gilvan
- Rural District: Tashvir

Population (2016)
  - Total: 772
- Time zone: UTC+3:30 (IRST)

Hendi Kandi-ye Jadid (Persian: هندي کندي جديد) is a village in Tashvir Rural District of Gilvan District in Tarom County, Zanjan province, Iran.

== Demographics ==
=== Population ===
At the time of the 2011 National Census, the village's population was 813 in 226 households, when it was in Gilvan Rural District of the Central District. The following census in 2016 counted 772 people in 237 households.

In 2019, the rural district was separated from the district in the formation of Gilvan District, and Hendi Kandi-ye Jadid was transferred to Tashvir Rural District created in the new district.
