= Baba Marghuz =

Village in Zanjan province, Iran

Baba Marghuz Persian: بابامرغوز
- Village
- Location within Iran
- Coordinates: 36°48′37″N 48°52′56″E
- Country: Iran
- Province: Zanjan
- County: Tarom
- District: Gilvan
- Rural District: Tashvir

Population (2016)
  - Total: 0
- Time zone: UTC+3:30 (IRST)

Baba Marghuz (Persian: بابامرغوز) (Note: Also romanized as Bābā Marghūz; also known as Baba-Marguz and Bābā Mūrqūz) is a village in Tashvir Rural District of Gilvan District in Tarom County, Zanjan province, Iran.

== Demographics ==
=== Population ===
At the time of the 2006 National Census, the village's population was 17 in six households, when it was in Dastjerdeh Rural District of Chavarzaq District. The village did not appear in the following census of 2011. The 2016 census measured the population of the village as zero.

In 2019, Baba Marghuz was transferred to Tashvir Rural District created in the new Gilvan District.
