= Sorkheh Dizaj, Tarom =

Village in Zanjan province, Iran

Sorkheh Dizaj Persian: سرخه ديزج
- Village
- Location within Iran
- Coordinates: 36°48′48″N 48°56′45″E
- Country: Iran
- Province: Zanjan
- County: Tarom
- District: Gilvan
- Rural District: Tashvir

Population (2016)
  - Total: 313
- Time zone: UTC+3:30 (IRST)

Sorkheh Dizaj (Persian: سرخه ديزج) (Note: Also romanized as Sorkheh Dīzaj; also known as Sorkh Dīzaj, Surkh Dazj, and Surkhdeza) is a village in Tashvir Rural District of Gilvan District in Tarom County, Zanjan province, Iran.

== Demographics ==
=== Population ===
At the time of the 2006 National Census, the village's population was 313 in 71 households, when it was in Dastjerdeh Rural District of Chavarzaq District. The following census in 2011 counted 314 people in 86 households. The 2016 census measured the population of the village as 313 people in 98 households.

In 2019, Sorkheh Dizaj was transferred to Tashvir Rural District created in the new Gilvan District.
