= Mamalan =

Village in Zanjan province, Iran

Mamalan Persian: مامالان
- Village
- Location within Iran
- Coordinates: 36°49′59″N 49°01′26″E
- Country: Iran
- Province: Zanjan
- County: Tarom
- District: Gilvan
- Rural District: Gilvan

Population (2016)
  - Total: 359
- Time zone: UTC+3:30 (IRST)

Mamalan (Persian: مامالان) (Note: Also romanized as Māmālān; also known as Māhmalānlū, Makhmalanlu, Narcham, Parcham, and Purcham) is a village in, and the capital of, Gilvan Rural District in Gilvan District of Tarom County, Zanjan province, Iran. The previous capital of the rural district was the village of Gilvan, now a city.

== Demographics ==
=== Population ===
At the time of the 2006 National Census, the village's population was 429 in 116 households, when it was in the Central District. The following census in 2011 counted 421 people in 122 households. The 2016 census measured the population of the village as 359 people in 126 households.

In 2019, the rural district was separated from the district in the formation of Gilvan District.
