= Jozvenaq =

Village in Zanjan province, Iran

Jozvenaq Persian: جزونق
- Village
- Location within Iran
- Coordinates: 36°47′31″N 48°53′46″E
- Country: Iran
- Province: Zanjan
- County: Tarom
- District: Gilvan
- Rural District: Tashvir

Population (2016)
  - Total: 26
- Time zone: UTC+3:30 (IRST)

Jozvenaq (Persian: جزونق) (Note: Also romanized as Jazoonaq, Jazvanaq, and Jazvanq; also known as Chaftan, Jaftān, and Jozvenū) is a village in Tashvir Rural District of Gilvan District in Tarom County, Zanjan province, Iran.

== Demographics ==
=== Population ===
At the time of the 2006 National Census, the village's population was 52 in 15 households, when it was in Dastjerdeh Rural District of Chavarzaq District. The following census in 2011 counted 41 people in 12 households. The 2016 census measured the population of the village as 26 people in nine households.

In 2019, Jozvenaq was transferred to Tashvir Rural District created in the new Gilvan District.
