= Mohammadabad-e Khvajeh Beyglu =

Village in Zanjan province, Iran

Mohammadabad-e Khvajeh Beyglu Persian: محمدابادخواجه بيگلو
- Village
- Location within Iran
- Coordinates: 36°46′57″N 49°06′56″E
- Country: Iran
- Province: Zanjan
- County: Tarom
- District: Gilvan
- Rural District: Tashvir

Population (2016)
  - Total: 105
- Time zone: UTC+3:30 (IRST)

Mohammadabad-e Khvajeh Beyglu (Persian: محمدابادخواجه بيگلو,) (Note: Also romanized as Moḩammadābād-e Khvājeh Beyglū; also known as Moḩammadābād) is a village in Tashvir Rural District of Gilvan District, Tarom County, Zanjan province, Iran.

== Demographics ==
=== Population ===
At the time of the 2006 National Census, the village's population was 122 in 29 households, when it was in Gilvan Rural District of the Central District. The following census in 2011 counted 114 people in 27 households. The 2016 census measured the population of the village as 105 people in 32 households.

In 2019, the rural district was separated from the district in the formation of Gilvan District, and Mohammadabad-e Khvajeh Beyglu was transferred to Tashvir Rural District created in the new district.
