= Taskin, Zanjan =

Village in Zanjan province, Iran

Taskin Persian: تسكين
- Village
- Location within Iran
- Coordinates: 36°49′05″N 49°00′38″E
- Country: Iran
- Province: Zanjan
- County: Tarom
- District: Gilvan
- Rural District: Tashvir

Population (2016)
  - Total: 757
- Time zone: UTC+3:30 (IRST)

Taskin (Persian: تسكين) (Note: Also romanized as Taskīn; also known as Taskīn-e Soflá) is a village in Tashvir Rural District of Gilvan District in Tarom County, Zanjan province, Iran.

== Demographics ==
=== Population ===
At the time of the 2006 National Census, the village's population was 816 in 195 households, when it was in Gilvan Rural District of the Central District. The following census in 2011 counted 863 people in 229 households. The 2016 census measured the population of the village as 757 people in 219 households.

In 2019, the rural district was separated from the district in the formation of Gilvan District, and Taskin was transferred to Tashvir Rural District created in the new district.
