= Charazeh =

Village in Zanjan province, Iran

Charazeh Persian: چرزه
- Village
- Location within Iran
- Coordinates: 36°52′18″N 49°07′47″E
- Country: Iran
- Province: Zanjan
- County: Tarom
- District: Gilvan
- Rural District: Gilvan

Population (2016)
  - Total: 10
- Time zone: UTC+3:30 (IRST)

Charazeh (Persian: چرزه) is a village in Gilvan Rural District of Gilvan District in Tarom County, Zanjan province, Iran.

== Demographics ==
=== Population ===
At the time of the 2006 National Census, the village's population was 36 in 12 households, when it was in the Central District. The following census in 2011 counted 29 people in eight households. The 2016 census measured the population of the village as 10 people in five households.

In 2019, the rural district was separated from the district in the formation of Gilvan District.
