= Zehtarabad =

Village in Zanjan province, Iran

Zehtarabad Persian: زهتراباد
- Village
- Location within Iran
- Coordinates: 36°50′52″N 49°02′19″E
- Country: Iran
- Province: Zanjan
- County: Tarom
- District: Gilvan
- Rural District: Gilvan

Population (2016)
  - Total: 418
- Time zone: UTC+3:30 (IRST)

Zehtarabad (Persian: زهتراباد) (Note: Also romanized as Zehtarābād; also known as Zaitarābād, Zaytarabad, and Zeytarābād) is a village in Gilvan Rural District of Gilvan District in Tarom County, Zanjan province, Iran.

== Demographics ==
=== Population ===
At the time of the 2006 National Census, the village's population was 533 in 138 households, when it was in the Central District. The following census in 2011 counted 554 people in 163 households. The 2016 census measured the population of the village as 418 people in 142 households.

In 2019, the rural district was separated from the district in the formation of Gilvan District.
