= Jeyshabad =

Village in Zanjan province, Iran

Jeyshabad Persian: جيش اباد
- Village
- Location within Iran
- Coordinates: 36°53′23″N 49°11′13″E
- Country: Iran
- Province: Zanjan
- County: Tarom
- District: Gilvan
- Rural District: Gilvan

Population (2016)
  - Total: 35
- Time zone: UTC+3:30 (IRST)

Jeyshabad (Persian: جيش اباد) is a village in Gilvan Rural District of Gilvan District in Tarom County, Zanjan province, Iran.

== Demographics ==
=== Population ===
The village did not appear in the 2006 and 2011 National Censuses, when it was in the Central District. The 2016 census measured the population of the village as 35 people in 16 households.

In 2019, the rural district was separated from the district in the formation of Gilvan District.
