= Garehlu =

Village in Zanjan province, Iran

Garehlu Persian: گره لو
- Village
- Country: Iran
- Province: Zanjan
- County: Tarom
- District: Gilvan
- Rural District: Gilvan

Population (2016)
  - Total: 0
- Time zone: UTC+3:30 (IRST)

Garehlu (Persian: گره لو) (Note: Also romanized as Garehlū) is a village in Gilvan Rural District of Gilvan District in Tarom County, Zanjan province, Iran.

== Demographics ==
=== Population ===
At the time of the 2006 National Census, the village's population was 12 in five households, when it was in the Central District. The village did not appear in the following census of 2011. The 2016 census measured the population of the village as zero.

In 2019, the rural district was separated from the district in the formation of Gilvan District.
