= Khorramabad Kahriz =

Village in Zanjan province, Iran

Khorramabad Kahriz Persian: خرم ابادكهريز
- Village
- Location within Iran
- Coordinates: 36°52′28″N 49°00′25″E
- Country: Iran
- Province: Zanjan
- County: Tarom
- District: Gilvan
- Rural District: Gilvan

Population (2016)
  - Total: 432
- Time zone: UTC+3:30 (IRST)

Khorramabad Kahriz (Persian: خرم ابادكهريز) (Note: Also romanized as Khorramābād Kahrīz; also known as Kahrīz-e Khorramābād) is a village in Gilvan Rural District of Gilvan District in Tarom County, Zanjan province, Iran.

== Demographics ==
=== Population ===
At the time of the 2006 National Census, the village's population was 557 in 130 households, when it was in the Central District. The following census in 2011 counted 548 people in 155 households. The 2016 census measured the population of the village as 432 people in 130 households.

In 2019, the rural district was separated from the district in the formation of Gilvan District.
