= Shaqaqi, Iran =

Shaqaqi (Persian: شقاقي) may refer to:

- Shaqaqi-ye Anzar
- Shaqaqi-ye Chavarzaq
- Shaqaqi-ye Jezla
