= Harunabad =

Harunabad may refer to:

== Iran ==
- Harunabad, East Azerbaijan, a village in Iran
- Harunabad, Hamadan, a village in Iran
- Harunabad, alternate name of Eslamabad-e Gharb, a city in Iran
- Harunabad-e Olya, Zanjan Province, Iran
- Harunabad-e Sofla, Zanjan Province, Iran

== Pakistan ==
- Haroonabad, Punjab, a city in Pakistan
