= Hesarabad =

Village in Zanjan province, Iran

Hesarabad Persian: حصار آباد
- Village
- Country: Iran
- Province: Zanjan
- County: Tarom
- District: Gilvan
- Rural District: Gilvan

Population (2016)
  - Total: 77
- Time zone: UTC+3:30 (IRST)

Hesarabad (Persian: حصار آباد) (Note: Also romanized as Ḩeşārābād) is a village in Gilvan Rural District of Gilvan District in Tarom County, Zanjan province, Iran.

== Demographics ==
=== Population ===
At the time of the 2006 National Census, the village's population was 64 in 15 households, when it was in the Central District. The following census in 2011 counted 84 people in 21 households. The 2016 census measured the population of the village as 77 people in 27 households.

In 2019, the rural district was separated from the district in the formation of Gilvan District.
