= Sowmaeh Bar =

Village in Zanjan province, Iran

Sowmaeh Bar Persian: صومعه بر
- Village
- Location within Iran
- Coordinates: 36°49′35″N 49°05′59″E
- Country: Iran
- Province: Zanjan
- County: Tarom
- District: Gilvan
- Rural District: Gilvan

Population (2016)
  - Total: 114
- Time zone: UTC+3:30 (IRST)

Sowmaeh Bar (Persian: صومعه بر) (Note: Also romanized as Şowma‘eh Bar, Şowme‘eh Bar, Sowme‘eh Bar, Sumeeh Bar, and Şūme‘eh Bar; also known as Samabar, Samāvar, and Semāvar) is a village in Gilvan Rural District of Gilvan District in Tarom County, Zanjan province, Iran.

== Demographics ==
=== Population ===
At the time of the 2006 National Census, the village's population was 155 in 40 households, when it was in the Central District. The following census in 2011 counted 113 people in 35 households. The 2016 census measured the population of the village as 114 people in 41 households.

In 2019, the rural district was separated from the district in the formation of Gilvan District.
