= Anarestan, Zanjan =

Village in Zanjan province, Iran

Anarestan Persian: انارستان
- Village
- Location within Iran
- Coordinates: 36°50′21″N 49°06′13″E
- Country: Iran
- Province: Zanjan
- County: Tarom
- District: Gilvan
- Rural District: Gilvan

Population (2016)
  - Total: 131
- Time zone: UTC+3:30 (IRST)

Anarestan (Persian: انارستان) (Note: Also romanized as Anārestān; also known as Napastan, Narastān, and Narestān) is a village in Gilvan Rural District of Gilvan District in Tarom County, Zanjan province, Iran.

== Demographics ==
=== Population ===
At the time of the 2006 National Census, the village's population was 171 in 40 households, when it was in the Central District. The following census in 2011 counted 154 people in 44 households. The 2016 census measured the population of the village as 131 people in 40 households.

In 2019, the rural district was separated from the district in the formation of Gilvan District.
