= Alzin =

Village in Zanjan province, Iran

Alzin Persian: الزين
- Village
- Location within Iran
- Coordinates: 36°49′08″N 48°59′05″E
- Country: Iran
- Province: Zanjan
- County: Tarom
- District: Gilvan
- Rural District: Tashvir

Population (2016)
  - Total: 398
- Time zone: UTC+3:30 (IRST)

Alzin (Persian: الزين) (Note: Also romanized as Alz̄īn and Alzīn; also known as Alīzīn) is a village in Tashvir Rural District of Gilvan District in Tarom County, Zanjan province, Iran.

== Demographics ==
=== Population ===
At the time of the 2006 National Census, the village's population was 435 in 113 households, when it was in Dastjerdeh Rural District of Chavarzaq District. The following census in 2011 counted 452 people in 129 households. The 2016 census measured the population of the village as 398 people in 124 households.

In 2019, Alzin was transferred to Tashvir Rural District created in the new Gilvan District.
