= Pesar =

Village in Zanjan province, Iran

Pesar Persian: پسار
- Village
- Location within Iran
- Coordinates: 36°52′37″N 49°04′31″E
- Country: Iran
- Province: Zanjan
- County: Tarom
- District: Gilvan
- Rural District: Gilvan

Population (2016)
  - Total: 151
- Time zone: UTC+3:30 (IRST)

Pesar (Persian: پسار) (Note: Also romanized as Pāsār and Pesār; also known as Pāysar) is a village in Gilvan Rural District of Gilvan District in Tarom County, Zanjan province, Iran.

== Demographics ==
=== Population ===
At the time of the 2006 National Census, the village's population was 206 in 55 households, when it was in the Central District. The following census in 2011 counted 194 people in 52 households. The 2016 census measured the population of the village as 151 people in 54 households.

In 2019, the rural district was separated from the district in the formation of Gilvan District.
