= Deh Bahar =

Village in Zanjan province, Iran

Deh Bahar Persian: ده بهار
- Village
- Location within Iran
- Coordinates: 36°53′46″N 49°01′47″E
- Country: Iran
- Province: Zanjan
- County: Tarom
- District: Gilvan
- Rural District: Gilvan

Population (2016)
  - Total: 625
- Time zone: UTC+3:30 (IRST)

Deh Bahar (Persian: ده بهار) (Note: Also romanized as Deh Bahār; also known as Dehbahā) is a village in Gilvan Rural District of Gilvan District in Tarom County, Zanjan province, Iran.

== Demographics ==
=== Population ===
At the time of the 2006 National Census, the village's population was 757 in 183 households, when it was in the Central District. The following census in 2011 counted 729 people in 214 households. The 2016 census measured the population of the village as 625 people in 211 households.

In 2019, the rural district was separated from the district in the formation of Gilvan District.
