= Qarqoli Cham =

Village in Zanjan province, Iran

Qarqoli Cham Persian: قارقلي چم
- Village
- Location within Iran
- Coordinates: 36°47′59″N 49°03′35″E
- Country: Iran
- Province: Zanjan
- County: Tarom
- District: Gilvan
- Rural District: Gilvan

Population (2016)
  - Total: 609
- Time zone: UTC+3:30 (IRST)

Qarqoli Cham (Persian: قارقلي چم) (Note: Also romanized as Qārqolī Cham; also known as Kargulicham, Qarehqūlīcham, Qārghūlīcham, and Qārqūlī Cham) is a village in Gilvan Rural District of Gilvan District in Tarom County, Zanjan province, Iran.

== Demographics ==
=== Population ===
At the time of the 2006 National Census, the village's population was 662 in 159 households, when it was in the Central District. The following census in 2011 counted 685 people in 209 households. The 2016 census measured the population of the village as 609 people in 192 households.

In 2019, the rural district was separated from the district in the formation of Gilvan District.
