= Chenar, Zanjan =

Village in Zanjan province, Iran

Chenar Persian: چنار
- Village
- Location within Iran
- Coordinates: 37°08′00″N 48°49′17″E
- Country: Iran
- Province: Zanjan
- County: Tarom
- District: Central
- Rural District: Darram

Population (2016)
  - Total: 0
- Time zone: UTC+3:30 (IRST)

Chenar (Persian: چنار) (Note: Also romanized as Chenār; also known as Chenārleq) is a village in Darram Rural District of the Central District in Tarom County, Zanjan province, Iran.

== Demographics ==
=== Population ===
At the time of the 2006 National Census, the village's population was 35 in 11 households. The following census in 2011 counted 25 people in eight households. The 2016 census measured the population of the village as zero.
