= Jia, Iran =

Village in Zanjan province, Iran

Jia Persian: جيا
- Village
- Location within Iran
- Coordinates: 36°55′41″N 48°48′04″E
- Country: Iran
- Province: Zanjan
- County: Tarom
- District: Chavarzaq
- Rural District: Chavarzaq

Population (2016)
  - Total: 577
- Time zone: UTC+3:30 (IRST)

Jia (Persian: جيا) (Note: Also romanized as Jeyā and Jīā; also known as Giya) is a village in Chavarzaq Rural District of Chavarzaq District in Tarom County, Zanjan province, Iran.

== Demographics ==
At the time of the 2006 National Census, the village's population was 583 in 157 households. The following census in 2011 counted 627 people in 168 households. The 2016 census measured the population of the village as 577 people in 182 households.
