= Razeh Band =

Village in Zanjan province, Iran

Razeh Band Persian: رزه بند
- Village
- Location within Iran
- Coordinates: 36°50′39″N 48°54′03″E
- Country: Iran
- Province: Zanjan
- County: Tarom
- District: Chavarzaq
- Rural District: Dastjerdeh

Population (2016)
  - Total: 625
- Time zone: UTC+3:30 (IRST)

Razeh Band (Persian: رزه بند) (Note: Also romanized as Rezehband; also known as Razaband and Razeband) is a village in Dastjerdeh Rural District of Chavarzaq District in Tarom County, Zanjan province, Iran.

== Demographics ==
=== Population ===
At the time of the 2006 National Census, the village's population was 583 in 145 households. The following census in 2011 counted 613 people in 170 households. The 2016 census measured the population of the village as 625 people in 191 households.
