= Mirzalu =

Village in Zanjan province, Iran

Mirzalu Persian: ميرزالو
- Village
- Location within Iran
- Coordinates: 37°02′12″N 48°46′24″E
- Country: Iran
- Province: Zanjan
- County: Tarom
- District: Central
- Rural District: Darram

Population (2016)
  - Total: 167
- Time zone: UTC+3:30 (IRST)

Mirzalu (Persian: ميرزالو) (Note: Also romanized as Mīrzālū; also known as Mirza-Khani and Mīrzā Khānlū) is a village in Darram Rural District of the Central District in Tarom County, Zanjan province, Iran.

== Demographics ==
=== Population ===
At the time of the 2006 National Census, the village's population was 178 in 36 households. The following census in 2011 counted 197 people in 54 households. The 2016 census measured the population of the village as 167 people in 55 households.
