= Tazeh Kand, Tarom =

Village in Zanjan province, Iran

Tazeh Kand Persian: تازه كند
- Village
- Location within Iran
- Coordinates: 36°54′35″N 48°39′36″E
- Country: Iran
- Province: Zanjan
- County: Tarom
- District: Chavarzaq
- Rural District: Chavarzaq

Population (2016)
  - Total: 112
- Time zone: UTC+3:30 (IRST)

Tazeh Kand (Persian: تازه كند) (Note: Also romanized as Tāzeh Kand; also known as Ak-Zava, Āq Zawa, Āqzevaj, and Āqzūj) is a village in Chavarzaq Rural District of Chavarzaq District in Tarom County, Zanjan province, Iran.

== Demographics ==
At the time of the 2006 National Census, the village's population was 205 in 51 households. The following census in 2011 counted 158 people in 48 households. The 2016 census measured the population of the village as 112 people in 34 households.
