= Anzar-e Jadid =

Village in Zanjan province, Iran

Anzar-e Jadid Persian: انذر جديد
- Village
- Location within Iran
- Coordinates: 37°00′50″N 48°44′07″E
- Country: Iran
- Province: Zanjan
- County: Tarom
- District: Chavarzaq
- Rural District: Chavarzaq

Population (2016)
  - Total: 634
- Time zone: UTC+3:30 (IRST)

Anzar-e Jadid (Persian: انذر جديد) is a village in Chavarzaq Rural District of Chavarzaq District in Tarom County, Zanjan province, Iran.

== Demographics ==
At the time of the 2011 National Census, the village's population was 603 in 185 households. The following census in 2016 counted 634 people in 202 households.
