= Kasran =

Village in Zanjan province, Iran

Kasran Persian: كسران
- Village
- Location within Iran
- Coordinates: 37°02′41″N 48°37′37″E
- Country: Iran
- Province: Zanjan
- County: Tarom
- District: Chavarzaq
- Rural District: Chavarzaq

Population (2016)
  - Total: 229
- Time zone: UTC+3:30 (IRST)

Kasran (Persian: كسران) (Note: Also romanized as Kasrān) is a village in Chavarzaq Rural District of Chavarzaq District in Tarom County, Zanjan province, Iran.

== Demographics ==
At the time of the 2006 National Census, the village's population was 224 in 52 households. The following census in 2011 counted 217 people in 54 households. The 2016 census measured the population of the village as 229 people in 64 households.
