= Tah Darreh =

Village in Zanjan province, Iran

Tah Darreh Persian: ته دره
- Village
- Location within Iran
- Coordinates: 37°01′36″N 48°51′13″E
- Country: Iran
- Province: Zanjan
- County: Tarom
- District: Central
- Rural District: Darram

Population (2016)
  - Total: 163
- Time zone: UTC+3:30 (IRST)

Tah Darreh (Persian: ته دره) (Note: Also known as Darband and Seh Darreh) is a village in Darram Rural District of the Central District in Tarom County, Zanjan province, Iran.

== Demographics ==
=== Population ===
At the time of the 2006 National Census, the village's population was 197 in 48 households. The following census in 2011 counted 177 people in 53 households. The 2016 census measured the population of the village as 163 people in 51 households.
