= Ich, Zanjan =

Village in Zanjan province, Iran

Ich Persian: ايچ
- Village
- Location within Iran
- Coordinates: 36°55′48″N 48°46′41″E
- Country: Iran
- Province: Zanjan
- County: Tarom
- District: Chavarzaq
- Rural District: Chavarzaq

Population (2016)
  - Total: 627
- Time zone: UTC+3:30 (IRST)

Ich (Persian: ايچ) (Note: Also romanized as Īch; also known as Aiye, Ayeh, Eiy, and Īj) is a village in Chavarzaq Rural District of Chavarzaq District in Tarom County, Zanjan province, Iran.

== Demographics ==
At the time of the 2006 National Census, the village's population was 609 in 145 households. The following census in 2011 counted 646 people in 162 households. The 2016 census measured the population of the village as 627 people in 170 households.
