= Gholam Cham =

Village in Zanjan province, Iran

Gholam Cham Persian: غلام چم
- Village
- Location within Iran
- Country: Iran
- Province: Zanjan
- County: Tarom
- District: Central
- Rural District: Darram

Population (2016)
  - Total: 79
- Time zone: UTC+3:30 (IRST)

Gholam Cham (Persian: غلام چم) (Note: Also romanized as Gholām Cham) is a village in Darram Rural District of the Central District in Tarom County, Zanjan province, Iran.

== Demographics ==
=== Population ===
At the time of the 2006 National Census, the village's population was 84 in 22 households. The following census in 2011 counted 99 people in 31 households. The 2016 census measured the population of the village as 79 people in 30 households.
