= Dohneh, Zanjan =

Village in Zanjan province, Iran

Dohneh Persian: دهنه
- Village
- Location within Iran
- Coordinates: 36°52′42″N 48°52′37″E
- Country: Iran
- Province: Zanjan
- County: Tarom
- District: Chavarzaq
- Rural District: Dastjerdeh

Population (2016)
  - Total: 761
- Time zone: UTC+3:30 (IRST)

Dohneh (Persian: دهنه) (Note: Also romanized as Dahaneh; also known as Dūḩīeh, Dūhina, and Dukhna) is a village in Dastjerdeh Rural District of Chavarzaq District in Tarom County, Zanjan province, Iran.

== Demographics ==
=== Population ===
At the time of the 2006 National Census, the village's population was 685 in 163 households. The following census in 2011 counted 726 people in 189 households. The 2016 census measured the population of the village as 761 people in 228 households.
