= Parcham-e Qadim =

Village in Zanjan province, Iran

Parcham Persian: پرچم قديم
- Village
- Location within Iran
- Coordinates: 36°50′37″N 49°00′41″E
- Country: Iran
- Province: Zanjan
- County: Tarom
- District: Gilvan
- Rural District: Gilvan

Population (2016)
  - Total: 106
- Time zone: UTC+3:30 (IRST)

Parcham-e Qadim (Persian: پرچم قديم) (Note: Also romanized as Parcham-e Qadīm; also known as Narcham, Parcham, Pīr Cham, and Purcham) is a village in Gilvan Rural District of Gilvan District in Tarom County, Zanjan province, Iran.

== Demographics ==
=== Population ===
At the time of the 2006 National Census, the village's population was 152 in 31 households, when it was in the Central District. The following census in 2011 counted 126 people in 33 households. The 2016 census measured the population of the village as 106 people in 30 households.

In 2019, the rural district was separated from the district in the formation of Gilvan District.
