= Hezarrud =

Hezarrud (Persian: هزاررود) may refer to:

- Hezarrud-e Olya
- Hezarrud-e Sofla
