= Sansiz =

Village in Zanjan province, Iran

Sansiz Persian: سانسيز
- Village
- Location within Iran
- Coordinates: 36°54′49″N 48°51′43″E
- Country: Iran
- Province: Zanjan
- County: Tarom
- District: Chavarzaq
- Rural District: Dastjerdeh

Population (2016)
  - Total: 1,074
- Time zone: UTC+3:30 (IRST)

Sansiz (Persian: سانسيز) (Note: Also romanized as Sānsīz; also known as Kishlak, Qeshlāq-e Bālā, Qishlāq, Sānsan, Sānsez, Sānsūr, and Sānsūz) is a village in Dastjerdeh Rural District of Chavarzaq District in Tarom County, Zanjan province, Iran.

== Demographics ==
=== Population ===
At the time of the 2006 National Census, the village's population was 893 in 214 households. The following census in 2011 counted 987 people in 296 households. The 2016 census measured the population of the village as 1,074 people in 327 households.
