= Jowzargan =

Village in Zanjan province, Iran

Jowzargan Persian: جوجرگان
- Village
- Location within Iran
- Coordinates: 36°57′37″N 48°41′31″E
- Country: Iran
- Province: Zanjan
- County: Tarom
- District: Chavarzaq
- Rural District: Chavarzaq

Population (2016)
  - Total: 64
- Time zone: UTC+3:30 (IRST)

Jowzargan (Persian: جوزرگان) (Note: Also romanized as Jowzargān; also known as Dzhadzhargan, Faizābād, Jajargān, Joojarakan, Jowjerkān, and Jūjergān) is a village in Chavarzaq Rural District of Chavarzaq District in Tarom County, Zanjan province, Iran.

== Demographics ==
At the time of the 2006 National Census, the village's population was 96 in 23 households. The following census in 2011 counted 75 people in 21 households. The 2016 census measured the population of the village as 64 people in 22 households.
