= Qanqoli =

Qanqoli (Persian: قانقلي), also rendered as Kanguli or Kanghuli, may refer to:

- Qanqoli-ye Olya
- Qanqoli-ye Sofla
