= Gilvan =

Gilvan or Gilavan (Persian: گيلوان) may refer to:

- Gilavan, Ardabil
- Gilvan, Zanjan
- Gilvan Rural District, in Zanjan Province
