= Kordabad, Zanjan =

Village in Zanjan province, Iran

Kordabad Persian: کرد اباد
- Village
- Location within Iran
- Country: Iran
- Province: Zanjan
- County: Tarom
- District: Central
- Rural District: Ab Bar

Population (2016)
  - Total: 38
- Time zone: UTC+3:30 (IRST)

Kordabad (Persian: کرد اباد) (Note: Also romanized as Kordābād) is a village in Ab Bar Rural District of the Central District in Tarom County, Zanjan province, Iran.

== Demographics ==
=== Population ===
At the time of the 2006 National Census, the village's population was 39 in nine households. The following census in 2011 counted 43 people in 13 households. The 2016 census measured the population of the village as 38 people in 12 households.
