= Zaj Kan =

Zaj Kan or Zachgan or Zajkan or Zachkan or Zadzhkan (Persian: زاجكان) may refer to:

- Zaj Kan-e Sofla, Qazvin Province
- Zachkan, Zanjan Province
