= Bandargah, Zanjan =

Village in Zanjan province, Iran

Bandargah Persian: بندرگاه
- Village
- Location within Iran
- Coordinates: 37°06′04″N 48°52′15″E
- Country: Iran
- Province: Zanjan
- County: Tarom
- District: Central
- Rural District: Darram

Population (2016)
  - Total: 24
- Time zone: UTC+3:30 (IRST)

Bandargah (Persian: بندرگاه) (Note: Also romanized as Bandargāh; also known as Bandargakh) is a village in Darram Rural District of the Central District in Tarom County, Zanjan province, Iran.

== Demographics ==
=== Population ===
At the time of the 2006 National Census, the village's population was 39 in 12 households. The following census in 2011 counted 27 people in nine households. The 2016 census measured the population of the village as 24 people in seven households.
