= Vanab =

Vanab (Persian: وناب) may refer to:

- Vanab, Lorestan
- Vanab, Zanjan
