= Siyahvarud =

Village in Zanjan province, Iran

Siyahvarud Persian: سياهورود
- Village
- Location within Iran
- Coordinates: 37°07′05″N 48°52′23″E
- Country: Iran
- Province: Zanjan
- County: Tarom
- District: Central
- Rural District: Darram

Population (2016)
  - Total: 213
- Time zone: UTC+3:30 (IRST)

Siyahvarud (Persian: سياهورود) (Note: Also romanized as Seyāh Varūd, Sīāh Varūd, Sīāh Vorūd, and Sīyāh Varūd; also known as Seyāh Rūd, Siah Rud, Sīāhrūd, Siyahrud (سياه رود), Sīāvarū (سيا ورو), Sīāveh Rūd, and Siyakh-Rud) is a village in Darram Rural District of the Central District in Tarom County, Zanjan province, Iran.

== Demographics ==
=== Population ===
At the time of the 2006 National Census, the village's population was 130 in 36 households. The following census in 2011 counted 138 people in 53 households. The 2016 census measured the population of the village as 213 people in 80 households.
