= Azizabad, Zanjan =

Village in Zanjan province, Iran

Azizabad Persian: عزيزاباد
- Village
- Location within Iran
- Coordinates: 36°55′15″N 48°54′13″E
- Country: Iran
- Province: Zanjan
- County: Tarom
- District: Central
- Rural District: Ab Bar

Population (2016)
  - Total: 93
- Time zone: UTC+3:30 (IRST)

Azizabad (Persian: عزيزاباد) (Note: Also romanized as ʿAzīzābād) is a village in Ab Bar Rural District of the Central District in Tarom County, Zanjan province, Iran.

== Demographics ==
=== Population ===
At the time of the 2006 National Census, the village's population was 105 in 22 households. The following census in 2011 counted 75 people in 20 households. The 2016 census measured the population of the village as 93 people in 27 households.
