= Anzar-e Qadim =

Village in Zanjan province, Iran

Anzar-e Qadim Persian: انذر قديم
- Village
- Location within Iran
- Coordinates: 37°00′19″N 48°44′48″E
- Country: Iran
- Province: Zanjan
- County: Tarom
- District: Chavarzaq
- Rural District: Chavarzaq

Population (2016)
  - Total: 279
- Time zone: UTC+3:30 (IRST)

Anzar-e Qadim (Persian: انذر قديم (Note: Formerly known as Anzar (انذر), also romanized as Anz̄ar and Anzer) is a village in Chavarzaq Rural District of Chavarzaq District in Tarom County, Zanjan province, Iran.

== Demographics ==
At the time of the 2006 National Census, the village's population was 785 in 199 households. The following census in 2011 counted 269 people in 88 households. The 2016 census measured the population of the village as 279 people in 88 households.
