= Qazi Bolaghi =

Village in Zanjan province, Iran

Qazi Bolaghi Persian: قاضي بلاغي
- Village
- Location within Iran
- Coordinates: 36°50′39″N 48°55′13″E
- Country: Iran
- Province: Zanjan
- County: Tarom
- District: Chavarzaq
- Rural District: Dastjerdeh

Population (2016)
  - Total: 477
- Time zone: UTC+3:30 (IRST)

Qazi Bolaghi (Persian: قاضي بلاغي) (Note: Also romanized as Qāzī Bolāghī; also known as Kazibaga, Qāẕī Bāghī, Qāzī Bāghī, Qāẕī Bolāgh, and Qāzībagha) is a village in Dastjerdeh Rural District of Chavarzaq District in Tarom County, Zanjan province, Iran.

== Demographics ==
=== Population ===
At the time of the 2006 National Census, the village's population was 412 in 110 households. The following census in 2011 counted 429 people in 125 households. The 2016 census measured the population of the village as 477 people in 149 households.
