= Vazneh Sar, Zanjan =

Village in Zanjan province, Iran

Vazneh Sar Persian: وزنه سر
- Village
- Location within Iran
- Coordinates: 37°01′03″N 48°52′48″E
- Country: Iran
- Province: Zanjan
- County: Tarom
- District: Central
- Rural District: Darram

Population (2016)
  - Total: 52
- Time zone: UTC+3:30 (IRST)

Vazneh Sar (Persian: وزنه سر) is a village in Darram Rural District of the Central District in Tarom County, Zanjan province, Iran.

== Demographics ==
=== Population ===
At the time of the 2006 National Census, the village's population was 58 in 19 households. The following census in 2011 counted 55 people in 20 households. The 2016 census measured the population of the village as 52 people in 20 households.
