= Taskin, Iran =

Taskin (Persian: تسكين) in Iran may refer to:

- Taskin, Qazvin
- Taskin, Zanjan
