= Banaru =

Banaru or Benarow (Persian: بنارو) may refer to:

- Banaru, Sistan and Baluchestan
- Banaru, Zanjan
