= Valis, Iran =

Village in Zanjan province, Iran

Valis Persian: وليس
- Village
- Location within Iran
- Coordinates: 37°01′27″N 48°37′00″E
- Country: Iran
- Province: Zanjan
- County: Tarom
- District: Chavarzaq
- Rural District: Chavarzaq

Population (2016)
  - Total: 459
- Time zone: UTC+3:30 (IRST)

Valis (Persian: وليس) (Note: Also romanized as Valīs) is a village in Chavarzaq Rural District of Chavarzaq District in Tarom County, Zanjan province, Iran.

== Demographics ==
At the time of the 2006 National Census, the village's population was 497 in 102 households. The following census in 2011 counted 454 people in 118 households. The 2016 census measured the population of the village as 459 people in 124 households.
