= Parcham (disambiguation) =

Parcham was one of the factions of the People's Democratic Party of Afghanistan.

Parcham may also refer to:

- Parcham (magazine), Persian language political magazine published in Iran between 1942 and 1944
- Parcham-e Qadim, village in Gilvan rural district, Iran
- Parcham Party of India, political party in India
