= Tashvir Rural District =

Rural district in Zanjan province, Iran

Tashvir Rural District Persian: دهستان تشوير
- Rural District
- Location within Iran
- Coordinates: 36°49′N 48°57′E
- Country: Iran
- Province: Zanjan
- County: Tarom
- District: Gilvan
- Established: 2019
- Capital: Tashvir
- Time zone: UTC+3:30 (IRST)

Tashvir Rural District (Persian: دهستان تشوير) is in Gilvan District of Tarom County, Zanjan province, Iran. Its capital is the village of Tashvir, whose population at the time of the 2016 National Census was 1,249 people in 378 households.

== Other villages in the rural district ==
- Alzin
- Baba Marghuz
- Chamleh
- Gilan Keshah
- Hendi Kandi-ye Jadid
- Hendi Kandi-ye Qadim
- Jozvenaq
- Lahneh
- Mohammadabad-e Khvajeh Beyglu
- Parchineh
- Shirab
- Sorkheh Dizaj
- Taskin
- Zardeh

== History ==
In 2019, Gilvan Rural District was separated from the Central District in the formation of Gilvan District, and Tashvir Rural District was created in the new district.
