= Sorkheh Misheh =

Village in Zanjan province, Iran

Sorkheh Misheh Persian: سرخه ميشه
- Village
- Location within Iran
- Coordinates: 37°00′40″N 48°39′06″E
- Country: Iran
- Province: Zanjan
- County: Tarom
- District: Chavarzaq
- Rural District: Chavarzaq

Population (2016)
  - Total: 302
- Time zone: UTC+3:30 (IRST)

Sorkheh Misheh (Persian: سرخه ميشه) (Note: Also romanized as Sorkheh Mīsheh; also known as Sorkh Mīsheh, Sorkheh Mesheh, and Surkha-Masha) is a village in Chavarzaq Rural District of Chavarzaq District in Tarom County, Zanjan province, Iran.

== Demographics ==
At the time of the 2006 National Census, the village's population was 343 in 75 households. The following census in 2011 counted 321 people in 71 households. The 2016 census measured the population of the village as 302 people in 93 households.
