= Koluch =

Village in Zanjan province, Iran

Koluch Persian: کلوچ
- Village
- Location within Iran
- Coordinates: 37°04′41″N 48°38′05″E
- Country: Iran
- Province: Zanjan
- County: Tarom
- District: Central
- Rural District: Darram

Population (2016)
  - Total: 386
- Time zone: UTC+3:30 (IRST)

Koluch (Persian: کلوچ) (Note: Also romanized as Kolūch; also known as Kolūj) is a village in Darram Rural District of the Central District in Tarom County, Zanjan province, Iran.

== Demographics ==
=== Population ===
At the time of the 2006 National Census, the village's population was 435 in 103 households. The following census in 2011 counted 409 people in 117 households. The 2016 census measured the population of the village as 386 people in 120 households.
