= Nukian =

Village in Zanjan province, Iran

Nukian Persian: نوكيان
- Village
- Location within Iran
- Coordinates: 37°07′19″N 48°51′48″E
- Country: Iran
- Province: Zanjan
- County: Tarom
- District: Central
- Rural District: Darram

Population (2016)
  - Total: 59
- Time zone: UTC+3:30 (IRST)

Nukian (Persian: نوكيان) (Note: Also romanized as Now Kīān, Nowkeyān, and Nūkīān; also known as Nekan and Neyūkān) is a village in Darram Rural District of the Central District in Tarom County, Zanjan province, Iran.

== Demographics ==
=== Population ===
At the time of the 2006 National Census, the village's population was 81 in 27 households. The following census in 2011 counted 56 people in 23 households. The 2016 census measured the population of the village as 59 people in 25 households.
