= Quhijan =

Village in Zanjan province, Iran

Quhijan Persian: قوهيجان
- Village
- Location within Iran
- Coordinates: 37°06′44″N 48°50′53″E
- Country: Iran
- Province: Zanjan
- County: Tarom
- District: Central
- Rural District: Darram

Population (2016)
  - Total: Below reporting threshold
- Time zone: UTC+3:30 (IRST)

Quhijan (Persian: قوهيجان) (Note: Also romanized as Qūhījān; also known as Gudzhan, Gūjān, and Qūh Jān) is a village in Darram Rural District of the Central District in Tarom County, Zanjan province, Iran.

== Demographics ==
=== Population ===
At the time of the 2006 National Census, the village's population was 18 in six households. The population in the following censuses of 2011 and 2016 was below the reporting threshold.
