= Validar =

Village in Zanjan province, Iran

Validar Persian: وليدر
- Village
- Location within Iran
- Coordinates: 36°58′11″N 48°37′53″E
- Country: Iran
- Province: Zanjan
- County: Tarom
- District: Chavarzaq
- Rural District: Chavarzaq

Population (2016)
  - Total: 794
- Time zone: UTC+3:30 (IRST)

Validar (Persian: وليدر) (Note: Also romanized as Valīdar; also known as Valehgareh, Val’gar, and Walgāra) is a village in Chavarzaq Rural District of Chavarzaq District in Tarom County, Zanjan province, Iran.

== Demographics ==
At the time of the 2006 National Census, the village's population was 692 in 143 households. The following census in 2011 counted 729 people in 200 households. The 2016 census measured the population of the village as 794 people in 228 households.
