= Arasht, Zanjan =

Village in Zanjan province, Iran

Arasht Persian: ارشت
- Village
- Location within Iran
- Coordinates: 36°56′58″N 48°49′53″E
- Country: Iran
- Province: Zanjan
- County: Tarom
- District: Chavarzaq
- Rural District: Chavarzaq

Population (2016)
  - Total: 526
- Time zone: UTC+3:30 (IRST)

Arasht (Persian: ارشت) (Note: Also romanized as Aresht; also known as Harish and Kharish) is a village in Chavarzaq Rural District of Chavarzaq District in Tarom County, Zanjan province, Iran.

== Demographics ==
At the time of the 2006 National Census, the village's population was 488 in 183 households. The following census in 2011 counted 571 people in 181 households. The 2016 census measured the population of the village as 526 people in 170 households.
