= Gavkhos =

Village in Zanjan province, Iran

Gavkhos Persian: گاوخس
- Village
- Location within Iran
- Coordinates: 37°07′06″N 48°44′32″E
- Country: Iran
- Province: Zanjan
- County: Tarom
- District: Central
- Rural District: Darram

Population (2016)
  - Total: 108
- Time zone: UTC+3:30 (IRST)

Gavkhos (Persian: گاوخس) (Note: Also romanized as Gāvkhos; also known as Gavaz, Gāvkhosb, Gāwaz, and Jāvaz) is a village in Darram Rural District of the Central District in Tarom County, Zanjan province, Iran.

== Demographics ==
=== Population ===
At the time of the 2006 National Census, the village's population was 155 in 41 households. The following census in 2011 counted 110 people in 35 households. The 2016 census measured the population of the village as 108 people in 38 households.
