= Gowhar, Zanjan =

Village in Zanjan province, Iran

Gowhar Persian: گوهر
- Village
- Location within Iran
- Coordinates: 37°01′33″N 48°42′46″E
- Country: Iran
- Province: Zanjan
- County: Tarom
- District: Chavarzaq
- Rural District: Chavarzaq

Population (2016)
  - Total: 604
- Time zone: UTC+3:30 (IRST)

Gowhar (Persian: گوهر) (Note: Also romanized as Guhar; also known as Kokhar) is a village in Chavarzaq Rural District of Chavarzaq District in Tarom County, Zanjan province, Iran.

== Demographics ==
At the time of the 2006 National Census, the village's population was 741 in 205 households. The following census in 2011 counted 675 people in 218 households. The 2016 census measured the population of the village as 604 people in 199 households.
