= Murestaneh =

Village in Zanjan province, Iran

Murestaneh Persian: مورستانه
- Village
- Location within Iran
- Coordinates: 36°50′51″N 48°55′30″E
- Country: Iran
- Province: Zanjan
- County: Tarom
- District: Chavarzaq
- Rural District: Dastjerdeh

Population (2016)
  - Total: 235
- Time zone: UTC+3:30 (IRST)

Murestaneh (Persian: مورستانه) (Note: Also romanized as Mūrestāneh; also known as Mūrestāneh-ye-Qāzī Bolāghī, Muristāneh, and Muristanekh) is a village in Dastjerdeh Rural District of Chavarzaq District in Tarom County, Zanjan province, Iran.

== Demographics ==
=== Population ===
At the time of the 2006 National Census, the village's population was 210 in 54 households. The following census in 2011 counted 233 people in 66 households. The 2016 census measured the population of the village as 235 people in 76 households.
