= Khasareh =

Village in Zanjan province, Iran

Khasareh Persian: خساره
- Village
- Location within Iran
- Coordinates: 37°07′57″N 48°41′48″E
- Country: Iran
- Province: Zanjan
- County: Tarom
- District: Central
- Rural District: Darram

Population (2016)
  - Total: 40
- Time zone: UTC+3:30 (IRST)

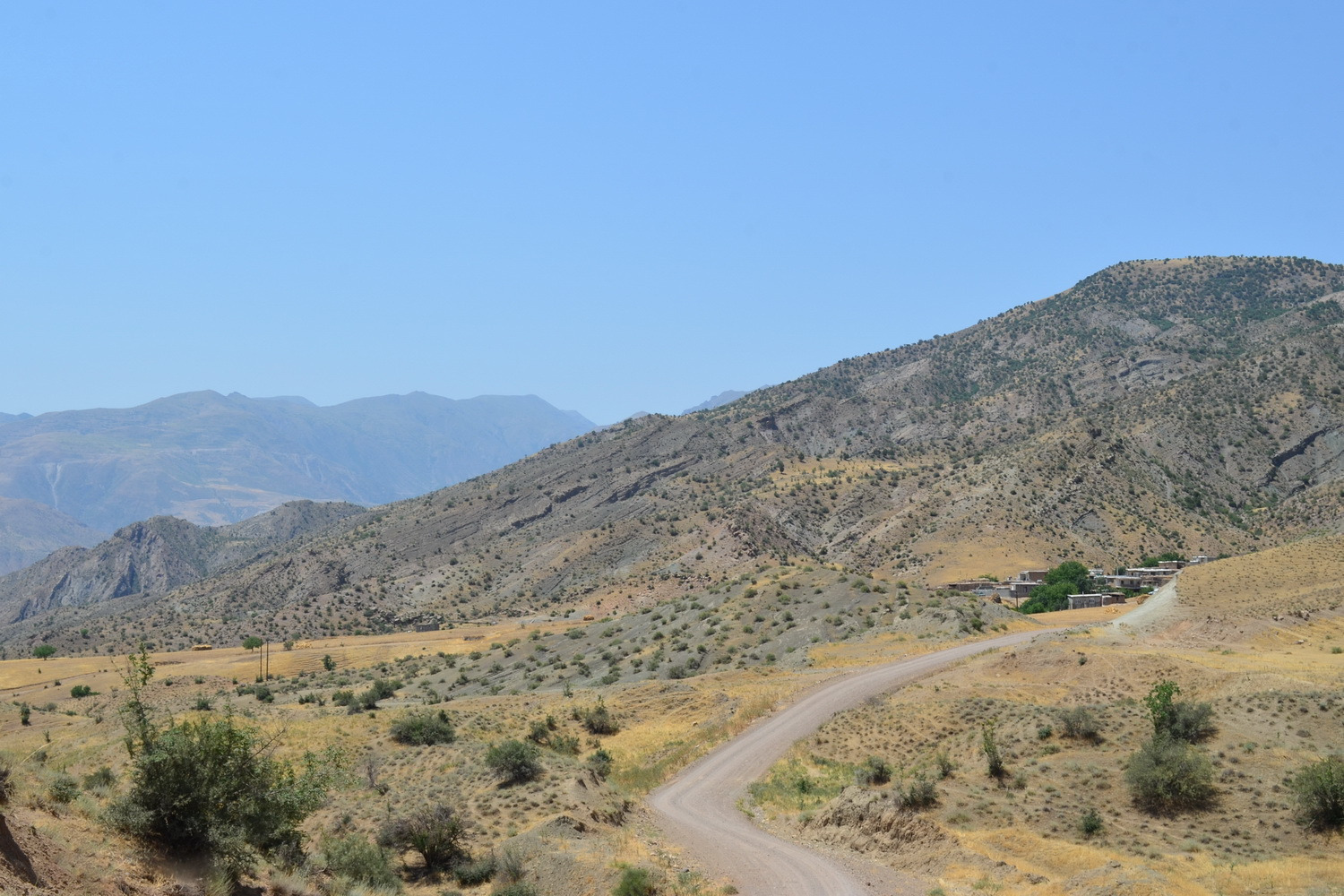
Khasareh

Khasareh (Persian: خساره) (Note: Also romanized as Khasāreh; also known as Ḩasāreh and Khasrakh) is a village in Darram Rural District of the Central District in Tarom County, Zanjan province, Iran.

== Demographics ==
=== Population ===
At the time of the 2006 National Census, the village's population was 78 in 23 households. The following census in 2011 counted 33 people in 13 households. The 2016 census measured the population of the village as 40 people in 16 households.
