= Bala Kuh, Zanjan =

Village in Zanjan province, Iran

Bala Kuh Persian: بالاكوه
- Village
- Location within Iran
- Coordinates: 37°09′58″N 48°48′00″E
- Country: Iran
- Province: Zanjan
- County: Tarom
- District: Central
- Rural District: Darram

Population (2016)
  - Total: 30
- Time zone: UTC+3:30 (IRST)

Bala Kuh (Persian: بالاكوه) (Note: Also romanized as Bālā Kūh; also known as Balakukh) is a village in Darram Rural District of the Central District in Tarom County, Zanjan province, Iran.

== Demographics ==
=== Population ===
At the time of the 2006 National Census, the village's population was 76 in 35 households. The following census in 2011 counted 26 people in 19 households. The 2016 census measured the population of the village as 30 people in 17 households.
