= Kaluim =

Village in Zanjan province, Iran

Kaluim Persian: كلوئيم
- Village
- Location within Iran
- Coordinates: 37°04′42″N 48°39′01″E
- Country: Iran
- Province: Zanjan
- County: Tarom
- District: Chavarzaq
- Rural District: Chavarzaq

Population (2016)
  - Total: 481
- Time zone: UTC+3:30 (IRST)

Kaluim (Persian: كلوييم) (Note: Also romanized as Kalū’īm, Koloe’īm, and Kolū’īm; also known as Kalvīm and Keleim) is a village in Chavarzaq Rural District of Chavarzaq District in Tarom County, Zanjan province, Iran.

== Demographics ==
At the time of the 2006 National Census, the village's population was 473 in 103 households. The following census in 2011 counted 481 people in 133 households. The 2016 census measured the population of the village as 481 people in 142 households.
