= Dastjerdeh, Zanjan =

Village in Zanjan province, Iran

Dastjerdeh Persian: دستجرده
- Village
- Location within Iran
- Coordinates: 36°51′06″N 48°56′47″E
- Country: Iran
- Province: Zanjan
- County: Tarom
- District: Chavarzaq
- Rural District: Dastjerdeh

Population (2016)
  - Total: 1,169
- Time zone: UTC+3:30 (IRST)

Dastjerdeh (Persian: دستجرده) (Note: Also romanized as Dast Jerdeh and Dastjerdeh; also known as Dastgīrdah and Dastgirdakh) is a village in, and the capital of, Dastjerdeh Rural District in Chavarzaq District of Tarom County, Zanjan province, Iran.

== Demographics ==
=== Population ===
At the time of the 2006 National Census, the village's population was 912 in 245 households. The following census in 2011 counted 1,014 people in 324 households. The 2016 census measured the population of the village as 1,169 people in 386 households. It was the most populous village in its rural district.
