= Shahrak-e Pavehrud =

Village in Zanjan province, Iran

Shahrak-e Pavehrud Persian: شهرک پاوه رود
- Village
- Location within Iran
- Coordinates: 37°03′51″N 48°42′46″E
- Country: Iran
- Province: Zanjan
- County: Tarom
- District: Central
- Rural District: Darram

Population (2016)
  - Total: 558
- Time zone: UTC+3:30 (IRST)

Shahrak-e Pavehrud (Persian: شهرک پاوه رود) is a village in Darram Rural District of the Central District in Tarom County, Zanjan province, Iran.

== Demographics ==
=== Population ===
At the time of the 2011 National Census, the village's population was 535 in 157 households. The following census in 2016 counted 558 people in 172 households.
