= Kaltan, Iran =

Village in Zanjan province, Iran

Kaltan Persian: كلتان
- Village
- Location within Iran
- Coordinates: 37°02′05″N 48°47′42″E
- Country: Iran
- Province: Zanjan
- County: Tarom
- District: Central
- Rural District: Darram

Population (2016)
  - Total: 115
- Time zone: UTC+3:30 (IRST)

Kaltan (Persian: كلتان) (Note: Also romanized as Kalatān, Kaletān, and Kaltān; also known as Golestān, Kalekhtan, Kaleyān, and Qal‘eh Tān) is a village in Darram Rural District of the Central District in Tarom County, Zanjan province, Iran.

== Demographics ==
=== Population ===
At the time of the 2006 National Census, the village's population was 122 in 35 households. The following census in 2011 counted 119 people in 33 households. The 2016 census measured the population of the village as 115 people in 38 households.
