= Kamar Kuh =

Village in Zanjan province, Iran

Kamar Kuh Persian: کمر کوه
- Village
- Location within Iran
- Coordinates: 37°02′08″N 48°40′15″E
- Country: Iran
- Province: Zanjan
- County: Tarom
- District: Chavarzaq
- Rural District: Chavarzaq

Population (2016)
  - Total: 268
- Time zone: UTC+3:30 (IRST)

Kamar Kuh (Persian: کمر کوه) (Note: Also romanized as Kamar Kūh; also known as Karam-Alu and Karmālīm; formerly known as Kareh Mālīm (کره ماليم)) is a village in Chavarzaq Rural District of Chavarzaq District in Tarom County, Zanjan province, Iran.

== Demographics ==
At the time of the 2006 National Census, the village's population was 279 in 57 households. The following census in 2011 counted 274 people in 71 households. The 2016 census measured the population of the village as 268 people in 84 households.
