= Jezlan Dasht =

Village in Zanjan province, Iran

Jezlan Dasht Persian: جزلاندشت
- Village
- Location within Iran
- Coordinates: 37°01′00″N 48°46′46″E
- Country: Iran
- Province: Zanjan
- County: Tarom
- District: Central
- Rural District: Darram

Population (2016)
  - Total: 426
- Time zone: UTC+3:30 (IRST)

Jezlan Dasht (Persian: جزلاندشت) (Note: Also romanized as Jazlān Dasht and Jezlān Dasht; also known as Dzhezrandasht, Jazārandasht, and Jezrāndasht) is a village in Darram Rural District of the Central District in Tarom County, Zanjan province, Iran.

== Demographics ==
=== Population ===
At the time of the 2006 National Census, the village's population was 443 in 115 households. The following census in 2011 counted 438 people in 127 households. The 2016 census measured the population of the village as 426 people in 128 households.
