= Vanisar =

Village in Zanjan province, Iran

Vanisar Persian: واني سر
- Village
- Location within Iran
- Coordinates: 36°52′52″N 48°53′40″E
- Country: Iran
- Province: Zanjan
- County: Tarom
- District: Chavarzaq
- Rural District: Dastjerdeh

Population (2016)
  - Total: 1,149
- Time zone: UTC+3:30 (IRST)

Vanisar (Persian: واني سر) (Note: Also romanized as Vani Sar and Vānī Sar; also known as Dārlī Sar) is a village in Dastjerdeh Rural District of Chavarzaq District in Tarom County, Zanjan province, Iran.

== Demographics ==
=== Population ===
At the time of the 2006 National Census, the village's population was 1,101 in 269 households. The following census in 2011 counted 1,259 people in 353 households. The 2016 census measured the population of the village as 1,149 people in 347 households.
