= Sorkhabad, Zanjan =

Village in Zanjan province, Iran

Sorkhabad Persian: سرخ اباد
- Village
- Location within Iran
- Coordinates: 37°04′20″N 48°34′22″E
- Country: Iran
- Province: Zanjan
- County: Tarom
- District: Chavarzaq
- Rural District: Chavarzaq

Population (2016)
  - Total: 233
- Time zone: UTC+3:30 (IRST)

Sorkhabad (Persian: سرخ اباد) (Note: Also romanized as Sorkhābād; also known as Surkhābād and Surkhanabad) is a village in Chavarzaq Rural District of Chavarzaq District in Tarom County, Zanjan province, Iran.

== Demographics ==
At the time of the 2006 National Census, the village's population was 262 in 61 households. The following census in 2011 counted 255 people in 68 households. The 2016 census measured the population of the village as 233 people in 73 households.
