= Astakul =

Village in Zanjan province, Iran

Astakul Persian: استاكول
- Village
- Location within Iran
- Coordinates: 36°56′14″N 48°52′57″E
- Country: Iran
- Province: Zanjan
- County: Tarom
- District: Central
- Rural District: Ab Bar

Population (2016)
  - Total: 871
- Time zone: UTC+3:30 (IRST)

Astakul (Persian: استاكول) (Note: Also romanized as Āstākūl; also known as Āstākol) is a village in Ab Bar Rural District of the Central District in Tarom County, Zanjan province, Iran.

== Demographics ==
=== Population ===
At the time of the 2006 National Census, the village's population was 847 in 189 households. The following census in 2011 counted 881 people in 249 households. The 2016 census measured the population of the village as 871 people in 251 households.
