= Kalleh Siran =

Village in Zanjan province, Iran

Kalleh Siran Persian: كله سيران
- Village
- Location within Iran
- Coordinates: 37°00′39″N 48°40′11″E
- Country: Iran
- Province: Zanjan
- County: Tarom
- District: Chavarzaq
- Rural District: Chavarzaq

Population (2016)
  - Total: 110
- Time zone: UTC+3:30 (IRST)

Kalleh Siran (Persian: كله سيران) (Note: Also romanized as Kalleh Sīrān and Koleh Sīrān; also known as Kaleh Sarān, Kalekh Seran, Koleh Sarān, Qal‘eh Saran, and Qal‘eh Seran) is a village in Chavarzaq Rural District of Chavarzaq District in Tarom County, Zanjan province, Iran.

== Demographics ==
At the time of the 2006 National Census, the village's population was 123 in 32 households. The following census in 2011 counted 120 people in 34 households. The 2016 census measured the population of the village as 110 people in 33 households.
