= Kukan (disambiguation) =

Kukan is a 1941 American documentary film. Kukan may also refer to:

== Places ==
=== Iran ===
- Kukan, Iran, a village in Tafresh County, Markazi Province
- Kukan, Khomeyn, a village in Khomeyn County, Markazi Province
- Kukan, Sistan and Baluchestan, a village in Hirmand County, Sistan and Baluchestan Province
- Kukan, Zanjan (disambiguation), two villages in Tarom County, Zanjan Province

=== Poland ===
- Kukań, a village in Gryfice County, West Pomeranian Voivodeship

== Other uses ==
- Kukan (surname)
