= Alarud =

Village in Zanjan province, Iran

Alarud Persian: علارود
- Village
- Location within Iran
- Coordinates: 36°56′24″N 48°44′47″E
- Country: Iran
- Province: Zanjan
- County: Tarom
- District: Chavarzaq
- Rural District: Chavarzaq

Population (2016)
  - Total: 183
- Time zone: UTC+3:30 (IRST)

Alarud (Persian: علارود) (Note: Also romanized as ‘Alārūd and A‘lārūd; also known as Alarva and Alārwah) is a village in Chavarzaq Rural District of Chavarzaq District in Tarom County, Zanjan province, Iran.

== Demographics ==
At the time of the 2006 National Census, the village's population was 170 in 36 households. The following census in 2011 counted 185 people in 46 households. The 2016 census measured the population of the village as 183 people in 48 households.
