= Sorkheh Sang =

Village in Zanjan province, Iran

Sorkheh Sang Persian: سرخه سنگ
- Village
- Location within Iran
- Coordinates: 37°04′20″N 48°47′10″E
- Country: Iran
- Province: Zanjan
- County: Tarom
- District: Central
- Rural District: Darram

Population (2016)
  - Total: 85
- Time zone: UTC+3:30 (IRST)

Sorkheh Sang (Persian: سرخه سنگ) (Note: Also known as Sorkh Sang) is a village in Darram Rural District of the Central District in Tarom County, Zanjan province, Iran.

== Demographics ==
=== Population ===
At the time of the 2006 National Census, the village's population was 172 in 48 households. The following census in 2011 counted 157 people in 72 households. The 2016 census measured the population of the village as 85 people in 37 households.
