= Qeshlaq-e Pavrud =

Village in Zanjan province, Iran

Qeshlaq-e Pavrud Persian: قشلاق پاورود
- Village
- Location within Iran
- Coordinates: 37°03′42″N 48°43′20″E
- Country: Iran
- Province: Zanjan
- County: Tarom
- District: Central
- Rural District: Darram

Population (2016)
  - Total: 49
- Time zone: UTC+3:30 (IRST)

Qeshlaq-e Pavrud (Persian: قشلاق پاورود) (Note: Also romanized as Qeshlāq-e Pāvrūd) is a village in Darram Rural District of the Central District in Tarom County, Zanjan province, Iran.

== Demographics ==
=== Population ===
At the time of the 2006 National Census, the village's population was 554 in 139 households. The following census in 2011 counted 64 people in 18 households. The 2016 census measured the population of the village as 49 people in 13 households.
