= Kalajabad =

Village in Zanjan province, Iran

Kalajabad Persian: کلج آباد
- Village
- Location within Iran
- Coordinates: 37°00′00″N 48°41′13″E
- Country: Iran
- Province: Zanjan
- County: Tarom
- District: Chavarzaq
- Rural District: Chavarzaq

Population (2016)
  - Total: 189
- Time zone: UTC+3:30 (IRST)

Kalajabad (Persian: کلج آباد) (Note: Also romanized as Kalajābād, Kallajābād, Kolejābād, and Koljābād; also known as Kalekh-Dzhava, Kollūjābād, Kolūchābād, Kolūjābād, Qal‘eh Jāwa, and Qal‘eh Jūq) is a village in Chavarzaq Rural District of Chavarzaq District in Tarom County, Zanjan province, Iran.

== Demographics ==
At the time of the 2006 National Census, the village's population was 212 in 42 households. The following census in 2011 counted 185 people in 53 households. The 2016 census measured the population of the village as 189 people in 61 households.
