= Kahya =

Kahya may refer to:

- Kahya, Iran, a village in Zanjan Province, Iran
- Ekrem Kahya, Turkish footballer
- Ramazan Kahya, Turkish footballer
- variant phonetic rendering of the Ottoman title kethüda

== See also ==
- Kahina
