= Shit, Zanjan =

Village in Zanjan province, Iran

Shit Persian: شيت
- Village
- Location within Iran
- Coordinates: 36°58′41″N 48°42′01″E
- Country: Iran
- Province: Zanjan
- County: Tarom
- District: Chavarzaq
- Rural District: Chavarzaq

Population (2016)
  - Total: 896
- Time zone: UTC+3:30 (IRST)

Shit (Persian: شيت) (Note: Also romanized as Sheet; also known as Chihi, Chin, Posht, and Shīd) is a village in Chavarzaq Rural District of Chavarzaq District in Tarom County, Zanjan province, Iran. The village is nearly 500 years old and has been declared a special tourism area of Zanjan province and Tarom County.

== Demographics ==
At the time of the 2006 National Census, the village's population was 804 in 192 households. The following census in 2011 counted 899 people in 235 households. The 2016 census measured the population of the village as 896 people in 284 households. It was the most populous village in its rural district.

== See also ==
- Wikipedia:Unusual place names
