= Hezarrud-e Sofla =

Village in Zanjan province, Iran

Hezarrud-e Sofla Persian: هزاررودسفلي
- Village
- Location within Iran
- Coordinates: 36°56′30″N 48°52′42″E
- Country: Iran
- Province: Zanjan
- County: Tarom
- District: Central
- Rural District: Ab Bar

Population (2016)
  - Total: 596
- Time zone: UTC+3:30 (IRST)

Hezarrud-e Sofla (Persian: هزاررودسفلي) (Note: Also romanized as Hezārrūd-e Soflá) is a village in Ab Bar Rural District of the Central District in Tarom County, Zanjan province, Iran.

== Demographics ==
=== Population ===
At the time of the 2006 National Census, the village's population was 617 in 132 households. The following census in 2011 counted 657 people in 178 households. The 2016 census measured the population of the village as 596 people in 174 households.
