= Alizin =

Alizin may refer to:

- Aglepristone, a drug
- Alizin, Iran, a village in Zanjan Province, Iran
