= Goman Dasht =

Village in Zanjan province, Iran

Goman Dasht Persian: گماندشت
- Village
- Location within Iran
- Coordinates: 37°02′30″N 48°48′19″E
- Country: Iran
- Province: Zanjan
- County: Tarom
- District: Central
- Rural District: Darram

Population (2016)
  - Total: 65
- Time zone: UTC+3:30 (IRST)

Goman Dasht (Persian: گماندشت) (Note: Also romanized as Gamān Dasht and Gomān Dasht; also known as Gamān, Gumbadasht, and Konbadasht) is a village in Darram Rural District of the Central District in Tarom County, Zanjan province, Iran.

== Demographics ==
=== Population ===
At the time of the 2006 National Census, the village's population was 128 in 36 households. The following census in 2011 counted 87 people in 28 households. The 2016 census measured the population of the village as 65 people in 23 households.
