= Zarni, Iran =

Village in Zanjan province, Iran

Zarni Persian: زرني
- Village
- Location within Iran
- Coordinates: 36°53′15″N 48°45′59″E
- Country: Iran
- Province: Zanjan
- County: Tarom
- District: Chavarzaq
- Rural District: Chavarzaq

Population (2016)
  - Total: 128
- Time zone: UTC+3:30 (IRST)

Zarni (Persian: زرني) (Note: Also romanized as Zarnī and Zerni) is a village in Chavarzaq Rural District of Chavarzaq District in Tarom County, Zanjan province, Iran.

== Demographics ==
At the time of the 2006 National Census, the village's population was 172 in 39 households. The following census in 2011 counted 135 people in 40 households. The 2016 census measured the population of the village as 128 people in 41 households.
