= Darram =

Village in Zanjan province, Iran

Darram Persian: درام
- Village
- Location within Iran
- Coordinates: 37°01′10″N 48°46′29″E
- Country: Iran
- Province: Zanjan
- County: Tarom
- District: Central
- Rural District: Darram

Population (2016)
  - Total: 1,701
- Time zone: UTC+3:30 (IRST)

Darram (Persian: درام) (Note: Also romanized as Darām, Darrām, and Derām) is a village in, and the capital of, Darram Rural District in the Central District of Tarom County, Zanjan province, Iran.

== Demographics ==
=== Population ===
At the time of the 2006 National Census, the village's population was 1,554 in 409 households. The following census in 2011 counted 1,859 people in 518 households. The 2016 census measured the population of the village as 1,701 people in 520 households. It was the most populous village in its rural district.
