= Harunabad-e Olya =

Village in Zanjan province, Iran

Harunabad-e Olya Persian: هارون اباد عليا
- Village
- Location within Iran
- Coordinates: 36°55′01″N 48°54′18″E
- Country: Iran
- Province: Zanjan
- County: Tarom
- District: Central
- Rural District: Ab Bar

Population (2016)
  - Total: 425
- Time zone: UTC+3:30 (IRST)

Harunabad-e Olya (Persian: هارون ابادعليا) (Note: Also romanized as Hārūnābād-e ‘Olyā; also known as Hārūnābād-e Bālā) is a village in Ab Bar Rural District of the Central District in Tarom County, Zanjan province, Iran.

== Demographics ==
=== Population ===
At the time of the 2006 National Census, the village's population was 444 in 101 households. The following census in 2011 counted 477 people in 126 households. The 2016 census measured the population of the village as 425 people in 128 households.
