= Jezla =

Village in Zanjan province, Iran

Jezla Persian: جزلا
- Village
- Location within Iran
- Coordinates: 36°59′09″N 48°44′23″E
- Country: Iran
- Province: Zanjan
- County: Tarom
- District: Chavarzaq
- Rural District: Chavarzaq

Population (2016)
  - Total: 727
- Time zone: UTC+3:30 (IRST)

Jezla (Persian: جزلا) (Note: Also romanized as Jazlā and Jezlā; also known as Gizla, Jīzlā, and Kizla) is a village in Chavarzaq Rural District of Chavarzaq District in Tarom County, Zanjan province, Iran.

== Demographics ==
At the time of the 2006 National Census, the village's population was 686 in 152 households. The following census in 2011 counted 752 people in 201 households. The 2016 census measured the population of the village as 727 people in 211 households.
