= Shaqaqi-ye Anzar =

Village in Zanjan province, Iran

Shaqaqi-ye Anzar Persian: شقاقي انذر
- Village
- Location within Iran
- Coordinates: 37°00′22″N 48°43′26″E
- Country: Iran
- Province: Zanjan
- County: Tarom
- District: Chavarzaq
- Rural District: Chavarzaq

Population (2016)
  - Total: 337
- Time zone: UTC+3:30 (IRST)

Shaqaqi-ye Anzar (Persian: شقاقي انذر) (Note: Also romanized as Shaqāqī Anẕar and Shaqāqī-ye Anẕar; also known as Shaqāq-e Anẕar (شقاق انذر)) is a village in Chavarzaq Rural District of Chavarzaq District in Tarom County, Zanjan province, Iran.

== Demographics ==
At the time of the 2006 National Census, the village's population was 317 in 72 households. The following census in 2011 counted 322 people in 86 households. The 2016 census measured the population of the village as 337 people in 102 households.
