= Kuh Kan-e Olya =

Village in Zanjan province, Iran

Kuh Kan-e Olya Persian: كوهكن عليا
- Village
- Location within Iran
- Coordinates: 36°53′48″N 48°56′47″E
- Country: Iran
- Province: Zanjan
- County: Tarom
- District: Central
- Rural District: Ab Bar

Population (2016)
  - Total: 379
- Time zone: UTC+3:30 (IRST)

Kuh Kan-e Olya (Persian: كوهكن عليا) (Note: Also romanized as Kūh Kan-e ‘Olyā; also known as Kūh Kan-e Bālā) is a village in Ab Bar Rural District of the Central District in Tarom County, Zanjan province, Iran.

== Demographics ==
=== Population ===
At the time of the 2006 National Census, the village's population was 452 in 104 households. The following census in 2011 counted 410 people in 117 households. The 2016 census measured the population of the village as 379 people in 123 households.
