= Goman, Iran =

Goman or Gaman (Persian: گمان), also rendered as Guman, in Iran may refer to:

- Goman, East Azerbaijan
- Gaman, Tabriz, East Azerbaijan Province
- Goman, West Azerbaijan
- Gaman, Tarom, Zanjan Province

== See also ==
- Gaman, a 1978 Indian film
- Gamanam (disambiguation)
- Guman (disambiguation)
