= Vanab, Zanjan =

Village in Zanjan province, Iran

Vanab Persian: وناب
- Village
- Location within Iran
- Coordinates: 37°04′47″N 48°48′38″E
- Country: Iran
- Province: Zanjan
- County: Tarom
- District: Central
- Rural District: Darram

Population (2016)
  - Total: Below reporting threshold
- Time zone: UTC+3:30 (IRST)

Vanab (Persian: وناب) (Note: Also romanized as Vanāb; also known as Bī Āb) is a village in Darram Rural District of the Central District in Tarom County, Zanjan province, Iran.

== Demographics ==
=== Population ===
At the time of the 2006 National Census, the village's population was 12 in four households. The following censuses in 2011 and 2016 measured the population as below the reporting threshold.
