= Shaqaqi-ye Chavarzaq =

Village in Zanjan province, Iran

Shaqaqi-ye Chavarzaq Persian: شقاقي چورزق
- Village
- Location within Iran
- Coordinates: 36°58′35″N 48°46′47″E
- Country: Iran
- Province: Zanjan
- County: Tarom
- District: Chavarzaq
- Rural District: Chavarzaq

Population (2016)
  - Total: 85
- Time zone: UTC+3:30 (IRST)

Shaqaqi-ye Chavarzaq (Persian: شقاقي چورزق) (Note: Also romanized as Shaqāqī-ye Chavarzaq) is a village in Chavarzaq Rural District of Chavarzaq District in Tarom County, Zanjan province, Iran.

== Demographics ==
At the time of the 2006 National Census, the village's population was 99 in 24 households. The following census in 2011 counted 116 people in 32 households. The 2016 census measured the population of the village as 85 people in 28 households.
