= Kahiya =

Village in Zanjan province, Iran

Kahiya Persian: كهيا
- Village
- Location within Iran
- Coordinates: 36°54′41″N 48°49′20″E
- Country: Iran
- Province: Zanjan
- County: Tarom
- District: Chavarzaq
- Rural District: Dastjerdeh

Population (2016)
  - Total: 582
- Time zone: UTC+3:30 (IRST)

Kahiya (Persian: كهيا) (Note: Also romanized as Kahyā; also known as Kahbā and Kakhiya) is a village in Dastjerdeh Rural District of Chavarzaq District in Tarom County, Zanjan province, Iran.

== Demographics ==
=== Population ===
At the time of the 2006 National Census, the village's population was 525 in 137 households. The following census in 2011 counted 626 people in 165 households. The 2016 census measured the population of the village as 582 people in 177 households.
