= Gamanam =

Gamanam (lit. 'journey') may refer to these Indian films:

- Gamanam (1994 film), directed by Sree Prakash
- Gamanam (2021 film), directed by Sujana Rao

== See also ==
- Gaman, a 1978 Indian film
- Gaman Palem, Indian artist
- Gamanashrama, a Carnatic raga in Indian classical music
- Guman, Iran (disambiguation)
