= Harunabad-e Sofla =

Village in Zanjan province, Iran

Harunabad-e Sofla Persian: هارون ابادسفلي
- Village
- Location within Iran
- Coordinates: 36°54′35″N 48°54′36″E
- Country: Iran
- Province: Zanjan
- County: Tarom
- District: Central
- Rural District: Ab Bar

Population (2016)
  - Total: 502
- Time zone: UTC+3:30 (IRST)

Harunabad-e Sofla (Persian: هارون ابادسفلي) (Note: Also romanized as Hārūnābād-e Soflá; also known as Hārūnābād, Hārūnābād-e Pā’īn, and Kharnabad) is a village in Ab Bar Rural District of the Central District in Tarom County, Zanjan province, Iran.

== Demographics ==
=== Population ===
At the time of the 2006 National Census, the village's population was 554 in 123 households. The following census in 2011 counted 600 people in 148 households. The 2016 census measured the population of the village as 502 people in 145 households.
