= Kuh Kan-e Sofla =

Village in Zanjan province, Iran

Kuh Kan-e Sofla Persian: كوهكن سفلي
- Village
- Location within Iran
- Coordinates: 36°53′08″N 48°56′01″E
- Country: Iran
- Province: Zanjan
- County: Tarom
- District: Central
- Rural District: Ab Bar

Population (2016)
  - Total: 137
- Time zone: UTC+3:30 (IRST)

Kuh Kan-e Sofla (Persian: كوهكن سفلي) (Note: Also romanized as Kūh Kan-e Soflá; also known as Kūh Kan, Kūh Kan-e Pā’īn, and Kukan) is a village in Ab Bar Rural District of the Central District in Tarom County, Zanjan province, Iran.

== Demographics ==
=== Population ===
At the time of the 2006 National Census, the village's population was 145 in 33 households. The following census in 2011 counted 158 people in 42 households. The 2016 census measured the population of the village as 134 people in 37 households.
