= Banarud =

Village in Zanjan province, Iran

Banarud Persian: بنارود
- Village
- Location within Iran
- Coordinates: 37°08′39″N 48°43′34″E
- Country: Iran
- Province: Zanjan
- County: Tarom
- District: Central
- Rural District: Darram

Population (2016)
  - Total: 38
- Time zone: UTC+3:30 (IRST)

Banarud (Persian: بنارود) (Note: Also romanized as Banārūd; also known as Banārī and Banaru) is a village in Darram Rural District of the Central District in Tarom County, Zanjan province, Iran.

== Demographics ==
=== Population ===
At the time of the 2006 National Census, the village's population was 25 in eight households. The following census in 2011 counted 32 people in 10 households. The 2016 census measured the population of the village as 38 people in 15 households.
