= Zarni =

Zarni may refer to:

- Maung Zarni (born 1963), Burmese educator, academic, and human rights activist
- Zarni, Afghanistan
- Zarni, Iran, a village in Zanjan Province, Iran
- Zarni, New Zealand
