= Kuh Kan =

Kuh Kan (Persian: كوهكن) may refer to:

- Kuh Kan-e Olya
- Kuh Kan-e Sofla
