= Qanqoli-ye Olya =

Village in Zanjan province, Iran

Qanqoli-ye Olya Persian: قانقلي عليا
- Village
- Location within Iran
- Coordinates: 36°53′24″N 48°58′46″E
- Country: Iran
- Province: Zanjan
- County: Tarom
- District: Central
- Rural District: Ab Bar

Population (2016)
  - Total: 163
- Time zone: UTC+3:30 (IRST)

Qanqoli-ye Olya (Persian: قانقلي عليا) (Note: Also romanized as Qānqolī ‘Olyā and Qānqolī-ye Olyā; also known as Kanghūli Alia, Kanguli-Alka, Qānqolī, and Qānqolī-ye Bālā) is a village in Ab Bar Rural District of the Central District in Tarom County, Zanjan province, Iran.

== Demographics ==
=== Population ===
At the time of the 2006 National Census, the village's population was 205 in 52 households. The following census in 2011 counted 192 people in 58 households. The 2016 census measured the population of the village as 163 people in 53 households.
