= Shaqaqi-ye Jezla =

Village in Zanjan province, Iran

Shaqaqi-ye Jezla Persian: شقاقي جزلا
- Village
- Location within Iran
- Coordinates: 36°58′32″N 48°44′42″E
- Country: Iran
- Province: Zanjan
- County: Tarom
- District: Chavarzaq
- Rural District: Chavarzaq

Population (2016)
  - Total: 536
- Time zone: UTC+3:30 (IRST)

Shaqaqi-ye Jezla (Persian: شقاقي جزلا) (Note: Also romanized as Shaqāqī-ye Jezlā) is a village in Chavarzaq Rural District of Chavarzaq District in Tarom County, Zanjan province, Iran.

== Demographics ==
At the time of the 2006 National Census, the village's population was 558 in 120 households. The following census in 2011 counted 563 people in 152 households. The 2016 census measured the population of the village as 536 people in 150 households.
