= Goman =

Goman may refer to:

- Goman, Iran (disambiguation), places in Iran
- Aleksey Goman, Russian musician and TV presenter
- Gauman, an alias of the Haitian Jean-Baptiste Perrier
- Goman-brand baked goods produced by subsidiaries of Gomanbakeren Holding AS for Coop Norge
- Goman Boat Limited, Canadian boat manufacturer
