= Qalat, Zanjan =

Village in Zanjan province, Iran

Qalat Persian: قلات
- Village
- Location within Iran
- Coordinates: 36°54′55″N 48°51′17″E
- Country: Iran
- Province: Zanjan
- County: Tarom
- District: Chavarzaq
- Rural District: Dastjerdeh

Population (2016)
  - Total: 607
- Time zone: UTC+3:30 (IRST)

Qalat (Persian: قلات) (Note: Also romanized as Qalāt; also known as Kalāt and Kyalyat) is a village in Dastjerdeh Rural District of Chavarzaq District in Tarom County, Zanjan province, Iran.

== Demographics ==
=== Population ===
At the time of the 2006 National Census, the village's population was 519 in 134 households. The following census in 2011 counted 580 people in 158 households. The 2016 census measured the population of the village as 607 people in 184 households.
