= Qanqoli-ye Sofla =

Village in Zanjan province, Iran

Qanqoli-ye Sofla Persian: قانقلي سفلي
- Village
- Location within Iran
- Coordinates: 36°52′18″N 48°58′32″E
- Country: Iran
- Province: Zanjan
- County: Tarom
- District: Central
- Rural District: Ab Bar

Population (2016)
  - Total: 197
- Time zone: UTC+3:30 (IRST)

Qanqoli-ye Sofla (Persian: قانقلي سفلي) (Note: Also romanized as Qānqolī Soflá and Qānqolī-ye Soflá; also known as Kahlā-ye Soflā, Kānghuli, Kānghūli Sifta, Kanguli-Sifta, Qānqolī, Qānqolī Chāy-ye Pā’īn, and Qānqolī-ye Pā’īn) is a village in Ab Bar Rural District of the Central District in Tarom County, Zanjan province, Iran. The village is also known by alternative names like Kahlā-ye Soflā, Kānghuli, and Qānqolī-ye Pā’īn. It’s a rural settlement, and the name "Sofla" typically indicates a "lower" village, often in contrast to a nearby "Olya" (upper) village, like Qanqoli-ye Olya in the same region.

== Demographics ==
=== Population ===
At the time of the 2006 National Census, the village's population was 271 in 68 households. The following census in 2011 counted 227 people in 62 households. The 2016 census measured the population of the village as 197 people in 60 households.
