= Hezarrud-e Olya =

Village in Zanjan province, Iran

Hezarrud-e Olya Persian: هزاررود عليا
- Village
- Location within Iran
- Coordinates: 36°57′57″N 48°55′01″E
- Country: Iran
- Province: Zanjan
- County: Tarom
- District: Central
- Rural District: Ab Bar

Population (2016)
  - Total: 1,044
- Time zone: UTC+3:30 (IRST)

Hezarrud-e Olya (Persian: هزاررود عليا) (Note: Also romanized as Hezārrūd-e ‘Olyā) is a village in Ab Bar Rural District of the Central District in Tarom County, Zanjan province, Iran.

== Demographics ==
=== Population ===
At the time of the 2006 National Census, the village's population was 1,191 in 264 households. The following census in 2011 counted 1,188 people in 315 households. The 2016 census measured the population of the village as 1,044 people in 305 households. It was the most populous village in its rural district.
