= Darram Rural District =

Rural district in Zanjan province, Iran

Darram Rural District Persian: دهستان درام
- Rural District
- Location within Iran
- Coordinates: 37°04′N 48°46′E
- Country: Iran
- Province: Zanjan
- County: Tarom
- District: Central
- Established: 1987
- Capital: Darram

Population (2016)
  - Total: 4,406
- Time zone: UTC+3:30 (IRST)

Darram Rural District (Persian: دهستان درام) is in the Central District of Tarom County, Zanjan province, Iran. Its capital is the village of Darram.

== Demographics ==
=== Population ===
At the time of the 2006 National Census, the rural district's population was 4,583 in 1,217 households. There were 4,703 inhabitants in 1,416 households at the following census of 2011. The 2016 census measured the population of the rural district as 4,406 in 1,423 households. The most populous of its 41 villages was Darram, with 1,701 people.

=== Other villages in the rural district ===
- Bala Kuh
- Banarud
- Bandargah
- Chenar
- Gavkhos
- Gholam Cham
- Goman Dasht
- Jezlan Dasht
- Kaltan
- Khasareh
- Koluch
- Mirzalu
- Nukian
- Qeshlaq-e Pavrud
- Quhijan
- Shahrak-e Pavehrud
- Siyahvarud
- Sorkheh Sang
- Tah Darreh
- Vanab
- Vazneh Sar
