= Zachkan =

Village in Zanjan province, Iran

Zachkan Persian: زاچكان
- Village
- Location within Iran
- Coordinates: 36°56′57″N 48°42′12″E
- Country: Iran
- Province: Zanjan
- County: Tarom
- District: Chavarzaq
- Rural District: Chavarzaq

Population (2016)
  - Total: 184
- Time zone: UTC+3:30 (IRST)

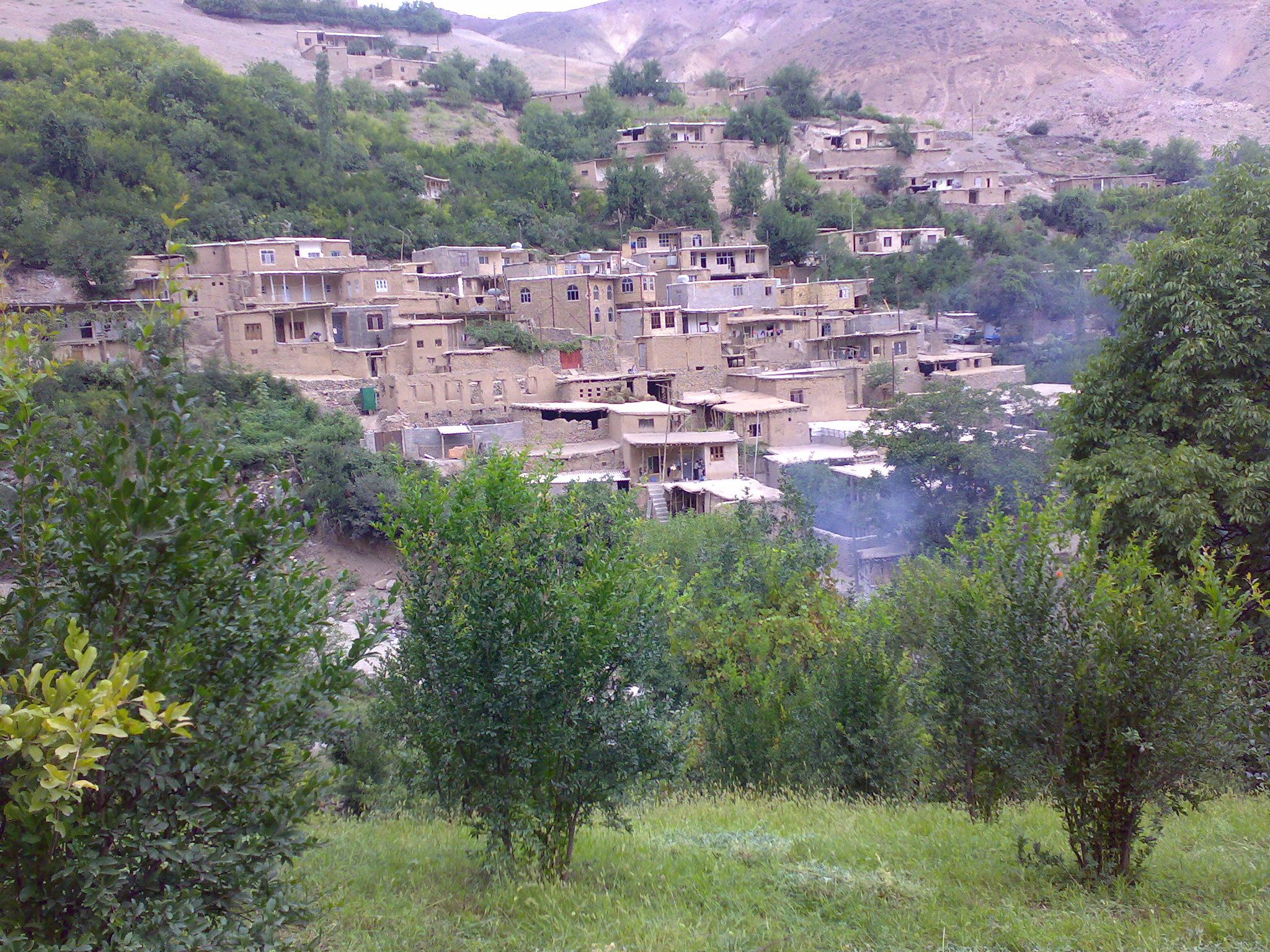
Zachkan Village

Zachkan (Persian: زاچكان) (Note: Also romanized as Zāchkān; also known as Zaikān, Zāj Kand, Zāj Kandī, Zājkān, Z̄āker, and Zaykan) is a village in Chavarzaq Rural District of Chavarzaq District in Tarom County, Zanjan province, Iran.

== Demographics ==
At the time of the 2006 National Census, the village's population was 195 in 56 households. The following census in 2011 counted 193 people in 55 households. The 2016 census measured the population of the village as 184 people in 56 households.
