= Ab Bar =

City in Zanjan province, Iran

Ab Bar Persian: آب بر
- City
- Location within Iran
- Coordinates: 36°55′34″N 48°57′14″E
- Country: Iran
- Province: Zanjan
- County: Tarom
- District: Central
- Established as a city: 1996

Population (2016)
  - Total: 8,091
- Time zone: UTC+3:30 (IRST)

Ab Bar (Persian: آب بر (Note: Also romanized as Āb Bar and Abbar; also known as Obar and Ubār) is a city in the Central District of Tarom County, Zanjan province, Iran, serving as capital of both the county and district. It is also the administrative center for Ab Bar Rural District. The village of Ab Bar was converted to a village in 1996.

== Demographics ==
=== Population ===
At the time of the 2006 National Census, the city's population was 4,918 in 1,358 households. The following census in 2011 counted 6,725 people in 1,991 households. The 2016 census measured the population of the city as 8,091 people in 2,494 households.
