= Ab Bar Rural District =

Rural district in Zanjan province, Iran

Ab Bar Rural District Persian: دهستان آب بر
- Rural District
- Location within Iran
- Coordinates: 37°01′N 49°01′E
- Country: Iran
- Province: Zanjan
- County: Tarom
- District: Central
- Established: 1987
- Capital: Ab Bar

Population (2016)
  - Total: 4,511
- Time zone: UTC+3:30 (IRST)

Ab Bar Rural District (Persian: دهستان آب بر) is in the Central District of Tarom County, Zanjan province, Iran. It is administered from the city of Ab Bar.

== Demographics ==
=== Population ===
At the time of the 2006 National Census, the rural district's population was 4,870 in 1,097 households. There were 4,908 inhabitants in 1,328 households at the following census of 2011. The 2016 census measured the population of the rural district as 4,511 in 1,334 households. The most populous of its 17 villages was Hezarrud-e Olya, with 1,044 people.

=== Other villages in the rural district ===
- Astakul
- Azizabad
- Harunabad-e Olya
- Harunabad-e Sofla
- Hezarrud-e Sofla
- Kordabad
- Kuh Kan-e Olya
- Kuh Kan-e Sofla
- Qanqoli-ye Olya
- Qanqoli-ye Sofla
