= Chavarzaq Rural District =

Rural district in Zanjan province, Iran

Chavarzaq Rural District Persian: دهستان چورزق
- Rural District
- Location within Iran
- Coordinates: 36°59′N 48°40′E
- Country: Iran
- Province: Zanjan
- County: Tarom
- District: Chavarzaq
- Established: 1987
- Capital: Chavarzaq

Population (2016)
  - Total: 9,624
- Time zone: UTC+3:30 (IRST)

Chavarzaq Rural District (Persian: دهستان چورزق) is in Chavarzaq District of Tarom County, Zanjan province, Iran. It is administered from the city of Chavarzaq.

== Demographics ==
=== Population ===
At the time of the 2006 National Census, the rural district's population was 9,616 in 2,283 households. There were 9,858 inhabitants in 2,742 households at the following census of 2011. The 2016 census measured the population of the rural district as 9,624 in 2,907 households. The most populous of its 30 villages was Shit, with 896 people.

=== Other villages in the rural district ===
- Alarud
- Anzar-e Jadid
- Anzar-e Qadim
- Arasht
- Gowhar
- Ich
- Jezla
- Jia
- Jowzargan
- Kalajabad
- Kalleh Siran
- Kaluim
- Kamar Kuh
- Kasran
- Shaqaqi-ye Anzar
- Shaqaqi-ye Chavarzaq
- Shaqaqi-ye Jezla
- Sorkhabad
- Sorkheh Misheh
- Tazeh Kand
- Validar
- Valis
- Zachkan
- Zarni
