= Chavarzaq, Tarom =

City in Zanjan province, Iran

Chavarzaq Persian: چورزق
- City
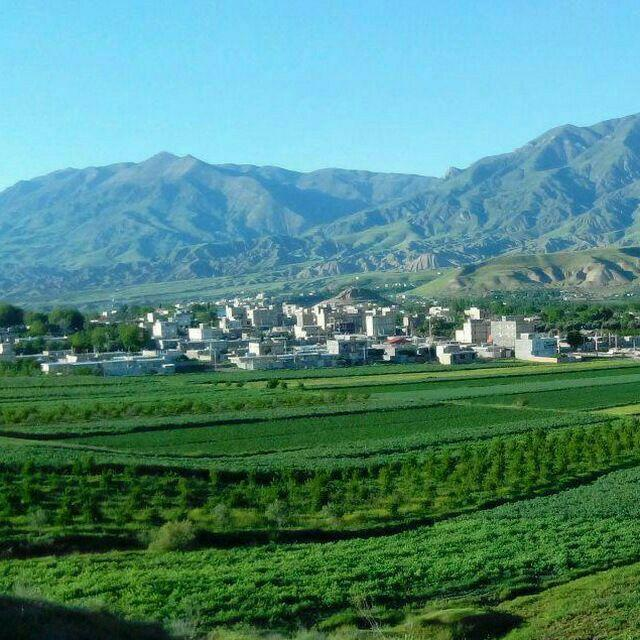

- Location within Iran
- Coordinates: 36°59′51″N 48°46′39″E
- Country: Iran
- Province: Zanjan
- County: Tarom
- District: Chavarzaq

Population (2016)
  - Total: 1,733
- Time zone: UTC+3:30 (IRST)

Chavarzaq (Persian: چورزق) (Note: Also romanized as Chūrzaq; also known as Chavarzagh, Chavarzakī, and Chevarzagh) is a city in, and the capital of, Chavarzaq District in Tarom County, Zanjan province, Iran. It also serves as the administrative center for Chavarzaq Rural District.

== Demographics ==
=== Population ===
At the time of the 2006 National Census, the city's population was 1,343 in 377 households. The following census in 2011 counted 1,753 people in 459 households. The 2016 census measured the population of the city as 1,733 people in 532 households.
