= Gaman Palem =

Indian illustrator

Gaman Palem is an Indian comic book illustrator. He has illustrated more than 100 Indian children's comics, working mainly on mythological subjects.

== Biography ==
Dr. Gaman Palem holds a Ph.D. in the field of journalism and mass communication. He is also an entrepreneur, media scholar, and an artist who uses the graphic novel format as a medium to express his ideas. With his understanding of Indian mythology as well as its regional versions and interpretations, he has created a series of works that blend the mythical characters to contemporary contexts. Specializing in contemporary communication methods and visual communication, he has a solid background in the areas of mass communication, advertising, graphic design, animation pre-production, and publishing.

Gaman's artistic style is influenced by Indian iconography, combining the traditional illustration techniques of watercolor, pen and ink with modern digital techniques. Gaman's first series of eight picture books, The Golden Mythology Series, won the National Award for Excellence in Printing Children's Books..

Gaman Palem has been actively teaching subjects pertaining to Visual education in Tamil Nadu, was a lecturer at Loyola College and a visiting faculty at Raffles international College. Having been a creative consultant in many publishing houses and animation studios he is a research associate where he undertakes various research projects. He lives and works in Chennai. His works have been published in major graphic magazines, journals and he has exhibited widely in India. He currently works as a design professor in the Vellore Institute of technology.
