= Banaru, Sistan and Baluchestan =

Banaru بنارو
- Village
- Location within Iran
- Coordinates: 25°38′14″N 60°59′47″E
- Country: Iran
- Province: Sistan and Baluchestan
- County: Chabahar
- Bakhsh: Central
- Rural District: Pir Sohrab

Population (2006)
  - Total: 125
- Time zone: UTC+3:30 (IRST)
  - Summer (DST): UTC+4:30 (IRDT)

Banaru (Persian: بنارو, also Romanized as Banārū and Benarow; also known as Bonāreh) is a village in Pir Sohrab Rural District, in the Central District of Chabahar County, Sistan and Baluchestan Province, Iran. According to the 2006 census, its population was 125, in 26 families.
