= Kuhkan =

Kuhkan كوهكن
- Village
- Location within Iran
- Coordinates: 31°07′04″N 61°44′26″E
- Country: Iran
- Province: Sistan and Baluchestan
- County: Hirmand
- Bakhsh: Qorqori
- Rural District: Qorqori

Population (2006)
  - Total: 305
- Time zone: UTC+3:30 (IRST)
  - Summer (DST): UTC+4:30 (IRDT)

Kuhkan (Persian: كوهكن, also Romanized as Kūhkan; also known as Kūkān) is a village in Qorqori Rural District, Qorqori District, Hirmand County, Sistan and Baluchestan Province, Iran. At the 2006 census, its population was 305, in 56 families.
