= Haruniyeh =

Haruniyeh هارونيه
- Village
- Location within Iran
- Coordinates: 38°17′05″N 45°54′09″E
- Country: Iran
- Province: East Azerbaijan
- County: Shabestar
- Bakhsh: Sufian
- Rural District: Mishu-e Jonubi

Population (2006)
  - Total: 193
- Time zone: UTC+3:30 (IRST)
  - Summer (DST): UTC+4:30 (IRDT)

Haruniyeh (Persian: هارونيه, also Romanized as Hārūnīyeh and Harūnīeh; also known as Gol Lar, Harūnābād, and Hūrlān) is a village in Mishu-e Jonubi Rural District, Sufian District, Shabestar County, East Azerbaijan Province, Iran. At the 2006 census, its population was 193, comprising 52 families. The village has a predominantly arid to semi-arid climate.
