= Zaj Kan-e Sofla =

Zaj Kan-e Sofla زاجكان سفلي
- Village
- Location within Iran
- Coordinates: 36°20′19″N 49°25′35″E
- Country: Iran
- Province: Qazvin
- County: Qazvin
- Bakhsh: Tarom Sofla
- Rural District: Kuhgir

Population (2006)
  - Total: 92
- Time zone: UTC+3:30 (IRST)
  - Summer (DST): UTC+4:30 (IRDT)

Zaj Kan-e Sofla (Persian: زاجكان سفلي, also Romanized as Zāj Kān-e Soflá, Zāchgān-e Soflá, Zāchkān-e Soflá, Zadzhkan-Sufla, and Zājkān Sufla; also known as Zāj Kān-e Pā’īn) is a village in Kuhgir Rural District, Tarom Sofla District, Qazvin County, Qazvin Province, Iran. At the 2006 census its population was 92, in 22 families.
