= Vanab, Lorestan =

Vanab وناب
- Village
- Location within Iran
- Coordinates: 34°07′13″N 47°48′04″E
- Country: Iran
- Province: Lorestan
- County: Delfan
- Bakhsh: Central
- Rural District: Nurabad

Population (2006)
  - Total: 127
- Time zone: UTC+3:30 (IRST)
  - Summer (DST): UTC+4:30 (IRDT)

Vanab (Persian: وناب, also Romanized as Vanāb) is a village in Nurabad Rural District, in the Central District of Delfan County, Lorestan Province, Iran. At the 2006 census, its population was 127, in 25 families.
