= Koman, Iran =

Koman كمان
- Village
- Location within Iran
- Coordinates: 39°05′07″N 47°08′47″E
- Country: Iran
- Province: East Azerbaijan
- County: Kaleybar
- Bakhsh: Central
- Rural District: Mulan

Population (2006)
  - Total: 136
- Time zone: UTC+3:30 (IRST)
  - Summer (DST): UTC+4:30 (IRDT)

Koman (Persian: كمان, also Romanized as Komān; also known as Gomān) is a village in Mulan Rural District, in the Central District of Kaleybar County, East Azerbaijan Province, Iran. At the 2006 census, its population was 136, in 27 families.
