= Gilvan, Zanjan =

City in Zanjan province, Iran

Gilvan Persian: گيلوان
- City
- Location within Iran
- Coordinates: 36°47′02″N 49°07′55″E
- Country: Iran
- Province: Zanjan
- County: Tarom
- District: Gilvan
- Established as a city: 2024

Population (2016)
  - Total: 2,508
- Time zone: UTC+3:30 (IRST)

Gilvan (Persian: گيلوان) (Note: Also romanized as Gīlavān and Gīlvān) is a city in, and the capital of, Gilvan District in Tarom County, Zanjan province, Iran. As a village, it was the capital of Gilvan Rural District

== Demographics ==
=== Population ===
At the time of the 2006 National Census, Gilvan's population was 2,036 in 541 households, when it was a village in Gilvan Rural District of the Central District. The following census in 2011 counted 2,426 people in 691 households. The 2016 census measured the population of the village as 2,508 people in 803 households. It was the most populous village in its rural district.

In 2019, the rural district was separated from the district in the formation of Gilvan District, and Gilvan was converted to a city in 2024.
