= Dastjerdeh Rural District =

Rural district in Zanjan province, Iran

Dastjerdeh Rural District Persian: دهستان دستجرده
- Rural District
- Location within Iran
- Coordinates: 36°54′N 48°53′E
- Country: Iran
- Province: Zanjan
- County: Tarom
- District: Chavarzaq
- Established: 1995
- Capital: Dastjerdeh

Population (2016)
  - Total: 7,446
- Time zone: UTC+3:30 (IRST)

Dastjerdeh Rural District (Persian: دهستان دستجرده) is in Chavarzaq District of Tarom County, Zanjan province, Iran. Its capital is the village of Dastjerdeh.

== Demographics ==
=== Population ===
At the time of the 2006 National Census, the rural district's population was 6,698 in 1,686 households. There were 7,309 inhabitants in 2,083 households at the following census of 2011. The 2016 census measured the population of the rural district as 7,446 in 2,305 households. The most populous of its 19 villages was Dastjerdeh, with 1,169 people.

=== Other villages in the rural district ===
- Dohneh
- Kahiya
- Murestaneh
- Qazi Bolaghi
- Razeh Band
- Sansiz
- Qalat
- Vanisar
