= Gilvan Rural District =

Rural district in Zanjan province, Iran

Gilvan Rural District Persian: دهستان گيلوان
- Rural District
- Location within Iran
- Coordinates: 36°50′N 49°04′E
- Country: Iran
- Province: Zanjan
- County: Tarom
- District: Gilvan
- Established: 1988
- Capital: Mamalan

Population (2016)
  - Total: 10,830
- Time zone: UTC+3:30 (IRST)

Gilvan Rural District (Persian: دهستان گيلوان) is in Gilvan District of Tarom County, Zanjan province, Iran. Its capital is the village of Mamalan. The previous capital of the rural district was the village of Gilvan, now a city.

== Demographics ==
=== Population ===
At the time of the 2006 National Census, the rural district's population (as a part of the Central District) was 10,913 in 2,716 households. There were 11,360 inhabitants in 3,227 households at the following census of 2011. The 2016 census measured the population of the rural district as 10,830 in 3,443 households. The most populous of its 41 villages was Gilvan (now a city), with 2,508 people.

=== Other villages in the rural district ===
- Anarestan
- Charazeh
- Deh Bahar
- Garehlu
- Hesarabad
- Jeyshabad
- Khorramabad Kahriz
- Parcham-e Qadim
- Pesar
- Qarqoli Cham
- Sowmaeh Bar
- Zehtarabad

The rural district was separated from the district in the formation of Gilvan District in 2019.
