= Gilvan District =

District in Zanjan province, Iran

Gilvan District Persian: بخش گيلوان
- District
- Location within Iran
- Coordinates: 36°52′N 49°01′E
- Country: Iran
- Province: Zanjan
- County: Tarom
- Established: 2019
- Capital: Gilvan
- Time zone: UTC+3:30 (IRST)

Gilvan District (Persian: بخش گيلوان) is in Tarom County, Zanjan province, Iran. Its capital is the city of Gilvan, whose population at the time of the 2016 National Census was 2,508 people in 803 households.

== History ==
In 2019, Gilvan Rural District was separated from the Central District in the formation of Gilvan District. The village of Gilvan was converted to a city in 2024.

== Demographics ==
=== Administrative divisions ===
Gilvan District
Administrative Divisions
Gilvan RD
Tashvir RD
Gilvan (city)
RD = Rural District
