= Chavarzaq District =

District in Zanjan province, Iran

Chavarzaq District Persian: بخش چورزق
- District
- Location within Iran
- Coordinates: 36°59′N 48°42′E
- Country: Iran
- Province: Zanjan
- County: Tarom
- Established: 1997
- Capital: Chavarzaq

Population (2016)
  - Total: 18,803
- Time zone: UTC+3:30 (IRST)

Chavarzaq District (Persian: بخش چورزق) is in Tarom County, Zanjan province, Iran. Its capital is the city of Chavarzaq.

== Demographics ==
=== Population ===
At the time of the 2006 National Census, the district's population was 17,655 in 4,346 households. The following census in 2011 counted 18,920 people in 5,284 households. The 2016 census measured the population of the district as 18,803 inhabitants in 5,744 households.

=== Administrative divisions ===
Chavarzaq District Population
Administrative Divisions	2006	2011	2016
Chavarzaq RD	9,616	9,858	9,624
Dastjerdeh RD	6,696	7,309	7,446
Chavarzaq (city)	1,343	1,753	1,733
Total	17,655	18,920	18,803
RD = Rural District
