= Central District (Tarom County) =

District in Zanjan province, Iran

Central District (Tarom County) Persian: بخش مرکزی شهرستان طارم
- District
- Location within Iran
- Coordinates: 37°01′N 48°54′E
- Country: Iran
- Province: Zanjan
- County: Tarom
- Established: 1997
- Capital: Ab Bar

Population (2016)
  - Total: 27,838
- Time zone: UTC+3:30 (IRST)

The Central District of Tarom County (Persian: بخش مرکزی شهرستان طارم) is in Zanjan province, Iran. Its capital is the city of Ab Bar.

== History ==
In 2019, Gilvan Rural District was separated from the district in the formation of Gilvan District.

== Demographics ==
=== Population ===
At the time of the 2006 National Census, the district's population was 25,284 in 6,388 households. The following census in 2011 counted 27,696 people in 7,962 households. The 2016 census measured the population of the district as 27,838 inhabitants in 8,694 households.

=== Administrative divisions ===
Central District (Tarom County) Population
Administrative Divisions	2006	2011	2016
Ab Bar RD	4,870	4,908	4,511
Darram RD	4,583	4,703	4,406
Gilvan RD (Note: Transferred to Gilvan District after the 2016 census)	10,913	11,360	10,830
Ab Bar (city)	4,918	6,725	8,091
Total	25,284	27,696	27,838
RD = Rural District
