= Tarom County =

County in Zanjan province, Iran

Tarom County Persian: شهرستان طارم
- County
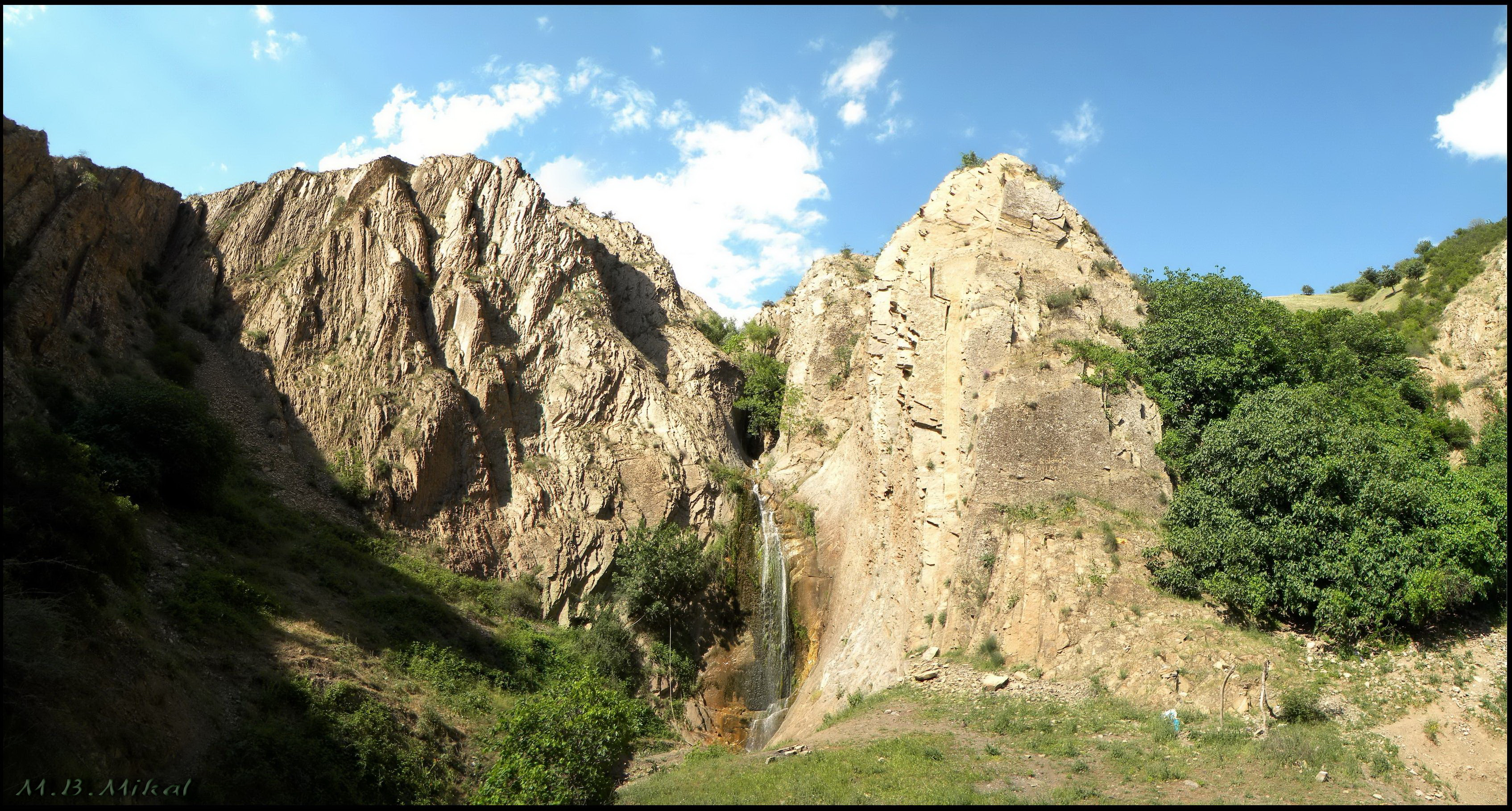
- The first waterfall of Zane Sar in Tarom

- Location of Tarom County in Zanjan province (top, pink)

- Location of Zanjan province in Iran
- Coordinates: 36°54′N 48°55′E
- Country: Iran
- Province: Zanjan
- Established: 1997
- Capital: Ab Bar
- Districts: Central, Chavarzaq, Gilvan

Population (2016)
  - Total: 46,641
- Time zone: UTC+3:30 (IRST)

Tarom County (Persian: شهرستان طارم) is in Zanjan province, Iran. Its capital is the city of Ab Bar.

== History ==
The region of Tarom is historically divided into two parts: Upper Tarom and Lower Tarom. Medieval Arabic geographers usually wrote the name as aṭ-Ṭārumayn, or "the two Taroms", reflecting this division. The mountainous Upper Tarom was historically counted as part of Daylam. The name "Tarom" was applied to a right-bank tributary of the Sefid Rud, and the region of Tarom comprised the river and its own tributaries.

An important location in Tarom was the castle and town of Semiran, which lay in Lower Tarom on the main highway leading to Sarab. The castle crowned a rocky mount above the lower town and had triple walls. Ibn Muhalhal visited here c. 943 and wrote that it was one of the main strongholds of the Daylamite kings and had about 2,850 houses.

The Buyid amir Fakhr al-Dawla captured Semiran in 989 from the Vahsudan dynasty. Al-Muqaddasi wrote about the same time that the fortress of Semiran had "lions of gold, and the sun and the moon" on its walls; the town's houses were built from mud brick. He counted Semiran as part of the Salārvand district.

Nasir-i Khusraw visited Semiran in 1046 during his pilgrimage to Mecca; he described it as the capital of Tarom. Its fortress, he wrote, was garrisoned by a thousand men and had an underground conduit to supply water. By the time Yaqut al-Hamawi visited Semiran in the early 1200s, the castle had been slighted by the Nizaris, although the ruins were still impressive enough that Yaqut called it "a mother of castles".

Another fortress that Yaqut mentioned was Qilāt, located in the mountains on the Daylam frontier. It was located atop a mountain and had belonged to the Nizaris of Alamut. Below it was a town with "excellent" markets; there was also a masonry bridge with many arches crossing the stream.

=== In the Nuzhat al-Qulub ===
The 14th-century author Hamdallah Mustawfi gave a detailed description of the two Taroms in his Nuzhat al-Qulub. He described the two regions as fertile for agriculture – they supplied the city of Soltaniyeh with most of its fruit, he wrote – and populated mostly by Sunnis of the Shafi'i madhhab. He wrote that a town called Firuzabad, which was in Lower Tarom, had formerly been the capital of the region, but by his lifetime Firuzabad had become "a complete ruin". A place called Andar, which was in Upper Tarom, had replaced it as Tarom's capital.

Mustawfi described the two Taroms as being divided into five districts. The first consisted of the dependencies of Qal'ah Tāj ("the crown castle"), which was in Upper Tarom. He said this district included about 100 villages; the most important were Jazlā, Shūrzad, Darām, Ḥayāt, Qalāt, Razīd, and Shīd.

The second district was based around the castle of Semiran, in Lower Tarom. This district had about 50 villages, with the most important being Alūn, Khawarnaq, Sharzūrlard, and Kalach. The third district was based around the castle of Firdaws, also in Lower Tarom; this district comprised about 20 villages, with the most important being Sarvān. The fourth district was based around, instead of a castle, two large villages: Nisbār and Barīdūn. It consisted of 8 hamlets that were dependencies of the two main villages. Mustawfi did not specified whether this district belonged to Upper or Lower Tarom.

The fifth and final district was Lower Dizābād; Mustawfi said nothing about this district's affiliation either. In any case, it had 25 villages; the most important were Gulhār, Gulchīn, and Balhal. The combined revenue of these five districts, according to Mustawfi, was 64,000 dinars.

=== Administrative changes ===
In 2019, Gilvan Rural District was separated from the Central District in the formation of Gilvan District, which included the new Tashvir Rural District. The village of Gilvan was elevated to the status of a city in 2024.

== Demographics ==
=== Population ===
At the time of the 2006 National Census, the county's population was 42,939 in 10,734 households. The following census in 2011 counted 46,616 people in 13,221 households. The 2016 census measured the population of the county as 46,641 in 14,438 households.

=== Administrative divisions ===
Tarom County's population history and administrative structure over three consecutive censuses are shown in the following table.

Tarom County Population
Administrative Divisions	2006	2011	2016
Central District	25,284	27,696	27,838
Ab Bar RD	4,870	4,908	4,511
Darram RD	4,583	4,703	4,406
Gilvan RD	10,913	11,360	10,830
Ab Bar (city)	4,918	6,725	8,091
Chavarzaq District	17,655	18,920	18,803
Chavarzaq RD	9,616	9,858	9,624
Dastjerdeh RD	6,696	7,309	7,446
Chavarzaq (city)	1,343	1,753	1,733
Gilvan District (Note: Established after the 2016 census)			
Gilvan RD			
Tashvir RD			
Gilvan (city) (Note: Became a city after the 2016 census)			
Total	42,939	46,616	46,641
RD = Rural District

== Geology ==
Tarom is part of the Tarom-Hashtjin Metallogenic Province, which is one of the most important epithermal regions in Iran. Lead, zinc, copper, iron, and manganese are prevalent. Compared to the Hashtjin part, copper and iron are more widespread in Tarom. The average copper content of plutonic bodies ranges from 220 to 260 ppm. Lead, zinc, and silver content are 600, 800, and 8 ppm respectively.

Gold deposits are found mixed in with some copper deposits, such as at Khalifeloo, Abbasabad, and Chargar. There are also gold deposits at Asadi and Ghez Ghal'e. Tarom also has relatively more alunite deposits than Hashtjin, including ones at Yuzbash Chay, Kamar Rud, Nasr Abad, Sirdan, Zajkan, and Zajkandi. There are also minor tungsten deposits, such as at Kuhian. Sericitization is less widespread in Tarom than in Hashtjin, and "greisen-type metasomatism" has not been reported in Tarom.

== See also ==
Media related to Tarom County at Wikimedia Commons
