= Arbat (disambiguation) =

Arbat may refer to:

== Places ==
=== Iran ===
- Arbat, Charuymaq, a village in East Azerbaijan Province
- Arbat, Meyaneh, a village in East Azerbaijan Province
- Arbat, Osku, a village in East Azerbaijan Province
- Arbat, Qazvin, a village in Qazvin Province
- Arbat-e Olya, a village in West Azerbaijan Province
- Arbat-e Sofla, a village in West Azerbaijan Province
- Arbat, Zanjan, a village in Zanjan Province

=== Kazakhstan ===
- Arbat (Almaty), a pedestrian zone in Almaty
- Arbat (Shymkent), a pedestrian zone in Shymkent

=== Russia ===
- Arbat District, an administrative district in central Moscow
- Arbat Street, a pedestrian street in Moscow
- Arbat Gates Square, part of Arbatskaya Square in Moscow
- New Arbat Avenue, a central avenue in Moscow, known for many parade routes

== Other places ==
- Arbat, Armenia, a village
- Arbat, Iraq, a town
- Arbatan, Nakhchivan or Arbat, Azerbaijan

== Other ==
- Children of the Arbat, a 1987 novel by Anatoli Rybakov
- Arbat Battalion, an irregular Russian military unit

== See also ==
- Arbatan (disambiguation)
- Arbatsky (disambiguation)
