= Aqkand (disambiguation) =

Aqkand is a city in East Azerbaijan Province, Iran.

Aqkand or Aq Kand (Persian: اقكند), also rendered as Ak-Kend, may also refer to various places in Iran:

- Aq Kand, Charuymaq, East Azerbaijan Province
- Aqkand-e Qareh Khezer, East Azerbaijan Province
- Aqkand-e Samaraq, East Azerbaijan Province
- Aq Kand, Kabudarahang, Hamadan Province
- Aq Kand, Razan, Hamadan Province
- Akh Kand, Divandarreh, Kurdistan Province
- Aqkand, West Azerbaijan
- Aq Kand-e Baruq, West Azerbaijan Province
- Aq Kand, Zanjan, Zanjan Province
- Aq Kand, Mahneshan, Zanjan Province
- Aq Kand, Qareh Poshtelu, Zanjan County, Zanjan Province
