= Owlamchi =

Village in West Azerbaijan province, Iran

Owlamchi Persian: اولامچي
- Village
- Location within Iran
- Coordinates: 36°59′11″N 46°47′39″E
- Country: Iran
- Province: West Azerbaijan
- County: Baruq
- District: Nokhtalu
- Rural District: Ajorluy-ye Sharqi

Population (2016)
  - Total: 297
- Time zone: UTC+3:30 (IRST)

Owlamchi (Persian: اولامچي) (Note: Also romanized as Owlāmchī and Ūlāmchī) is a village in Ajorluy-ye Sharqi Rural District of Nokhtalu District in Baruq County, West Azerbaijan province, Iran.

== Etymology ==
According to Vladimir Minorsky, the name of this village is derived from the Mongolian language and means "purveyor of relay horses".

== Demographics ==
=== Population ===
At the time of the 2006 National Census, the village's population was 360 in 70 households, when it was in Baruq District (Note: Renamed the Central District of Baruq County) of Miandoab County. The following census in 2011 counted 327 people in 78 households. The 2016 census measured the population of the village as 297 people in 77 households.

In 2021, the district was separated from the county in the establishment of Baruq County and renamed the Central District. The rural district was transferred to the new Nokhtalu District.
