= Badamlu, West Azerbaijan =

Village in West Azerbaijan province, Iran

Badamlu Persian: باداملو
- Village
- Location within Iran
- Coordinates: 36°51′45″N 46°50′13″E
- Country: Iran
- Province: West Azerbaijan
- County: Baruq
- District: Nokhtalu
- Rural District: Ajorluy-ye Sharqi

Population (2016)
  - Total: 237
- Time zone: UTC+3:30 (IRST)

Badamlu (Persian: باداملو) (Note: Also romanized as Bādāmlū) is a village in Ajorluy-ye Sharqi Rural District of Nokhtalu District in Baruq County, West Azerbaijan province, Iran.

== Demographics ==
=== Population ===
At the time of the 2006 National Census, the village's population was 264 in 53 households, when it was in Baruq District (Note: Renamed the Central District of Baruq County) of Miandoab County. The following census in 2011 counted 215 people in 57 households. The 2016 census measured the population of the village as 237 people in 69 households.

In 2021, the district was separated from the county in the establishment of Baruq County and renamed the Central District. The rural district was transferred to the new Nokhtalu District.
