= Shurjeh Kord =

Village in West Azerbaijan province, Iran

Shurjeh Kord Persian: شورجه كرد
- Village
- Location within Iran
- Coordinates: 36°56′10″N 46°23′39″E
- Country: Iran
- Province: West Azerbaijan
- County: Baruq
- District: Central
- Rural District: Nader Goli

Population (2016)
  - Total: 241
- Time zone: UTC+3:30 (IRST)

Shurjeh Kord (Persian: شورجه كرد) (Note: Also romanized as Shūrjeh Kord; also known as Shūrjeh and Shūrjeh Ḩamīdīyeh (شورجه حمیدیه)) is a village in Nader Goli Rural District of the Central District (Note: Formerly Baruq District of Miandoab County) in Baruq County, West Azerbaijan province, Iran.

== Demographics ==
=== Population ===
At the time of the 2006 National Census, the village's population was 357 in 83 households, when it was in Baruq Rural District of Baruq District (Note: Renamed the Central District of Baruq County) in Miandoab County. The following census in 2011 counted 290 people in 97 households. The 2016 census measured the population of the village as 241 people in 79 households.

In 2021, the district was separated from the county in the establishment of Baruq County and renamed the Central District. Shurjeh Kord was transferred to Nader Goli Rural District created in the same district.
