= Qermezi Bolagh =

Village in West Azerbaijan province, Iran

Qermezi Bolagh Persian: قرمزي بلاغ
- Village
- Location within Iran
- Coordinates: 37°02′29″N 46°25′10″E
- Country: Iran
- Province: West Azerbaijan
- County: Baruq
- District: Central
- Rural District: Nader Goli

Population (2016)
  - Total: 182
- Time zone: UTC+3:30 (IRST)

Qermezi Bolagh (Persian: قرمزي بلاغ) (Note: Also romanized as Qermezī Bolāgh; also known as Qermez Bolāgh) is a village in Nader Goli Rural District of the Central District (Note: Formerly Baruq District of Miandoab County) in Baruq County, West Azerbaijan province, Iran.

== Demographics ==
=== Population ===
At the time of the 2006 National Census, the village's population was 179 in 35 households, when it was in Baruq Rural District of Baruq District (Note: Renamed the Central District of Baruq County) in Miandoab County. The following census in 2011 counted 156 people in 39 households. The 2016 census measured the population of the village as 182 people in 55 households.

In 2021, the district was separated from the county in the establishment of Baruq County and renamed the Central District. Qermezi Bolagh was transferred to Nader Goli Rural District created in the same district.
