= Amirabad, Baruq =

Village in West Azerbaijan province, Iran

Amirabad Persian: اميراباد
- Village
- Location within Iran
- Coordinates: 36°59′25″N 46°21′22″E
- Country: Iran
- Province: West Azerbaijan
- County: Baruq
- District: Central
- Rural District: Nader Goli

Population (2016)
  - Total: 50
- Time zone: UTC+3:30 (IRST)

Amirabad (Persian: اميراباد) (Note: Also romanized as Amīrābād) is a village in Nader Goli Rural District of the Central District (Note: Formerly Baruq District of Miandoab County) in Baruq County, West Azerbaijan province, Iran.

== Demographics ==
=== Population ===
At the time of the 2006 National Census, the village's population was 51 in nine households, when it was in Baruq Rural District of Baruq District (Note: Renamed the Central District of Baruq County) in Miandoab County. The following census in 2011 counted 60 people in 16 households. The 2016 census measured the population of the village as 50 people in 13 households.

In 2021, the district was separated from the county in the establishment of Baruq County and renamed the Central District. Amirabad was transferred to Nader Goli Rural District created in the same district.
