= Ali Bolaghi, Baruq =

Village in West Azerbaijan province, Iran

Ali Bolaghi Persian: علي بلاغي
- Village
- Location within Iran
- Coordinates: 37°04′43″N 46°28′03″E
- Country: Iran
- Province: West Azerbaijan
- County: Baruq
- District: Central
- Rural District: Nader Goli

Population (2016)
  - Total: 196
- Time zone: UTC+3:30 (IRST)

Ali Bolaghi (Persian: علي بلاغي) (Note: Also romanized as ‘Alī Bolāghī) is a village in Nader Goli Rural District of the Central District (Note: Formerly Baruq District of Miandoab County) in Baruq County, West Azerbaijan province, Iran.

== Demographics ==
=== Population ===
At the time of the 2006 National Census, the village's population was 250 in 52 households, when it was in Baruq Rural District of Baruq District (Note: Renamed the Central District of Baruq County) in Miandoab County. The following census in 2011 counted 186 people in 44 households. The 2016 census measured the population of the village as 196 people in 64 households.

In 2021, the district was separated from the county in the establishment of Baruq County and renamed the Central District. Ali Bolaghi was transferred to Nader Goli Rural District created in the same district.
