= Yasti Kand =

Village in West Azerbaijan province, Iran

Yasti Kand Persian: ياستي كند
- Village
- Location within Iran
- Coordinates: 37°00′55″N 46°43′23″E
- Country: Iran
- Province: West Azerbaijan
- County: Baruq
- District: Nokhtalu
- Rural District: Ajorluy-ye Sharqi

Population (2016)
  - Total: 259
- Time zone: UTC+3:30 (IRST)

Yasti Kand (Persian: ياستي كند) (Note: Also romanized as Yāstī Kand; also known as Yāsī Kand) is a village in Ajorluy-ye Sharqi Rural District of Nokhtalu District in Baruq County, West Azerbaijan province, Iran.

== Demographics ==
=== Population ===
At the time of the 2006 National Census, the village's population was 331 in 73 households, when it was in Baruq District (Note: Renamed the Central District of Baruq County) of Miandoab County. The following census in 2011 counted 236 people in 56 households. The 2016 census measured the population of the village as 259 people in 75 households.

In 2021, the district was separated from the county in the establishment of Baruq County and renamed the Central District. The rural district was transferred to the new Nokhtalu District.
