= Heydar Baghi =

Village in West Azerbaijan province, Iran

Heydar Baghi Persian: حيدرباغي
- Village
- Location within Iran
- Coordinates: 36°57′23″N 46°47′16″E
- Country: Iran
- Province: West Azerbaijan
- County: Baruq
- District: Nokhtalu
- Rural District: Ajorluy-ye Sharqi

Population (2016)
  - Total: 329
- Time zone: UTC+3:30 (IRST)

Heydar Baghi (Persian: حيدرباغي) (Note: Also romanized as Ḩeydar Bāghī) is a village in Ajorluy-ye Sharqi Rural District of Nokhtalu District in Baruq County, West Azerbaijan province, Iran.

== Demographics ==
=== Population ===
At the time of the 2006 National Census, the village's population was 437 in 92 households, when it was in Baruq District (Note: Renamed the Central District of Baruq County) of Miandoab County. The following census in 2011 counted 385 people in 104 households. The 2016 census measured the population of the village as 329 people in 96 households.

In 2021, the district was separated from the county in the establishment of Baruq County and renamed the Central District. The rural district was transferred to the new Nokhtalu District.
