= Dash Alti, West Azerbaijan =

Village in West Azerbaijan province, Iran

Dash Alti Persian: داش التي
- Village
- Location within Iran
- Coordinates: 36°55′35″N 46°25′34″E
- Country: Iran
- Province: West Azerbaijan
- County: Baruq
- District: Central
- Rural District: Nader Goli

Population (2016)
  - Total: 20
- Time zone: UTC+3:30 (IRST)

Dash Alti (Persian: داش التي) (Note: Also romanized as Dāsh Āltī) is a village in Nader Goli Rural District of the Central District (Note: Formerly Baruq District of Miandoab County) in Baruq County, West Azerbaijan province, Iran.

== Demographics ==
=== Population ===
At the time of the 2006 National Census, the village's population was 40 in eight households, when it was in Baruq Rural District of Baruq District (Note: Renamed the Central District of Baruq County) in Miandoab County. The following census in 2011 counted 18 people in five households. The 2016 census measured the population of the village as 20 people in five households.

In 2021, the district was separated from the county in the establishment of Baruq County and renamed the Central District. Dash Alti was transferred to Nader Goli Rural District created in the same district.
