= Hamid, West Azerbaijan =

Village in West Azerbaijan province, Iran

Hamid Persian: حميد
- Village
- Location within Iran
- Coordinates: 36°59′39″N 46°20′49″E
- Country: Iran
- Province: West Azerbaijan
- County: Baruq
- District: Central
- Rural District: Nader Goli

Population (2016)
  - Total: 765
- Time zone: UTC+3:30 (IRST)

Hamid (Persian: حميد) (Note: Also romanized as Ḩamīd) is a village in Nader Goli Rural District of the Central District (Note: Formerly Baruq District of Miandoab County) in Baruq County, West Azerbaijan province, Iran.

== Demographics ==
=== Population ===
At the time of the 2006 National Census, the village's population was 803 in 174 households, when it was in Baruq Rural District of Baruq District (Note: Renamed the Central District of Baruq County) in Miandoab County. The following census in 2011 counted 857 people in 234 households. The 2016 census measured the population of the village as 765 people in 244 households.

In 2021, the district was separated from the county in the establishment of Baruq County and renamed the Central District. Hamid was transferred to Nader Goli Rural District created in the same district.
