= Qoroqchi =

Village in West Azerbaijan province, Iran

Qoroqchi Persian: قرقچي
- Village
- Location within Iran
- Coordinates: 36°59′37″N 46°32′06″E
- Country: Iran
- Province: West Azerbaijan
- County: Baruq
- District: Nokhtalu
- Rural District: Ajorluy-ye Gharbi

Population (2016)
  - Total: 133
- Time zone: UTC+3:30 (IRST)

Qoroqchi (Persian: قرقچي) (Note: Also romanized as Qoroqchī) is a village in, and the capital of, Ajorluy-ye Gharbi Rural District in Nokhtalu District of Baruq County, West Azerbaijan province, Iran.

== Demographics ==
=== Population ===
At the time of the 2006 National Census, the village's population was 45 in 10 households, when it was in Baruq District (Note: Renamed the Central District of Baruq County) of Miandoab County. The following census in 2011 counted 24 people in 7 households. The 2016 census measured the population of the village as 133 people in 45 households.

In 2021, the district was separated from the county in the establishment of Baruq County and renamed the Central District. The rural district was transferred to the new Nokhtalu District.
