= Akh Kand =

Akh Kand (Persian: آخكند) may refer to:

- Akh Kand, Divandarreh
- Akh Kand, Saqqez

== See also ==
- Aqkand (disambiguation)
