= Nokhtalu =

Village in West Azerbaijan province, Iran

Nokhtalu Persian: نختالو
- Village
- Location within Iran
- Coordinates: 36°59′27″N 46°41′28″E
- Country: Iran
- Province: West Azerbaijan
- County: Baruq
- District: Nokhtalu
- Rural District: Ajorluy-ye Sharqi

Population (2016)
  - Total: 127
- Time zone: UTC+3:30 (IRST)

Nokhtalu (Persian: نختالو) (Note: Also romanized as Nokhţalū, Nokhtalū, and Nokhtālū) is a village in, and the former capital of, Ajorluy-ye Sharqi Rural District in Nokhtalu District of Baruq County, West Azerbaijan province, Iran, serving as capital of the district. The capital of the rural district has been transferred to the village of Zagheh.

== Demographics ==
=== Population ===
At the time of the 2006 National Census, the village's population was 189 in 38 households, when it was in Baruq Rural District of Baruq District (Note: Renamed the Central District of Baruq County) in Miandoab County. The following census in 2011 counted 151 people in 36 households. The 2016 census measured the population of the village as 127 people in 38 households.

In 2021, the district was separated from the county in the establishment of Baruq County and renamed the Central District. Nokhtalu was transferred to Ajorluy-ye Sharqi Rural District of the new Nokhtalu District.
