= Zaranji =

Village in West Azerbaijan province, Iran

Zaranji Persian: زارنجي
- Village
- Location within Iran
- Coordinates: 36°53′06″N 46°29′37″E
- Country: Iran
- Province: West Azerbaijan
- County: Baruq
- District: Nokhtalu
- Rural District: Ajorluy-ye Gharbi

Population (2016)
  - Total: 308
- Time zone: UTC+3:30 (IRST)

Zaranji (Persian: زارنجي) (Note: Also romanized as Zāranjī) is a village in Ajorluy-ye Gharbi Rural District of Nokhtalu District in Baruq County, West Azerbaijan province, Iran.

== Demographics ==
=== Population ===
At the time of the 2006 National Census, the village's population was 459 in 112 households, when it was in Baruq District (Note: Renamed the Central District of Baruq County) of Miandoab County. The following census in 2011 counted 361 people in 104 households. The 2016 census measured the population of the village as 308 people in 103 households.

In 2021, the district was separated from the county in the establishment of Baruq County and renamed the Central District. The rural district was transferred to the new Nokhtalu District.
