= Sayenjeq =

Village in West Azerbaijan province, Iran

Sayenjeq Persian: ساينجق
- Village
- Location within Iran
- Coordinates: 37°03′53″N 46°26′18″E
- Country: Iran
- Province: West Azerbaijan
- County: Baruq
- District: Central
- Rural District: Nader Goli

Population (2016)
  - Total: 114
- Time zone: UTC+3:30 (IRST)

Sayenjeq (Persian: ساينجق) (Note: Also romanized as Sāyenjeq; also known as Sārīnjeq and Sāyenjīq) is a village in Nader Goli Rural District of the Central District (Note: Formerly Baruq District of Miandoab County) in Baruq County, West Azerbaijan province, Iran.

== Demographics ==
=== Population ===
At the time of the 2006 National Census, the village's population was 124 in 25 households, when it was in Baruq Rural District of Baruq District (Note: Renamed the Central District of Baruq County) in Miandoab County. The following census in 2011 counted 109 people in 25 households. The 2016 census measured the population of the village as 114 people in 29 households.

In 2021, the district was separated from the county in the establishment of Baruq County and renamed the Central District. Sayenjeq was transferred to Nader Goli Rural District created in the same district.
