= Zagheh, Baruq =

Village in West Azerbaijan province, Iran

Zagheh Persian: زاغه
- Village
- Location within Iran
- Coordinates: 36°59′20″N 46°45′02″E
- Country: Iran
- Province: West Azerbaijan
- County: Baruq
- District: Nokhtalu
- Rural District: Ajorluy-ye Sharqi

Population (2016)
  - Total: 254
- Time zone: UTC+3:30 (IRST)

Zagheh (Persian: زاغه) (Note: Also romanized as Zāgheh; also known as Zāgheh-ye Ḩoseynābād) is a village in, and the capital of, Ajorluy-ye Sharqi Rural District in Nokhtalu District of Baruq County, West Azerbaijan province, Iran. The previous capital of the rural district was the village of Nokhtalu.

== Demographics ==
=== Population ===
At the time of the 2006 National Census, the village's population was 315 in 64 households, when it was in Baruq District (Note: Renamed the Central District of Baruq County) of Miandoab County. The following census in 2011 counted 291 people in 72 households. The 2016 census measured the population of the village as 254 people in 73 households.

In 2021, the district was separated from the county in the establishment of Baruq County and renamed the Central District. The rural district was transferred to the new Nokhtalu District.
