= Qareh Saqqal, West Azerbaijan =

Village in West Azerbaijan province, Iran

Qareh Saqqal Persian: قره سقال
- Village
- Location within Iran
- Coordinates: 36°57′40″N 46°20′26″E
- Country: Iran
- Province: West Azerbaijan
- County: Baruq
- District: Central
- Rural District: Nader Goli

Population (2016)
  - Total: 653
- Time zone: UTC+3:30 (IRST)

Qareh Saqqal (Persian: قره سقال) (Note: Also romanized as Qareh Saqāl and Qareh Saqqāl) is a village in Nader Goli Rural District of the Central District (Note: Formerly Baruq District of Miandoab County) in Baruq County, West Azerbaijan province, Iran.

== Demographics ==
=== Population ===
At the time of the 2006 National Census, the village's population was 737 in 152 households, when it was in Baruq Rural District of Baruq District (Note: Renamed the Central District of Baruq County) in Miandoab County. The following census in 2011 counted 717 people in 206 households. The 2016 census measured the population of the village as 653 people in 202 households.

In 2021, the district was separated from the county in the establishment of Baruq County and renamed the Central District. Qareh Saqqal was transferred to Nader Goli Rural District created in the same district.
