= Jan Aqa =

Village in West Azerbaijan province, Iran

Jan Aqa Persian: جان اقا
- Village
- Location within Iran
- Coordinates: 36°55′09″N 46°28′11″E
- Country: Iran
- Province: West Azerbaijan
- County: Baruq
- District: Nokhtalu
- Rural District: Ajorluy-ye Gharbi

Population (2016)
  - Total: 237
- Time zone: UTC+3:30 (IRST)

Jan Aqa (Persian: جان اقا) (Note: Also romanized as Jān Āqā) is a village in Ajorluy-ye Gharbi Rural District of Nokhtalu District in Baruq County, West Azerbaijan province, Iran.

== Demographics ==
=== Population ===
At the time of the 2006 National Census, the village's population was 273 in 66 households, when it was in Baruq District (Note: Renamed the Central District of Baruq County) of Miandoab County. The following census in 2011 counted 234 people in 62 households. The 2016 census measured the population of the village as 237 people in 77 households.

In 2021, the district was separated from the county in the establishment of Baruq County and renamed the Central District. The rural district was transferred to the new Nokhtalu District.
