= Teymur Kandi =

Village in West Azerbaijan province, Iran

Teymur Kandi Persian: تيمور کندي
- Village
- Location within Iran
- Coordinates: 36°54′11″N 46°48′16″E
- Country: Iran
- Province: West Azerbaijan
- County: Baruq
- District: Nokhtalu
- Rural District: Ajorluy-ye Sharqi

Population (2016)
  - Total: 366
- Time zone: UTC+3:30 (IRST)

Teymur Kandi (Persian: تيمور کندي) (Note: Also romanized as Tīmūr Kandī; formerly known as Mohammadqoli Qeshlaq (محمدقلي قشلاق), also romanized as Moḩammadqolī Qeshlāq; also known as Moḩammad ‘Alī Qeshlāqī) is a village in Ajorluy-ye Sharqi Rural District of Nokhtalu District in Baruq County, West Azerbaijan province, Iran.

== Demographics ==
=== Population ===
At the time of the 2006 National Census, the village's population (as Mohammadqoli Qeshlaq) was 444 in 77 households, when it was in Baruq District (Note: Renamed the Central District of Baruq County) of Miandoab County. The following census in 2011 counted 339 people in 84 households, by which time the village's name had been changed to Teymur Kandi. The 2016 census measured the population of the village as 366 people in 93 households. It was the most populous village in its rural district.

In 2021, the district was separated from the county in the establishment of Baruq County and renamed the Central District. The rural district was transferred to the new Nokhtalu District.
