= Hajji Kandi, West Azerbaijan =

Village in West Azerbaijan province, Iran

Hajji Kandi Persian: حاجي كندي
- Village
- Location within Iran
- Coordinates: 36°55′52″N 46°47′04″E
- Country: Iran
- Province: West Azerbaijan
- County: Baruq
- District: Nokhtalu
- Rural District: Ajorluy-ye Sharqi

Population (2016)
  - Total: 363
- Time zone: UTC+3:30 (IRST)

Hajji Kandi (Persian: حاجي كندي) (Note: Also romanized as Ḩājjī Kandī) is a village in Ajorluy-ye Sharqi Rural District of Nokhtalu District in Baruq County, West Azerbaijan province, Iran.

== Demographics ==
=== Population ===
At the time of the 2006 National Census, the village's population was 444 in 74 households, when it was in Baruq District (Note: Renamed the Central District of Baruq County) of Miandoab County. The following census in 2011 counted 334 people in 90 households. The 2016 census measured the population of the village as 363 people in 103 households.

In 2021, the district was separated from the county in the establishment of Baruq County and renamed the Central District. The rural district was transferred to the new Nokhtalu District.
