= Nader Goli =

Village in West Azerbaijan province, Iran

Nader Goli Persian: نادرگلي
- Village
- Location within Iran
- Coordinates: 36°58′38″N 46°24′39″E
- Country: Iran
- Province: West Azerbaijan
- County: Baruq
- District: Central
- Rural District: Nader Goli

Population (2016)
  - Total: 777
- Time zone: UTC+3:30 (IRST)

Nader Goli (Persian: نادرگلي) (Note: Also romanized as Nāder Golī) is a village in, and the capital of, Nader Goli Rural District in the Central District (Note: Formerly Baruq District of Miandoab County) of Baruq County, West Azerbaijan province, Iran.

== Demographics ==
=== Population ===
At the time of the 2006 National Census, the village's population was 735 in 143 households, when it was in Baruq Rural District of Baruq District (Note: Renamed the Central District of Baruq County) in Miandoab County. The following census in 2011 counted 700 people in 198 households. The 2016 census measured the population of the village as 777 people in 206 households.

In 2021, the district was separated from the county in the establishment of Baruq County and renamed the Central District. Nader Goli was transferred to Nader Goli Rural District created in the same district.
