= Mirza Nezam =

Village in West Azerbaijan province, Iran

Mirza Nezam Persian: ميرزانظام
- Village
- Location within Iran
- Coordinates: 36°53′37″N 46°15′25″E
- Country: Iran
- Province: West Azerbaijan
- County: Baruq
- District: Central
- Rural District: Baruq

Population (2016)
  - Total: 36
- Time zone: UTC+3:30 (IRST)

Mirza Nezam (Persian: ميرزانظام) (Note: Also romanized as Mīrzā Nez̧ām) is a village in Baruq Rural District of the Central District (Note: Formerly Baruq District of Miandoab County) in Baruq County, West Azerbaijan province, Iran.

== Demographics ==
=== Population ===
At the time of the 2006 National Census, the village's population was 44 in 11 households, when it was in Baruq District (Note: Renamed the Central District of Baruq County) of Miandoab County. The following census in 2011 counted 29 people in eight households. The 2016 census measured the population of the village as 36 people in 10 households.

In 2021, the district was separated from the county in the establishment of Baruq County and renamed the Central District.
