= Nowruzlu =

Nowruzlu (Persian: نوروزلو) may refer to:

- Nowruzlu, Miandoab
- Nowruzlu, Shahin Dezh
