= Varakeh Rud =

Varakeh Rud وركه رود
- Village
- Location within Iran
- Coordinates: 35°51′45″N 49°20′40″E
- Country: Iran
- Province: Qazvin
- County: Takestan
- Bakhsh: Ziaabad
- Rural District: Dodangeh-ye Sofla

Population (2006)
  - Total: 169
- Time zone: UTC+3:30 (IRST)
  - Summer (DST): UTC+4:30 (IRDT)

Varakeh Rud (Persian: وركه رود, also Romanized as Varakeh Rūd, Varakah Rūd, Varaka Rood, Varakā Rūd, Varakrūd, Varkrūd, Warakāru, and Warakārūd) is a village in Dodangeh-ye Sofla Rural District, Ziaabad District, Takestan County, Qazvin Province, Iran. At the 2006 census, its population was 169, in 48 families.
