= Atdarrahsi =

Atdarrahsi ات دره سي
- Village
- Location within Iran
- Coordinates: 36°58′23″N 46°45′55″E
- Country: Iran
- Province: West Azerbaijan
- County: Miandoab
- Bakhsh: Baruq
- Rural District: Ajorluy-ye Sharqi

Population (2006)
  - Total: 121
- Time zone: UTC+3:30 (IRST)
  - Summer (DST): UTC+4:30 (IRDT)

Atdarrahsi (Persian: ات دره سي, also Romanized as Ātdarrahsī; also known as Ātdarrasī) is a village in Ajorluy-ye Sharqi Rural District, Baruq District, Miandoab County, West Azerbaijan Province, Iran. At the 2006 census, its population was 121, in 20 families.
