= Ajorluy =

Ajorluy (Persian: آجرلوئ) may refer to:

- Ajorluy-ye Gharbi Rural District
- Ajorluy-ye Sharqi Rural District
