= Qeshlaq-e Nowruzlu =

Village in West Azerbaijan province, Iran

Qeshlaq-e Nowruzlu Persian: قشلاق نوروزلو
- Village
- Location within Iran
- Coordinates: 36°54′41″N 46°12′26″E
- Country: Iran
- Province: West Azerbaijan
- County: Baruq
- District: Central
- Rural District: Baruq

Population (2016)
  - Total: 418
- Time zone: UTC+3:30 (IRST)

Qeshlaq-e Nowruzlu (Persian: قشلاق نوروزلو) (Note: Also romanized as Qēshlāq-e Nowrūzlū) is a village in Baruq Rural District of the Central District (Note: Formerly Baruq District of Miandoab County) in Baruq County, West Azerbaijan province, Iran.

== Demographics ==
=== Population ===
At the time of the 2006 National Census, the village's population was 451 in 98 households, when it was in Baruq District (Note: Renamed the Central District of Baruq County) of Miandoab County. The following census in 2011 counted 457 people in 116 households. The 2016 census measured the population of the village as 418 people in 110 households.

In 2021, the district was separated from the county in the establishment of Baruq County and renamed the Central District.
