= Sagaznab =

Sagaznab سگزناب
- Village
- Location within Iran
- Coordinates: 35°47′16″N 49°22′21″E
- Country: Iran
- Province: Qazvin
- County: Takestan
- Bakhsh: Ziaabad
- Rural District: Dodangeh-ye Sofla

Population (2006)
  - Total: 166
- Time zone: UTC+3:30 (IRST)
  - Summer (DST): UTC+4:30 (IRDT)

Sagaznab (Persian: سگزناب, also Romanized as Sagaznāb, Sakaznāb, Sakeznāb, Sakīznāb, Sakkeznāb, and Sakznab) is a village in Dodangeh-ye Sofla Rural District, Ziaabad District, Takestan County, Qazvin Province, Iran. At the 2006 census, its population was 166, in 50 families.
