= Chali Khamaz =

Village in West Azerbaijan province, Iran

Chali Khamaz Persian: چالي خماز
- Village
- Location within Iran
- Coordinates: 36°54′15″N 46°16′31″E
- Country: Iran
- Province: West Azerbaijan
- County: Baruq
- District: Central
- Rural District: Baruq

Population (2016)
  - Total: 1,431
- Time zone: UTC+3:30 (IRST)

Chali Khamaz (Persian: چالي خماز) (Note: Also romanized as Chālī Khamāz; also known as Chākhlāmāz and Chālkhāmāz (چالخاماز)) is a village in, and the capital of, Baruq Rural District of the Central District (Note: Formerly Baruq District of Miandoab County) of Baruq County, West Azerbaijan province, Iran.

== Demographics ==
=== Population ===
At the time of the 2006 National Census, the village's population was 1,501 in 341 households, when it was in Baruq District (Note: Renamed the Central District of Baruq County) of Miandoab County. The following census in 2011 counted 1,557 people in 437 households. The 2016 census measured the population of the village as 1,431 people in 452 households.

In 2021, the district was separated from the county in the establishment of Baruq County and renamed the Central District.
