= Tak Aghaj, West Azerbaijan =

Village in West Azerbaijan province, Iran

Tak Aghaj Persian: تک‌آغاج
- Village
- Location within Iran
- Coordinates: 36°57′22″N 46°26′22″E
- Country: Iran
- Province: West Azerbaijan
- County: Baruq
- District: Nokhtalu
- Rural District: Ajorluy-ye Gharbi

Population (2016)
  - Total: 313
- Time zone: UTC+3:30 (IRST)

Tak Aghaj (Persian: تک‌آغاج) (Note: Also romanized as Tak Āghāj; also known as Tak Āqāch) is a village in Ajorluy-ye Gharbi Rural District of Nokhtalu District in Baruq County, West Azerbaijan province, Iran.

== Demographics ==
=== Population ===
At the time of the 2006 National Census, the village's population was 386 in 89 households, when it was in Baruq District (Note: Renamed the Central District of Baruq County) of Miandoab County. The following census in 2011 counted 362 people in 92 households. The 2016 census measured the population of the village as 313 people in 86 households. It was the most populous village in its rural district.

In 2021, the district was separated from the county in the establishment of Baruq County and renamed the Central District. The rural district was transferred to the new Nokhtalu District.
