= Sowghanchi =

Sowghanchi سوغانچي
- village
- Location within Iran
- Coordinates: 36°59′09″N 46°32′42″E
- Country: Iran
- Province: West Azerbaijan
- County: Miandoab
- Bakhsh: Baruq
- Rural District: Ajorluy-ye Gharbi

Population (2020)
  - Total: 100
- Time zone: UTC+3:30 (IRST)
  - Summer (DST): UTC+4:30 (IRDT)

Sowghanchi (Persian: سوغانچي, also Romanized as Sowghānchī) is a village in Ajorluy-ye Gharbi Rural District, Baruq District, Miandoab County, West Azerbaijan Province, Iran. At the 2020 census, its population was 100, in 25 families.
