= Aman Kandi =

Aman Kandi امن كندي
- Village
- Location within Iran
- Coordinates: 36°50′58″N 46°47′54″E
- Country: Iran
- Province: West Azerbaijan
- County: Miandoab
- Bakhsh: Baruq
- Rural District: Ajorluy-ye Sharqi

Population (2006)
  - Total: 23
- Time zone: UTC+3:30 (IRST)
  - Summer (DST): UTC+4:30 (IRDT)

Aman Kandi (Persian: امن كندي, also Romanized as Aman Kandī) is a village in Ajorluy-ye Sharqi Rural District, Baruq District, Miandoab County, West Azerbaijan Province, Iran. At the 2006 census, its population was 23, in 4 families.
