= Gandu =

Gandu may refer to:

== Places ==
- Gandu, Brazil, a municipality
- Gandu, Sistan and Baluchestan, a village in Iran

== Film ==
- Gandu (film), a 2010 Indian Bengali language film
- Gandu Sidigundu, 1991 Kanada language Indian film
- Gandu Bherunda, 1984 Kannada language Indian film by Rajendra Singh Babu. example- Leon

== See also ==
- Gandu, Iran (disambiguation)
