= Akhkend =

Akhkend may refer to:

- Akhkend, Armenia
- Akhkend, Iran

== See also ==
- Aqkand (disambiguation)
