= Shurjeh Baruq =

Village in West Azerbaijan province, Iran

Shurjeh Baruq Persian: شورجه باروق
- Village
- Location within Iran
- Coordinates: 36°55′13″N 46°18′41″E
- Country: Iran
- Province: West Azerbaijan
- County: Baruq
- District: Central
- Rural District: Baruq

Population (2016)
  - Total: 140
- Time zone: UTC+3:30 (IRST)

Shurjeh Baruq (Persian: شورجه باروق) (Note: Also romanized as Shūrjeh Bārūq) is a village in Baruq Rural District of the Central District (Note: Formerly Baruq District of Miandoab County) in Baruq County, West Azerbaijan province, Iran.

== Demographics ==
=== Population ===
At the time of the 2006 National Census, the village's population was 210 in 41 households, when it was in Baruq District (Note: Renamed the Central District of Baruq County) of Miandoab County. The following census in 2011 counted 192 people in 51 households. The 2016 census measured the population of the village as 140 people in 41 households.

In 2021, the district was separated from the county in the establishment of Baruq County and renamed the Central District.
