= Ali Yar Kandi =

Village in West Azerbaijan province, Iran

Ali Yar Kandi Persian: علي ياركندي
- Village
- Location within Iran
- Coordinates: 36°55′30″N 46°14′12″E
- Country: Iran
- Province: West Azerbaijan
- County: Baruq
- District: Central
- Rural District: Baruq

Population (2016)
  - Total: 378
- Time zone: UTC+3:30 (IRST)

Ali Yar Kandi (Persian: علي ياركندي) (Note: Also romanized as ʿAlī Yār Kandī; also known as ‘Olīār Kandī) is a village in Baruq Rural District of the Central District (Note: Formerly Baruq District of Miandoab County) in Baruq County, West Azerbaijan province, Iran.

== Demographics ==
=== Population ===
At the time of the 2006 National Census, the village's population was 338 in 74 households, when it was in Baruq District (Note: Renamed the Central District of Baruq County) of Miandoab County. The following census in 2011 counted 354 people in 95 households. The 2016 census measured the population of the village as 378 people in 113 households.

In 2021, the district was separated from the county in the establishment of Baruq County and renamed the Central District.
