= Chakher Ahmad =

Chakher Ahmad چاخراحمد
- Village
- Location within Iran
- Coordinates: 36°55′38″N 46°30′03″E
- Country: Iran
- Province: West Azerbaijan
- County: Miandoab
- Bakhsh: Baruq
- Rural District: Ajorluy-ye Gharbi

Population (2006)
  - Total: 181
- Time zone: UTC+3:30 (IRST)
  - Summer (DST): UTC+4:30 (IRDT)

Chakher Ahmad (Persian: چاخراحمد, also Romanized as Chākher Aḩmad; also known as Chāqer Aḩmad) is a village in Ajorluy-ye Gharbi Rural District, Baruq District, Miandoab County, West Azerbaijan Province, Iran. At the 2006 census, its population was 181, in 45 families.
