= Petaklu =

Petaklu پتك لو
- Village
- Location within Iran
- Coordinates: 36°58′13″N 46°43′25″E
- Country: Iran
- Province: West Azerbaijan
- County: Miandoab
- Bakhsh: Baruq
- Rural District: Ajorluy-ye Sharqi

Population (2006)
  - Total: 60
- Time zone: UTC+3:30 (IRST)
  - Summer (DST): UTC+4:30 (IRDT)

Petaklu (Persian: پتك لو, also Romanized as Petaklū) is a village in Ajorluy-ye Sharqi Rural District, Baruq District, Miandoab County, West Azerbaijan Province, Iran. At the 2006 census, its population was 60, in 12 families.
