= Mameh Kandi =

Mameh Kandi ممه كندي
- Village
- Location within Iran
- Coordinates: 36°58′04″N 46°37′52″E
- Country: Iran
- Province: West Azerbaijan
- County: Miandoab
- Bakhsh: Baruq
- Rural District: Ajorluy-ye Sharqi

Population (2006)
  - Total: 81
- Time zone: UTC+3:30 (IRST)
  - Summer (DST): UTC+4:30 (IRDT)

Mameh Kandi (Persian: ممه كندي, also Romanized as Mameh Kandī; also known as Ma‘eh Kandī) is a village in Ajorluy-ye Sharqi Rural District, Baruq District, Miandoab County, West Azerbaijan Province, Iran.

== History ==
At the 2006 census, its population was 81, in 16 families.
