= Yalaklu =

Yalaklu يلكلو
- Village
- Location within Iran
- Coordinates: 36°55′10″N 46°32′30″E
- Country: Iran
- Province: West Azerbaijan
- County: Miandoab
- Bakhsh: Baruq
- Rural District: Ajorluy-ye Gharbi

Population (2006)
  - Total: 175
- Time zone: UTC+3:30 (IRST)
  - Summer (DST): UTC+4:30 (IRDT)

Yalaklu (Persian: يلكلو, also Romanized as Yalaklū) is a village in Ajorluy-ye Gharbi Rural District, Baruq District, Miandoab County, West Azerbaijan Province, Iran. At the 2006 census, its population was 175, in 36 families.
