= Aydisheh =

Village in West Azerbaijan province, Iran

Aydisheh Persian: ايديشه
- Village
- Location within Iran
- Coordinates: 36°53′09″N 46°16′40″E
- Country: Iran
- Province: West Azerbaijan
- County: Baruq
- District: Central
- Rural District: Baruq

Population (2016)
  - Total: 725
- Time zone: UTC+3:30 (IRST)

Aydisheh (Persian: ايديشه) (Note: Also romanized as Āydīsheh) is a village in Baruq Rural District of the Central District (Note: Formerly Baruq District of Miandoab County) in Baruq County, West Azerbaijan province, Iran.

== Demographics ==
=== Population ===
At the time of the 2006 National Census, the village's population was 831 in 185 households, when it was in Baruq District (Note: Renamed the Central District of Baruq County) of Miandoab County. The following census in 2011 counted 873 people in 266 households. The 2016 census measured the population of the village as 725 people in 210 households.

In 2021, the district was separated from the county in the establishment of Baruq County and renamed the Central District.
