= Gowzluy =

Gowzluy (Persian: گوزللوي), also rendered as Gowzlu may refer to:

- Gowzluy-e Olya
- Gowzluy-e Sofla
