= Gol Soleymanabad =

Village in West Azerbaijan province, Iran

Gol Soleymanabad Persian: گل سليمان اباد
- Village
- Location within Iran
- Coordinates: 36°57′03″N 46°15′12″E
- Country: Iran
- Province: West Azerbaijan
- County: Baruq
- District: Central
- Rural District: Baruq

Population (2016)
  - Total: 3,436
- Time zone: UTC+3:30 (IRST)

Gol Soleymanabad (Persian: گل سليمان اباد) (Note: Also romanized as Gol Soleymānābād) is a village in Baruq Rural District of the Central District (Note: Formerly Baruq District of Miandoab County) in Baruq County, West Azerbaijan province, Iran.

== Demographics ==
=== Population ===
At the time of the 2006 National Census, the village's population was 2,923 in 699 households, when it was in Baruq District (Note: Renamed the Central District of Baruq County) of Miandoab County. The following census in 2011 counted 3,333 people in 937 households. The 2016 census measured the population of the village as 3,436 people in 1,008 households. It was the most populous village in its rural district.

In 2021, the district was separated from the county in the establishment of Baruq County and renamed the Central District.
