= Yeli Bolagh =

Yeli Bolagh يلي بلاغ
- Village
- Location within Iran
- Coordinates: 37°00′20″N 46°30′30″E
- Country: Iran
- Province: West Azerbaijan
- County: Miandoab
- Bakhsh: Baruq
- Rural District: Ajorluy-ye Gharbi

Population (2006)
  - Total: 19
- Time zone: UTC+3:30 (IRST)
  - Summer (DST): UTC+4:30 (IRDT)

Yeli Bolagh (Persian: يلي بلاغ, also Romanized as Yelī Bolāgh) is a village in Ajorluy-ye Gharbi Rural District, Baruq District, Miandoab County, West Azerbaijan Province, Iran. At the 2006 census, its population was 19, in 4 families.
