= Jabiglu =

Jabaklu جبک لو
- Village
- Location within Iran
- Coordinates: 36°55′05″N 46°34′57″E
- Country: Iran
- Province: West Azerbaijan
- County: Miandoab
- Bakhsh: Baruq
- Rural District: Ajorluy-ye Gharbi

Population (2006)
  - Total: 42
- Time zone: UTC+3:30 (IRST)
  - Summer (DST): UTC+4:30 (IRDT)

Jabiglu (Persian: جبک لو, also Romanized as Jabaklū; also known as Jabīklū) is a village in Ajorluy-ye Gharbi Rural District, Baruq District, Miandoab County, West Azerbaijan Province, Iran. At the 2006 census, its population was 42, in 10 families.
