= Urta Daraq =

Urta Daraq اورتادرق
- Village
- Location within Iran
- Coordinates: 37°01′55″N 46°43′37″E
- Country: Iran
- Province: West Azerbaijan
- County: Miandoab
- Bakhsh: Baruq
- Rural District: Ajorluy-ye Sharqi

Population (2006)
  - Total: 136
- Time zone: UTC+3:30 (IRST)
  - Summer (DST): UTC+4:30 (IRDT)

Urta Daraq (Persian: اورتادرق, also Romanized as Ūrtā Daraq) is a village in Ajorluy-ye Sharqi Rural District, Baruq District, Miandoab County, West Azerbaijan Province, Iran. At the 2006 census, its population was 136, in 27 families.
