= Aq Kandi =

Aq Kandi (Persian: اق كندي) may refer to:

- Aq Kandi, East Azerbaijan
- Aq Kandi, Zanjan
