= Guy Kharabeh =

Guy Kharabeh گوي خرابه
- Village
- Location within Iran
- Coordinates: 36°55′49″N 46°40′57″E
- Country: Iran
- Province: West Azerbaijan
- County: Miandoab
- Bakhsh: Baruq
- Rural District: Ajorluy-ye Sharqi

Population (2006)
  - Total: 111
- Time zone: UTC+3:30 (IRST)
  - Summer (DST): UTC+4:30 (IRDT)

Guy Kharabeh (Persian: گوي خرابه, also Romanized as Gūy Kharābeh) is a village in Ajorluy-ye Sharqi Rural District, Baruq District, Miandoab County, West Azerbaijan Province, Iran. At the 2006 census, its population was 111, in 23 families.
