= Qareh Bughaz =

Qareh Bughaz قره بوغاز
- Village
- Location within Iran
- Coordinates: 37°01′39″N 46°35′16″E
- Country: Iran
- Province: West Azerbaijan
- County: Miandoab
- Bakhsh: Baruq
- Rural District: Ajorluy-ye Gharbi

Population (2006)
  - Total: 29
- Time zone: UTC+3:30 (IRST)
  - Summer (DST): UTC+4:30 (IRDT)

Qareh Bughaz (Persian: قره بوغاز, also Romanized as Qareh Būghāz; also known as Qarah Būghār) is a village in Ajorluy-ye Gharbi Rural District, Baruq District, Miandoab County, West Azerbaijan Province, Iran. At the 2006 census, its population was 29, in 5 families.
