= Nohab, Iran =

Village in Qazvin province, Iran

Nohab Persian: نهب
- Village
- Location within Iran
- Coordinates: 35°50′32″N 49°27′03″E
- Country: Iran
- Province: Qazvin
- County: Takestan
- District: Ziaabad
- Rural District: Dodangeh-ye Sofla

Population (2016)
  - Total: 390
- Time zone: UTC+3:30 (IRST)

Nohab (Persian: نهب) (Note: Also romanized as Nahob and Nohob; also known as Nūhūm) is a village in Dodangeh-ye Sofla Rural District of Ziaabad District, Takestan County, Qazvin province, Iran.

== Demographics ==
=== Population ===
At the time of the 2006 National Census, the village's population was 341 in 105 households. The following census in 2011 counted 327 people in 111 households. The 2016 census measured the population of the village as 390 people in 105 households.
