= Shakin =

Village in Qazvin province, Iran

Shakin Persian: شاكين
- Village
- Location within Iran
- Coordinates: 35°52′40″N 49°21′28″E
- Country: Iran
- Province: Qazvin
- County: Takestan
- District: Ziaabad
- Rural District: Dodangeh-ye Sofla

Population (2016)
  - Total: 247
- Time zone: UTC+3:30 (IRST)

Shakin (Persian: شاكين) (Note: Also romanized as Shākīn) is a village in Dodangeh-ye Sofla Rural District of Ziaabad District, Takestan County, Qazvin province, Iran.

== Demographics ==
=== Population ===
At the time of the 2006 National Census, the village's population was 423 in 127 households. The following census in 2011 counted 317 people in 108 households. The 2016 census measured the population of the village as 247 people in 93 households.
