= Chuzah, Qazvin =

Village in Qazvin province, Iran

Chuzah Persian: چوزه
- Village
- Location within Iran
- Coordinates: 35°50′49″N 49°15′01″E
- Country: Iran
- Province: Qazvin
- County: Takestan
- District: Ziaabad
- Rural District: Dodangeh-ye Sofla

Population (2016)
  - Total: 1,291
- Time zone: UTC+3:30 (IRST)

Chuzah (Persian: چوزه) (Note: Also romanized as Choozeh, Chowzeh, Chūzah, and Chūzeh; also known as Chūza) is a village in Dodangeh-ye Sofla Rural District of Ziaabad District, Takestan County, Qazvin province, Iran.

== Demographics ==
=== Ethnicity ===
The village is populated by Azerbaijani Turks.

=== Population ===
At the time of the 2006 National Census, the village's population was 1,265 in 298 households. The following census in 2011 counted 1,360 people in 383 households. The 2016 census measured the population of the village as 1,291 people in 385 households. It was the most populous village in its rural district.
