= Jarandaq =

Village in Qazvin province, Iran

Jarandaq Persian: جرندق
- Village
- Location within Iran
- Coordinates: 36°06′51″N 49°28′49″E
- Country: Iran
- Province: Qazvin
- County: Takestan
- District: Ziaabad
- Rural District: Dodangeh-ye Olya

Population (2016)
  - Total: 289
- Time zone: UTC+3:30 (IRST)

Jarandaq (Persian: جرندق) (Note: Also known as Charandak, Charandan, and Garandeh) is a village in Dodangeh-ye Olya Rural District of Ziaabad District in Takestan County, Qazvin province, Iran.

== Demographics ==
=== Population ===
At the time of the 2006 National Census, the village's population was 449 in 117 households. The following census in 2011 counted 352 people in 104 households. The 2016 census measured the population of the village as 289 people in 95 households.
