= Gowzluy-e Olya =

Gowzluy-e Olya گوزللوي عليا
- Village
- Location within Iran
- Coordinates: 36°58′25″N 46°28′49″E
- Country: Iran
- Province: West Azerbaijan
- County: Miandoab
- Bakhsh: Baruq
- Rural District: Ajorluy-ye Gharbi

Population (2006)
  - Total: 104
- Time zone: UTC+3:30 (IRST)
  - Summer (DST): UTC+4:30 (IRDT)

Gowzluy-e Olya (Persian: گوزللوي عليا, also Romanized as Gowzlūy-e ‘Olyā; also known as Gowzlū-ye ‘Olyā) is a village in Ajorluy-ye Gharbi Rural District, Baruq District, Miandoab County, West Azerbaijan Province, Iran. At the 2006 census, its population was 104, in 21 families.
