= Qaracheh Qia =

Village in Qazvin province, Iran

Qaracheh Qia Persian: قراچه قيا
- Village
- Location within Iran
- Coordinates: 35°56′07″N 49°12′34″E
- Country: Iran
- Province: Qazvin
- County: Takestan
- District: Ziaabad
- Rural District: Dodangeh-ye Olya

Population (2016)
  - Total: 256
- Time zone: UTC+3:30 (IRST)

Qaracheh Qia (Persian: قراچه قيا) (Note: Also romanized as Qarācheh Qīā; also known as Gharacheh Ghiya, Qara Jāghīa, Qarah Jāqiah, Qarājeh Qabā, Qarājeh Qeyā, and Qarājeh Qīā) is a village in Dodangeh-ye Olya Rural District of Ziaabad District in Takestan County, Qazvin province, Iran.

== Demographics ==
=== Population ===
At the time of the 2006 National Census, the village's population was 277 in 68 households. The following census in 2011 counted 188 people in 54 households. The 2016 census measured the population of the village as 256 people in 67 households.
