= Azaddeh, Qazvin =

Village in Qazvin province, Iran

Azaddeh Persian: ازادده
- Village
- Location within Iran
- Coordinates: 35°52′07″N 49°13′38″E
- Country: Iran
- Province: Qazvin
- County: Takestan
- District: Ziaabad
- Rural District: Dodangeh-ye Sofla

Population (2016)
  - Total: 713
- Time zone: UTC+3:30 (IRST)

Azaddeh (Persian: ازادده) (Note: Also romanized as Āzāddeh) is a village in Dodangeh-ye Sofla Rural District of Ziaabad District, Takestan County, Qazvin province, Iran.

== Demographics ==
=== Population ===
At the time of the 2006 National Census, the village's population was 687 in 176 households. The following census in 2011 counted 704 people in 226 households. The 2016 census measured the population of the village as 713 people in 224 households.
