= Kandu, Iran =

Kandu (Persian: كندو) may refer to:

- Kandu, Hamadan
- Kandu, Qazvin

== See also ==
- Gandu, Iran (disambiguation)
