= Mehin, Qazvin =

Village in Qazvin province, Iran

Mehin Persian: مهين
- Village
- Location within Iran
- Coordinates: 36°08′33″N 49°28′22″E
- Country: Iran
- Province: Qazvin
- County: Takestan
- District: Ziaabad
- Rural District: Dodangeh-ye Olya

Population (2016)
  - Total: 301
- Time zone: UTC+3:30 (IRST)

Mehin (Persian: مهين) (Note: Also romanized as Mahīn and Mehīn; also known as Mīhan, Mihīn, and Mikhin) is a village in Dodangeh-ye Olya Rural District of Ziaabad District in Takestan County, Qazvin province, Iran.

== Demographics ==
=== Population ===
At the time of the 2006 National Census, the village's population was 499 in 130 households. The following census in 2011 counted 365 people in 110 households. The 2016 census measured the population of the village as 301 people in 97 households.
