= Tuyuqchi =

Village in Qazvin province, Iran

Tuyuqchi Persian: طويوقچي
- Village
- Location within Iran
- Coordinates: 36°02′25″N 49°26′07″E
- Country: Iran
- Province: Qazvin
- County: Takestan
- District: Ziaabad
- Rural District: Dodangeh-ye Olya

Population (2016)
  - Total: 795
- Time zone: UTC+3:30 (IRST)

Tuyuqchi (Persian: طويوقچي) (Note: Also romanized as Ţūyūqchī; also known as Ţopoqchī) is a village in Dodangeh-ye Olya Rural District of Ziaabad District in Takestan County, Qazvin province, Iran.

== Demographics ==
=== Population ===
At the time of the 2006 National Census, the village's population was 791 in 211 households. The following census in 2011 counted 811 people in 238 households. The 2016 census measured the population of the village as 795 people in 252 households.
