= Qaleh Juq, Qazvin =

Village in Qazvin province, Iran

Qaleh Juq Persian: قلعه جوق
- Village
- Location within Iran
- Coordinates: 35°57′01″N 49°17′39″E
- Country: Iran
- Province: Qazvin
- County: Takestan
- District: Ziaabad
- Rural District: Dodangeh-ye Olya

Population (2016)
  - Total: 229
- Time zone: UTC+3:30 (IRST)

Qaleh Juq (Persian: قلعه جوق) (Note: Also romanized as Qal‘eh Jūq and Qal‘eh-ye Jūq; also known as Ghal’eh Joogh, Qal‘eh Jaq, and Qal‘eh Jokh) is a village in Dodangeh-ye Olya Rural District of Ziaabad District in Takestan County, Qazvin province, Iran.

== Demographics ==
=== Population ===
At the time of the 2006 National Census, the village's population was 383 in 78 households. The following census in 2011 counted 289 people in 81 households. The 2016 census measured the population of the village as 229 people in 73 households.
