= Kainar =

Kainar may refer to:

- 14056 Kainar, an asteroid
- Kainar, Iran, a village
