= Aq Kand-e Baruq =

Village in West Azerbaijan province, Iran

Aq Kand-e Baruq Persian: اقكندباروق
- Village
- Location within Iran
- Coordinates: 36°55′18″N 46°18′09″E
- Country: Iran
- Province: West Azerbaijan
- County: Baruq
- District: Central
- Rural District: Baruq

Population (2016)
  - Total: 492
- Time zone: UTC+3:30 (IRST)

Aq Kand-e Baruq (Persian: اقكندباروق) (Note: Also romanized as Āq Kand-e Bārūq) is a village in Baruq Rural District of the Central District (Note: Formerly Baruq District of Miandoab County) in Baruq County, West Azerbaijan province, Iran.

== Demographics ==
=== Population ===
At the time of the 2006 National Census, the village's population was 460 in 95 households, when it was in Baruq District (Note: Renamed the Central District of Baruq County) of Miandoab County. The following census in 2011 counted 473 people in 138 households. The 2016 census measured the population of the village as 492 people in 143 households.

In 2021, the district was separated from the county in the establishment of Baruq County and renamed the Central District.
