= Arbat Darreh =

Arbat Darreh اربطدره
- Village
- Location within Iran
- Coordinates: 36°09′04″N 49°31′01″E
- Country: Iran
- Province: Qazvin
- County: Takestan
- Bakhsh: Ziaabad
- Rural District: Dodangeh-ye Olya

Population (2006)
  - Total: 12
- Time zone: UTC+3:30 (IRST)
  - Summer (DST): UTC+4:30 (IRDT)

Arbat Darreh (Persian: اربطدره, also Romanized as Arbaţ Darreh; also known as Ārpā Darreh, Arbat, and Ārpdareh) is a village in Dodangeh-ye Olya Rural District, Ziaabad District, Takestan County, Qazvin Province, Iran. At the 2006 census, its population was 12, in 4 families.
