= Tak Aghaj =

Tak Aghaj (Persian: تک‌آغاج) may refer to:

- Tak Aghaj, West Azerbaijan
- Tak Aghaj, Zanjan
