= Qeynarjeh, Qazvin =

Qeynarjeh قينرجه
- Village
- Location within Iran
- Coordinates: 35°55′48″N 49°16′17″E
- Country: Iran
- Province: Qazvin
- County: Takestan
- Bakhsh: Ziaabad
- Rural District: Dodangeh-ye Olya

Population (2006)
  - Total: 108
- Time zone: UTC+3:30 (IRST)
  - Summer (DST): UTC+4:30 (IRDT)

Qeynarjeh (Persian: قينرجه, also Romanized as Qeynarjah, Qīnarjeh, and Qainarjeh; also known as Qeynar, Kainar, Qainar, and Ghanbarcheh) is a village in Dodangeh-ye Olya Rural District, Ziaabad District, Takestan County, Qazvin Province, Iran. At the 2006 census, its population was 108, in 22 families.
