= Khondab, Qazvin =

Khondab خنداب
- Village
- Location within Iran
- Coordinates: 35°54′11″N 49°22′59″E
- Country: Iran
- Province: Qazvin
- County: Takestan
- Bakhsh: Ziaabad
- Rural District: Dodangeh-ye Olya

Population (2006)
  - Total: 123
- Time zone: UTC+3:30 (IRST)
  - Summer (DST): UTC+4:30 (IRDT)

Khondab (Persian: خنداب, also Romanized as Khondāb, Khandāb, and Khendāb; also known as Kandu) is a village in Dodangeh-ye Olya Rural District, Ziaabad District, Takestan County, Qazvin Province, Iran. At the 2006 census, its population was 123, in 34 families.
