= Shur, Iran =

Shur, Iran may refer to:

- Shur, Qazvin
- Shur, Tehran
