= Farsajin, Qazvin =

Village in Qazvin province, Iran

Farsajin Persian: فارسجين
- Village
- Location within Iran
- Coordinates: 36°01′42″N 49°25′30″E
- Country: Iran
- Province: Qazvin
- County: Takestan
- District: Ziaabad
- Rural District: Dodangeh-ye Olya

Population (2016)
  - Total: 1,860
- Time zone: UTC+3:30 (IRST)

Farsajin (Persian: فارسجين) (Note: Also romanized as Fārsajīn, Fārsejīn, and Fārsjīn; also known as Farsagin, Fārsījīn, and Parsadzhin) is a village in, and the capital of, Dodangeh-ye Olya Rural District in Ziaabad District of Takestan County, Qazvin province, Iran. The previous capital of the rural district was the village of Ziaabad, now a city.

== Demographics ==
=== Population ===
At the time of the 2006 National Census, the village's population was 1,849 in 575 households. The following census in 2011 counted 1,312 people in 461 households. The 2016 census measured the population of the village as 1,860 people in 626 households. It was the most populous village in its rural district.

== In literature ==
The 14th-century author Hamdallah Mustawfi listed Farsajin (as Fārisjīn) as one of the main villages in the territory of Qazvin.
