= Nowruzlu, Baruq =

Village in West Azerbaijan province, Iran

Nowruzlu Persian: نوروزلو
- Village
- Location within Iran
- Coordinates: 36°54′11″N 46°13′44″E
- Country: Iran
- Province: West Azerbaijan
- County: Baruq
- District: Central
- Rural District: Baruq

Population (2016)
  - Total: 742
- Time zone: UTC+3:30 (IRST)

Nowruzlu (Persian: نوروزلو (Note: Also romanized as Nowrūzlū) is a village in Baruq Rural District of the Central District (Note: Formerly Baruq District of Miandoab County) in Baruq County, West Azerbaijan province, Iran.

== Demographics ==
=== Population ===
At the time of the 2006 National Census, the village's population was 678 in 136 households, when it was in Baruq District (Note: Renamed the Central District of Baruq County) of Miandoab County. The following census in 2011 counted 779 people in 229 households. The 2016 census measured the population of the village as 742 people in 221 households.

In 2021, the district was separated from the county in the establishment of Baruq County and renamed the Central District.
