= Qermezabad =

Village in Qazvin province, Iran

Qermezabad Persian: قرمزاباد
- Village
- Location within Iran
- Coordinates: 35°54′06″N 49°14′56″E
- Country: Iran
- Province: Qazvin
- County: Takestan
- District: Ziaabad
- Rural District: Dodangeh-ye Sofla

Population (2016)
  - Total: 634
- Time zone: UTC+3:30 (IRST)

Qermezabad in the spring

Qermezabad (Persian: قرمزاباد) (Note: Also romanized as Qermezābād; also known as Ghermez Abad, Kirmizābād, and Qirmizābād) is a village in Dodangeh-ye Sofla Rural District of Ziaabad District, Takestan County, Qazvin province, Iran.

== Demographics ==
=== Population ===
At the time of the 2006 National Census, the village's population was 677 in 158 households. The following census in 2011 counted 680 people in 172 households. The 2016 census measured the population of the village as 634 people in 187 households.
