= Gowzluy-e Sofla =

Gowzluy-e Sofla گوزللوي سفلي
- Village
- Location within Iran
- Coordinates: 36°56′54″N 46°28′44″E
- Country: Iran
- Province: West Azerbaijan
- County: Miandoab
- Bakhsh: Baruq
- Rural District: Ajorluy-ye Gharbi

Population (2006)
  - Total: 49
- Time zone: UTC+3:30 (IRST)
  - Summer (DST): UTC+4:30 (IRDT)

Gowzluy-e Sofla (Persian: گوزللوي سفلي, also Romanized as Gowzlūy-e Soflá; also known as Gowzlū-ye Soflá) is a village in Ajorluy-ye Gharbi Rural District, Baruq District, Miandoab County, West Azerbaijan Province, Iran. At the 2006 census, its population was 49, in 10 families.
