= Arunqash =

Village in Qazvin province, Iran

Arunqash Persian: ارونقاش
- Village
- Location within Iran
- Coordinates: 35°54′03″N 49°16′38″E
- Country: Iran
- Province: Qazvin
- County: Takestan
- District: Ziaabad
- Rural District: Dodangeh-ye Sofla

Population (2016)
  - Total: 312
- Time zone: UTC+3:30 (IRST)

Arunqash (Persian: ارونقاش) (Note: Also romanized as Arūnqāsh, Owranqāsh, and Ūranqāsh; also known as Oroonghash and Urungāsh) is a village in Dodangeh-ye Sofla Rural District of Ziaabad District, Takestan County, Qazvin province, Iran.

== Demographics ==
=== Population ===
At the time of the 2006 National Census, the village's population was 444 in 91 households. The following census in 2011 counted 323 people in 95 households. The 2016 census measured the population of the village as 312 people in 100 households.
