= Arbatan =

Arbatan may refer to:

- Arbatan, Nakhchivan, Azerbaijan
- Arbatan, Salyan, Azerbaijan
- Arbatan, Iran (disambiguation)
