= Arbat-e Olya =

Arbat-e Olya اربطعليا
- Village
- Location within Iran
- Coordinates: 37°04′00″N 46°42′30″E
- Country: Iran
- Province: West Azerbaijan
- County: Miandoab
- Bakhsh: Baruq
- Rural District: Ajorluy-ye Sharqi

Population (2006)
  - Total: 144
- Time zone: UTC+3:30 (IRST)
  - Summer (DST): UTC+4:30 (IRDT)

Arbat-e Olya (Persian: اربطعليا, also Romanized as Arbaţ-e ‘Olyā and Arbaţ ‘Olyā) is a village in Ajorluy-ye Sharqi Rural District, Baruq District, Miandoab County, West Azerbaijan Province, Iran. At the 2006 census, its population was 144, in 25 families.
