= Shazar =

Shazar may refer to:

- Shazar, Iran, a village in Qazvin Province, Iran
- Pal Shazar, American singer and songwriter
- Rachel Katznelson-Shazar (1885–1975), wife of Zalman Shazar
- Zalman Shazar (1889–1974), Israeli politician, author, and poet (3rd President of Israel)
