= Hesar, Takestan =

Village in Qazvin province, Iran

Hesar Persian: حصار
- Village
- Location within Iran
- Coordinates: 35°49′11″N 49°24′19″E
- Country: Iran
- Province: Qazvin
- County: Takestan
- District: Ziaabad
- Rural District: Dodangeh-ye Sofla

Population (2016)
  - Total: 288
- Time zone: UTC+3:30 (IRST)

Hesar (Persian: حصار) (Note: Also romanized as Ḩeşār) is a village in Dodangeh-ye Sofla Rural District of Ziaabad District, Takestan County, Qazvin province, Iran.

== Demographics ==
=== Population ===
At the time of the 2006 National Census, the village's population was 388 in 104 households. The following census in 2011 counted 344 people in 107 households. The 2016 census measured the population of the village as 288 people in 99 households.
