= Arbat-e Sofla =

Arbat-e Sofla اربطسفلي
- Village
- Location within Iran
- Coordinates: 37°02′31″N 46°42′09″E
- Country: Iran
- Province: West Azerbaijan
- County: Miandoab
- Bakhsh: Baruq
- Rural District: Ajorluy-ye Sharqi

Population (2006)
  - Total: 188
- Time zone: UTC+3:30 (IRST)
  - Summer (DST): UTC+4:30 (IRDT)

Arbat-e Sofla (Persian: اربطسفلي, also Romanized as Arbaţ-e Soflá) is a village in Ajorluy-ye Sharqi Rural District, Baruq District, Miandoab County, West Azerbaijan Province, Iran. At the 2006 census, its population was 188, in 37 families.
