= Shurjeh, Qazvin =

Shurjeh شورجه
- Village
- Location within Iran
- Coordinates: 36°06′16″N 49°26′36″E
- Country: Iran
- Province: Qazvin
- County: Takestan
- Bakhsh: Ziaabad
- Rural District: Dodangeh-ye Olya

Population (2006)
  - Total: 73
- Time zone: UTC+3:30 (IRST)
  - Summer (DST): UTC+4:30 (IRDT)

Shurjeh (Persian: شورجه, also Romanized as Shūrjeh; also known as Shūr) is a village in Dodangeh-ye Olya Rural District, Ziaabad District, Takestan County, Qazvin Province, Iran. At the 2006 census, its population was 73, in 21 families.
