= Hoseynabad, Takestan =

Village in Qazvin province, Iran

Hoseynabad Persian: حسين اباد
- Village
- Location within Iran
- Coordinates: 35°50′32″N 49°24′05″E
- Country: Iran
- Province: Qazvin
- County: Takestan
- District: Ziaabad
- Rural District: Dodangeh-ye Sofla

Population (2016)
  - Total: 252
- Time zone: UTC+3:30 (IRST)

Hoseynabad (Persian: حسين اباد) (Note: Also romanized as Ḩoseynābād; also known as Hosein Abad Dodangeh and Husainābād) is a village in, and the capital of, Dodangeh-ye Sofla Rural District in Ziaabad District of Takestan County, Qazvin province, Iran.

== Demographics ==
=== Population ===
At the time of the 2006 National Census, the village's population was 411 in 97 households. The following census in 2011 counted 319 people in 90 households. The 2016 census measured the population of the village as 252 people in 89 households.
