= Avarneh =

Village in Qazvin province, Iran

Avarneh Persian: اورنه
- Village
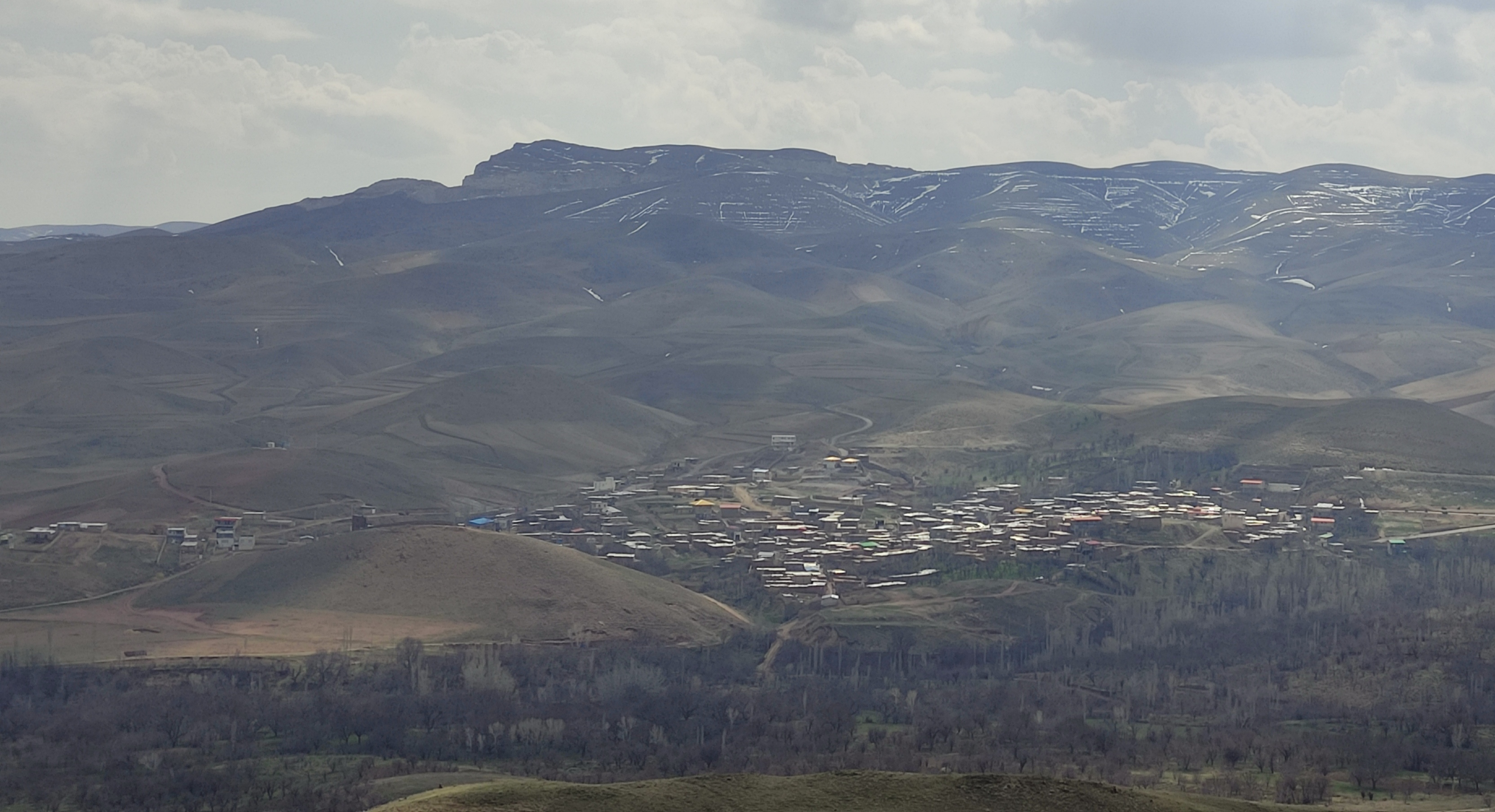

- Location within Iran
- Coordinates: 35°57′04″N 49°15′37″E
- Country: Iran
- Province: Qazvin
- County: Takestan
- District: Ziaabad
- Rural District: Dodangeh-ye Olya

Population (2016)
  - Total: 476
- Time zone: UTC+3:30 (IRST)

Avarneh (Persian: اورنه) (Note: Also romanized as Awarneh, Oorneh, Owraneh, Ūraneh, and Ūrneh; also known as Abarnaū and Owrūneh) is a village in Dodangeh-ye Olya Rural District of Ziaabad District in Takestan County, Qazvin province, Iran.

== Demographics ==
=== Population ===
At the time of the 2006 National Census, the village's population was 764 in 179 households. The following census in 2011 counted 517 people in 155 households. The 2016 census measured the population of the village as 476 people in 144 households.
