= Saj =

Saj may refer to:

- Saj (bread)
- Saj (utensil)
- Saj', Arabic literary genre
- Saj, Iran, a village in Qazvin Province
- Saj, the tree Terminalia elliptica
- Saj (Coronation Street), TV character
- Sahu language, ISO 639-3 language code

SAJ may refer to:

- Scout Association of Japan
- Sir Anerood Jugnauth, former President and PM of Mauritius
- Society for the Advancement of Judaism, a Reconstructionist synagogue in New York City
- Special Anti-Terrorist Unit (Serbia) (Serbian: Specijalna Antiteroristička Jedinica)
- St Johns railway station, London, England, National Rail station code
- Finnish Trade Union Federation (Suomen Ammattijärjestö)
  - Finnish Trade Union Federation (1960)
