= Shanin, Qazvin =

Village in Qazvin province, Iran

Shanin Persian: شنين
- Village
- Location within Iran
- Coordinates: 35°57′51″N 49°19′40″E
- Country: Iran
- Province: Qazvin
- County: Takestan
- District: Ziaabad
- Rural District: Dodangeh-ye Olya

Population (2016)
  - Total: 306
- Time zone: UTC+3:30 (IRST)

Shanin (Persian: شنين) (Note: Also romanized as Shanīn and Shenīn; also known as Shanī’īn, Shanin Dodangeh, Shīnīyīn, and Shīrīn) is a village in Dodangeh-ye Olya Rural District of Ziaabad District in Takestan County, Qazvin province, Iran.

== Demographics ==
=== Population ===
At the time of the 2006 National Census, the village's population was 301 in 88 households. The following census in 2011 counted 242 people in 78 households. The 2016 census measured the population of the village as 306 people in 101 households.
