= Hoseynabad-e Jarandaq =

Village in Qazvin province, Iran

Hoseynabad-e Jarandaq Persian: حسين اباد جرندق
- Village
- Location within Iran
- Coordinates: 36°04′16″N 49°28′42″E
- Country: Iran
- Province: Qazvin
- County: Takestan
- District: Ziaabad
- Rural District: Dodangeh-ye Olya

Population (2016)
  - Total: 116
- Time zone: UTC+3:30 (IRST)

Hoseynabad-e Jarandaq (Persian: حسين ابادجرندق) (Note: Also romanized as Ḩoseynābād Jarandaq and Ḩoseynābād-e Jarandaq; also known as Guseynabad, Ḩoseynābād, Ḩoseynābād-e Do Dāngeh, and Husainābād) is a village in Dodangeh-ye Olya Rural District of Ziaabad District in Takestan County, Qazvin province, Iran.

== Demographics ==
=== Population ===
At the time of the 2006 National Census, the village's population was 181 in 57 households. The following census in 2011 counted 256 people in 91 households. The 2016 census measured the population of the village as 116 people in 47 households.
