= Seyyed Mohammad Ziaabadi =

Iranian Ayatollah (1928–2021)

Ayatollah Seyyed Mohammad Ziaabadi
- سید محمد ضیاءآبادی
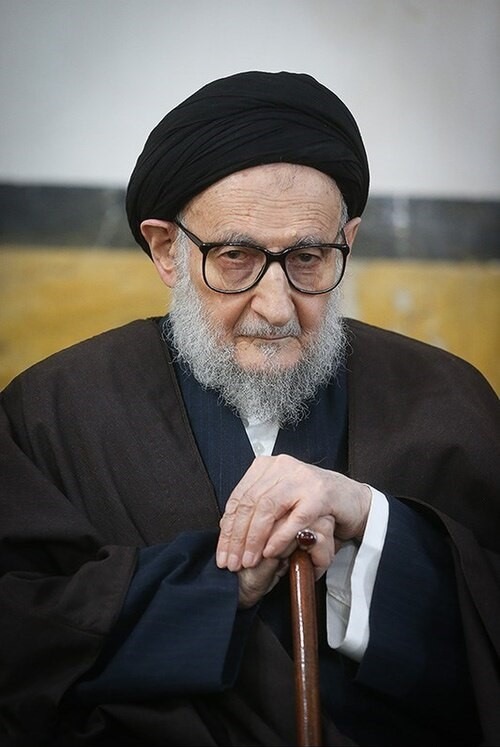
- Ziaabadi in 2017
- Title: Ayatollah

Personal life
- Born: 1928 Ziaabad, Qazvin Province, Imperial State Iran.
- Died: 8 February 2021 (aged 92–93) Tehran, Iran
- Resting place: Shah Abdol-Azim Shrine; 35°35′08″N 51°26′07″E

Religious life
- Religion: Islam
- Jurisprudence: Twelver Shia Islam

Muslim leader
- Teacher: Hossein Borujerdi, Ruhollah Khomeini, Muhammad Husayn Tabatabai

Ayatollah Seyyed Mohammad Ziaabadi (1928 – 8 February 2021) (Persian: سید محمد ضیاءآبادی) was an Iranian Mujtahid that was based in the Tehran Islamic Seminary. He specialised in Islamic ethics and interpretation of the Quran.

== Early childhood and education ==
Ziaabadi was born in 1928, in Ziaabad, to a religious family. His father Seyyed Mahmoud Ziaabadi was a well-trusted and known clergy man who would often lead prayers. Ziaabadi began his Islamic studies in Qazvin Seminary, however, in 1949 he left to continue his Islamic studies in Qom Seminary, where he was taught by the likes of Hossein Borujerdi, Muhammad Husayn Tabatabai, and Ruhollah Khomeini for around 12 years.

== Migration to Tehran ==
After spending 12 years studying in Qom Seminary, it was in 1961 after the death of Hossein Borujerdi in which he migrated to Tehran. At the time, there was a lack of Islamic Scholars in big cities. This prompted Ayatollah Hossein Borujerdi to influence scholars migrating to big cities in Iran and establishing Islamic Seminaries there. Thus, similar to Ayatollah Haghsenas, he migrated to Tehran under the influence of Borujerdi. He spent the rest of his life teaching and studying alongside Ahmad Mojtahedi Tehrani, in the Ayatollah Mojtahed Theological School.

== Death ==
Ziaabadi died on 8 February 2021, aged 92 or 93; it was presumed he died of Coronavirus during the COVID-19 pandemic in Iran, however, it was actually due to coronary heart disease and his old age that led to his death. His death prompted many popular figures in Iran to send their condolences such as Hassan Rouhani and Ali Khamenei due to his popularity. Many attended his funeral, and he is buried in Shah Abdol-Azim Shrine.

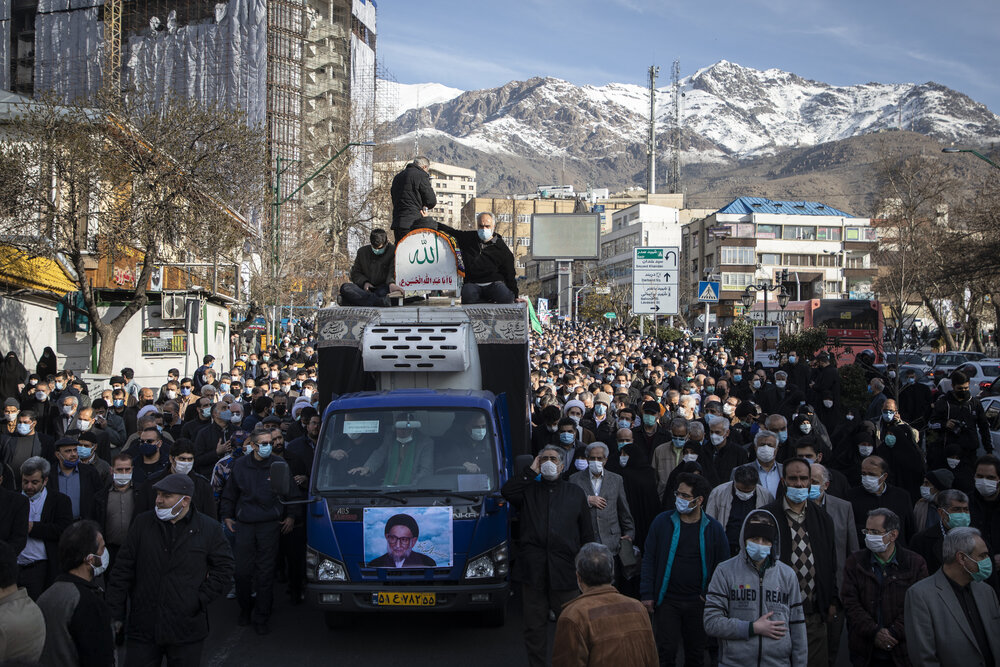
Funeral of Ayatollah Ziaabadi

== See also ==
- List of ayatollahs
