= Nader Goli Rural District =

Rural district in West Azerbaijan province, Iran

Nader Goli Rural District Persian: دهستان نادرگلی
- Rural District
- Location within Iran
- Coordinates: 37°00′N 46°24′E
- Country: Iran
- Province: West Azerbaijan
- County: Baruq
- District: Central
- Established: 2021
- Capital: Nader Goli
- Time zone: UTC+3:30 (IRST)

Nader Goli Rural District (Persian: دهستان نادرگلی) is in the Central District (Note: Formerly Baruq District of Miandoab County) of Baruq County, West Azerbaijan province, Iran. Its capital is the village of Nader Goli, whose population at the time of the 2016 National Census was 777 people in 206 households.

== History ==
In 2021, Baruq District (Note: Renamed the Central District of Baruq County) was separated from Miandoab County in the establishment of Baruq County and renamed the Central District. Nader Goli Rural District was created in the same district.

== Other villages in the rural district ==
- Ali Bolaghi
- Amirabad
- Dash Alti
- Hamid
- Qareh Saqqal
- Qatar
- Qermezi Bolagh
- Sayenjeq
- Shurjeh Kord
