= Gandu, Iran =

Gandu (Persian: گندو) in Iran may refer to:

- Gandu, Razavi Khorasan
- Gandu, Sistan and Baluchestan
- Kandu, Iran (disambiguation)
