= Ziaabad =

City in Qazvin province, Iran

Ziaabad Persian: ضیاءآباد
- City
- Location within Iran
- Coordinates: 35°59′36″N 49°26′51″E
- Country: Iran
- Province: Qazvin
- County: Takestan
- District: Ziaabad

Population (2016)
  - Total: 8,262
- Time zone: UTC+3:30 (IRST)

Ziaabad (Persian: ضياءآباد) (Note: Also romanized as Ẕeyā’ābād, Ẕīā’ābād and Zīya Abad; formerly Shahr-e Shaqayeq (شَهرِ شَقايِق), also romanized as Shahr-e Shaqāyeq) is a city in, and the capital of, Ziaabad District of Takestan County, Qazvin province, Iran. It was the capital of Dodangeh-ye Olya Rural District until the capital was transferred to the village of Farsajin.

== Demographics ==
=== Language and ethnicity ===
This city is populated by Azerbaijani Turks.

=== Population ===
At the time of the 2006 National Census, the city's population was 8,385 in 2,411 households. The following census in 2011 counted 8,637 people in 2,671 households. The 2016 census measured the population of the city as 8,262 people in 2,737 households.

== Agriculture ==
The main agricultural production of Ziaabad is walnuts.

== See also ==
- Hossein Lashgari
- Seyyed Mohammad Ziaabadi
