= Saj, Iran =

Village in Qazvin province, Iran

Saj Persian: ساج
- Village
- Location within Iran
- Coordinates: 35°52′12″N 49°23′00″E
- Country: Iran
- Province: Qazvin
- County: Takestan
- District: Ziaabad
- Rural District: Dodangeh-ye Sofla

Population (2016)
  - Total: 377
- Time zone: UTC+3:30 (IRST)

Saj (Persian: ساج) (Note: Also romanized as Sāj; also known as Sāch, Salj, and Sanj) is a village in Dodangeh-ye Sofla Rural District of Ziaabad District, Takestan County, Qazvin province, Iran.

== Demographics ==
=== Population ===
At the time of the 2006 National Census, the village's population was 733 in 213 households. The following census in 2011 counted 489 people in 154 households. The 2016 census measured the population of the village as 377 people in 141 households.
