= Shizar, Takestan =

Village in Qazvin province, Iran

Shizar Persian: شيزر
- Village
- Location within Iran
- Coordinates: 35°47′10″N 49°25′39″E
- Country: Iran
- Province: Qazvin
- County: Takestan
- District: Ziaabad
- Rural District: Dodangeh-ye Sofla

Population (2016)
  - Total: 267
- Time zone: UTC+3:30 (IRST)

Shizar (Persian: شيزر) (Note: Also romanized as Shīzar; also known as Shazar and Shizar Afshariyeh) is a village in Dodangeh-ye Sofla Rural District of Ziaabad District, Takestan County, Qazvin province, Iran.

== Demographics ==
=== Population ===
At the time of the 2006 National Census, the village's population was 219 in 70 households. The following census in 2011 counted 138 people in 52 households. The 2016 census measured the population of the village as 267 people in 106 households.
