= Arbatsky =

Arbatsky (masculine), Arbatskaya (feminine), or Arbatskoye (neuter) may refer to:

- Arbatskaya (Arbatsko-Pokrovskaya line), a station on the Arbatsko-Pokrovskaya line of the Moscow Metro, Moscow, Russia
- Arbatskaya (Filyovskaya line), a station on the Filyovskaya line of the Moscow Metro, Moscow, Russia
- Arbatskaya Square, a square in central Moscow
- Arbatskaya Spit, common misspelling of Arabat Spit

== See also ==
- Arbat (disambiguation)
