= Hossein Lashkari =

Iranian pilot

- "Hossein Lashgari"
- Born: 11 March 1953; Ziaabad, Qazvin, Imperial State of Iran
- Died: 10 August 2009 (aged 56); Behesht-e Zahra, Tehran, Iran
- Burial place: Iran
- Education: Major general of the Islamic Republic of Iran Air Force
- Military career
- Allegiance: Islamic Republic of Iran
- Branch: Islamic Republic of Iran Air Force
- Service years: 1970-1972; (Note: conscripted) 1976-1999
- Rank: Major general
- Nickname: Seyyed-al-Usara of Iran
- Conflicts: Iran–Iraq War

Hossein Lashkari (Persian: حسین لشگری), known as "Seyyed-al-Usara of Iran" (i.e. the master of Iranian captives) (Persian: سیدالاسراء ایران), (born in 1953, died in 2009), is an Iranian pilot who was captured in the Iran–Iraq War, and was freed after 18 years in captivity in Iraq. He died on 10 August 2009 owing to complications caused by his imprisonment.

== Life ==
Hossein Lashkari who is also known as "Shahid-Lashkari" (Martyr Lashkari) was born in the village of Zia-Abad in the city of Qazvin. This Iranian pilot passed his elementary education in Zia-Abad and departed to the capital of Qazvin province. He was assigned to the 77-Khorasan Division to do his military service after getting his diploma-degree in 1971. Later on, he entered the Imperial Iranian Air Force in 1975. In the summer of 1977, Lashkari graduated from the army university as a second lieutenant. His highest rank was major general.

== Iran–Iraq War ==
Lashkari has been named as the last captured, "liberated martyr Major General Pilot Hossein-lashkari", fought in the Iran–Iraq War. After performing 12 missions, his fighter was hit by an enemy missile; he bailed out and was captured by Iraqi forces in Iraq. After the adoption of United Nations Security Council Resolution 598, Lashkari was separated from his fellow prisoners of war (POWs), and the second portion of his captivity lasted for 16 years. His individual captivity lasted for ten years. Afterwards, he was kept with 60 Iranian POWs for eight years. He was contacted by the Red Cross after 16 years and returned to the Islamic Republic of Iran two years later on 6 April 1998.

Hossein Lashkari eventually died on 10 August 2009 owing to complications caused by his captivity at the time of the Iran–Iraq War.

== See also ==
- Iran–Iraq War
- Islamic Republic of Iran Air Force
