= Arbat (Shymkent) =

Coordinates: 42.317407°N 69.585339°E

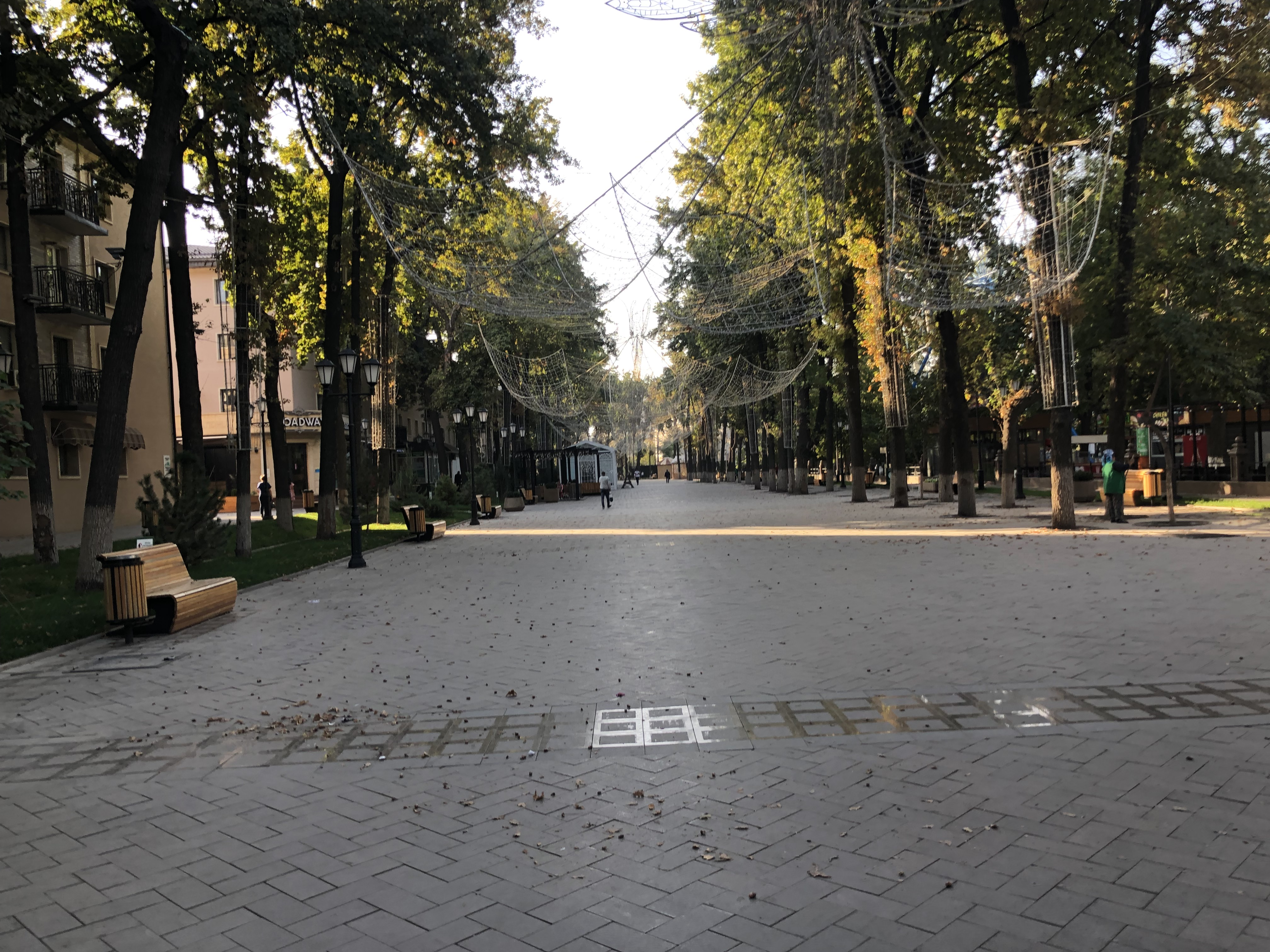
- Interactive map of Arbat
- Native name: Арбат (Kazakh)
- Length: 0.31 mi (0.50 km)
- Location: Shymkent, Kazakhstan

Construction
- Completion: June 2018

Arbat (Kazakh: Арбат) is a pedestrian zone located at the Beibitshilik Avenue in Shymkent, Kazakhstan. It was opened in June 2018 at the eve of Capital City Day. There are benches and bike paths in the zone as well as about 700 seedlings of spruce, chestnut, white birch and 1000 roses are planted.
