= Arbatan, Iran =

Arbatan (Persian: اربطان or ارباتان) in Iran may refer to:

- Arbatan, Heris (اربطان)
- Arbatan, Marand (ارباتان)
