= Aq Kand, Razan =

Aq Kand اقكند
- Village
- Location within Iran
- Coordinates: 35°20′19″N 48°58′06″E
- Country: Iran
- Province: Hamadan
- County: Razan
- Bakhsh: Central
- Rural District: Razan

Population (2006)
  - Total: 264
- Time zone: UTC+3:30 (IRST)
  - Summer (DST): UTC+4:30 (IRDT)

Aq Kand (Persian: اقكند, also Romanized as Āq Kand; also known as Āgh Kand, Agh Kand Sardrood, and Āq Kan) is a village in Razan Rural District, in the Central District of Razan County, Hamadan Province, Iran. At the 2006 census, its population was 264, in 61 families.
