= Aqa Kandi =

Aqa Kandi اقاكندي
- Village
- Location within Iran
- Coordinates: 38°31′59″N 46°49′00″E
- Country: Iran
- Province: East Azerbaijan
- County: Ahar
- Bakhsh: Central
- Rural District: Azghan

Population (2006)
  - Total: 121
- Time zone: UTC+3:30 (IRST)
  - Summer (DST): UTC+4:30 (IRDT)

Aqa Kandi (Persian: اقاكندي, also Romanized as Āqā Kandī; also known as Agakyandy, Āghā Kand, and Āq Kandī) is a village in Azghan Rural District, in the Central District of Ahar County, East Azerbaijan Province, Iran. At the 2006 census, its population was 121, in 22 families.
