= Akh Kand, Saqqez =

Akh Kand آخكند
- Village
- Location within Iran
- Coordinates: 36°18′49″N 46°11′19″E
- Country: Iran
- Province: Kurdistan
- County: Saqqez
- Bakhsh: Central
- Rural District: Sara

Population (2006)
  - Total: 572
- Time zone: UTC+3:30 (IRST)
  - Summer (DST): UTC+4:30 (IRDT)

Akh Kand (Persian: آخكند, also romanized as Ākh Kand) is a village in Sara Rural District, in the Central District of Saqqez County, Kurdistan Province, Iran. At the 2006 census, its population was 572, in 112 families. The village is populated by Kurds.
