= Baruq =

City in West Azerbaijan province, Iran

Baruq Persian: باروق
- City
- Location within Iran
- Coordinates: 36°57′18″N 46°19′25″E
- Country: Iran
- Province: West Azerbaijan
- County: Baruq
- District: Central
- Established as a city: 2004

Population (2016)
  - Total: 4,225
- Time zone: UTC+3:30 (IRST)

Baruq (Persian: باروق) (Note: Also romanized as Bārūq) is a city in the Central District (Note: Formerly Baruq District of Miandoab County) of Baruq County, West Azerbaijan province, Iran, serving as capital of both the county and the district. The village of Baruq was converted to a city in 2004.

== Etymology ==
According to Vladimir Minorsky, the name "Baruq" is derived from the Mongolian word barugh meaning "large, ample".

== Demographics ==
=== Population ===
At the time of the 2006 National Census, the city's population was 3,874 in 913 households, when it was in Baruq District (Note: Renamed the Central District of Baruq County) of Miandoab County. The following census in 2011 counted 4,118 people in 1,142 households. The 2016 census measured the population of the city as 4,225 people in 1,345 households.

In 2021, the district was separated from the county in the establishment of Baruq County and renamed the Central District, with Baruq as the new county's capital.
