= Arbatan, Salyan =

Arbatan
- Municipality
- Location within Azerbaijan
- Coordinates: 39°34′36″N 48°57′06″E
- Country: Azerbaijan
- Rayon: Salyan

Population
  - Total: 5,463
- Time zone: UTC+4 (AZT)
  - Summer (DST): UTC+5 (AZT)

Arbatan is a village and the most populous municipality, except for the capital Salyan, in the Salyan Rayon of Azerbaijan. It has a population of 5,463.
