= Aghkand-e Samaraq =

Aghkand-e Samaraq اغكندثمرق
- Village
- Location within Iran
- Coordinates: 37°20′47″N 46°15′32″E
- Country: Iran
- Province: East Azerbaijan
- County: Maragheh
- Bakhsh: Central
- Rural District: Qareh Naz

Population (2006)
  - Total: 333
- Time zone: UTC+3:30 (IRST)
  - Summer (DST): UTC+4:30 (IRDT)

Aghkand-e Samaraq (Persian: اغكندثمرق, also Romanized as Āgh Kand-e S̄amaraq; also known as Āqkand-e S̄amaraq) is a village in Qareh Naz Rural District, in the Central District of Maragheh County, East Azerbaijan Province, Iran. At the 2006 census, its population was 333, in 80 families.
