= Arbat, Armenia =

Arbat Արբաթ
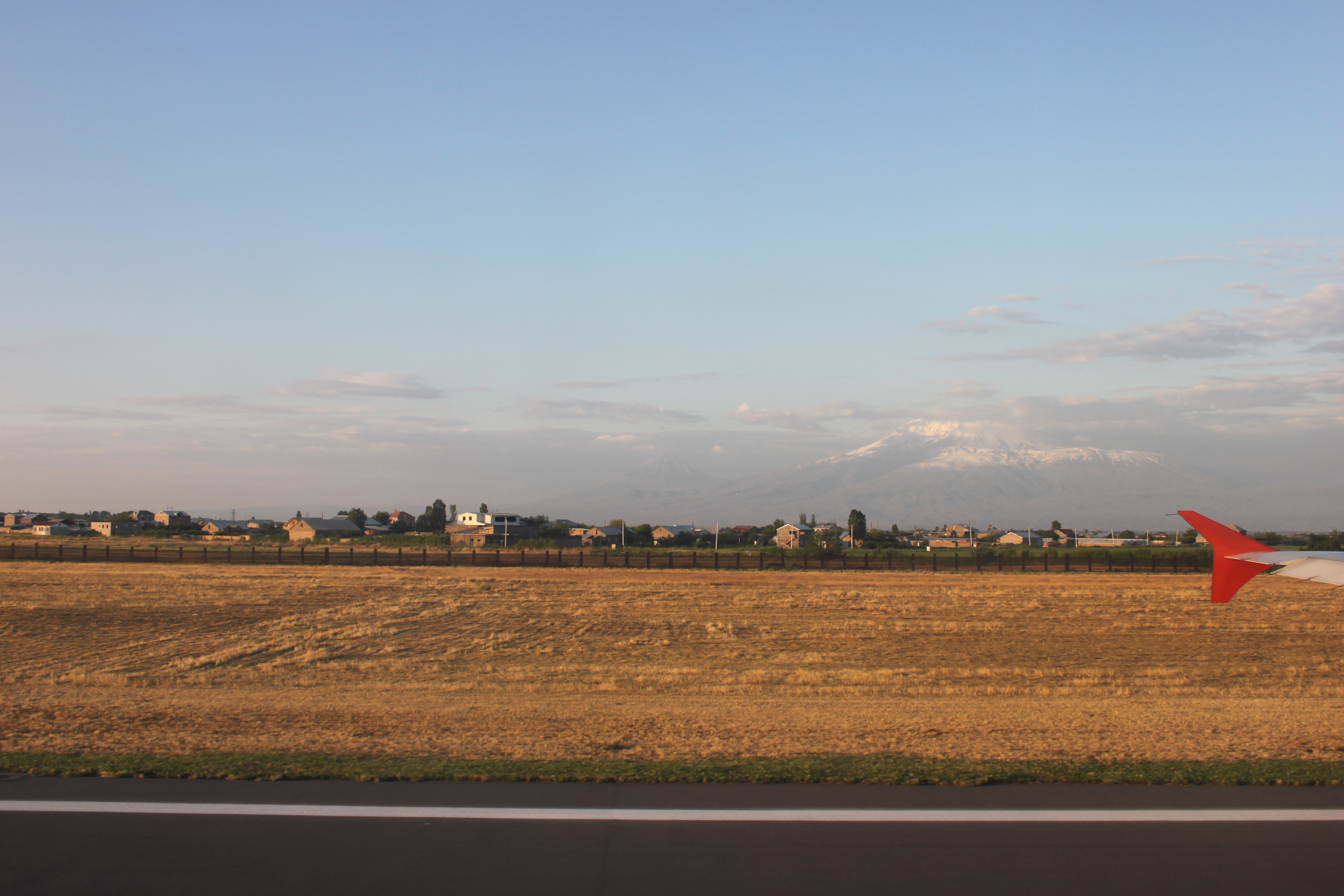
- Arbat as seen from the Zvartnots International Airport

- Location within Armenia Location within Ararat
- Coordinates: 40°08′13″N 44°23′54″E
- Country: Armenia
- Province: Ararat
- Municipality: Masis

Population (2011)
  - Total: 2,058
- Time zone: UTC+4
  - Summer (DST): UTC+5

Arbat (Armenian: Արբաթ) is a village in the Masis Municipality of the Ararat Province of Armenia.
