= Agh Kand, Charuymaq =

Agh Kand اغ كند
- Village
- Location within Iran
- Coordinates: 37°05′50″N 46°48′33″E
- Country: Iran
- Province: East Azerbaijan
- County: Charuymaq
- Bakhsh: Central
- Rural District: Quri Chay-ye Sharqi

Population (2006)
  - Total: 85
- Time zone: UTC+3:30 (IRST)
  - Summer (DST): UTC+4:30 (IRDT)

Agh Kand (Persian: اغ كند, also Romanized as Āgh Kand; also known as Āqkand and Āq Kand) is a village in Quri Chay-ye Sharqi Rural District, in the Central District of Charuymaq County, East Azerbaijan Province, Iran. At the 2006 census, its population was 85, in 19 families.
