= Arbat, Charuymaq =

Arbat اربط
- Village
- Location within Iran
- Coordinates: 37°00′18″N 47°04′43″E
- Country: Iran
- Province: East Azerbaijan
- County: Charuymaq
- Bakhsh: Shadian
- Rural District: Charuymaq-e Jonubesharqi

Population (2006)
  - Total: 85
- Time zone: UTC+3:30 (IRST)
  - Summer (DST): UTC+4:30 (IRDT)

Arbat (Persian: اربط, also Romanized as Arbaţ) is a village in Charuymaq-e Jonubesharqi Rural District, Shadian District, Charuymaq County, East Azerbaijan Province, Iran. At the 2006 census, its population was 85, in 14 families.
