= Dodangeh-ye Sofla Rural District =

Rural district in Qazvin province, Iran

Dodangeh-ye Sofla Rural District Persian: دهستان دودانگه سفلي
- Rural District
- Location within Iran
- Coordinates: 35°50′N 49°19′E
- Country: Iran
- Province: Qazvin
- County: Takestan
- District: Ziaaad
- Established: 1987
- Capital: Hoseynabad

Population (2016)
  - Total: 5,595
- Time zone: UTC+3:30 (IRST)

Dodangeh-ye Sofla Rural District (Persian: دهستان دودانگه سفلي) is in Ziaabad District of Takestan County, Qazvin province, Iran. Its capital is the village of Hoseynabad.

== Demographics ==
=== Population ===
At the time of the 2006 National Census, the rural district's population was 6,762 in 1,766 households. There were 5,997 inhabitants in 1,830 households at the following census of 2011. The 2016 census measured the population of the rural district as 5,595 in 1,829 households. The most populous of its 20 villages was Chuzah, with 1,291 people.

=== Other villages in the rural district ===
- Arunqash
- Azaddeh
- Hesar
- Nohab
- Qermezabad
- Saj
- Shakin
- Shizar
