= Gondow Bazar =

Gondow Bazar گندوبازار
- Village
- Location within Iran
- Coordinates: 25°38′04″N 61°04′48″E
- Country: Iran
- Province: Sistan and Baluchestan
- County: Chabahar
- Bakhsh: Polan
- Rural District: Polan

Population (2006)
  - Total: 217
- Time zone: UTC+3:30 (IRST)
  - Summer (DST): UTC+4:30 (IRDT)

Gondow Bazar (Persian: گندوبازار, also Romanized as Gondow Bāzār and Gandū Bāzār; also known as Gandū and Gondow) is a village in Polan Rural District, Polan District, Chabahar County, Sistan and Baluchestan Province, Iran. At the 2006 census, its population was 217, in 30 families.
