= Akh Kand, Divandarreh =

Akh Kand آخكند
- Village
- Location within Iran
- Coordinates: 36°06′01″N 47°16′39″E
- Country: Iran
- Province: Kurdistan
- County: Divandarreh
- Bakhsh: Central
- Rural District: Qaratureh

Population (2006)
  - Total: 542
- Time zone: UTC+3:30 (IRST)
  - Summer (DST): UTC+4:30 (IRDT)

Akh Kand (Persian: آخكند, also Romanized as Ākh Kand; also known as Āq Kand and Āqkand) is a village in Qaratureh Rural District, in the Central District of Divandarreh County, Kurdistan Province, Iran. At the 2006 census, its population was 542, in 115 families. The village is populated by Kurds.
