= Aq Kand, Zanjan =

Village in Zanjan province, Iran

Aq Kand Persian: اق كند
- Village
- Location within Iran
- Coordinates: 36°34′23″N 48°16′13″E
- Country: Iran
- Province: Zanjan
- County: Zanjan
- District: Central
- Rural District: Bughda Kandi

Population (2016)
  - Total: 1,646
- Time zone: UTC+3:30 (IRST)

Aq Kand (Persian: اق كند) (Note: Also romanized as Āq Kand; also known as Akhkend and Āq Kandī) is a village in Bughda Kandi Rural District of the Central District of Zanjan County, Zanjan province, Iran.

== Demographics ==
=== Population ===
At the time of the 2006 National Census, the village's population was 1,694 in 400 households. The following census in 2011 counted 1,785 people in 483 households. The 2016 census measured the population of the village as 1,646 people in 480 households. It was the most populous village in its rural district.
