= Dodangeh-ye Olya Rural District =

Rural district in Qazvin province, Iran

Dodangeh-ye Olya Rural District Persian: دهستان دودانگه عليا
- Rural District
- Location within Iran
- Coordinates: 36°03′N 49°26′E
- Country: Iran
- Province: Qazvin
- County: Takestan
- District: Ziaabad
- Established: 1987
- Capital: Farsajin

Population (2016)
  - Total: 5,061
- Time zone: UTC+3:30 (IRST)

Dodangeh-ye Olya Rural District (Persian: دهستان دودانگه عليا) is in Ziaabad District of Takestan County, Qazvin province, Iran. Its capital is the village of Farsajin. The previous capital of the rural district was the village of Ziaabad, now a city.

== Demographics ==
=== Population ===
At the time of the 2006 National Census, the rural district's population was 6,002 in 1,637 households. There were 4,898 inhabitants in 1,554 households at the following census of 2011. The 2016 census measured the population of the rural district as 5,061 in 1,658 households. The most populous of its 21 villages was Farsajin, with 1,860 people.

=== Other villages in the rural district ===
- Avarneh
- Hoseynabad-e Jarandaq
- Jarandaq
- Mehin
- Qaleh Juq
- Qaracheh Qia
- Shanin
- Tuyuqchi
