= Nokhtalu District =

District in West Azerbaijan province, Iran

Nokhtalu District Persian: بخش نختالو
- District
- Location within Iran
- Coordinates: 36°54′N 46°40′E
- Country: Iran
- Province: West Azerbaijan
- County: Baruq
- Established: 2021
- Capital: Nokhtalu
- Time zone: UTC+3:30 (IRST)

Nokhtalu District (Persian: بخش نختالو) is in Baruq County, West Azerbaijan province, Iran. Its capital is the village of Nokhtalu, whose population at the 2016 National Census was 127 people in 38 households.

== History ==
In 2021, Baruq District (Note: Renamed the Central District of Baruq County) was separated from Miandoab County in the establishment of Baruq County and renamed the Central District. The new county was divided into two districts of two rural districts each, with Baruq as its capital and only city at the time.

== Demographics ==
=== Administrative divisions ===
Nokhtalu District
Administrative Divisions
Ajorluy-ye Gharbi RD
Ajorluy-ye Sharqi RD
RD = Rural District
