= Baruq Rural District (Baruq County) =

Rural district in West Azerbaijan province, Iran

Baruq Rural District Persian: دهستان باروق
- Rural District
- Location within Iran
- Coordinates: 36°56′N 46°16′E
- Country: Iran
- Province: West Azerbaijan
- County: Baruq
- District: Central
- Established: 1987
- Capital: Chali Khamaz

Population (2016)
  - Total: 11,575
- Time zone: UTC+3:30 (IRST)

Baruq Rural District (Persian: دهستان باروق) is in the Central District (Note: Formerly Baruq District of Miandoab County) of Baruq County, West Azerbaijan province, Iran. Its capital is the village of Chali Khamaz.

== Demographics ==
=== Population ===
At the time of the 2006 National Census, the rural district's population (as a part of Baruq District (Note: Renamed the Central District of Baruq County) in Miandoab County) was 11,530 in 2,553 households. There were 12,024 inhabitants in 3,378 households at the following census of 2011. The 2016 census measured the population of the rural district as 11,575 in 3,429 households. The most populous of its 22 villages was Gol Soleymanabad, with 3,436 people.

In 2021, the district was separated from the county in the establishment of Baruq County and renamed the Central District.

=== Other villages in the rural district ===
- Ali Yar Kandi
- Aq Kand-e Baruq
- Aydisheh
- Mirza Nezam
- Nowruzlu
- Qeshlaq-e Nowruzlu
- Shurjeh Baruq
