= Ajorluy-ye Sharqi Rural District =

Rural district in West Azerbaijan province, Iran

Ajorluy-ye Sharqi Rural District Persian: دهستان آجرلوئ شرقي
- Rural District
- Location within Iran
- Coordinates: 36°55′N 46°46′E
- Country: Iran
- Province: West Azerbaijan
- County: Baruq
- District: Nokhtalu
- Established: 1987
- Capital: Zagheh

Population (2016)
  - Total: 3,816
- Time zone: UTC+3:30 (IRST)

Ajorluy-ye Sharqi Rural District (Persian: دهستان آجرلوئ شرقي) is in Nokhtalu District of Baruq County, West Azerbaijan province, Iran. Its capital is the village of Zagheh. The previous capital of the rural district was the village of Nokhtalu.

== Demographics ==
=== Population ===
At the time of the 2006 National Census, the rural district's population (as a part of Baruq District (Note: Renamed the Central District of Baruq County) in Miandoab County) was 4,903 in 969 households. There were 4,027 inhabitants in 1,023 households at the following census of 2011. The 2016 census measured the population of the rural district as 3,816 in 1,088 households. The most populous of its 28 villages was Teymur Kandi, (Note: Formerly known as Mohammadqoli Qeshlaq) with 366 people.

In 2021, the district was separated from the county in the establishment of Baruq County and renamed the Central District. The rural district was transferred to the new Nokhtalu District.

=== Other villages in the rural district ===
- Badamlu
- Hajji Kandi
- Heydar Baghi
- Owlamchi
- Yasti Kand
