= Ajorluy-ye Gharbi Rural District =

Rural district in West Azerbaijan province, Iran

Ajorluy-ye Gharbi Rural District Persian: دهستان آجرلوئ غربي
- Rural District
- Location within Iran
- Coordinates: 36°58′N 46°31′E
- Country: Iran
- Province: West Azerbaijan
- County: Baruq
- District: Nokhtalu
- Established: 1987
- Capital: Qoroqchi

Population (2016)
  - Total: 2,769
- Time zone: UTC+3:30 (IRST)

Ajorluy-ye Gharbi Rural District (Persian: دهستان آجرلوئ غربي) is in Nokhtalu District of Baruq County, West Azerbaijan province, Iran. Its capital is the village of Qoroqchi.

== Demographics ==
=== Population ===
At the time of the 2006 National Census, the rural district's population (as a part of Baruq District (Note: Renamed the Central District of Baruq County) in Miandoab County) was 3,355 in 799 households. There were 2,845 inhabitants in 778 households at the following census of 2011. The 2016 census measured the population of the rural district as 2,769 in 861 households. The most populous of its 25 villages was Tak Aghaj, with 313 people.

In 2021, the district was separated from the county in the establishment of Baruq County and renamed the Central District. The rural district was transferred to the new Nokhtalu District.

=== Other villages in the rural district ===
- Jan Aqa
- Zaranji
