= Ziaabad District =

District in Qazvin province, Iran

Ziaabad District Persian: بخش ضیاءآباد
- District
- Location within Iran
- Coordinates: 35°58′N 49°21′E
- Country: Iran
- Province: Qazvin
- County: Takestan
- Established: 1989
- Capital: Ziaabad

Population (2016)
  - Total: 18,918
- Time zone: UTC+3:30 (IRST)

Ziaabad District (Persian: بخش ضیاءآباد) is in Takestan County, Qazvin province, Iran. Its capital is the city of Ziaabad.

== Demographics ==
=== Population ===
At the time of the 2006 National Census, the district's population was 21,149 in 5,814 households. The following census in 2011 counted 19,532 people in 6,055 households. The 2016 census measured the population of the district as 18,918 inhabitants in 6,224 households.

=== Administrative divisions ===
Ziaabad District Population
Administrative Divisions	2006	2011	2016
Dodangeh-ye Olya RD	6,002	4,898	5,061
Dodangeh-ye Sofla RD	6,762	5,997	5,595
Ziaabad (city)	8,385	8,637	8,262
Total	21,149	19,532	18,918
RD = Rural District
