= Baruq County =

County in West Azerbaijan province, Iran

Baruq County Persian: شهرستان باروق
- County
- Location of Baruq County in West Azerbaijan province (bottom right, purple)

- Location of West Azerbaijan province in Iran
- Coordinates: 36°57′N 46°37′E
- Country: Iran
- Province: West Azerbaijan
- Established: 2021
- Capital: Baruq
- Districts: Central, Nokhtalu
- Time zone: UTC+3:30 (IRST)

Baruq County (Persian: شهرستان باروق) is in West Azerbaijan province, Iran. Its capital is the city of Baruq, whose population at the time of the 2016 National Census was 4,225 people in 1,345 households.

== History ==
In 2021, Baruq District (Note: Renamed the Central District of Baruq County) was separated from Miandoab County in the establishment of Baruq County and renamed the Central District. The new county was divided into two districts of two rural districts each, with Baruq as its capital and only city at the time.

== Demographics ==
=== Administrative divisions ===
Baruq County's administrative structure is shown in the following table.

Baruq County
Administrative Divisions
Central District (Note: Formerly Baruq District of Miandoab County)
Baruq RD
Nader Goli RD
Baruq (city)
Nokhtalu District
Ajorluy-ye Gharbi RD
Ajorluy-ye Sharqi RD
RD = Rural District
