= Central District (Baruq County) =

District in West Azerbaijan province, Iran

Central District (Baruq County) Persian: بخش مرکزی شهرستان باروق
- District
- Location within Iran
- Coordinates: 36°59′N 46°20′E
- Country: Iran
- Province: West Azerbaijan
- County: Baruq
- Established: 2001
- Capital: Baruq

Population (2016)
  - Total: 22,385 (Note: As Baruq District of Miandoab County)
- Time zone: UTC+3:30 (IRST)

The Central District of Baruq County (Persian: بخش مرکزی شهرستان باروق) (Note: Formerly Baruq District (بخش باروق) of Miandoab County) is in West Azerbaijan province, Iran. Its capital is the city of Baruq.

== History ==
In 2021, Baruq District was separated from Miandoab County in the establishment of Baruq County and renamed the Central District. The new county was divided into two districts of two rural districts each, with Baruq as its capital and only city at the time.

== Demographics ==
=== Population ===
At the time of the 2006 National Census, the district's population (as Baruq District of Miandoab County) was 23,662 in 5,234 households. The following census in 2011 counted 23,014 people in 6,321 households. The 2016 census measured the population of the district as 22,385 inhabitants in 6,723 households.

=== Administrative divisions ===
Central District (Baruq County) (Note: As Baruq District of Miandoab County at the 2006, 2011, and 2016 censuses)
Administrative Divisions	2006	2011	2016
Ajorluy-ye Gharbi RD (Note: Transferred to Nokhtalu District after the 2016 census)	3,355	2,845	2,769
Ajorluy-ye Sharqi RD	4,903	4,027	3,816
Baruq RD	11,530	12,024	11,575
Nader Goli RD (Note: Established after the 2016 census)			
Baruq (city)	3,874	4,118	4,225
Total	23,662	23,014	22,385
RD: = Rural District
