= Dastgird =

Dastgird or Dastgerd or Dastjerd or Dastjird (Persian: دستگرد), also rendered as Dast-i-Jird or Dasteh Jerd or Dashtgerd or Dashtgird, may refer to:

== Chaharmahal and Bakhtiari Province ==
- Dastgerd, Borujen, a village in Borujen County
- Dastgerd, Kiar, a village in Kiar County
- Dastgerd Rural District (Chaharmahal and Bakhtiari Province), in Kiar County
- Dastgerd, Lordegan, a village in Lordegan County

== East Azerbaijan Province ==
- Dastjerd, Azarshahr, a village in Azarshahr County
- Dastjerd, Meyaneh, a village in Meyaneh County
- Dastjerd, Varzaqan, a village in Varzaqan County
- Dastjerd Rural District (East Azerbaijan Province), in Azarshahr County

== Fars Province ==
- Dastjerd, Estahban, a village in Estahban County
- Dastjerd, Khorrambid, a village in Khorrambid County

== Hamadan Province ==
- Dastjerd, Bahar, a village in Bahar County
- Dastjerd, Kabudarahang, a village in Kabudarahang County

== Hormozgan Province ==
- Dastgerd-e Dargaz, a village in Bashagard County
- Dastgerd-e Nagerd, a village in Bashagard County

== Isfahan Province ==
- Dastjerd, Ardestan, a village in Ardestan County
- Dastgerd, a city in Borkhar County
- Dastgerd, Fereydunshahr, a village in Fereydunshahr County
- Dastjerd, Isfahan, a village in Isfahan County
- Dastgerd, Isfahan, a village in Isfahan County
- Dastgerd, alternate name of Dastgerdu, a village in Isfahan County
- Dastgerd-e Mar, a village in Isfahan County
- Dastgerd, Mobarakeh, a village in Mobarakeh County
- Dastjerd, Natanz, a village in Natanz County

== Kerman Province ==
- Dastjerd, Bardsir, a village in Bardsir County
- Dastjerd, Kerman, a village in Kerman County
- Dastjerd, Ravar, a village in Ravar County

== Kermanshah Province ==
- Dastjerd-e Olya, Kermanshah, a village in Sahneh County
- Dastjerd-e Sofla, Kermanshah, a village in Sahneh County

== Kohgiluyeh and Boyer-Ahmad Province ==
- Dastgerd, Kohgiluyeh, a village in Kohgiluyeh County
- Dastgerd, Charusa, a village in Kohgiluyeh County

== Lorestan Province ==
- Dastgerd, Besharat, a village in Besharat District, Aligudarz County
- Dastgerd, Zaz va Mahru, a village in Zaz va Mahru District, Aligudarz County

== Markazi Province ==
- Dastjerd, Ashtian, a village in Ashtian County
- Dastjerd, Shazand, a village in Shazand County

== North Khorasan Province ==
- Dastjerd, North Khorasan, a village in North Khorasan Province, Iran

== Qazvin Province ==
- Dastjerd, Qazvin, a village in Qazvin Province, Iran
- Dastjerd-e Olya, a village in Qazvin Province, Iran
- Dastjerd-e Sofla, Qazvin, a village in Qazvin Province, Iran
- Dastjerd Rural District (Qazvin Province), in Qazvin County, Qazvin Province, Iran

== Qom Province ==
- Dastjerd, a city in Qom County, Qom Province, Iran
- Dastgerd, Qom, a village in Qom County, Qom Province, Iran
- Dastjerd Rural District (Qom Province), in Qom County, Qom Province, Iran

== Razavi Khorasan Province ==
- Dastgerd, Razavi Khorasan, a village in Chenaran County
- Dastjerd, Firuzeh, a village in Firuzeh County
- Dastjerd-e Aqa Bozorg, a village in Mashhad County
- Dastjerd, Rashtkhvar, a village in Rashtkhvar County

== Semnan Province ==
- Dastjerd, Semnan, a village in Shahrud County

== South Khorasan Province ==
- Dastgerd, Birjand, a village in Birjand County
- Dastgerd, Darmian, a village in Darmian County
- Dastgerd, Khusf, a village in Khusf County
- Dastjerd, Qaen, a village in Qaen County
- Dastgerd, Sarbisheh, a village in Sarbisheh County
- Dastgerd, Mud, a village in Sarbisheh County

== West Azerbaijan Province ==
- Dastjerd, West Azerbaijan, a village in Urmia County
- Dastjerd-e Abbasabad, a village in Urmia County

== Yazd Province ==
- Dastjerd, Yazd, a village in Taft County

== See also ==
- Dastgerdan (disambiguation)
- Dastagird, Sassanian city near Ctesiphon
