= Dastjerd-e Sofla =

Dastjerd-e Sofla or Dastgerd-e Sofla (Persian: دستجردسفلي) may refer to:

- Dastjerd-e Sofla, Kerman
- Dastjerd-e Sofla, Kermanshah
- Dastjerd-e Sofla, Qazvin
