= Hasanabad, Rudbar-e Alamut-e Gharbi =

Village in Qazvin province, Iran

Hasanabad Persian: حسن اباد
- Village
- Location within Iran
- Coordinates: 36°28′06″N 50°16′47″E
- Country: Iran
- Province: Qazvin
- County: Qazvin
- District: Rudbar-e Alamut-e Gharbi
- Rural District: Rudbar-e Mohammad-e Zamani

Population (2016)
  - Total: 423
- Time zone: UTC+3:30 (IRST)

Hasanabad (Persian: حسن اباد) (Note: Also romanized as Ḩasanābād) is a village in Rudbar-e Mohammad-e Zamani Rural District of Rudbar-e Alamut-e Gharbi District (Note: Formerly Rudbar-e Shahrestan District) in Qazvin County, Qazvin province, Iran.

== Demographics ==
=== Population ===
At the time of the 2006 National Census, the village's population was 443 in 144 households. The following census in 2011 counted 287 people in 95 households. The 2016 census measured the population of the village as 423 people in 152 households.
