= Fashak, Qazvin =

Village in Qazvin province, Iran

Fashak Persian: فشك
- Village
- Location within Iran
- Coordinates: 36°37′33″N 50°11′07″E
- Country: Iran
- Province: Qazvin
- County: Qazvin
- District: Rudbar-e Alamut-e Gharbi
- Rural District: Rudbar-e Shahrestan

Population (2016)
  - Total: 411
- Time zone: UTC+3:30 (IRST)

Fashak (Persian: فشك) is a village in Rudbar-e Shahrestan Rural District of Rudbar-e Alamut-e Gharbi District (Note: Formerly Rudbar-e Shahrestan District) in Qazvin County, Qazvin province, Iran.

== Demographics ==
=== Population ===
At the time of the 2006 National Census, the village's population was 372 in 96 households. The following census in 2011 counted 215 people in 67 households. The 2016 census measured the population of the village as 411 people in 132 households.
