= Mohammadabad, Qazvin =

Village in Qazvin province, Iran

Mohammadabad Persian: محمداباد
- Village
- Location within Iran
- Coordinates: 36°29′07″N 50°17′36″E
- Country: Iran
- Province: Qazvin
- County: Qazvin
- District: Rudbar-e Alamut-e Gharbi
- Rural District: Rudbar-e Mohammad-e Zamani

Population (2016)
  - Total: 209
- Time zone: UTC+3:30 (IRST)

Mohammadabad (Persian: محمداباد) (Note: Also romanized as Moḩammadābād) is a village in Rudbar-e Mohammad-e Zamani Rural District of Rudbar-e Alamut-e Gharbi District, (Note: Formerly Rudbar-e Shahrestan District) Qazvin County, Qazvin province, Iran.

== Demographics ==
=== Population ===
At the time of the 2006 National Census, the village's population was 274 in 72 households. The following census in 2011 counted 190 people in 59 households. The 2016 census measured the population of the village as 209 people in 70 households.
