= Juyank =

Village in Qazvin province, Iran

Juyank Persian: جوينك
- Village
- Location within Iran
- Coordinates: 36°31′13″N 50°19′11″E
- Country: Iran
- Province: Qazvin
- County: Qazvin
- District: Rudbar-e Alamut-e Gharbi
- Rural District: Rudbar-e Mohammad-e Zamani

Population (2016)
  - Total: 401
- Time zone: UTC+3:30 (IRST)

Juyank (Persian: جوينك) (Note: Also romanized as Jūyanḵ) is a village in Rudbar-e Mohammad-e Zamani Rural District of Rudbar-e Alamut-e Gharbi District (Note: Formerly Rudbar-e Shahrestan District) in Qazvin County, Qazvin province, Iran.

== Demographics ==
=== Population ===
At the time of the 2006 National Census, the village's population was 351 in 90 households. The following census in 2011 counted 330 people in 108 households. The 2016 census measured the population of the village as 401 people in 116 households.
