= Talater =

Village in Qazvin province, Iran

Talater Persian: تلاتُر
- Village
- Location within Iran
- Coordinates: 36°37′29″N 50°09′56″E
- Country: Iran
- Province: Qazvin
- County: Qazvin
- District: Rudbar-e Alamut-e Gharbi
- Rural District: Rudbar-e Shahrestan

Population (2016)
  - Total: 301
- Time zone: UTC+3:30 (IRST)

Talater (Persian: تلاتُر) (Note: Also romanized as Talāter and Talator) is a village in Rudbar-e Shahrestan Rural District of Rudbar-e Alamut-e Gharbi District (Note: Formerly Rudbar-e Shahrestan District) in Qazvin County, Qazvin province, Iran.

== Demographics ==
=== Population ===
At the time of the 2006 National Census, the village's population was 162 in 51 households. The following census in 2011 counted 84 people in 34 households. The 2016 census measured the population of the village as 301 people in 105 households.
