= Bahramabad, Qazvin =

Village in Qazvin province, Iran

Bahramabad Persian: بهرام اباد
- Village
- Location within Iran
- Coordinates: 36°32′39″N 50°09′53″E
- Country: Iran
- Province: Qazvin
- County: Qazvin
- District: Rudbar-e Alamut-e Gharbi
- Rural District: Rudbar-e Shahrestan

Population (2016)
  - Total: 150
- Time zone: UTC+3:30 (IRST)

Bahramabad (Persian: بهرام اباد) (Note: Also romanized as Bahrāmābād) is a village in, and the capital of, Rudbar-e Shahrestan Rural District in Rudbar-e Alamut-e Gharbi District (Note: Formerly Rudbar-e Shahrestan District) of Qazvin County, Qazvin province, Iran.

== Demographics ==
=== Population ===
At the time of the 2006 National Census, the village's population was 83 in 21 households. The following census in 2011 counted 114 people in 37 households. The 2016 census measured the population of the village as 150 people in 53 households.
