= Rudbar-e Shahrestan =

Rudbar-e Shahrestan (Persian: رودبارشهرستان) may refer to:

- Rudbar-e Shahrestan District
- Rudbar-e Shahrestan Rural District
