= Azganin-e Sofla =

Azganin-e Sofla ازگنين سفلي
- Village
- Location within Iran
- Coordinates: 36°30′00″N 50°22′07″E
- Country: Iran
- Province: Qazvin
- County: Qazvin
- Bakhsh: Alamut-e Gharbi
- Rural District: Rudbar-e Mohammad-e Zamani

Population (2006)
  - Total: 291
- Time zone: UTC+3:30 (IRST)
  - Summer (DST): UTC+4:30 (IRDT)

Azganin-e Sofla (Persian: ازگنين سفلي, also Romanized as Azganīn-e Soflá; also known as Azganīn-e Pā’īn, Ezgenīn Pā’īn, and Pāīn Azgarin) is a village in Rudbar-e Mohammad-e Zamani Rural District, Alamut-e Gharbi District, Qazvin County, Qazvin Province, Iran. At the 2006 census, its population was 291, in 96 families.
