= Rashkin =

Village in Qazvin province, Iran

Rashkin Persian: رشكين
- Village
- Location within Iran
- Coordinates: 36°37′46″N 50°11′09″E
- Country: Iran
- Province: Qazvin
- County: Qazvin
- District: Rudbar-e Alamut-e Gharbi
- Rural District: Rudbar-e Shahrestan

Population (2016)
  - Total: 323
- Time zone: UTC+3:30 (IRST)

Rashkin (Persian: رشكين) (Note: Also romanized as Rashkīn) is a village in Rudbar-e Shahrestan Rural District of Rudbar-e Alamut-e Gharbi District (Note: Formerly Rudbar-e Shahrestan District) in Qazvin County, Qazvin province, Iran.

== Demographics ==
=== Population ===
At the time of the 2006 National Census, the village's population was 153 in 47 households. The following census in 2011 counted 190 people in 61 households. The 2016 census measured the population of the village as 323 people in 100 households.
