= Por Rud =

Village in Qazvin province, Iran

Por Rud Persian: پررود
- Village
- Location within Iran
- Coordinates: 36°35′41″N 50°09′13″E
- Country: Iran
- Province: Qazvin
- County: Qazvin
- District: Rudbar-e Alamut-e Gharbi
- Rural District: Rudbar-e Shahrestan

Population (2016)
  - Total: 416
- Time zone: UTC+3:30 (IRST)

Por Rud (Persian: پررود) (Note: Also romanized as Por Rūd) is a village in Rudbar-e Shahrestan Rural District of Rudbar-e Alamut-e Gharbi District (Note: Formerly Rudbar-e Shahrestan District) in Qazvin County, Qazvin province, Iran.

== Demographics ==
=== Population ===
At the time of the 2006 National Census, the village's population was 206 in 48 households. The following census in 2011 counted 245 people in 78 households. The 2016 census measured the population of the village as 416 people in 133 households.
