= Vartavan =

Village in Qazvin province, Iran

Vartavan Persian: ورتوان
- Village
- Location within Iran
- Coordinates: 36°26′11″N 50°10′16″E
- Country: Iran
- Province: Qazvin
- County: Qazvin
- District: Rudbar-e Alamut-e Gharbi
- Rural District: Rudbar-e Shahrestan

Population (2016)
  - Total: 359
- Time zone: UTC+3:30 (IRST)

Vartavan (Persian: ورتوان) (Note: Also romanized as Vartavān) is a village in Rudbar-e Shahrestan Rural District of Rudbar-e Alamut-e Gharbi District (Note: Formerly Rudbar-e Shahrestan District) in Qazvin County, Qazvin province, Iran.

== Demographics ==
=== Population ===
At the time of the 2006 National Census, the village's population was 268 in 73 households. The following census in 2011 counted 118 people in 53 households. The 2016 census measured the population of the village as 359 people in 130 households.
