= Hir, Qazvin =

Village in Qazvin province, Iran

Hir Persian: هير
- Village
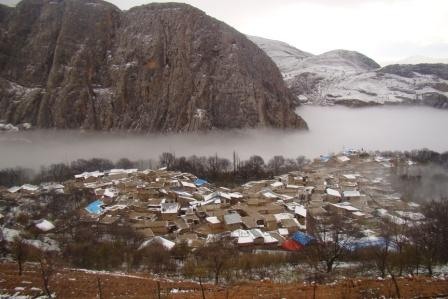
- Village of Hir in winter

- Location within Iran
- Coordinates: 36°35′43″N 50°15′33″E
- Country: Iran
- Province: Qazvin
- County: Qazvin
- District: Rudbar-e Alamut-e Gharbi
- Rural District: Rudbar-e Shahrestan

Population (2016)
  - Total: 726
- Time zone: UTC+3:30 (IRST)

Hir (Persian: هير) (Note: Also romanized as Hīr) is a village in Rudbar-e Shahrestan Rural District of Rudbar-e Alamut-e Gharbi District (Note: Formerly Rudbar-e Shahrestan District) in Qazvin County, Qazvin province, Iran. Lambsar fortress is close by.

== Demographics ==
=== Population ===
At the time of the 2006 National Census, the village's population was 639 in 179 households. The following census in 2011 counted 678 people in 227 households. The 2016 census measured the population of the village as 726 people in 243 households. It was the most populous village in its rural district.
