= Durchak =

Village in Qazvin province, Iran

Durchak Persian: دورچاک
- Village
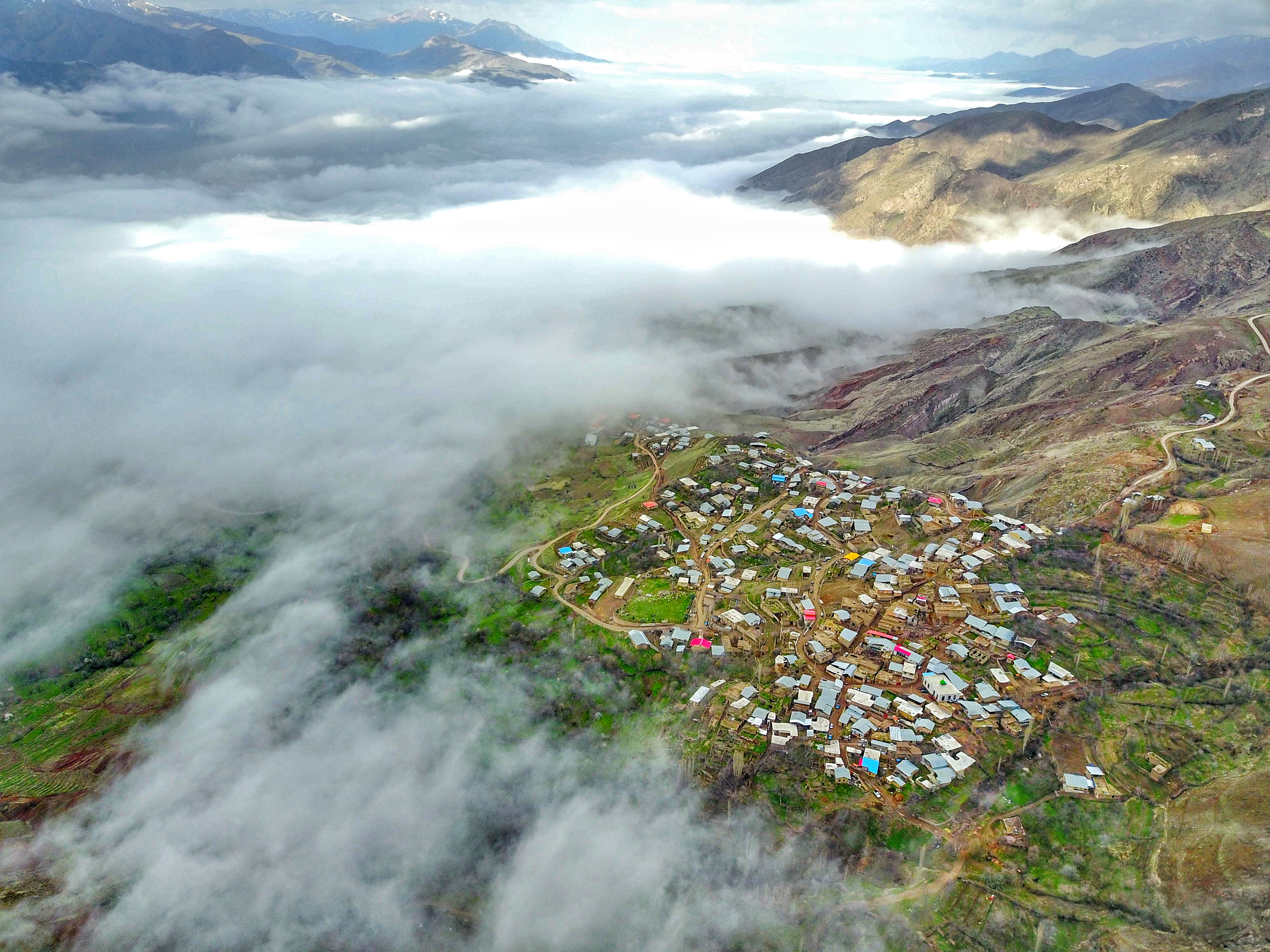
- Aerial shot of Durchak village in early spring

- Location within Iran
- Coordinates: 36°32′02″N 50°16′45″E
- Country: Iran
- Province: Qazvin
- County: Qazvin
- District: Rudbar-e Alamut-e Gharbi
- Rural District: Rudbar-e Mohammad-e Zamani

Population (2016)
  - Total: 381
- Time zone: UTC+3:30 (IRST)

Durchak (Persian: دورچاک) (Note: Also romanized as Dowrchāk and Dūrchāk; also known as Darchāk) is a village in Rudbar-e Mohammad-e Zamani Rural District of Rudbar-e Alamut-e Gharbi District (Note: Formerly Rudbar-e Shahrestan District) in Qazvin County, Qazvin province, Iran.

== Demographics ==
=== Population ===
At the time of the 2006 National Census, the village's population was 305 in 107 households. The following census in 2011 counted 346 people in 124 households. The 2016 census measured the population of the village as 381 people in 149 households.
