= Dastgerdan =

Dastgerdan (Persian: دستگردان) may refer to:

- Dastgerdan, Razavi Khorasan
- Baghat-e Dastgerdan, Razavi Khorasan Province
- Dastgerdan, South Khorasan
- Dastgerdan District, in South Khorasan Province
- Dastgerdan Rural District, in South Khorasan Province

== See also ==
- Dastgerd (disambiguation)
