= Khosrud =

Village in Qazvin province, Iran

Dastjerd-e Sofla Persian: خسرود
- Village
- Location within Iran
- Coordinates: 36°33′39″N 50°02′49″E
- Country: Iran
- Province: Qazvin
- County: Qazvin
- District: Rudbar-e Alamut-e Gharbi
- Rural District: Dastjerd

Population (2016)
  - Total: 312
- Time zone: UTC+3:30 (IRST)

Khosrud (Persian: خسرود) (Note: Also romanized as Khosrood and Khosrūd) is a village in Dastjerd Rural District of Rudbar-e Alamut-e Gharbi District (Note: Formerly Rudbar-e Shahrestan District) in Qazvin County, Qazvin province, Iran.

== Demographics ==
=== Population ===
At the time of the 2006 National Census, the village's population was 248 in 68 households. The following census in 2011 counted 300 people in 86 households. The 2016 census measured the population of the village as 312 people in 105 households.
