= Aku Jan-e Qadim =

Village in Qazvin province, Iran

Aku Jan-e Qadim Persian: اکوجان قديم
- Village
- Location within Iran
- Coordinates: 36°37′37″N 50°08′33″E
- Country: Iran
- Province: Qazvin
- County: Qazvin
- District: Rudbar-e Alamut-e Gharbi
- Rural District: Rudbar-e Shahrestan

Population (2016)
  - Total: 331
- Time zone: UTC+3:30 (IRST)

Aku Jan-e Qadim (Persian: اکوجان قديم) (Note: Formerly known as Aku Jan (اكوجان), also romanized as Ākū Jān and Ekūjān) is a village in Rudbar-e Shahrestan Rural District of Rudbar-e Alamut-e Gharbi District (Note: Formerly Rudbar-e Shahrestan District) in Qazvin County, Qazvin province, Iran.

== Demographics ==
=== Population ===
At the time of the 2006 National Census, the village's population was 814 in 194 households. The following census in 2011 counted 280 people in 216 households. The 2016 census measured the population of the village as 331 people in 112 households.
