= Dastjordeh =

Dastjordeh (Persian: دستجرده) may refer to:

- Dastjordeh-ye Olya
- Dastjordeh-ye Sofla

== See also ==
- Dastjerdeh (disambiguation)
