= Azganin-e Olya =

Azganin-e Olya ازگنين عليا
- Village
- Location within Iran
- Coordinates: 36°30′34″N 50°22′50″E
- Country: Iran
- Province: Qazvin
- County: Qazvin
- Bakhsh: Alamut-e Gharbi
- Rural District: Rudbar-e Mohammad-e Zamani

Population (2006)
  - Total: 69
- Time zone: UTC+3:30 (IRST)
  - Summer (DST): UTC+4:30 (IRDT)

Azganin-e Olya (Persian: ازگنين عليا, also Romanized as Azganīn-e ‘Olyā; also known as Azganīn-e Bālā, Azganīn, Azgarīn, and Bāla Azgarin) is a village in Rudbar-e Mohammad-e Zamani Rural District, Alamut-e Gharbi District, Qazvin County, Qazvin Province, Iran. At the 2006 census, its population was 69, in 20 families.
