= Rajai Dasht =

Village in Qazvin province, Iran

Rajai Dasht Persian: رجائی دشت
- Village
- Location within Iran
- Coordinates: 36°27′38″N 50°17′06″E
- Country: Iran
- Province: Qazvin
- County: Qazvin
- District: Rudbar-e Alamut-e Gharbi
- Rural District: Rudbar-e Mohammad-e Zamani

Population (2016)
  - Total: 756
- Time zone: UTC+3:30 (IRST)

Rajai Dasht (Persian: رجائی دشت) (Note: Also romanized as Rajā'ī Dasht) is a village in, and the capital of, Rudbar-e Mohammad-e Zamani Rural District in Rudbar-e Alamut-e Gharbi District (Note: Formerly Rudbar-e Shahrestan District) of Qazvin County, Qazvin province, Iran.

== Demographics ==
=== Population ===
At the time of the 2006 National Census, the village's population was 648 in 177 households. The following census in 2011 counted 881 people in 225 households. The 2016 census measured the population of the village as 756 people in 215 households.
