= Simiyar =

Village in Qazvin province, Iran

Simiyar Persian: سيميار
- Village
- Location within Iran
- Coordinates: 36°22′47″N 50°18′52″E
- Country: Iran
- Province: Qazvin
- County: Qazvin
- District: Rudbar-e Alamut-e Gharbi
- Rural District: Rudbar-e Mohammad-e Zamani

Population (2016)
  - Total: 395
- Time zone: UTC+3:30 (IRST)

Simiyar (Persian: سيميار) (Note: Also known as Semīār) is a village in Rudbar-e Mohammad-e Zamani Rural District of Rudbar-e Alamut-e Gharbi District (Note: Formerly Rudbar-e Shahrestan District) in Qazvin County, Qazvin province, Iran.

== Demographics ==
=== Population ===
At the time of the 2006 National Census, the village's population was 119 in 47 households. The following census in 2011 counted 92 people in 43 households. The 2016 census measured the population of the village as 395 people in 151 households.
