= Gashnehrud =

Village in Qazvin province, Iran

Gashnehrud Persian: گشنه رود
- Village
- Location within Iran
- Coordinates: 36°34′49″N 49°55′13″E
- Country: Iran
- Province: Qazvin
- County: Qazvin
- District: Rudbar-e Alamut-e Gharbi
- Rural District: Dastjerd

Population (2016)
  - Total: 197
- Time zone: UTC+3:30 (IRST)

Gashnehrud (Persian: گشنه رود) (Note: Also romanized as Gashnerud and Gashnerūd) is a village in Dastjerd Rural District of Rudbar-e Alamut-e Gharbi District (Note: Formerly Rudbar-e Shahrestan District) in Qazvin County, Qazvin province, Iran.

== Demographics ==
=== Population ===
At the time of the 2006 National Census, the village's population was 102 in 21 households. The following census in 2011 counted 103 people in 33 households. The 2016 census measured the population of the village as 197 people in 64 households.
