= Parchkuh =

Village in Qazvin province, Iran

Parchkuh Persian: پرچكوه
- Village
- Location within Iran
- Coordinates: 36°37′55″N 50°10′21″E
- Country: Iran
- Province: Qazvin
- County: Qazvin
- District: Rudbar-e Alamut-e Gharbi
- Rural District: Rudbar-e Shahrestan

Population (2016)
  - Total: 314
- Time zone: UTC+3:30 (IRST)

Parchkuh (Persian: پرچكوه) (Note: Also romanized as Parchkūh; also known as Parchahkūh) is a village in Rudbar-e Shahrestan Rural District of Rudbar-e Alamut-e Gharbi District (Note: Formerly Rudbar-e Shahrestan District) in Qazvin County, Qazvin province, Iran.

== Demographics ==
=== Population ===
At the time of the 2006 National Census, the village's population was 300 in 80 households. The following census in 2011 counted 210 people in 64 households. The 2016 census measured the population of the village as 314 people in 106 households.
