= Shahrestan-e Sofla =

Village in Qazvin province, Iran

Shahrestan-e Sofla Persian: شهرستان سفلي
- Village
- Location within Iran
- Coordinates: 36°31′34″N 50°12′07″E
- Country: Iran
- Province: Qazvin
- County: Qazvin
- District: Rudbar-e Alamut-e Gharbi
- Rural District: Rudbar-e Shahrestan

Population (2016)
  - Total: 489
- Time zone: UTC+3:30 (IRST)

Shahrestan-e Sofla (Persian: شهرستان سفلي) (Note: Also romanized as Shahrestān-e Soflá; also known as Shahrestān-e Pā’īn) is a village in Rudbar-e Shahrestan Rural District of Rudbar-e Alamut-e Gharbi District (Note: Formerly Rudbar-e Shahrestan District) in Qazvin County, Qazvin province, Iran.

== Demographics ==
=== Population ===
At the time of the 2006 National Census, the village's population was 515 in 120 households. The following census in 2011 counted 351 people in 108 households. The 2016 census measured the population of the village as 489 people in 157 households.
