= Azganin =

Azganin (Persian: ازگنين) may refer to:

- Azganin-e Olya
- Azganin-e Sofla
