= Katekan =

Katekan may refer to the following places:

- Katekan, Iran
- Katekan, Indonesia

== See also ==
- Katakana
