= Ya Rud =

Village in Qazvin province, Iran

Ya Rud Persian: يارود
- Village
- Location within Iran
- Coordinates: 36°32′32″N 50°20′16″E
- Country: Iran
- Province: Qazvin
- County: Qazvin
- District: Rudbar-e Alamut-e Gharbi
- Rural District: Rudbar-e Mohammad-e Zamani

Population (2016)
  - Total: 790
- Time zone: UTC+3:30 (IRST)

Ya Rud (Persian: يارود) (Note: Also romanized as Yā Rūd) is a village in Rudbar-e Mohammad-e Zamani Rural District of Rudbar-e Alamut-e Gharbi District (Note: Formerly Rudbar-e Shahrestan District) in Qazvin County, Qazvin province, Iran.

== Demographics ==
=== Population ===
At the time of the 2006 National Census, the village's population was 642 in 167 households. The following census in 2011 counted 464 people in 142 households. The 2016 census measured the population of the village as 790 people in 248 households. It was the most populous village in its rural district.
