= Safarin =

Village in Qazvin province, Iran

Safarin Persian: صفرين
- Village
- Location within Iran
- Coordinates: 36°29′44″N 50°18′24″E
- Country: Iran
- Province: Qazvin
- County: Qazvin
- District: Rudbar-e Alamut-e Gharbi
- Rural District: Rudbar-e Mohammad-e Zamani

Population (2016)
  - Total: 339
- Time zone: UTC+3:30 (IRST)

Safarin (Persian: صفرين) (Note: Also romanized as Safarīn) is a village in Rudbar-e Mohammad-e Zamani Rural District of Rudbar-e Alamut-e Gharbi District (Note: Formerly Rudbar-e Shahrestan District) in Qazvin County, Qazvin province, Iran.

== Demographics ==
=== Population ===
At the time of the 2006 National Census, the village's population was 253 in 64 households. The following census in 2011 counted 292 people in 87 households. The 2016 census measured the population of the village as 339 people in 114 households.
