= Tahmursabad =

Village in Qazvin province, Iran

Tahmursabad Persian: طهمورث اباد
- Village
- Location within Iran
- Coordinates: 36°34′03″N 49°58′14″E
- Country: Iran
- Province: Qazvin
- County: Qazvin
- District: Rudbar-e Alamut-e Gharbi
- Rural District: Dastjerd

Population (2016)
  - Total: 179
- Time zone: UTC+3:30 (IRST)

Tahmursabad (Persian: طهمورث اباد) (Note: Also romanized as Ţahmūrs̱ābād; also known as Ţahmāsebābād) is a village in Dastjerd Rural District of Rudbar-e Alamut-e Gharbi District (Note: Formerly Rudbar-e Shahrestan District) in Qazvin County, Qazvin province, Iran.

== Demographics ==
=== Population ===
At the time of the 2006 National Census, the village's population was 50 in 13 households. The following census in 2011 counted 29 people in 10 households. The 2016 census measured the population of the village as 179 people in 61 households.
