= Tanureh =

Village in Qazvin province, Iran

Tanureh Persian: تنوره
- Village
- Location within Iran
- Coordinates: 36°22′44″N 50°20′10″E
- Country: Iran
- Province: Qazvin
- County: Qazvin
- District: Rudbar-e Alamut-e Gharbi
- Rural District: Rudbar-e Mohammad-e Zamani

Population (2016)
  - Total: 326
- Time zone: UTC+3:30 (IRST)

Tanureh (Persian: تنوره) (Note: Also romanized as Tanūreh) is a village in Rudbar-e Mohammad-e Zamani Rural District of Rudbar-e Alamut-e Gharbi District (Note: Formerly Rudbar-e Shahrestan District) in Qazvin County, Qazvin province, Iran.

== Demographics ==
=== Population ===
At the time of the 2006 National Census, the village's population was 130 in 49 households. The following census in 2011 counted 21 people in eight households. The 2016 census measured the population of the village as 326 people in 112 households.
