= Balakan, Qazvin =

Village in Qazvin province, Iran

Balakan Persian: بلكان
- Village
- Location within Iran
- Coordinates: 36°31′46″N 50°04′26″E
- Country: Iran
- Province: Qazvin
- County: Qazvin
- District: Rudbar-e Alamut-e Gharbi
- Rural District: Dastjerd

Population (2016)
  - Total: 163
- Time zone: UTC+3:30 (IRST)

Balakan (Persian: بلكان) (Note: Also romanized as Balakān; also known as Balūkān) is a village in Dastjerd Rural District of Rudbar-e Alamut-e Gharbi District (Note: Formerly Rudbar-e Shahrestan District) in Qazvin County, Qazvin province, Iran.

== Demographics ==
=== Population ===
At the time of the 2006 National Census, the village's population was 72 in 26 households. The following census in 2011 counted 171 people in 55 households. The 2016 census measured the population of the village as 163 people in 64 households.
