= Kakuhestan =

Village in Qazvin province, Iran

Kakuhestan Persian: كاكوهستان
- Village
- Location within Iran
- Coordinates: 36°33′32″N 49°58′36″E
- Country: Iran
- Province: Qazvin
- County: Qazvin
- District: Rudbar-e Alamut-e Gharbi
- Rural District: Dastjerd

Population (2016)
  - Total: 313
- Time zone: UTC+3:30 (IRST)

Kakuhestan (Persian: كاكوهستان) (Note: Also romanized as Kākūhestān; also known as Kakostan) is a village in Dastjerd Rural District of Rudbar-e Alamut-e Gharbi District (Note: Formerly Rudbar-e Shahrestan District) in Qazvin County, Qazvin province, Iran.

== Demographics ==
=== Population ===
At the time of the 2006 National Census, the village's population was 259 in 51 households. The following census in 2011 counted 309 people in 77 households. The 2016 census measured the population of the village as 313 people in 88 households.
