= Shotorak =

Shotorak (Persian: شترك) may refer to:

- Shotorak, Qazvin
- Shotorak, Razavi Khorasan
- Shotorak monastery in Afghanistan
