= Lat, Qazvin =

Village in Qazvin province, Iran

Lat Persian: لات
- Village
- Location within Iran
- Coordinates: 36°36′41″N 50°04′04″E
- Country: Iran
- Province: Qazvin
- County: Qazvin
- District: Rudbar-e Alamut-e Gharbi
- Rural District: Dastjerd

Population (2016)
  - Total: 385
- Time zone: UTC+3:30 (IRST)

Lat (Persian: لات) (Note: Also romanized as Lāt) is a village in Dastjerd Rural District of Rudbar-e Alamut-e Gharbi District (Note: Formerly Rudbar-e Shahrestan District) in Qazvin County, Qazvin province, Iran.

== Demographics ==
=== Population ===
At the time of the 2006 National Census, the village's population was 300 in 89 households. The following census in 2011 counted 216 people in 82 households. The 2016 census measured the population of the village as 385 people in 149 households.
