= Dastjerdeh =

Dastjerdeh or Dast Jerdeh (Persian: دستجرده) may refer to:

- Dastjerdeh, Isfahan
- Dastjerdeh, Kermanshah
- Dastjerdeh, Ashtian, Markazi Province
- Dastjerdeh, Shazand, Markazi Province
- Dast Jerdeh, Zanjan
- Dast Jerdeh Rural District, in Zanjan Province

== See also ==
- Dastjordeh (disambiguation)
