= Katekan, Iran =

Village in Qazvin province, Iran

Katekan Persian: كتكان
- Village
- Location within Iran
- Coordinates: 36°28′55″N 50°14′59″E
- Country: Iran
- Province: Qazvin
- County: Qazvin
- District: Rudbar-e Alamut-e Gharbi
- Rural District: Rudbar-e Mohammad-e Zamani

Population (2016)
  - Total: 352
- Time zone: UTC+3:30 (IRST)

Katekan (Persian: كتكان) (Note: Also romanized as Katekān; also known as Kategān) is a village in Rudbar-e Mohammad-e Zamani Rural District of Rudbar-e Alamut-e Gharbi District (Note: Formerly Rudbar-e Shahrestan District) in Qazvin County, Qazvin province, Iran.

== Demographics ==
=== Population ===
At the time of the 2006 National Census, the village's population was 160 in 48 households. The following census in 2011 counted 118 people in 41 households. The 2016 census measured the population of the village as 352 people in 108 households.
