= Ghazazan =

Village in Semnan province, Iran

Ghazazan Persian: غزازان
- Village
- Location within Iran
- Coordinates: 36°08′52″N 56°01′43″E
- Country: Iran
- Province: Semnan
- County: Shahrud
- District: Beyarjomand
- Rural District: Beyarjomand

Population (2016)
  - Total: 386
- Time zone: UTC+3:30 (IRST)

Ghazazan (Persian: غزازان) (Note: Also romanized as Ghazāzān and Ghazzāzān; also known as Kazāzān and Kazzāzān) is a village in Beyarjomand Rural District of Beyarjomand District in Shahrud County, Semnan province, Iran.

== Demographics ==
=== Population ===
At the time of the 2006 National Census, the village's population was 368 in 112 households. The following census in 2011 counted 222 people in 82 households. The 2016 census measured the population of the village as 386 people in 135 households.
