= Razmian =

City in Qazvin province, Iran

Razmian Persian: رازميان
- City
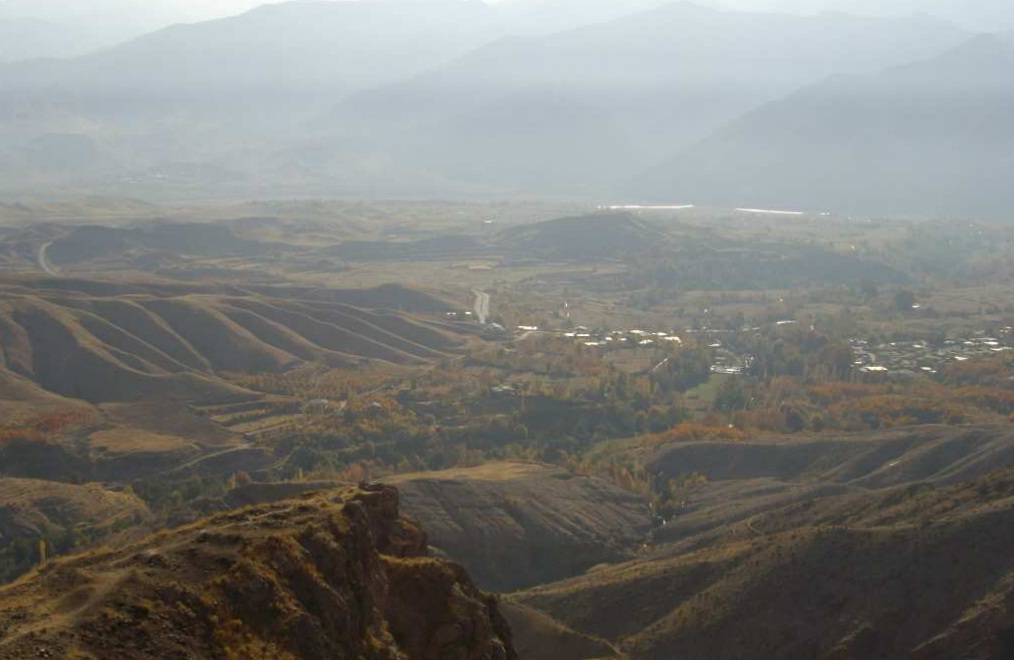
- Lambsar Castle near Razmian

- Location within Iran
- Coordinates: 36°32′29″N 50°12′39″E
- Country: Iran
- Province: Qazvin
- County: Qazvin
- District: Rudbar-e Alamut-e Gharbi

Population (2016)
  - Total: 1,253
- Time zone: UTC+3:30 (IRST)

Razmian (Persian: رازميان) (Note: Also romanized as Rāzmīān) is a city in, and the capital of, Rudbar-e Alamut-e Gharbi District (Note: Formerly Rudbar-e Shahrestan District) of Qazvin County, Qazvin province, Iran.

== Demographics ==
=== Language and ethnicity ===
People of Razmian are Tat and they speak the Tati language.

=== Population ===
At the time of the 2006 National Census, the city's population was 965 in 284 households. The following census in 2011 counted 1,164 people in 305 households. The 2016 census measured the population of the city as 1,253 people in 405 households.

== Lambsar Castle ==
Lambsar Castle is one of the largest and the most fortified and unconquerable castles of the Ismailis (Assassin) in Iran, is about 5 km from Razmian.
