= Qaleh-ye Ahmad =

Village in Semnan province, Iran

Qaleh-ye Ahmad Persian: قلعه احمد
- Village
- Location within Iran
- Coordinates: 36°00′07″N 55°59′05″E
- Country: Iran
- Province: Semnan
- County: Shahrud
- District: Beyarjomand
- Rural District: Beyarjomand

Population (2016)
  - Total: 85
- Time zone: UTC+3:30 (IRST)

Qaleh-ye Ahmad (Persian: قلعه احمد) (Note: Also romanized as Qal‘eh-ye Aḩmad) is a village in Beyarjomand Rural District of Beyarjomand District in Shahrud County, Semnan province, Iran.

== Demographics ==
=== Population ===
At the time of the 2006 National Census, the village's population was 56 in 19 households. The following census in 2011 counted 57 people in 23 households. The 2016 census measured the population of the village as 85 people in 37 households.
