= Beyarjomand Rural District =

Rural district in Semnan province, Iran

Beyarjomand Rural District Persian: دهستان بيارجمند
- Rural District
- Location within Iran
- Coordinates: 35°19′N 55°58′E
- Country: Iran
- Province: Semnan
- County: Shahrud
- District: Beyarjomand
- Established: 1987
- Capital: Khan Khvodi

Population (2016)
  - Total: 2,018
- Time zone: UTC+3:30 (IRST)

Beyarjomand Rural District (Persian: دهستان بيارجمند) is in Beyarjomand District of Shahrud County, Semnan province, Iran. Its capital is the village of Khan Khvodi. The rural district was previously administered from the city of Beyarjomand.

== Demographics ==
=== Population ===
At the time of the 2006 National Census, the rural district's population was 2,023 in 737 households. There were 1,643 inhabitants in 655 households at the following census of 2011. The 2016 census measured the population of the rural district as 2,018 in 819 households. The most populous of its 57 villages was Qaleh-ye Bala, with 412 people.

=== Other villages in the rural district ===
- Dastjerd
- Dezian
- Ghazazan
- Givar
- Qaleh-ye Ahmad
- Yazdu
