= Dastjerd-e Sofla, Qazvin =

Village in Qazvin province, Iran

Dastjerd-e Sofla Persian: دستجرد سفلي
- Village
- Location within Iran
- Coordinates: 36°33′57″N 50°01′44″E
- Country: Iran
- Province: Qazvin
- County: Qazvin
- District: Rudbar-e Alamut-e Gharbi
- Rural District: Dastjerd

Population (2016)
  - Total: 428
- Time zone: UTC+3:30 (IRST)

Dastjerd-e Sofla (Persian: دستجردسفلي) (Note: Also romanized as Dastjerd-e Soflá) is a village in, and the capital of, Dastjerd Rural District in Rudbar-e Alamut-e Gharbi District (Note: Formerly Rudbar-e Shahrestan District) of Qazvin County, Qazvin province, Iran.

== Demographics ==
=== Population ===
At the time of the 2006 National Census, the village's population was 95 in 36 households. The following census in 2011 counted 271 people in 99 households. The 2016 census measured the population of the village as 428 people in 162 households. It was the most populous village in its rural district.
