= Yazdu =

Village in Semnan province, Iran

Yazdu Persian: يزدو
- Village
- Location within Iran
- Coordinates: 36°00′51″N 56°01′55″E
- Country: Iran
- Province: Semnan
- County: Shahrud
- District: Beyarjomand
- Rural District: Beyarjomand

Population (2016)
  - Total: 66
- Time zone: UTC+3:30 (IRST)

Yazdu (Persian: يزدو) (Note: Also romanized as Yazdū) is a village in Beyarjomand Rural District of Beyarjomand District in Shahrud County, Semnan province, Iran.

== Demographics ==
=== Population ===
At the time of the 2006 National Census, the village's population was 71 in 23 households. The following census in 2011 counted 40 people in 14 households. The 2016 census measured the population of the village as 66 people in 29 households.
