= Dezian =

Village in Semnan province, Iran

Dezian Persian: دزيان
- Village
- Location within Iran
- Coordinates: 36°00′05″N 55°59′21″E
- Country: Iran
- Province: Semnan
- County: Shahrud
- District: Beyarjomand
- Rural District: Beyarjomand

Population (2016)
  - Total: 292
- Time zone: UTC+3:30 (IRST)

Dezian (Persian: دزيان) (Note: Also romanized as Dezīān) is a village in Beyarjomand Rural District of Beyarjomand District in Shahrud County, Semnan province, Iran.

== Demographics ==
=== Population ===
At the time of the 2006 National Census, the village's population was 200 in 87 households. The following census in 2011 counted 184 people in 81 households. The 2016 census measured the population of the village as 292 people in 114 households.
