= Beyarjomand =

City in Semnan province, Iran

Beyarjomand Persian: بيارجمند
- City
- Location within Iran
- Coordinates: 36°04′51″N 55°48′16″E
- Country: Iran
- Province: Semnan
- County: Shahrud
- District: Beyarjomand
- Established as a city: 1993

Population (2016)
  - Total: 2,528
- Time zone: UTC+3:30 (IRST)

Beyarjomand (Persian: بيارجمند) (Note: Also romanized as Beyārjomand, Bīārjmand, Bīārjomand, and Bīyārjomand; also known as Beyār) is a city in, and the capital of, Beyarjomand District in Shahrud County, Semnan province, Iran. It was the administrative center for Beyarjomand Rural District until its capital was transferred to the village of Khan Khvodi. The village of Beyarjomand was converted to a city in 1993.

== Demographics ==
=== Population ===
At the time of the 2006 National Census, the city's population was 2,246 in 706 households. The following census in 2011 counted 2,441 people in 734 households. The 2016 census measured the population of the city as 2,528 people in 846 households.

== Climate ==
Beyarjomand has a cold desert climate (BWk).

Climate data for Biarjamand, Semnan Province, Altitude: 1099.3 M from: 1992-2010
Month	Jan	Feb	Mar	Apr	May	Jun	Jul	Aug	Sep	Oct	Nov	Dec	Year
Mean daily maximum °C (°F)	7.6 (45.7)	11.2 (52.2)	16.7 (62.1)	23.3 (73.9)	28.6 (83.5)	33.5 (92.3)	35.6 (96.1)	34.7 (94.5)	30.7 (87.3)	24.5 (76.1)	16.3 (61.3)	9.6 (49.3)	22.7 (72.9)
Daily mean °C (°F)	2.2 (36.0)	5.0 (41.0)	10.1 (50.2)	16.5 (61.7)	21.7 (71.1)	26.7 (80.1)	29.3 (84.7)	28.0 (82.4)	23.3 (73.9)	17.0 (62.6)	9.6 (49.3)	4.1 (39.4)	16.1 (61.0)
Mean daily minimum °C (°F)	−3.2 (26.2)	−1.1 (30.0)	3.4 (38.1)	9.7 (49.5)	14.9 (58.8)	20.0 (68.0)	22.9 (73.2)	21.4 (70.5)	16.0 (60.8)	9.4 (48.9)	2.9 (37.2)	−1.5 (29.3)	9.6 (49.2)
Average precipitation mm (inches)	15.4 (0.61)	13.2 (0.52)	28.2 (1.11)	23.7 (0.93)	15.4 (0.61)	4.3 (0.17)	0.6 (0.02)	1.3 (0.05)	2.0 (0.08)	3.1 (0.12)	7.2 (0.28)	13.1 (0.52)	127.5 (5.02)
Average relative humidity (%)	66	57	49	43	35	30	30	30	33	39	50	66	44
