= Khan Khvodi =

Village in Semnan province, Iran

Khan Khvodi Persian: خانخودي
- Village
- Location within Iran
- Coordinates: 36°01′27″N 55°59′03″E
- Country: Iran
- Province: Semnan
- County: Shahrud
- District: Beyarjomand
- Rural District: Beyarjomand

Population (2016)
  - Total: 357
- Time zone: UTC+3:30 (IRST)

Khan Khvodi (Persian: خانخودي) (Note: Also romanized as Khān Khvodī, Khān-i-Khūdi, and Khānkhowdī; also known as Khān Khodrī, Khāneh Khodī, Khaneh Khoori, and Khāneh Khvodī) is a village in, and the capital of, Beyarjomand Rural District in Beyarjomand District of Shahrud County, Semnan province, Iran. The rural district was previously administered from the city of Beyarjomand.

== Demographics ==
=== Population ===
At the time of the 2006 National Census, the village's population was 394 in 150 households. The following census in 2011 counted 339 people in 135 households. The 2016 census measured the population of the village as 357 people in 147 households.
