= Qaleh-ye Bala, Semnan =

Village in Semnan province, Iran

Qaleh-ye Bala Persian: قلعه بالا
- Village
- Location within Iran
- Coordinates: 36°00′05″N 56°00′06″E
- Country: Iran
- Province: Semnan
- County: Shahrud
- District: Beyarjomand
- Rural District: Beyarjomand

Population (2016)
  - Total: 412
- Time zone: UTC+3:30 (IRST)

Qaleh-ye Bala (Persian: قلعه بالا) (Note: Also romanized as Qal‘eh Bālā and Qal‘eh-ye Bālā) is a village in Beyarjomand Rural District of Beyarjomand District in Shahrud County, Semnan province, Iran.

== Demographics ==
=== Population ===
At the time of the 2006 National Census, the village's population was 397 in 139 households. The following census in 2011 counted 385 people in 150 households. The 2016 census measured the population of the village as 412 people in 176 households, the most populous in its rural district.
