= Givar =

Village in Semnan province, Iran

Givar Persian: گيور
- Village
- Location within Iran
- Coordinates: 36°00′17″N 55°59′34″E
- Country: Iran
- Province: Semnan
- County: Shahrud
- District: Beyarjomand
- Rural District: Beyarjomand

Population (2016)
  - Total: 118
- Time zone: UTC+3:30 (IRST)

Givar (Persian: گيور) (Note: Also romanized as Gīvar; also known as Gabār, Gīār, and Kābār) is a village in Beyarjomand Rural District of Beyarjomand District in Shahrud County, Semnan province, Iran.

== Demographics ==
=== Population ===
At the time of the 2006 National Census, the village's population was 120 in 50 households. The following census in 2011 counted 108 people in 47 households. The 2016 census measured the population of the village as 118 people in 53 households.
