= Dastjerd, Natanz =

Dastjerd دستجرد
- Village
- Location within Iran
- Coordinates: 33°32′42″N 51°58′16″E
- Country: Iran
- Province: Isfahan
- County: Natanz
- Bakhsh: Central
- Rural District: Karkas

Population (2006)
  - Total: 71
- Time zone: UTC+3:30 (IRST)
  - Summer (DST): UTC+4:30 (IRDT)

Dastjerd (Persian: دستجرد; also known as Dastgerd and Dastgird) is a village in Karkas Rural District, in the Central District of Natanz County, Isfahan Province, Iran. As of the 2006 census, its population was 71, composed of 43 families.
