= Dastjerd, Semnan =

Village in Semnan province, Iran

Dastjerd Persian: دستجرد
- Village
- Location within Iran
- Coordinates: 36°08′30″N 56°05′38″E
- Country: Iran
- Province: Semnan
- County: Shahrud
- District: Beyarjomand
- Rural District: Beyarjomand

Population (2016)
  - Total: 296
- Time zone: UTC+3:30 (IRST)

Dastjerd (Persian: دستجرد) (Note: Also known as Dastgerd and Dast-i-Gird) is a village in Beyarjomand Rural District of Beyarjomand District in Shahrud County, Semnan province, Iran.

== Demographics ==
=== Population ===
At the time of the 2006 National Census, the village's population was 409 in 153 households. The following census in 2011 counted 308 people in 123 households. The 2016 census measured the population of the village as 296 people in 126 households.
