= Dastgerd, Mud =

Dastgerd دستجرد
- Village
- Location within Iran
- Coordinates: 32°50′00″N 59°45′00″E
- Country: Iran
- Province: South Khorasan
- County: Sarbisheh
- Bakhsh: Mud
- Rural District: Mud

Population (2006)
  - Total: 110
- Time zone: UTC+3:30 (IRST)
  - Summer (DST): UTC+4:30 (IRDT)

Dastgerd (Persian: دستجرد, also Romanized as Dastjerd; also known as Dastgerd-e Bālā) is a village in Mud Rural District, Mud District, Sarbisheh County, South Khorasan Province, Iran. According to the 2006 census, it had a population of 110 in 40 families.
