= Dastjerd-e Sofla, Kerman =

Dastjerd-e Sofla دستجردسفلي
- Village
- Location within Iran
- Coordinates: 27°32′03″N 57°51′12″E
- Country: Iran
- Province: Kerman
- County: Qaleh Ganj
- Bakhsh: Central
- Rural District: Qaleh Ganj

Population (2006)
  - Total: 55
- Time zone: UTC+3:30 (IRST)
  - Summer (DST): UTC+4:30 (IRDT)

Dastjerd-e Sofla (Persian: دستجردسفلي, also Romanized as Dastjerd-e Soflá and Dastgerd-e Soflá) is a village in Qaleh Ganj Rural District, in the Central District of Qaleh Ganj County, Kerman Province, Iran. At the 2006 census, its population was 55, in 17 families.
