= Dastgerd-e Dargaz =

Dastgerd-e Dargaz دستگرددرگاز
- Village
- Location within Iran
- Coordinates: 26°51′26″N 57°49′01″E
- Country: Iran
- Province: Hormozgan
- County: Bashagard
- Bakhsh: Gowharan
- Rural District: Gowharan

Population (2006)
  - Total: 487
- Time zone: UTC+3:30 (IRST)
  - Summer (DST): UTC+4:30 (IRDT)

Dastgerd-e Dargaz (Persian: دستگرددرگاز, also Romanized as Dastgerd-e Dargāz) is a village in Gowharan Rural District, Gowharan District, Bashagard County, Hormozgan Province, Iran. At the 2006 census, its population was 487, in 122 families.
