= Dastgerdan, Razavi Khorasan =

Dastgerdan دستگردان
- Village
- Location within Iran
- Coordinates: 36°15′25″N 59°44′41″E
- Country: Iran
- Province: Razavi Khorasan
- County: Mashhad
- Bakhsh: Central
- Rural District: Kenevist

Population (2006)
  - Total: 406
- Time zone: UTC+3:30 (IRST)
  - Summer (DST): UTC+4:30 (IRDT)

Dastgerdan (Persian: دستگردان, also Romanized as Dastgerdān) is a village in Kenevist Rural District, in the Central District of Mashhad County, Razavi Khorasan Province, Iran. At the 2006 census, its population was 406, in 95 families.
