= Dastgerd, Sarbisheh =

Dastgerd دستگرد
- Village
- Location within Iran
- Coordinates: 32°20′30″N 59°41′08″E
- Country: Iran
- Province: South Khorasan
- County: Sarbisheh
- Bakhsh: Central
- Rural District: Momenabad

Population (2006)
  - Total: 116
- Time zone: UTC+3:30 (IRST)
  - Summer (DST): UTC+4:30 (IRDT)

Dastgerd (Persian: دستگرد, also Romanized as Dastgerd and Dastgird; also known as Dasht Gerd) is a village in Momenabad Rural District, in the Central District of Sarbisheh County, South Khorasan Province, Iran. According to the 2006 census, it had a population of 116 in 30 families.
