= Katekan, Indonesia =

Katekan
- Location in Central Java and Indonesia Katekan (Indonesia)
- Coordinates: 7°16′20.3052″S 110°1′46.434″E
- Country: Indonesia
- Province: Central Java
- Regency: Temanggung Regency
- District: Ngadirejo District
- Elevation: 4,400 ft (1,341 m)

Population (2010)
  - Total: 4,930
- Time zone: UTC+7 (Western Indonesia Time)

Katekan is a village in Ngadirejo District, Temanggung Regency in Central Java Province. Its population is 4930.

== Climate ==
Katekan has a subtropical highland climate (Cfb). It has moderate to little rainfall from June to September and heavy to very heavy rainfall from October to May.

Climate data for Katekan
Month	Jan	Feb	Mar	Apr	May	Jun	Jul	Aug	Sep	Oct	Nov	Dec	Year
Mean daily maximum °C (°F)	22.3 (72.1)	22.6 (72.7)	22.9 (73.2)	23.0 (73.4)	23.1 (73.6)	23.3 (73.9)	23.0 (73.4)	23.2 (73.8)	23.6 (74.5)	23.8 (74.8)	23.5 (74.3)	22.8 (73.0)	23.1 (73.6)
Daily mean °C (°F)	18.3 (64.9)	18.5 (65.3)	18.7 (65.7)	18.8 (65.8)	18.5 (65.3)	18.5 (65.3)	18.0 (64.4)	17.9 (64.2)	18.5 (65.3)	19.0 (66.2)	19.1 (66.4)	18.5 (65.3)	18.5 (65.3)
Mean daily minimum °C (°F)	14.3 (57.7)	14.4 (57.9)	14.6 (58.3)	14.7 (58.5)	14.6 (58.3)	13.8 (56.8)	13.0 (55.4)	12.7 (54.9)	13.5 (56.3)	14.3 (57.7)	14.7 (58.5)	14.3 (57.7)	14.1 (57.3)
Average precipitation mm (inches)	548 (21.6)	455 (17.9)	530 (20.9)	362 (14.3)	318 (12.5)	121 (4.8)	108 (4.3)	102 (4.0)	102 (4.0)	220 (8.7)	357 (14.1)	531 (20.9)	3,754 (148)
Source: Climate-Data.org
