= Dastgerd, Kohgiluyeh =

Dastgerd دستگرد
- Village
- Location within Iran
- Coordinates: 30°49′55″N 50°37′15″E
- Country: Iran
- Province: Kohgiluyeh and Boyer-Ahmad
- County: Kohgiluyeh
- Bakhsh: Central
- Rural District: Dehdasht-e Sharqi

Population (2006)
  - Total: 473
- Time zone: UTC+3:30 (IRST)
  - Summer (DST): UTC+4:30 (IRDT)

Dastgerd (Persian: دستگرد; also known as Dasht-e Khvord, Dasht-i-Khurd, and Dastjerd) is a village in Dehdasht-e Sharqi Rural District, in the Central District of Kohgiluyeh County, Kohgiluyeh and Boyer-Ahmad Province, Iran. At the 2006 census, its population was 473, in 85 families.
