= Dastjerd Rural District (Qazvin County) =

Rural district in Qazvin province, Iran

Dastjerd Rural District Persian: دهستان دستجرد
- Rural District
- Location within Iran
- Coordinates: 36°33′N 50°00′E
- Country: Iran
- Province: Qazvin
- County: Qazvin
- District: Rudbar-e Alamut-e Gharbi
- Established: 1991
- Capital: Dastjerd-e Sofla

Population (2016)
  - Total: 2,704
- Time zone: UTC+3:30 (IRST)

Dastjerd Rural District (Persian: دهستان دستجرد) is in Rudbar-e Alamut-e Gharbi District (Note: Formerly Rudbar-e Shahrestan District) of Qazvin County, Qazvin province, Iran. Its capital is the village of Dastjerd-e Sofla.

== Demographics ==
=== Population ===
At the time of the 2006 National Census, the rural district's population was 1,611 in 434 households. There were 1,881 inhabitants in 599 households at the following census of 2011. The 2016 census measured the population of the rural district as 2,704 in 965 households. The most populous of its 26 villages was Dastjerd-e Sofla, with 428 people.

=== Other villages in the rural district ===
- Balakan
- Gashnehrud
- Kakuhestan
- Khosrud
- Lat
- Tahmursabad
