= Shotorak monastery =

Ancient Buddhist site in Afghanistan

Shotorak
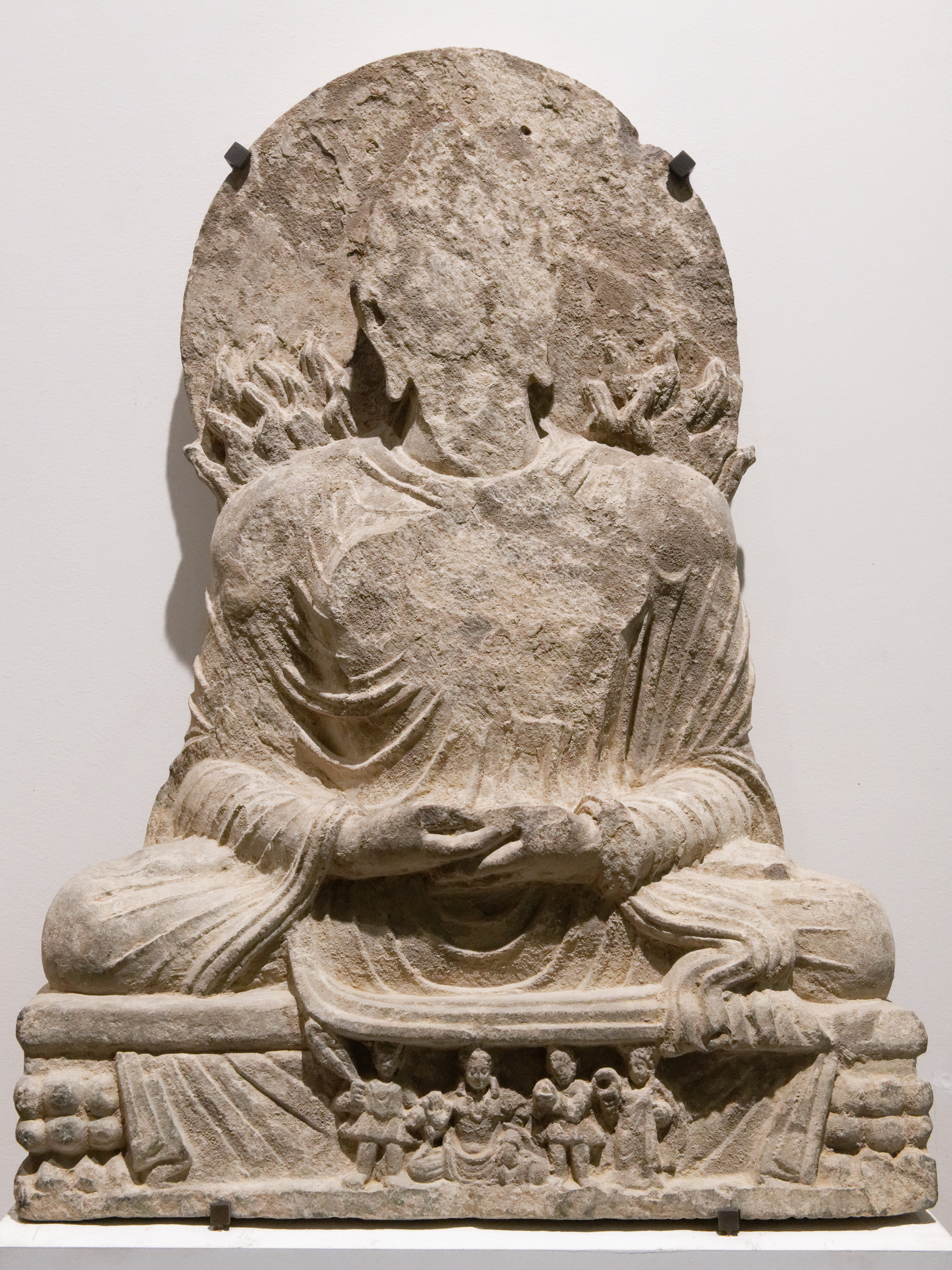
- Meditating Buddha, Shotorak, 2-3rd century CE.

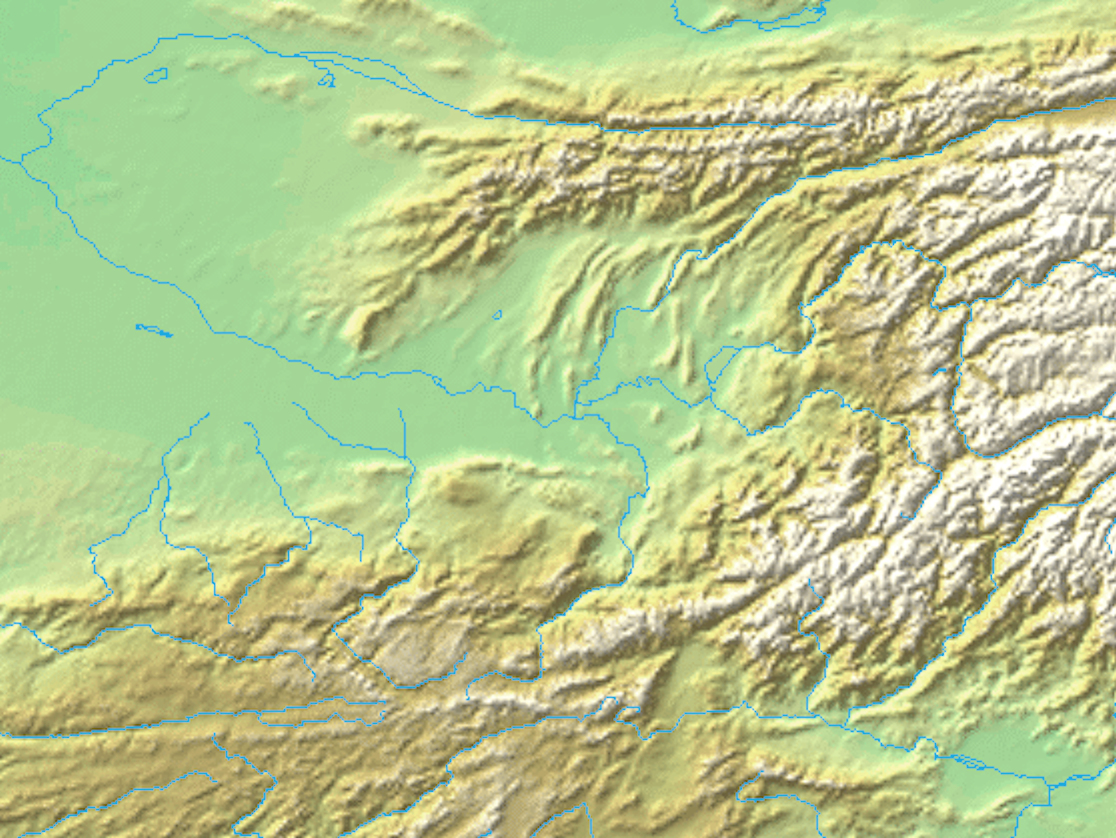
- Location within South Asia Location within Afghanistan Location within Bactria
- 34.930701°N 69.432950°E
- Type: Monastery

Shotorak monastery, at Kuh-i Pahlawan, Kapisa Province, is an ancient monastery located in modern Afghanistan. It was positioned together with Paitava monastery around the city of Kapisa, 40 km north of Kabul, which was the northern capital of the Kushan Empire. Beautiful sculptures of Buddhist donors in Kushan dress are known from this site.

Paitava, with Shorotak, have an artistic usage of representing the Buddha with fire emanating from the shoulders in the miracle of Sravasti, a feature also found on the effigies of Kushan kings on their coinage.

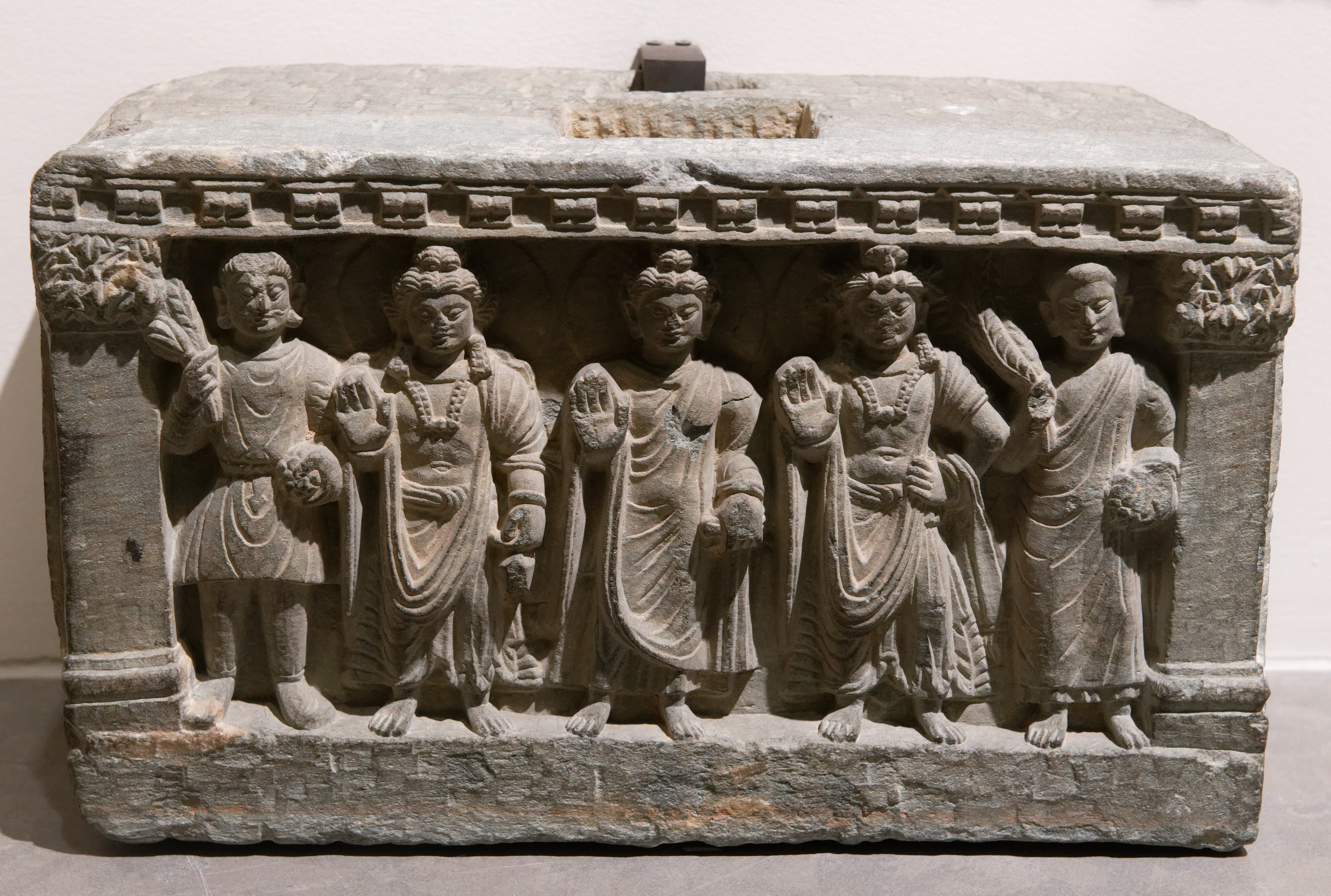
Shakyamuni and devotees.

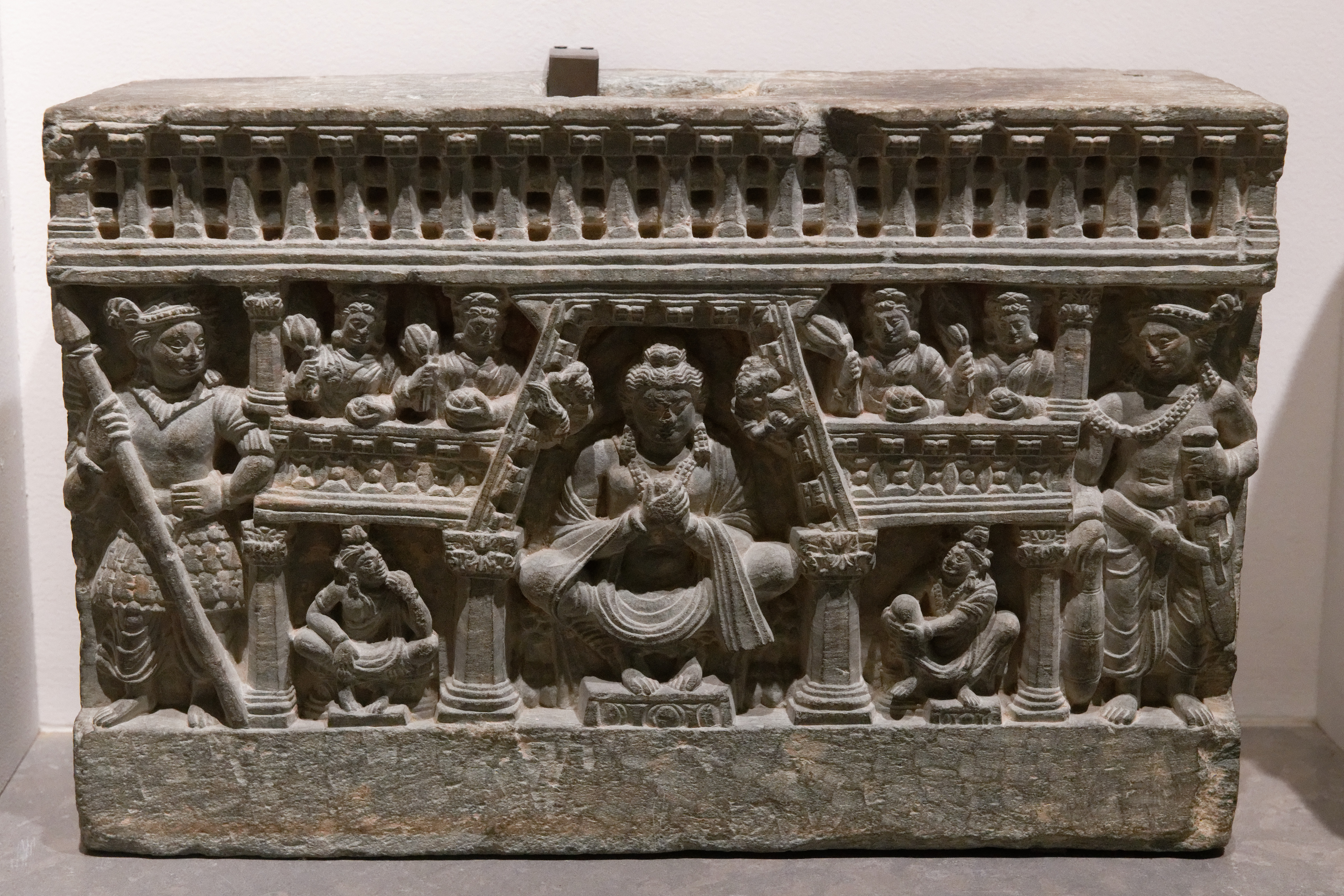
Maitreya's paradise, Shotorak, 2-3rd century CE.

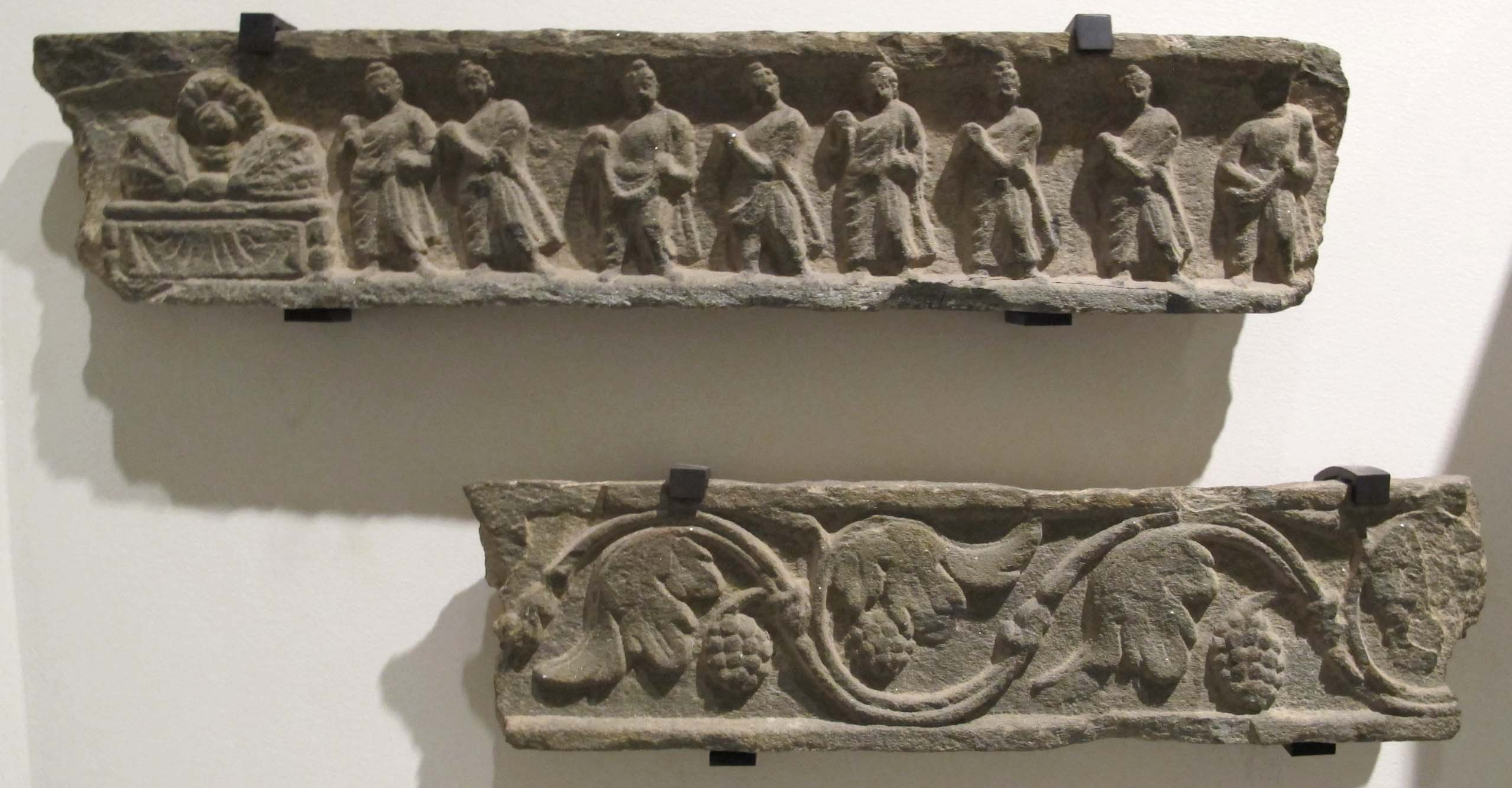

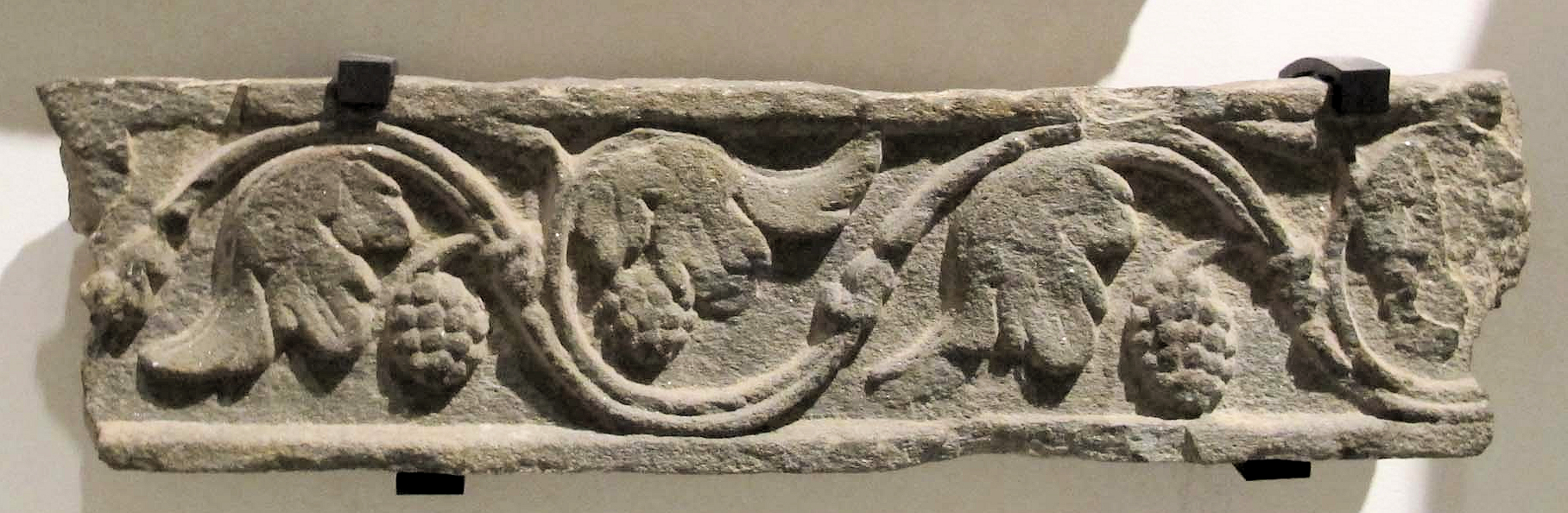
Gandhara vine-scroll from the Shotorak Monastery, 2nd-3rd century CE

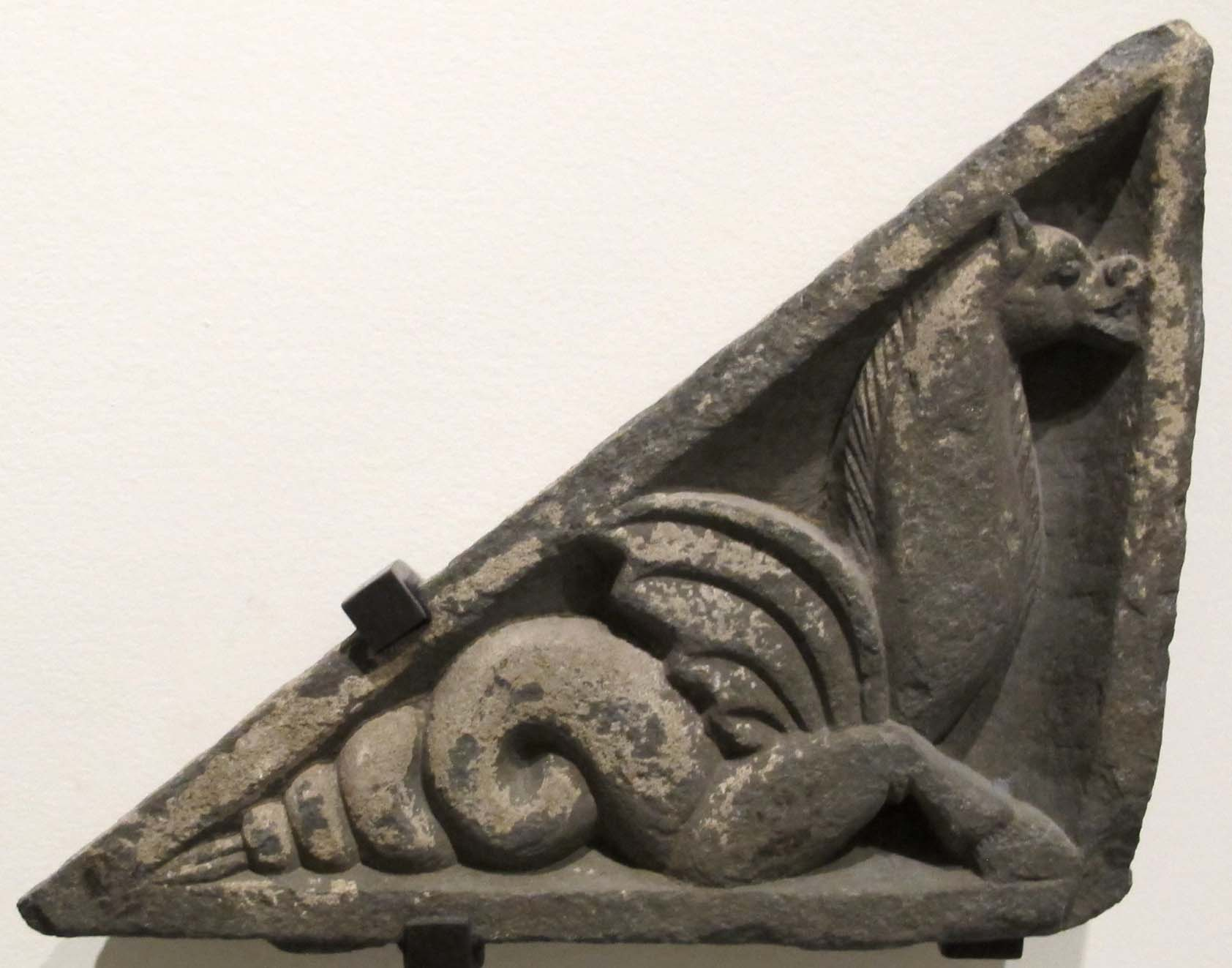

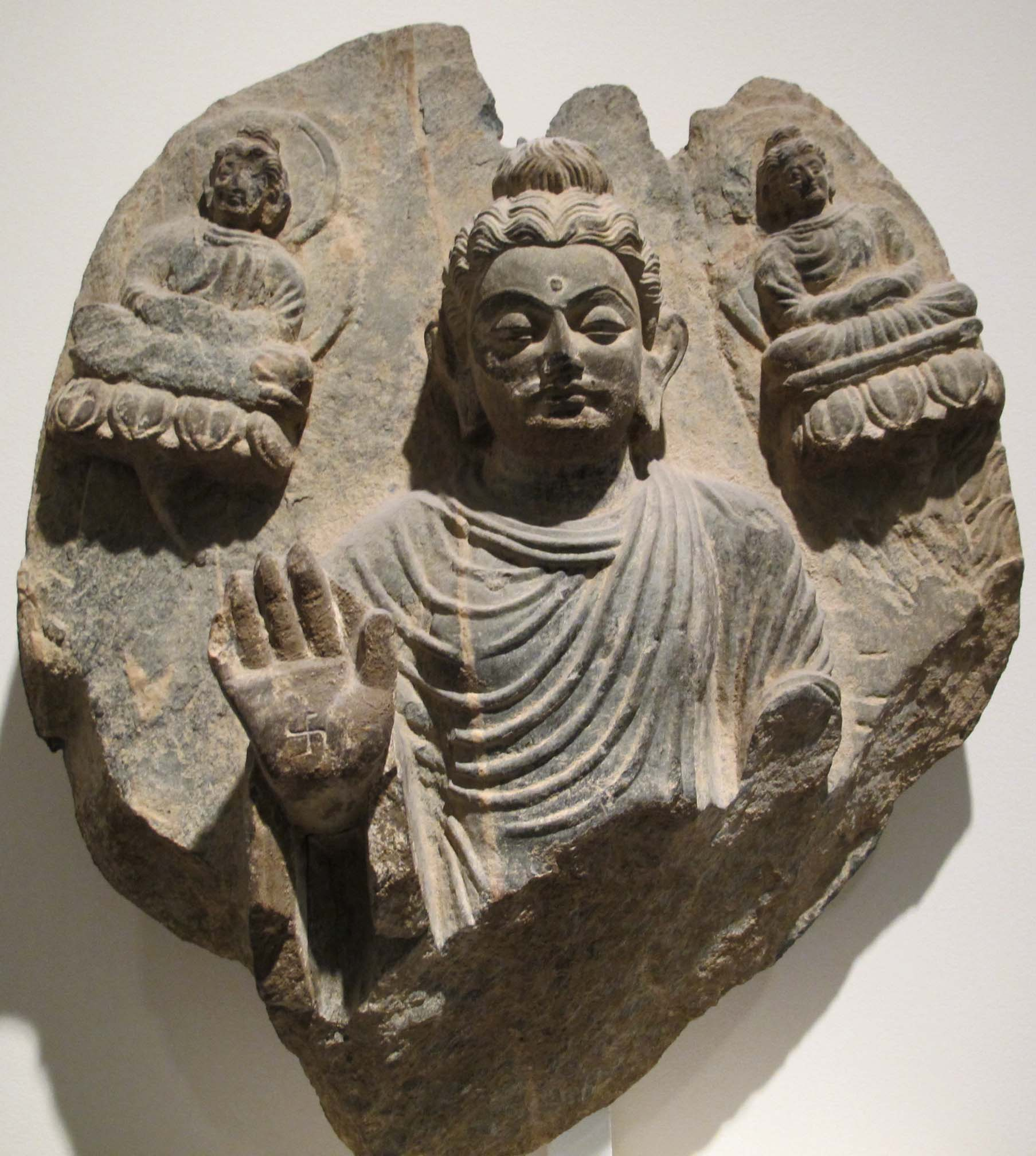

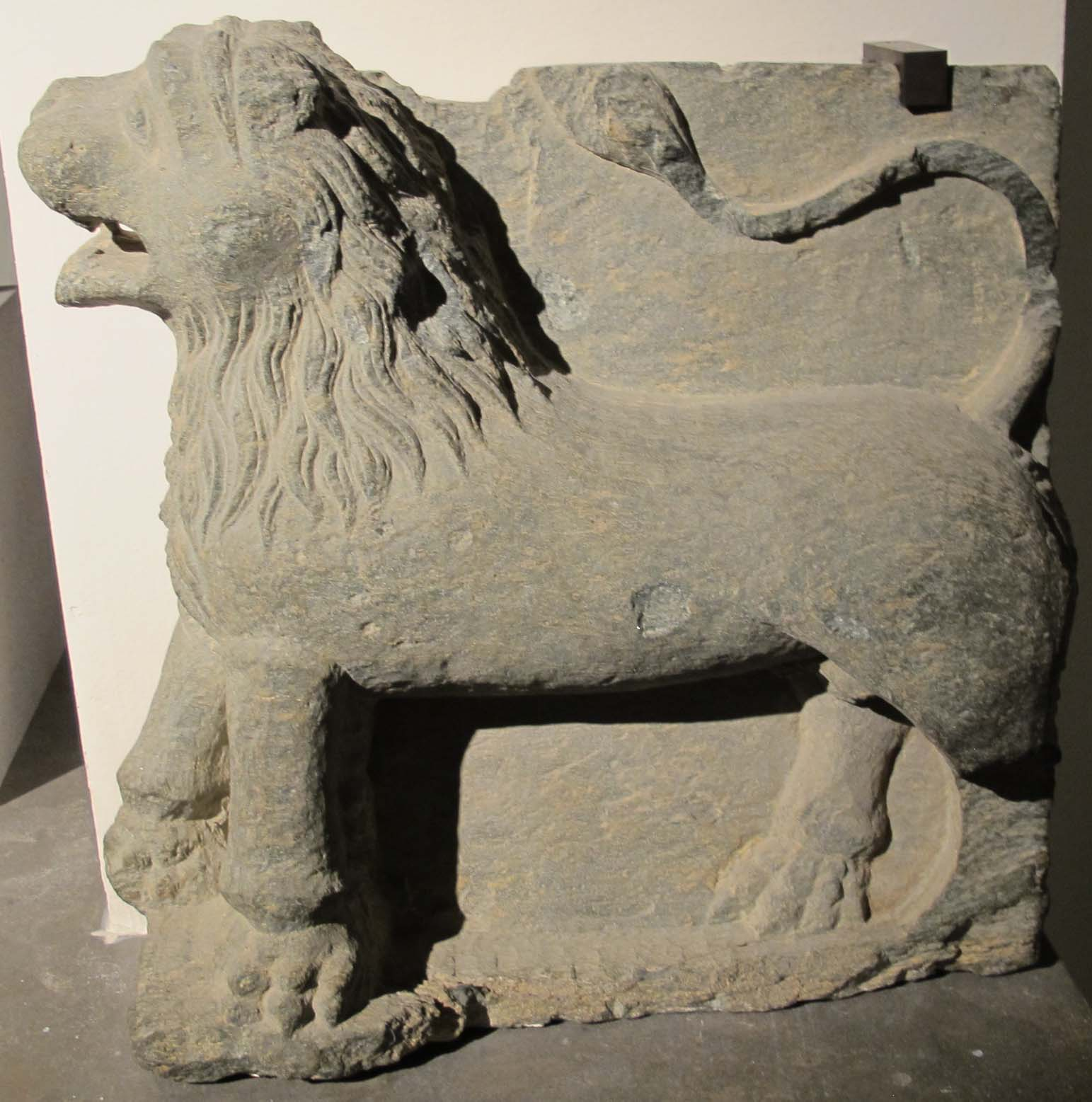

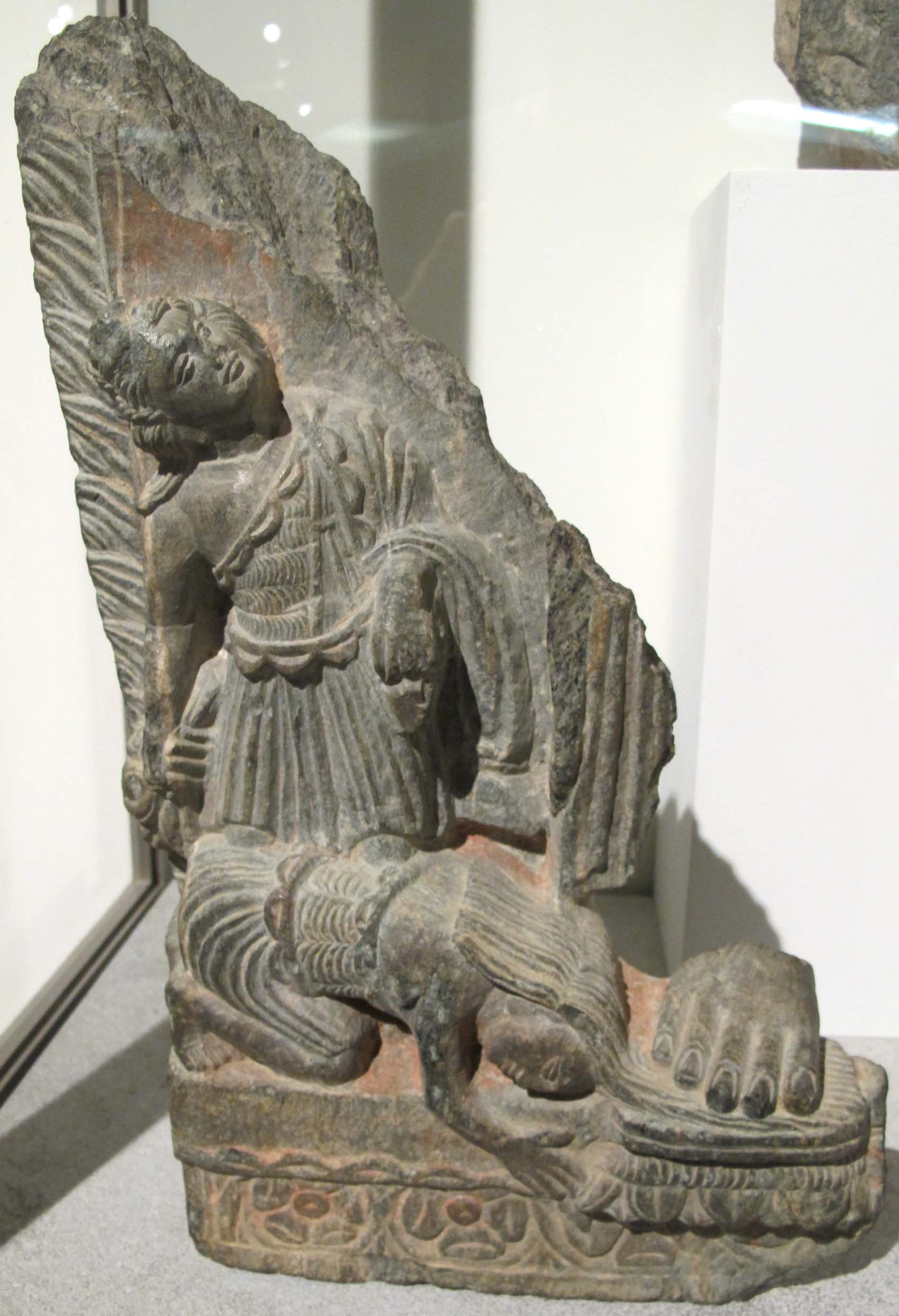
