= Dastjerd, Bardsir =

Dastjerd دستجرد
- Village
- Location within Iran
- Coordinates: 29°57′03″N 56°14′22″E
- Country: Iran
- Province: Kerman
- County: Bardsir
- Bakhsh: Central
- Rural District: Kuh Panj

Population (2006)
  - Total: 79
- Time zone: UTC+3:30 (IRST)
  - Summer (DST): UTC+4:30 (IRDT)

Dastjerd (Persian: دستجرد; also known as Dastgerd) is a village in Kuh Panj Rural District, in the Central District of Bardsir County, Kerman Province, Iran. At the 2006 census, its population was 79, in 25 families.
