= Dastgerd-e Mar =

Dastgerd-e Mar دستگردمار
- Village
- Location within Iran
- Coordinates: 32°34′12″N 51°56′05″E
- Country: Iran
- Province: Isfahan
- County: Isfahan
- Bakhsh: Central
- Rural District: Baraan-e Shomali

Population (2006)
  - Total: 653
- Time zone: UTC+3:30 (IRST)
  - Summer (DST): UTC+4:30 (IRDT)

Dastgerd-e Mar (Persian: دستگردمار, also Romanized as Dastgerd-e Mār; also known as Dastgerd and Dastjerdbār) is a village in Baraan-e Shomali Rural District, in the Central District of Isfahan County, Isfahan Province, Iran. At the 2006 census, its population was 653, in 153 families.
