= Dastjerd, Kerman =

Dastjerd دستجرد
- Village
- Location within Iran
- Coordinates: 30°45′47″N 56°55′10″E
- Country: Iran
- Province: Kerman
- County: Kerman
- Bakhsh: Central
- Rural District: Sar Asiab-e Farsangi

Population (2006)
  - Total: 15
- Time zone: UTC+3:30 (IRST)
  - Summer (DST): UTC+4:30 (IRDT)

Dastjerd (Persian: دستجرد; also known as Dastgerd) is a village in Sar Asiab-e Farsangi Rural District, in the Central District of Kerman County, Kerman Province, Iran. At the 2006 census, its population was 15, in 5 families.
