= Dastjerd, Roshtkhar =

Dastjerd دستجرد
- Village
- Location within Iran
- Coordinates: 34°57′44″N 59°33′40″E
- Country: Iran
- Province: Razavi Khorasan
- County: Roshtkhar
- Bakhsh: Central
- Rural District: Roshtkhar

Population (2006)
  - Total: 102
- Time zone: UTC+3:30 (IRST)
  - Summer (DST): UTC+4:30 (IRDT)

Dastjerd (Persian: دستجرد, also Romanized as Dastgerd) is a village in Roshtkhar Rural District, in the Central District of Roshtkhar County, Razavi Khorasan Province, Iran. At the 2006 census, its population was 102, in 24 families.
