= Dastgerd-e Nagerd =

Dastgerd-e Nagerd دستگردناگرد
- Village
- Location within Iran
- Coordinates: 26°49′20″N 57°56′33″E
- Country: Iran
- Province: Hormozgan
- County: Bashagard
- Bakhsh: Gowharan
- Rural District: Gowharan

Population (2006)
  - Total: 169
- Time zone: UTC+3:30 (IRST)
  - Summer (DST): UTC+4:30 (IRDT)

Dastgerd-e Nagerd (Persian: دستگردناگرد, also Romanized as Dastgerd-e Nāgerd) is a village in Gowharan Rural District, Gowharan District, Bashagard County, Hormozgan Province, Iran. At the 2006 census, its population was 169, in 44 families.
