= Baghat-e Dastgerdan =

Baghat-e Dastgerdan باغات دستگردان
- Village
- Location within Iran
- Coordinates: 36°09′20″N 58°51′04″E
- Country: Iran
- Province: Razavi Khorasan
- County: Nishapur
- Bakhsh: Central
- Rural District: Rivand

Population (2006)
  - Total: 61
- Time zone: UTC+3:30 (IRST)
  - Summer (DST): UTC+4:30 (IRDT)

Baghat-e Dastgerdan (Persian: باغات دستگردان, also Romanized as Bāghāt-e Dastgerdān; also known as Dastgerdān) is a village in Rivand Rural District, in the Central District of Nishapur County, Razavi Khorasan Province, Iran. At the 2006 census, its population was 61, in 17 families.

== See also ==
- List of cities, towns and villages in Razavi Khorasan Province
