= Rudbar-e Shahrestan Rural District =

Rural district in Qazvin province, Iran

Rudbar-e Shahrestan Rural District Persian: دهستان رودبار شهرستان
- Rural District
- Location within Iran
- Coordinates: 36°33′N 50°12′E
- Country: Iran
- Province: Qazvin
- County: Qazvin
- District: Rudbar-e Alamut-e Gharbi
- Established: 1987
- Capital: Bahramabad

Population (2016)
  - Total: 7,584
- Time zone: UTC+3:30 (IRST)

Rudbar-e Shahrestan Rural District (Persian: دهستان رودبار شهرستان) is in Rudbar-e Alamut-e Gharbi District (Note: Formerly Rudbar-e Shahrestan District) of Qazvin County, Qazvin province, Iran. Its capital is the village of Bahramabad.

== Demographics ==
=== Population ===
At the time of the 2006 National Census, the rural district's population was 6,057 in 1,676 households. There were 5,301 inhabitants in 1,795 households at the following census of 2011. The 2016 census measured the population of the rural district as 7,584 in 2,634 households. The most populous of its 53 villages was Hir, with 726 people.

=== Other villages in the rural district ===
- Aku Jan-e Qadim
- Fashaak
- Parchkuh
- Por Rud
- Rashkin
- Shahrestan-e Sofla
- Talater
- Vartavan
