= Dastgerd, Zaz and Mahru =

Dastgerd دستگرد
- Village
- Location within Iran
- Coordinates: 33°09′42″N 49°19′35″E
- Country: Iran
- Province: Lorestan
- County: Aligudarz
- Bakhsh: Zaz and Mahru
- Rural District: Zaz-e Sharqi

Population (2006)
  - Total: 254
- Time zone: UTC+3:30 (IRST)
  - Summer (DST): UTC+4:30 (IRDT)

Dastgerd (Persian: دستگرد) is a village in Zaz-e Sharqi Rural District, Zaz and Mahru District, Aligudarz County, Lorestan Province, Iran. At the 2006 census, its population was 254, in 35 families.
