= Rudbar-e Mohammad-e Zamani Rural District =

Rural district in Qazvin province, Iran

Rudbar-e Mohammad-e Zamani Rural District Persian: دهستان رودبار محمد زمانی
- Rural District
- Location within Iran
- Coordinates: 36°30′N 50°18′E
- Country: Iran
- Province: Qazvin
- County: Qazvin
- District: Rudbar-e Alamut-e Gharbi
- Established: 1987
- Capital: Rajai Dasht

Population (2016)
  - Total: 9,355
- Time zone: UTC+3:30 (IRST)

Rudbar-e Mohammad-e Zamani Rural District (Persian: دهستان رودبار محمد زمانی) is in Rudbar-e Alamut-e Gharbi District (Note: Formerly Rudbar-e Shahrestan District) of Qazvin County, Qazvin province, Iran. Its capital is the village of Rajai Dasht.

== Demographics ==
=== Population ===
At the time of the 2006 National Census, the rural district's population was 7,622 in 2,273 households. There were 6,710 inhabitants in 2,254 households at the following census of 2011. The 2016 census measured the population of the rural district as 9,355 in 3,268 households. The most populous of its 50 villages was Ya Rud, with 790 people.

=== Other villages in the rural district ===
- Durchak
- Hasanabad
- Juyank
- Katekan
- Mohammadabad
- Safarin
- Simiyar
- Tanureh
