= Dastjerdeh-ye Sofla =

Dastjerdeh-ye Sofla دستجرده سفلي
- Village
- Location within Iran
- Coordinates: 34°34′45″N 47°33′10″E
- Country: Iran
- Province: Kermanshah
- County: Sahneh
- Bakhsh: Dinavar
- Rural District: Dinavar

Population (2006)
  - Total: 371
- Time zone: UTC+3:30 (IRST)
  - Summer (DST): UTC+4:30 (IRDT)

Dastjerdeh-ye Sofla (Persian: دستجرده سفلي, Southern Kurdish: دەسەگردەێ خوار also Romanized as Dastjerdeh-ye Soflá; also known as Dastjerd-e Soflá) is a village in Dinavar Rural District, Dinavar District, Sahneh County, Kermanshah Province, Iran. At the 2006 census, its population was 371, in 84 families.
