= Dastjerdeh-ye Olya =

Dastjerdeh-ye Olya دستجرده عليا
- Village
- Location within Iran
- Coordinates: 34°34′20″N 47°33′51″E
- Country: Iran
- Province: Kermanshah
- County: Sahneh
- Bakhsh: Dinavar
- Rural District: Dinavar

Population (2006)
  - Total: 94
- Time zone: UTC+3:30 (IRST)
  - Summer (DST): UTC+4:30 (IRDT)

Dastjerdeh-ye Olya (Persian: دستجرده عليا, Southern Kurdish: دەسەگردەێ بان, also Romanized as Dastjerdeh-ye ‘Olyā; also known as Dastjerdeh, Dastjerdeh-ye Bālā, and Dastjerd-e ‘Olyā) is a village in Dinavar Rural District, Dinavar District, Sahneh County, Kermanshah Province, Iran. At the 2006 census, its population was 94, in 25 families.
