= Qazvin County =

County in Qazvin province, Iran

Qazvin County Persian: شهرستان قزوین
- County
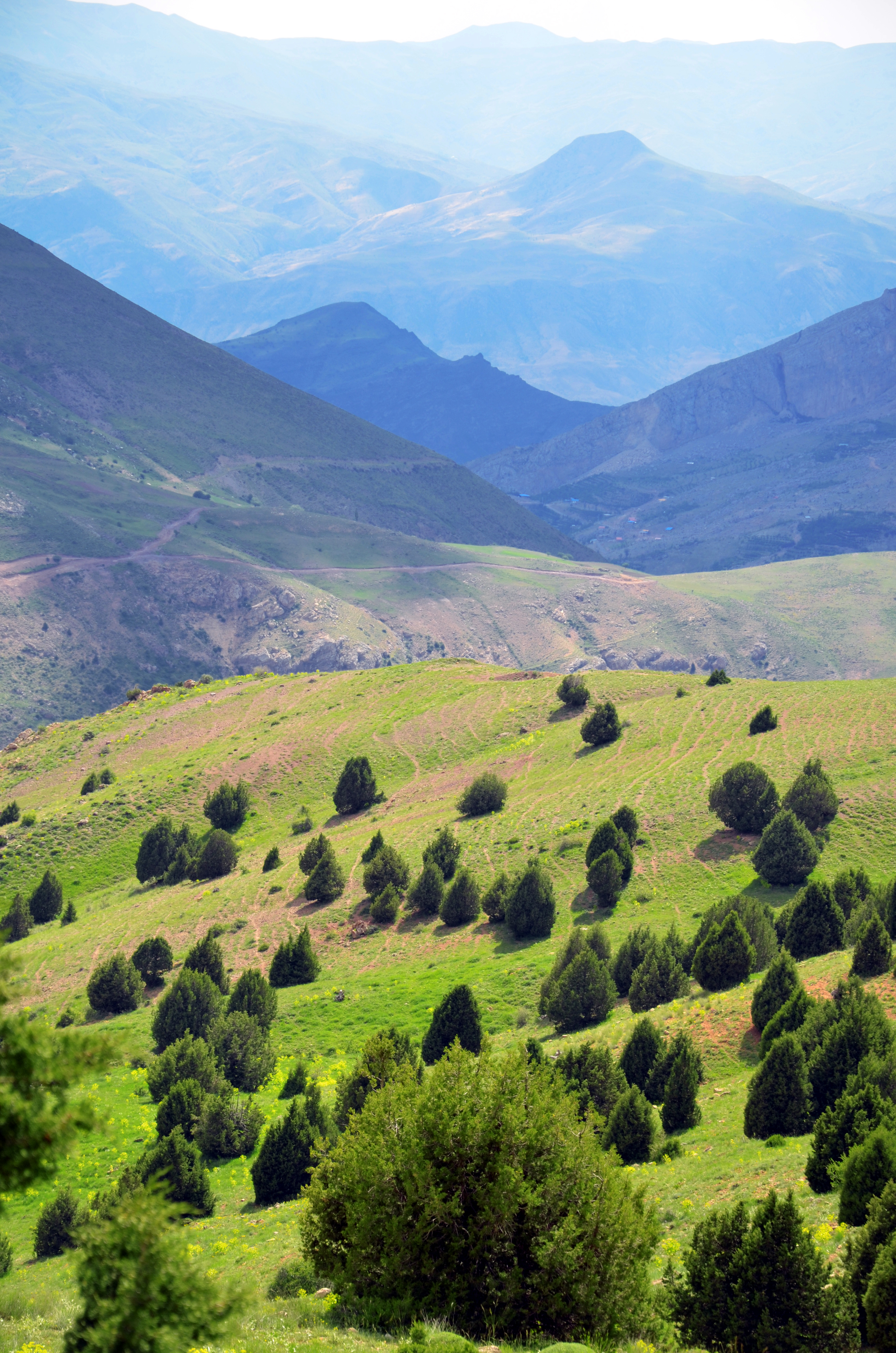
- Landscape in the Alamut region of Qazvin County

- Location of Qazvin County in Qazvin province (yellow)

- Location of Qazvin province in Iran
- Coordinates: 36°28′N 49°55′E
- Country: Iran
- Province: Qazvin
- Capital: Qazvin
- Districts: Central, Alamut-e Gharbi, Alamut-e Sharqi, Kuhin, Tarom-e Sofla

Population (2016)
  - Total: 596,932
- Time zone: UTC+3:30 (IRST)

Qazvin County (Persian: شهرستان قزوین) is in Qazvin province, Iran. Its capital is the city of Qazvin.

== Demographics ==
=== Languages and ethnic groups ===
Persians, Azeris and Tats are the largest ethnic groups in Qazvin County. According to some sources, the majority of people in northern Qazvin (Alamut) are Tats who speak a dialect of the Tati language. However, other sources claim that the majority of people in Alamut are Mazandarani or Gilaks who speak a dialect of the Mazandarani language or Gilaki language.

According to some linguists, the term "Tati" was used by Turkic speakers to refer to non-Turkic speakers. This could explain why some sources claim the people of Alamut are Tats, while others claim they are Mazanderani or Gilaks. Likely, the "Tats" of Alamut are Mazandarani or Gilak speakers who have been labeled as Tats, as historically they were considered Mazandarani or Gilaks.

=== Population ===
At the time of the 2006 National Census, the county's population was 530,961 in 142,781 households. The following census in 2011 counted 566,773 people in 169,078 households. The 2016 census measured the population of the county as 596,932 in 188,460 households.

=== Administrative divisions ===
Qazvin County's population history and administrative structure over three consecutive censuses are shown in the following table.

Qazvin County Population
Administrative Divisions	2006	2011	2016
Central District	469,367	509,953	517,952
Eqbal-e Gharbi RD	37,488	36,404	27,796
Eqbal-e Sharqi RD	13,159	14,657	10,360
Eqbaliyeh (city)	49,230	55,498	55,066
Mahmudabad-e Nemuneh (city)	19,669	21,796	21,982
Qazvin (city)	349,821	381,598	402,748
Kuhin District	17,411	15,587	19,222
Ilat-e Qaqazan-e Gharbi RD	6,133	4,422	7,161
Ilat-e Qaqazan-e Sharqi RD	9,880	9,543	10,650
Kuhin (city)	1,398	1,622	1,411
Rudbar-e Alamut-e Gharbi District (Note: Formerly Rudbar-e Shahrestan District)	16,255	15,056	20,896
Dastjerd RD	1,611	1,881	2,704
Rudbar-e Mohammad-e Zamani RD	7,622	6,710	9,355
Rudbar-e Shahrestan RD	6,057	5,301	7,584
Razmian (city)	965	1,164	1,253
Rudbar-e Alamut-e Sharqi District (Note: Formerly Rudbar-e Alamut District)	12,519	9,801	13,701
Alamut-e Bala RD	4,398	3,622	5,067
Alamut-e Pain RD	3,596	2,999	3,241
Moallem Kalayeh RD	2,329	1,573	3,170
Moallem Kalayeh (city)	2,196	1,607	2,223
Tarom-e Sofla District	15,409	15,839	25,160
Chuqur RD	2,308	2,161	3,547
Khandan RD	7,892	7,856	12,013
Kuhgir RD	2,873	1,861	4,547
Niyarak RD	1,874	2,923	4,248
Sirdan (city)	462	1,038	805
Total	530,961	566,773	596,932
RD = Rural District

== See also ==
Media related to Qazvin County at Wikimedia Commons
