= Rudbar-e Alamut-e Gharbi District =

District in Qazvin province, Iran

Rudbar-e Alamut-e Gharbi District Persian: بخش رودبار الموت غربی
- District
- Location within Iran
- Coordinates: 36°31′N 50°09′E
- Country: Iran
- Province: Qazvin
- County: Qazvin
- Established: 1989
- Capital: Razmian

Population (2016)
  - Total: 20,896
- Time zone: UTC+3:30 (IRST)

Rudbar-e Alamut-e Gharbi District (Persian: بخش رودبار الموت غربی) (Note: Formerly Rudbar-e Shahrestan District (بخش رودبار شهرستان)) is located in Qazvin County, Qazvin province, Iran. Its capital is the city of Razmian.

== Demographics ==
=== Language and ethnicity ===
According to some sources, the majority of people in northern Qazvin (Alamut) are Tats who speak a dialect of the Tati language. However, other sources claim that the majority of people in Alamut are Mazanderani or Gilaks who speak a dialect of the Mazanderani language or Gilaki language.

According to some linguists, the term 'Tati' was used by Turkic speakers to refer to non-turkic speakers. This could explain why some sources claim the people of Alamut are Tats, while others claim they are Mazanderanies or Gilaks. Likely, the 'Tats' of Alamut are Mazanderani or Gilak speakers who have been labeled as Tats as historically they were considered Mazanderani or Gilaks.

=== Population ===
At the time of the 2006 National Census, the district's population was 16,255 in 4,667 households. The following census in 2011 counted 15,056 people in 4,953 households. The 2016 census measured the population of the district as 20,896 inhabitants in 7,272 households.

=== Administrative divisions ===
Rudbar-e Alamut-e Gharbi District Population
Administrative Divisions	2006	2011	2016
Dastjerd RD	1,611	1,881	2,704
Rudbar-e Mohammad-e Zamani RD	7,622	6,710	9,355
Rudbar-e Shahrestan RD	6,057	5,301	7,584
Razmian (city)	965	1,164	1,253
Total	16,255	15,056	20,896
RD = Rural District
