= List of DGPs of Uttar Pradesh =

Director General of Police of Uttar Pradesh Police
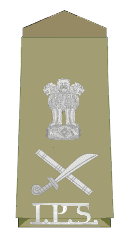
- Shoulder rank of DGP
- Incumbent; Rajeev Krishna since 31 May 2025
- Department of Home and Confidential
- Reports to: Chief Minister of Uttar Pradesh
- Residence: Lucknow, Uttar Pradesh
- Nominator: Union Public Service Commission
- Appointer: Government of Uttar Pradesh
- Formation: 5 March 1982
- First holder: Naresh Kumar
- Deputy: Additional Director General of Police
- Salary: • ₹225,000 (US$2,300) (monthly)

This article contains the list of the directors general of police (DGP) of Uttar Pradesh Police, which is the highest-ranking police officer in India. The DGP of the state is appointed by the state government and reports to the Ministry of Home Affairs. The position is typically headed by an Indian Police Service (IPS) officer and the process is done through by consultation of Union Public Service Commission, which prepares the list of the eligiable officers and final appointment is made by the state government.

Naresh Kumar was the first DGP of the Uttar Pradesh Police and the position is currently headed by Rajeev Krishna, who is incumbent from 31 May 2025.

== List ==
Name	Term start	Term end	Ref.
Naresh Kumar	5 March 1982	24 July 1982	
R M Shukla	20 July 2002	20 March 2003	
Hakam Singh	20 March 2003	28 June 2004	
V K B Nair	28 June 2004	10 January 2005	
Yashpal Singh	11 January 2005	3 April 2006	
Bua Singh	3 April 2006	14 March 2007	
G L Sharma	15 March 2007	23 June 2007	
Vikram Singh	23 June 2007	23 September 2009	
Karamvir Singh	23 September 2009	31 August 2011	
R K Tiwari	31 August 2011	30 September 2011	
Brij Lal	30 September 2011	8 January 2012	
Atul	8 January 2012	19 March 2012	
A C Sharma	19 March 2012	11 March 2013	
Deo Raj Nagar	12 March 2013	31 December 2013	
Rizwan Ahmad	1 January 2014	28 February 2014	
Anand Lal Banerjee	28 February 2014	31 December 2014	
Arun Kumar Gupta (acting)	1 January 2015	31 January 2015	
Arvind Kumar Jain	31 January 2015	30 June 2015	
Jagmohan Yadav	30 June 2015	21 January 2015	
S Javeed Ahmad	1 January 2016	21 April 2017	
Sulkhan Singh	21 April 2017	31 December 2017	
Om Prakash Singh	23 January 2018	31 January 2020	
Hitesh Awasthy	4 March 2020	30 June 2021	
Mukul Goel	2 July 2021	11 May 2022	
Dr. Devendra Singh Chauhan (acting)	13 May 2022	30 May 2023	
Dr. R K Vishwakarma (acting)	31 March 2023	30 May 2023	
Vijay Kumar (acting)	31 May 2023	30 January 2024	
Prashant Kumar (acting)	31 January 2024	30 May 2025	
Rajeev Krishna	31 May 2025	Incumbent	
