= Chavviram Singh Yadav =

Indian bandit (1940–1982)

Chhavviram Singh Yadav
- Born: 1940; Harnagarpur Mainpuri district, United Province, India
- Died: 3 March 1982; Aliganj Etah, Uttar Pradesh
- Occupation: Dacoit

CH.Chhavviram Singh Yadav was a dacoit (member of an Indian armed robbery gang) from Uttar Pradesh. One of his most trusted fellows was CH. Udaiveer Singh from the village Harnagarpur, Ghiror, UP.

== Early life ==
Neta ji Chaudhary Chhavviram Singh was a resident of Harnagarpur village in the Mainpuri district of Uttar Pradesh. At the age of twenty, he became a dacoit. He spread panic in Uttar Pradesh, Madhya Pradesh and Rajasthan by dacoity and murder. Even the police did not dare to confront him. He led a gang that was accused of killing a Member of the Legislative Assembly and burying the dead body. He projected himself as the messiah of the people. VP Singh became the Chief Minister of Uttar Pradesh in June 1980. At that time, dacoits were dominant in Uttar Pradesh. Chhaviram's terror was also at its peak. VP Singh along with the government of MP launched a major campaign to eradicate bandits in Uttar Pradesh. The government announced a reward of five lakh rupees for the capture of Chhaviram. But the police could not catch him. District Etah was considered the place of refuge of Dasyu Chhaviram Singh. Police forces set up camps in Aliganj area. 7 August 1981 became the day of call for Uttar Pradesh Police. The Police Station inspector of Aliganj, Rajpal Singh, was eagerly waiting for this day. On the information of an informer, Inspector Rajpal Singh reached Nathuapur village, along with his companions. Some 60-70 outlaws were gathered in the village. In this encounter that lasted for hours, Chhaviram brutally killed fifteen policemen including Inspector Rajpal Singh, by laying siege from all sides. Three villagers also died. In early 1982, Chhaviram kidnapped the circle officer of Aliganj tehsil of Etah district. He suspected that the administration was torturing his supporters to learn about his operations. Chhaviram had challenged the government by kidnapping the Circle Officer of Police. Indira Gandhi was the Prime Minister at that time. The incident was a blow to the image of the government. Indira Gandhi is said to have given tacit consent to VP Singh to kill Chhaviram. At the behest of Indira Gandhi, the governments of Uttar Pradesh, Madhya Pradesh and Rajasthan issued warrants. Considering this incident of 1981 as a challenge, the then Chief Minister VP Singh made a plan to eliminate the dacoit Chhaviram, and after two years, the Uttar Pradesh Police found and, after an encounter that lasted more than seven hours, killed the dacoit Chhaviram. During this, SSP Vikram Singh took over in Etah, Uttar Pradesh and later became the Director General of Police of Uttar Pradesh Police in 2007.

== Family after encounter ==
After the elimination of dacoit Chavviram in 1982, his wife Dhan Devi took her children to be educated in her maternal home village, Nagla District Kannauj. They had three sons – Shyam Singh Yadav, Sarvesh Kumar Yadav and Ajay Pal Singh Yadav. The two elder sons became farmers, and ironically, the youngest son Ajay Pal Singh Yadav became Sub-Inspector in Uttar Pradesh Police.
