= Kanpur Nagar Police Commissionerate =

Police unit in Kanpur Nagar, India

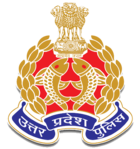

- Flag
- Motto: सुरक्षा आपकी, संकल्प हमारा (Hindi); Your protection, our pledge

Agency overview
- Formed: 25 March 2021

Jurisdictional structure
- Operations jurisdiction: Municipal limits of Kanpur Nagar district, India
- Area: 403 km^{2} (156 sq mi)
- Population: 27,65,348
- Governing body: Department of Home, Government of Uttar Pradesh
- General nature: Local civilian police

Operational structure
- Headquarters: Police Commissioner Kanpur Nagar Office
- Elected officer responsible: Yogi Adityanath, Chief Minister
- Agency executive: B. P. Jogdand, IPS, Commissioner of Police
- Parent agency: Uttar Pradesh Police

Facilities
- Stations: 49 Police Stations
- SUV, Motorcycles: 326

The Kanpur Nagar Police Commissionerate is the police department within the municipal limits of Kanpur. It is a part of Uttar Pradesh Police and has the primary responsibilities of law enforcement and investigation in Kanpur city.

It is headed by an IPS officer in the rank of ADG as its Commissioner of Police.

On 3 November 2022, it was decided to include all 11 Police station of Kanpur outer police in Kanpur Nagar Police Commissionerate leading to 49 police stations.

== History ==
Before 2020, Kanpur Nagar district police came under Kanpur police zone and Kanpur police range of Uttar Pradesh Police. Kanpur zone is headed by an IPS officer in the rank of Additional director general of police (ADG), whereas Kanpur range is headed by an IPS officer in the rank of Inspector General of Police (IG).

Police Administration of Kanpur was headed by the Senior Superintendent of Police (SSP) who was an IPS officer. He was assisted by six Superintendents of Police (SP)/Additional Superintendents of Police (Addl. SP) (East, North, West, South, Traffic and Crime). The district was divided into twelve police circles, each responsibility of a Circle Officer (CO) in the rank of Deputy Superintendent of Police.

== List of Head of Organization of Kanpur Nagar Police ==
=== Senior Superintendent of Police of Kanpur Nagar ===
Since Independence of the nation till 26 March 2021, 75 Indian Police Service officers have served as the head of organization of kanpur police as Senior Superintendent of Police (SSP).

Sr. No.	Name	From	To
01	K.P. Singh	19.07.1947	07.11.1947
02	Onkar Singh	07.11.1947	04.06.1952
03	A.K Das	04.06.1952	02.09.1957
04	G. Chandra	02.09.1957	26.07.1960
05	S. Tondon	26.07.1960	26.03.1962
06	J.M. Jain	26.03.1962	24.07.1962
07	S. Tondon	24.07.1962	20.07.1964
08	K.P. Singh	20.07.1964	02.09.1966
09	G.S. Arya	02.09.1966	18.05.1969
10	J.N. Chaturvedi	18.05.1969	27.03.1970
11	R.S. Sharma	27.03.1970	05.09.1970
12	R.D. Pandey	05.09.1970	30.01.1972
13	K.P. Srivastava	30.01.1972	08.03.1973
14	J.N. Awasthy	08.03.1973	12.12.1973
15	S.C. Mukherjee	12.12.1973	16.01.1976
16	Y.N. Saxena	16.01.1976	13.07.1977
17	V.S. Mathur	13.07.1977	02.03.1978
18	S.V.M. Tripathi	02.03.1978	16.06.1979
19	V.S. Bedi	16.06.1979	02.12.1980
20	V.N. Singh	02.12.1980	11.06.1983
21	M.C. Rawat	11.06.1983	22.06.1984
22	A.K. Mitra	22.06.1984	17.05.1986
23	Y.P.Singh	17.05.1986	15.08.1988
24	Vikram Singh	15.08.1988	14.02.1991
25	Subhash Joshi	14.02.1991	04.07.1991
26	D.N. Samal	04.07.1991	01.10.1992
27	A.C. Sharma	01.10.1992	11.12.1992
28	Subhash Joshi	11.12.1992	04.02.1993
29	V.K.Singh	04.02.1993	20.06.1993
30	K.N. Rai	20.06.1993	31.12.1993
31	Rameshwar Dayal	31.12.1993	19.05.1994
32	J. M. Yadav	19.05.1994	08.06.1995
33	S.N.Singh	08.06.1995	29.12.1995
34	Praveen Singh	29.12.1995	06.08.1996
35	Arun Kumar	06.08.1996	20.02.1997
36	B.P. Singh	20.02.1997	06.04.1997
37	V.K. Sharma	06.04.1997	08.05.1997
38	A.P. Maheshwari	08.05.1997	05.10.1997
39	A.K.D. Divwedi	05.10.1997	18.04.1998
40	R.K. Mishra	18.04.1998	11.07.1998
41	R.N. Srivastava	11.07.1998	02.10.1998
42	M. A. Ganpati	02.10.1998	04.05.1999
43	Sutapa Saniyal	04.05.1999	02.11.1999
44	P.K. Joshi	02.11.1999	28.02.2000
45	G.P. Sharma	20.02.2000	27.03.2001
46	Arun Kumar	27.03.2001	16.08.2001
47	V.K. Singh	16.08.2001	10.05.2002
48	R.P. Singh	10.05.2002	30.11.2002
49	M.K. Bashal	30.11.2002	09.09.2003
50	R.V. Singh	09.09.2003	14.03.2005
51	P.C. Meena	14.03.2005	04.12.2006
52	Alok Singh	04.12.2006	14.05.2007
53	A.K. Prasad	14.05.2007	30.08.2007
54	Rajeev Sabbarwal	30.08.2007	02.12.2007
55	Anand Swaroop	02.12.2007	27.03.2008
56	A.K Singh	27.03.2008	04.10.2008
57	H.R. Sharma	06.10.2008	05.02.2009
58	H.R. Sharma	05.02.2009	19.06.2009
59	Neera Rawat	16.06.2009	23.10.2009
60	B.P. Jogdand	23.10.2009	14.02.2010
61	Prem Prakash	14.02.2010	10.11.2010
62	Mutha Ashok Jain	10.11.2010	11.02.2011
63	Rajesh Kumar Rai	11.02.2011	21.03.2012
64	Amitabh Yash	21.03.2012	12.12.2012
65	Yashasvi Yadav	14.12.2012	06.03.2014
66	Ajay Kumar	10.03.2014	09.06.2014
67	K.S. Emmanuel	09.06.2014	20.12.2014
68	Shalabh Mathur	22.12.2014	15.10.2016
69	H.N. Singh	15.10.2016	20.10.2016
70	Akash Kulhari	20.10.2016	16.05.2017
71	Sonia Singh	16.05.2017	26.10.2017
72	Akhilesh Kumar	26.10.2017	30.08.2018
73	Anant Dev Tiwari	30.08.2018	18.06.2020
74	Dinesh Kumar P.	18.06.2020	26.07.2020
75	Preetinder Singh	26.07.2020	26.03.2021

=== Police Commissioner of Kanpur Nagar ===
On 26 March 2021, Government of Uttar Pradesh decided to make commissionerate in Kanpur Nagar city headed by rank of Additional Director of Police (ADG). Asim Arun was first Police Commissioner of Kanpur Nagar.

Sr. No.	Name	From	To
01	Asim Arun	26.03.2021	14.01.2022
02	Vijay Singh Meena	14.01.2022	01.08.2022
03	B.P. Jogdand	01.08.2022	19.08.2023
04	Dr. RK Swarnkar	20.08.2023	31.12.2023
05	Akhil Kumar	01.01.2024	Incumbent

== Organisation ==
The Kanpur Commissionerate Police is headed by Commissioner of Police who is assisted by two Additional Commissioner of Police of i.e. Addl. CP Law & Order and Addl. CP Crime (IG). Police Commissionerate is divided into four police zones (East, West, Central and South), each headed by a Deputy Commissioner of Police which consists of 12 circles headed by Assistant Commissioner of Police and 49 police stations.

Hierarchy structure of the Kanpur Nagar Police
Rank	Abbreviation	Strength
Commissioner of Police (ADGP)	CP	1
Additional Commissioner of Police (IG)	Addl. CP	2
Deputy Commissioner of Police (SP)	DCP	8
Additional Deputy Commissioner of Police (Additional SP)	ADCP	10
Assistant Commissioner of Police (Deputy SP/Assistant SP/Assistant Radio Officer)	ACP	20
Police Inspector	Inspector	47
Police Sub Inspector	SI	95
Head Constable	HC	1824
Police Constable	Constable	5254

=== Police stations ===
Police stations under the jurisdiction of Kanpur Nagar Police Commissionerate are as follows:

1. Anwar Ganj Police Station
2. Armapur Police Station
3. Babupurwa Police Station
4. Badshahinaka Police Station
5. Bajaria Police Station
6. Barra Police Station
7. Beconganj Police Station
8. Bidhnu Police Station
9. Bilhaur Police Station
10. Bithoor Police Station
11. Cantt. Police Station
12. Chakeri Police Station
13. Chaman Ganj Police Station
14. Chaubepur Police Station
15. Collector Ganj Police Station
16. Colonelganj Police Station
17. Fazalganj Police Station
18. Govind Nagar Police Station
19. Ghatampur Police Station
20. Gwaltoli Police Station
21. Harbans Mohal Police Station
22. Juhi Police Station
23. Kakadeo Police Station
24. Kakwan Police Station
25. Kalyanpur Police Station
26. Kidwai Nagar Police Station
27. Kohna Police Station
28. Kotwali Police Station
29. Maharajpur Police Station
30. Mahila Thana Police Station
31. Moolganj Police Station
32. Narwal Police Station
33. Naubasta Police Station
34. Nawabganj Police Station
35. Nazirabad Police Station
36. Panki Police Station
37. Philkhana Police Station
38. Railbazar Police Station
39. Raipurwa Police Station
40. Saandh Police Station
41. Sachendi Police Station
42. Sajeti Police Station
43. Shivrajpur Police Station
44. Sisamau Police Station
45. Swaroop Nagar Police Station

== See also ==
- Uttar Pradesh Police
- Lucknow City Police
