= Gautam Buddh Nagar Police Commissionerate =

Unit of Uttar Pradesh Police in Gautam Buddha Nagar Police

Gautam Buddha Nagar Police Commissionerate
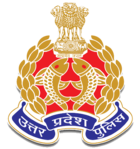
- Gautam Buddha Nagar Police Commissionerate
- Common name: Noida Police Commissionerate or Noida Police
- Abbreviation: GBNPC
- Motto: सुरक्षा आपकी, संकल्प हमारा (Hindi); Your Safety, Our Pledge

Agency overview
- Formed: 15 January 2020; 6 years ago

Jurisdictional structure
- Operations jurisdiction: Gautam Buddha Nagar, India
- Gautam Buddha Nagar Police Commissionerate Jurisdictional Area
- Legal jurisdiction: Gautam Buddha Nagar
- Governing body: Department of Home; Uttar Pradesh Government
- General nature: Local civilian police

Operational structure
- Headquarters: Office of Commissioner of Police, Sector-108, Noida, Gautam Buddha Nagar
- Minister responsible: Yogi Adityanath (Chief Minister), Minister of Home
- Agency executive: Laxmi Singh (IPS), Commissioner of Police
- Parent agency: Uttar Pradesh Police

Website
- noidapolice.com/web/

The Gautam Buddha Nagar Police Commissionerate (GBNPC) is the police department of the Gautam Buddha Nagar District, Uttar Pradesh. It is a part of Uttar Pradesh Police and has the primary responsibilities of law enforcement and investigation in Gautam Buddha Nagar.

Gautam Buddha Nagar Police Commissionerate is also known as Noida Police Commissionerate or (Noida Police).

It is headed by an IPS officer of the rank of Additional Director General of Police (ADGP) as its Commissioner of Police, who is appointed by the Home Minister of Uttar Pradesh.

The current police commissioner of Noida is 2000 batch IPS officer Laxmi Singh who is of IG rank and serving since 29 November 2022. She is the first female police commissioner in the state since the start of Commissionerate system.

== History ==
On 13 January 2020, Chief Minister Yogi Adityanath's Cabinet passed the decision of making 2 police Commissionerate in the state.

- First being in the Lucknow, the capital and the largest city of Uttar Pradesh
- Second one in Gautam Buddha Nagar District or Noida.

IPS Alok Singh was appointed as the first police commissioner of Gautam Buddha Nagar by the Home Department of Uttar Pradesh.

Before 2020, the police department in the district was headed by the Senior Superintendent of Police (SSP).

== Headquarters ==
Office of CP at Traffic Police Park in Noida serves as the headquarters of Noida Police.

On 19 January 2020, Chief Minister Yogi Adityanath inaugurated the new Commissionerate office at City's Traffic Park, Sector-108, Noida.

== See also ==
- Noida
- Gautam Buddha Nagar District
- Uttar Pradesh Police
- Lucknow City Police
