= Agra Police Commissionerate =

Police Department of Agra, India

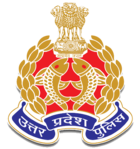
- Agra Police Commissionerate
- Motto: सुरक्षा आपकी, संकल्प हमारा (Hindi); Your Safety, Our Pledge

Agency overview
- Formed: 26 November 2022; 3 years ago

Jurisdictional structure
- Operations jurisdiction: Agra, India
- Agra Police Commissionerate jurisdictional area.
- Legal jurisdiction: Agra
- Governing body: Department of Home; Uttar Pradesh Government
- General nature: Local civilian police

Operational structure
- Headquarters: Office of Commissioner of Police, Agra
- Minister responsible: Yogi Adityanath (Chief Minister), Minister of Home
- Agency executive: J. RAVINDER GOUD (IPS), Commissioner of Police
- Parent agency: Uttar Pradesh Police

The Agra Police Commissionerate is the primary law enforcement agency for the city of Agra in the Indian state of Uttar Pradesh. It is a unit of the Uttar Pradesh Police and has the primary responsibilities of law enforcement and investigation within the limits of Agra. It is headed by the Commissioner of Police (CP), who is an IPS officer of IGP rank.

J. RAVINDER GOUD the current police commissioner of Agra.[1]

== History ==
Before November 2022, Agra District Police came under Agra Police Zone and Agra Police Range of Uttar Pradesh Police. Agra zone is headed by an IPS officer in the rank of Additional Director General of Police (ADG), whereas the Agra range is headed by an IPS officer in the rank of Inspector General of Police (IG).

On 26 November 2022, state's cabinet passed the order of making 3 more police commissionerates in the state after the success of previous 4 police commissionerates in other cities of the state.

1. In Agra,
2. Ghaziabad and
3. Prayagraj

== See also ==
- Agra
- Uttar Pradesh Police
- Lucknow Police
