= Varanasi Police Commissionerate =

Police department of Varanasi, Uttar Pradesh

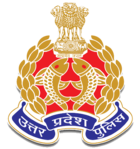
- Varanasi Police Commissionerate

- Flag of Varanasi Police
- Common name: Varanasi Police
- Motto: Surakṣā āpakī, saṃkalpa hamārā (Hindi) "Your Safety, Our Pledge"

Agency overview
- Formed: 25 March 2021; 5 years ago
- Preceding agency: Varanasi Police

Jurisdictional structure
- Operations jurisdiction: Uttar Pradesh, India
- Map of Varanasi Police Commissionerate's jurisdiction
- Legal jurisdiction: Varanasi and Ramnagar town
- General nature: Local civilian police

Operational structure
- Overseen by: Department of Home & Confidential, Government of Uttar Pradesh
- Headquarters: Kacheri Parisar, Opposite Circuit House Gate, Varanasi
- Minister responsible: Yogi Adityanath (Chief Minister), Minister of Home Affairs
- Agency executive: Mohit Agarwal IPS, Commissioner of Police
- Parent agency: Uttar Pradesh Police
- Child agencies: Cyber Crime; Crime Against Women; Traffic Police; River Police; Anti-Human Trafficking; Dial 112; Crime Branch

Facilities
- Thanas: 30 (including Mahila Thana & Paryatak Thana)
- Patrol cars: Dial 112, PRV, Bikes, Boats

The Varanasi Police Commissionerate is the primary law enforcement agency for the city of Varanasi in the Indian state of Uttar Pradesh. It is a unit of the Uttar Pradesh Police and has the primary responsibilities of law enforcement and investigation within the limits of Varanasi. It is headed by the Commissioner of Police (CP), who is an IPS officer of ADGP rank, and is assisted by two Additional Commissioners of Police (Addl. CP) who are of DIG rank, and two Deputy Commissioners of Police (DCP), who are of SP rank.

== History ==
Before March 2021, Varanasi District Police came under the Varanasi Police Zone and Varanasi Police Range of Uttar Pradesh Police. Varanasi zone is headed by an IPS officer in the rank of Additional Director General of Police (ADG), whereas the Varanasi range is headed by an IPS officer in the rank of Inspector General of Police (IG).

The police administration of Varanasi district was headed by the Senior Superintendent of Police (SSP), who was an IPS officer. He was assisted by four Superintendents of Police (SP)/Additional Superintendents of Police (Addl. SP) (City, Rural, Protocol, Traffic). The district was divided into eight police circles, each with a Circle Officer (CO) in the rank of Deputy Superintendent of Police. This administration of the police now falls under the Varanasi Police Commissionerate.

== Structure ==
The Varanasi Police Commissionerate is headed by a Police Commissioner who is of ADG rank and is assisted by two Additional Commissioner of Police (Addl. CP) of DIG rank.

There are a total of 30 stations that come under the Varanasi Police Commissionerate. Earlier, it had two zones with 18 police stations; on 15 November 2022, it was reorganised with Gomti as the new zone. With the new zone Varanasi Rural Police was merged into the Commissionerate.

=== Zones ===
- Varuna Zone
  1. Cantt. Circle
  2. Sarnath Circle
  3. Rohaniya Circle
- Kashi Zone
  1. Bhelupur Circle
  2. Kotwali Circle
  3. Dashaswamedh Circle
  4. Chetganj Circle
- Gomti Zone
  1. Pindra Circle
  2. Rajatalab Circle

== Police Stations ==
Under the police commissionerate system in Varanasi, the city's 30 police stations are divided into three zones: Kashi, Varuna and Gomti. 9 circles have been earmarked in three zones. 30 police stations come under the purview of these 9 circles.

=== Varuna Zone ===
- Cantt. Circle
1. Cantt.
2. Shivpur
3. Lalpur-Pandeypur
- Sarnath Circle
1. Sarnath
2. Chaubeypur
3. Cholapur
4. Paryatak Thana
- Rohaniya Circle
1. Rohaniya
2. Manduadih
3. Lohta

=== Kashi Zone ===
- Bhelupur Circle
1. Bhelupur
2. Lanka
3. Chitaipur
- Kotwali Circle
1. Kotwali
2. Ramnagar
3. Adampur
4. Mahila Thana
- Dashaswamedh Circle
1. Dashaswamedh
2. Chowk
3. Luxa
- Chetganj Circle
1. Chetganj
2. Jaitpura
3. Sigra

=== Gomti Zone ===
- Rajatalab Circle
1. Rajatalab
2. Mirzamurad
3. Kapsethi
4. Jansa
- Pindra Circle
1. Sindhaura
2. Badagaon
3. Phoolpur
4. Mahila Thana

== Officers & Appointments ==
IPS Officers
S.No	Name of IPS Officer	Rank	Posted as
1	MOHIT AGARWAL	ADG	COMMISSIONER OF POLICE
2	DR. K. EJILEARASSANE	IG	JOINT COMMISSIONER OF POLICE HQ/CRIME
3	SHIVASIMPI CHANNAPPA	DIG	ADDL. COMM. OF POLICE LAW & ORDER, COMMISIONARATE
4	SURYA KANT TRIPATHI	SP	DCP SECURITY & INTELIJENCE
5	PRAMOD KUMAR	SP	DCP KASHI zone
6	HIRDESH KUMAR	SP	DCP TRAFFIC & PROTOCOL
7	SHYAM NARAYAN SINGH	SP	DCP VARUNA ZONE, HQ & ACC
8	MANISH KUMAR SHANDILYA	ADDL. SP	DCP GOMATI ZONE & LINE
9	CHANDRA KANT MEENA	ADDL. SP	ADCP KASHI ZONE
10	AKASH PATEL	ADDL. SP	ADCP GOMATI ZONE & LINE
11	SARAVANAN. T	ADDL. SP	ADCP VARUNA ZONE AND CRIME
12	SHRUTI SRIVASTAVA	ADDL. SP	ACP LINE
13	NEETU	ADDL. SP	ACP CHETGANJ & LINE
14	DEVENDRA KUMAR	ASP	SHO Chaubepur

PPS Officers
S.No	Name of PPS Officer	Rank	Posted as
1	MAMTA RANI CHAUDHARY	ADDL. SP	ADCP WOMEN CRIME
2	RAJESH KUMAR PANDEY	ADDL. SP	ADCP TRAFFIC & PROTOCOL
3	KRISHNA KANT SAROJ	ADDL. SP	ADCP PROTOCOL & HQ
4	VIRENDRA KUMAR	ADDL. SP	ADCP SECURITY
5	RAJ KUMAR SINGH	DSP	ACP HQ
6	AMIT KUMAR SRIVASTAVA	DSP	ACP SECURITY KVM-GVM
7	VIKAS SRIVASTAVA	DSP	ACP TRAFFIC
8	ANJANI KUMAR RAI	DSP	ACP SURAKSHA
9	AJAY KUMAR SRIVASTAVA	DSP	ACP RAJATALAB
10	DR. ATUL ANJAAN TRIPATHI	DSP	ACP SARNATH
11	DHANANJAY MISHRA	DSP	ACP BHELUPUR
12	GAURAV KUMAR	DSP	ACP CYBER & WOMEN CRIME, EOW
13	VIDUSH SAXENA	DSP	ACP CANTT
14	MISS. PRAGYA PATHAK	DSP	ACP DASHASHWMEDH
15	AMIT KUMAR PANDEY	DSP	ACP KOTWALI
16	PRATEEK KUMAR	DSP	ACP PINDRA
17	SANJEEV KUMAR SHARMA	DSP	ACP ROHANIYA

== Commissioner of Police ==
Commissioner of Varanasi Police
- वाराणसी पुलिस आयुक्त
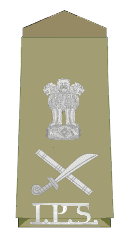
- Incumbent; Mohit Agarwal since 11 March 2023
- Abbreviation: CP
- Residence: Varanasi Cantonment Area
- Appointer: Department Of Home & Confidential
- First holder: A. Satish Ganesh
- Deputy: Addl. Commissioner of Police

There have been two commissioners of Varanasi Police since its formation as a commissionerate on May 25, 2021. The first one is A. Satish Ganesh, a 1996 batch IPS officer and the present Commissioner is ADG Ashok Mutha Jain, a 1995 batch IPS officer of the Uttar Pradesh cadre, who took office on November 29, 2022.

List of Commissioner of Police
S. No	Name	Rank	From	To	Note
1	A. Satish Ganesh	ADG	25 March 2021	28 November 2022	First CP of Varanasi
2	Mutha Ashok Jain	ADG	29 November 2022	11 March 2023	
3	Mohit Agarwal	ADG	11 March 2023	**	

== See also ==
- Varanasi
- Uttar Pradesh Police
- Lucknow City Police
