= Ghaziabad Police Commissionerate =

Police Department of Ghaziabad, Uttar Pradesh

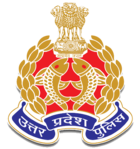
- Ghaziabad Police Commissionerate
- Motto: सुरक्षा आपकी, संकल्प हमारा (Hindi); Your Safety, Our Pledge

Agency overview
- Formed: 26 November 2022; 3 years ago

Jurisdictional structure
- Operations jurisdiction: Ghaziabad, India
- Legal jurisdiction: Ghaziabad
- Governing body: Department of Home; Uttar Pradesh Government
- General nature: Local civilian police

Operational structure
- Headquarters: Office of Commissioner of Police, Ghaziabad
- Minister responsible: Yogi Adityanath (Chief Minister), Minister of Home
- Agency executive: J. Ravindar Gaud (IPS), Commissioner of Police
- Parent agency: Uttar Pradesh Police

The Ghaziabad Police Commissionerate is the primary law enforcement agency for the city of Ghaziabad in the Indian state of Uttar Pradesh. It is a unit of the Uttar Pradesh Police and has the primary responsibilities of law enforcement and investigation within the limits of Ghaziabad. It is headed by the Commissioner of Police (CP), who is an IPS officer of IGP rank.

IPS Ajay Kumar Mishra was the First and J. Ravindar Gaud is the current police commissioner of Ghaziabad.

== History ==
Before November 2022, Ghaziabad District Police came under Ghaziabad Police Zone and Ghaziabad Police Range of Uttar Pradesh Police. Ghaziabad zone is headed by an IPS officer in the rank of Additional Director General of Police (ADG), whereas the Ghaziabad range is headed by an IPS officer in the rank of Inspector General of Police (IG).

On 26 November 2022, state's cabinet passed the order of making 3 more police commissionerates in the state after the success of previous 4 police commissionerates in other cities of the state.

1. Ghaziabad
2. Agra and
3. Prayagraj

== See also ==
- Ghaziabad
- Uttar Pradesh Police
- Lucknow Police
