= O. P. Singh =

Former Director General of Uttar Pradesh Police

OP Singh
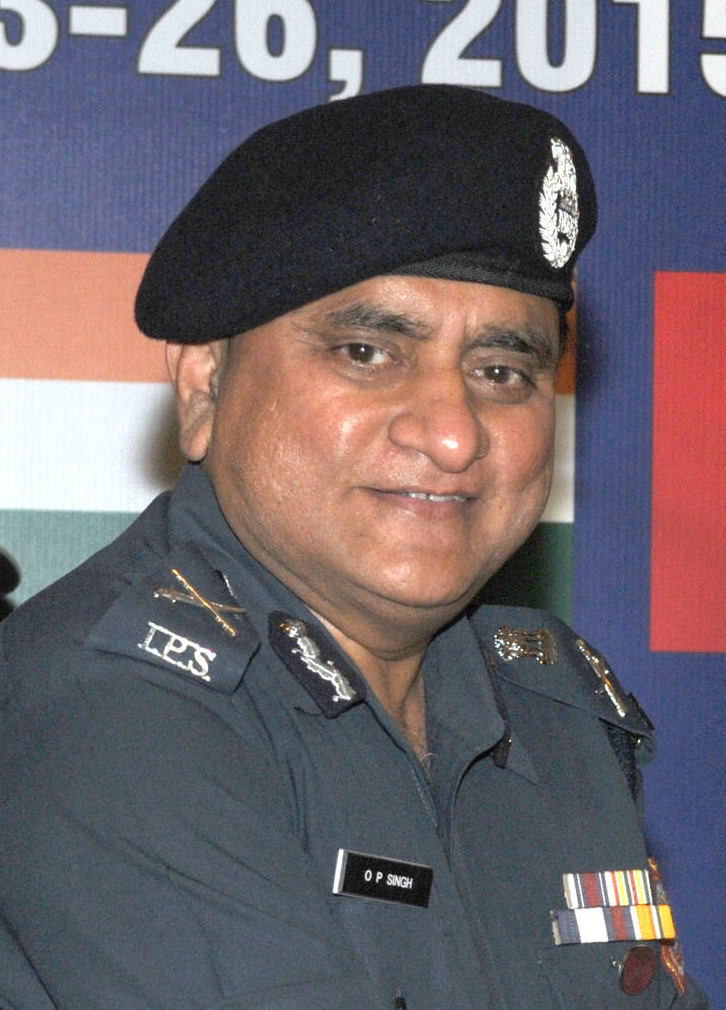

Director General of Uttar Pradesh Police
- In office 23 January 2018 – 31 January 2020
- Preceded by: Sulkhan Singh
- Succeeded by: Hitesh Chandra Awasthi

Director General of Central Industrial Security Force (CISF)
- In office 26 September 2016 – 21 January 2018

Director General of National Disaster Response Force (NDRF)
- In office 3 December 2014 – 25 September 2016
- Preceded by: Mahboob Alam
- Succeeded by: R. K. Pachnanda

Personal details
- Born: 2 January 1960 (age 66) Gaya, Bihar, India
- Education: St. Xavier's College; National Defence College; Sir Sundar Lal Hostel, Allahabad University; Madras University
- Awards: President's Police Medal for Distinguished Service; Police Medal for Meritorious Service; 50th Anniversary Independence Medal; Police Medal for Gallantry
- Police career
- Department: Uttar Pradesh Police, Central Industrial Security Force, National Disaster Response Force, Central Reserve Police Force
- Service years: 1983–2020
- Rank: Director General of Police

OP Singh (born 2 January 1960) is a 1983 batch IPS officer of Uttar Pradesh cadre. He was the Director General of Uttar Pradesh Police, and had previously served as the Director General of CISF and Director General of NDRF.

== Education ==
OP Singh has a postgraduate (MA) in Political Science from Delhi University, he also holds a postgraduate degree (MPhil) in International Relations from National Defence College, affiliated to Madras University. Singh has also earned MBA degree in Disaster Management.

== Career ==
OP Singh has served in various key positions for both Union and Uttar Pradesh Governments (Police), like as the Director General of Uttar Pradesh Police, Additional Director General (Intelligence), Additional Director General (Special Enquiry), Deputy Inspector General (DIG) of Moradabad and Azamgarh ranges, Deputy Inspector General (Anti Corruption Organization) and Commandant of 11th Battalion of Provincial Armed Constabulary in Uttar Pradesh Governments (Police), and as Director General of Central Industrial Security Force (CISF), Director General of National Disaster Response Force (NDRF), Additional Director General in CISF, Inspector General/Deputy Inspector General (IG/DIG) in Central Reserve Police Force.

Singh has also served as the District Senior Superintendent of Police/Superintendent of Police (SSP/SP) of Lucknow, Allahabad, Moradabad, Lakhimpur Kheri, Bulandshahr and Almora.

=== DG of CISF ===
He was appointed as the Director General of Central Industrial Security Force by the Appointments Committee of the Cabinet in September 2016. He assumed the office of DG on 26 September 2016.

=== DG of UPP ===
OP Singh assumed charge as the Director General of Uttar Pradesh Police on 23 January 2018.

He was appointed as the Director General of Uttar Pradesh Police by the Chief Minister of Uttar Pradesh, on the recommendation of a high-level committee consisting of the Chief Secretary of Uttar Pradesh, Rajive Kumar, as its head, with the other members being Principal Secretary (Home) Arvind Kumar and Principal Secretary to the Chief Minister, Shashi Prakash Goyal.

== Decorations ==
- Police Medal for meritorious service - Received on 15 August 1999
- President's Police Medal for distinguished service - Received on 26 January 2007
- 50th Independence Anniversary Medal - Received on 15 August 1997
- Police Medal for Gallantry - Received in 1993

== Controversies ==
Singh was the Senior Superintendent of Police (SSP) of Lucknow district when the infamous attack on Mayawati in a VIP guesthouse happened. Subsequently, he was suspended by the Government of Uttar Pradesh.

During his tenure as Additional Director General (ADG) of Meerut (NCR) zone, violence in Phase-II of Noida city happened. Subsequently, he was transferred by the Government of Uttar Pradesh and was attached to DGP Headquarters.
