= Javeed Ahmad =

Indian police officer

Director General of Provincial Armed Constabulary
- In office 22 April 2017 – 6 June 2017
- Preceded by: Office established
- Succeeded by: Office abolished

Director General of Uttar Pradesh Police
- In office 1 January 2016 – 21 April 2017
- Preceded by: Jagmohan Yadav
- Succeeded by: Sulkhan Singh

Personal details
- Born: 15 March 1960 (age 66) Patna, Bihar
- Education: St Stephen's College, Delhi University
- Occupation: IPS officer
- Awards: President's Police Medal for Distinguished Service; Police Medal for Meritorious Service; 50th Anniversary Independence Medal

Javed Ahmad is a 1984 batch retired Indian Police Service (IPS) officer of Uttar Pradesh cadre.

== Education ==
Ahmad has graduate and postgraduate degrees in history (BA and MA) from St. Stephen's College, Delhi.

== Career ==
Ahmad has served in various key positions for both the Uttar Pradesh Government (Police) and Union government. He has served as the director general of Uttar Pradesh Police, director general of Provincial Armed Constabulary, director general of Uttar Pradesh Government Railway Police, inspector general/secretary in the Department of Home and Confidential of the Uttar Pradesh Government, inspector general of the Central Zone of Provincial Armed Constabulary, deputy inspector general of Mirzapur range, and district senior superintendent of police/superintendent of police of Jaunpur, Balia, Ghazipur and Pauri Garhwal districts in the Uttar Pradesh government. He has served as the director of NICFS (in the rank of director general), joint director of CBI (in the rank of inspector general), deputy inspector general in CBI, and superintendent of police in CBI in the Union government.

== Decorations ==
The major decorations to Ahmad are:

- President's Police Medal for Distinguished Service - received on 15 August 2008
- Police Medal for Meritous Service - received on 26 January 2000
- 50th Independence Anniversary Medal - received on 15 August 1997

== See also ==
- Law enforcement in India
