= State Disaster Response Force (Uttar Pradesh) =

Indian specialized force, Indian Police Force, Indian Government Organization

State Disaster Response Force Uttar Pradesh Police
- SDRF UP Police
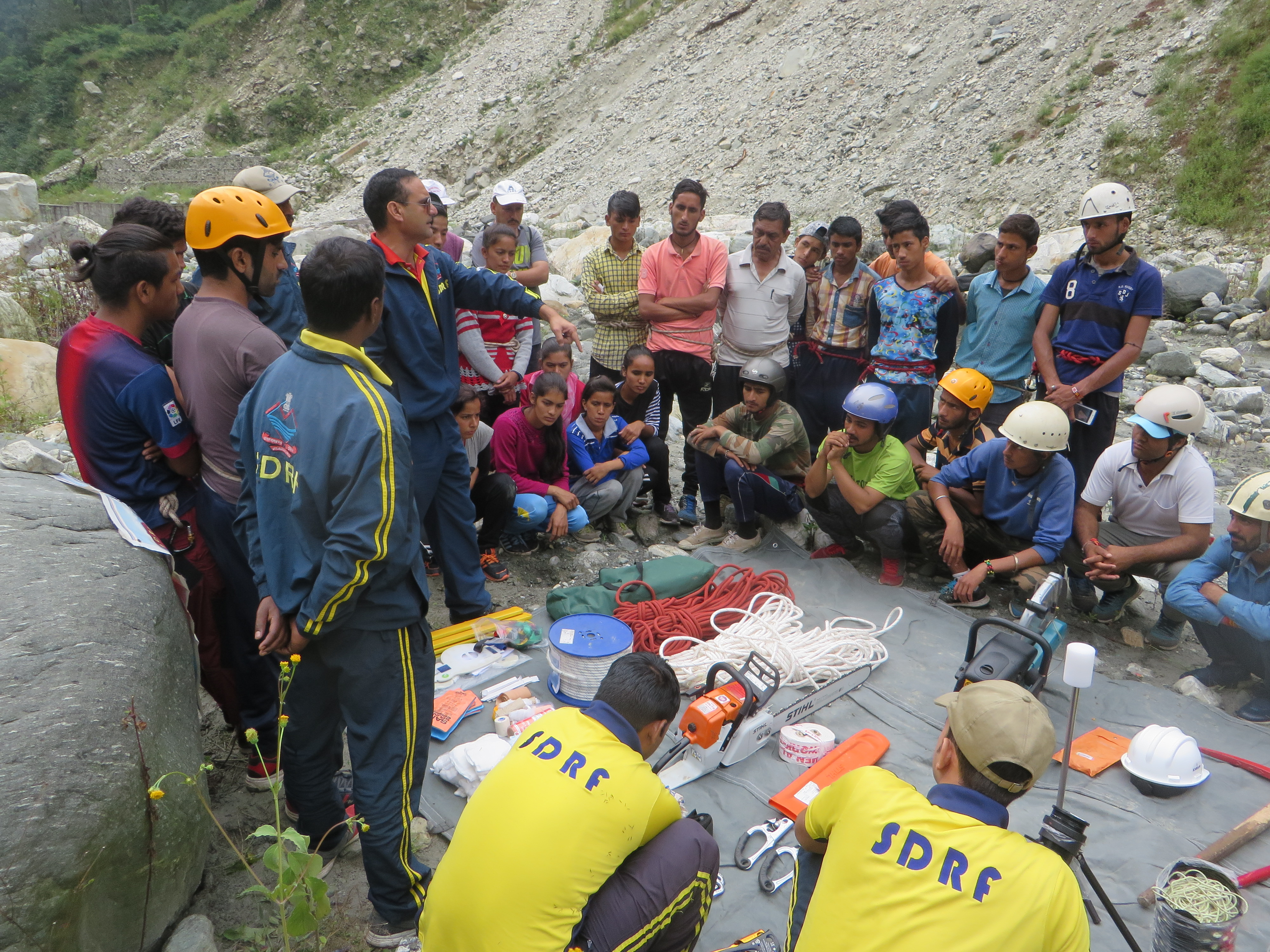
- Mock-up drill by State Disaster Response Force

Agency overview
- Formed: 2016; 10 years ago
- Jurisdiction: Government of Uttar Pradesh
- Headquarters: Lucknow
- Motto: " We Serve to Save "
- Minister responsible: Yogi Adityanath , , Chief Minister
- Agency executives: Prashant Kumar, IPS, Director General of Police; Sujeet Kumar Pandey,, ADG PAC, Uttar Pradesh; Dr. Satish Kumar, Commandant SDRF Uttar Pradesh
- Parent department: Uttar Pradesh Police , Home Department, Govt of Uttar Pradesh
- Website: https://sdrfup.in

State Disaster Response Force Uttar Pradesh Police is a Specialized Force of Uttar Pradesh Police formed in 2016 with the aim of strengthening the state's disaster management capabilities and responding effectively to disasters and emergencies.

== Background ==
Every year, Uttar Pradesh faces different types of disasters, and there's a concern that it might face more in the future. This could be because of climate change, population changes, people's social and economic conditions, cities growing without a plan, and development happening in risky areas or places prone to natural hazards.

To handle these situations, the Chief Secretary of the Uttar Pradesh Government issued an order on November 28, 2016. This order led to the creation of the Uttar Pradesh Disaster Management Authority, following the rules of the National Disaster Management Act of 2005. To further comply with the National Disaster Management Policy of 2009, and the National Disaster Management Plan, the State Disaster Response Force was established. This force is meant to help with relief and rescue efforts during disasters.

== Organizational structure ==
State Disaster Response Force Uttar Pradesh operates under the command of the Director General of Police (DGP) of Uttar Pradesh Police, and is divided into several battalions based in different regions of the state.

== Selection & Training ==
The State Disaster Response Force Uttar Pradesh manages and responds to disasters that occur within the state of India. The selection process of the SDRF in Uttar Pradesh is said to be rigorous and demanding. The SDRF election and training program is specially designed and jonitored by The Director-General of Police, Uttar Pradesh.

Selection : The SDRFUP is composed of personnel from the armed battalion of Uttar Pradesh Police on deputation for 5 years. All personnel who are deputed to SDRFUP get a 30% additional risk allowance.

Training : The training process for the SDRF in Uttar Pradesh is designed to equip the personnel with the necessary skills and knowledge to respond to various types of disasters. The training program includes both theoretical and practical training. The training is conducted by experienced trainers who have expertise in disaster management. Recently The state Government Announced To create a Disaster Relief Training Centre in Uttar Pradesh.

== Deployment ==
The SDRF UP Jawans are deployed in the strategic Location in the States. At Present There are 6 Companies SDRF UP. And the Government of Uttar Pradesh has announced to create 3 new SDRF units.

The Jawans of SDRF UP are deployed in various duties such as Water petroling, Ayodhya Temple's Innermost Zone and various Law & Order and other duties.

== Achievements ==
In recent years, the SDRF has played a crucial role in responding to several disasters and emergencies in the state, For That reasons the state Government is Trying to strengthen The SDRF.

In 2020, during the COVID-19 pandemic, the force played a vital role in managing the crisis, providing assistance to affected communities, and ensuring the implementation of lockdown measures.

Flood Response: The SDRF in Uttar Pradesh has been very effective in managing and responding to floods in the state. In 2019 & 2022, when the state was hit by severe flooding, the SDRF personnel were at the forefront of the rescue and relief operations. They rescued more than 5,000 people, provided medical assistance, and distributed food and water to those affected by the floods.

Earthquake Response: In 2021, when a powerful earthquake struck the state, the SDRF personnel were quick to respond. They carried out search and rescue operations, provided medical assistance, and helped in the evacuation of people from affected areas.

Cyclone Response: The SDRF in Uttar Pradesh also played a crucial role in managing the impact of Cyclone Tauktae in 2021. The force evacuated people from low-lying areas, provided medical assistance, and distributed relief materials.

Building Collapse Response: The SDRF personnel have also been effective in managing building collapse incidents in the state. In 2023 the rescue operation in Insident of Building collapses in In UP's Barabanki & Sambhal was successfully done by SDRF UP personals.

In addition to this SDRF UP has also been involved in several other significant rescue and relief operations, including the floods in Gorakhpur in 2017, the chemical factory explosion in Kanpur in 2019, and the rescue of trapped miners in Sonbhadra in 2021.

== See also ==
- Uttar Pradesh Police
- National Disaster Response Force
- State Disaster Response Force (Uttarakhand)
