= V. K. B. Nair =

Indian police chief (1947–2022)

V. K. Balan Nair (1947–2022) was the head of Uttar Pradesh Police from 28 June 2003 to 11 Jan 2005.

He received the Indian Police Medal for meritorious service and President's Police Medal for distinguished service. He was an IPS officer of the 1971 cadre.
