= Sulkhan Singh =

Indian police officer

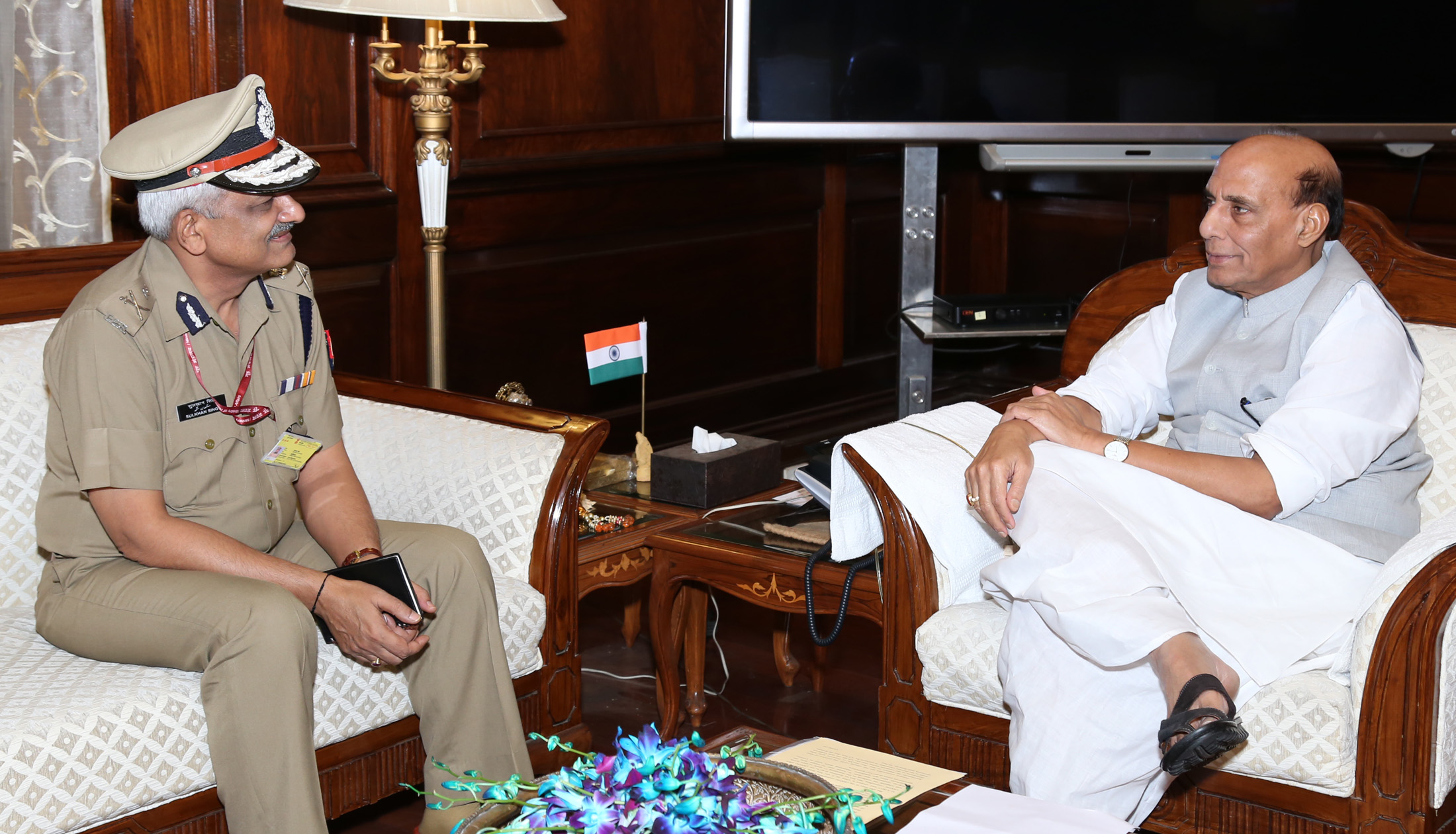
- Sulkhan Singh with Union Home Minister, Rajnath Singh, in New Delhi

Director General of Uttar Pradesh Police
- In office 22 April 2017 – 31 December 2017
- Preceded by: S. Javeed Ahmad
- Succeeded by: O.P. Singh

Director General of Uttar Pradesh Police Training Directorate
- In office 11 April 2015 – 21 April 2017

Personal details
- Born: 8 September 1957 (age 69) Banda, Uttar Pradesh, India
- Education: IIT Roorkee; IIT Delhi; University of Lucknow (LL.B, 2008)
- Occupation: IPS Officer
- Awards: President's Police Medal for Distinguished Service; Police Medal for Meritorious Service; 50th Anniversary Independence Medal; Union Home Minister’s Medals for excellence in Police Training

Sulkhan Singh (born 8 September 1957) is a retired Indian Police Service (IPS) officer belonging to Uttar Pradesh cadre. He was the Director General of Uttar Pradesh Police.

== Education ==
Singh has a graduate degree in Civil Engineering (BTech/B.E.) from IIT Roorkee (then University of Roorkee), a post graduate diploma in Structural Engineering from IIT Delhi. He also pursued law from LU between 2005 and 2008.

== Career ==
Sulkhan Singh has served in various key positions for Uttar Pradesh Government (Police), including as the Director General (DG) of Uttar Pradesh Police, Director General of Training Directorate, Additional Director General (ADG) (Police Headquarters) in Allahabad, Additional Director General/Inspector General/Secretary (ADG/IG) in Department of Prison administration and reform of Uttar Pradesh Government, Inspector General (IG) of Lucknow Zone, Deputy Inspector General of Lucknow, Allahabad and Mirzapur ranges, and as District Senior Senior Superintendent of Police/Superintendent of Police (SSP/SP) of Agra, Allahabad, Saharanpur, and Rampur districts.

Singh was given extension of three months in September 2017 to serve as Director General of Uttar Pradesh Police till December.

Singh retired on 31 December 2017.

== Political career ==
In November 2023, Sulkhan Singh launched Bundelkhand Loktantrik Party to promote the cause of separate statehood to Bundelkhand, a cultural plateau region in central India divided between Uttar Pradesh and Madhya Pradesh, which has long been under stress from migration, drought and little industrialization, the region has argued for a separate state on the basis of its economic marginalization and its cultural and linguistic differences from both Uttar Pradesh and Madhya Pradesh since at least the 1960s. The party fielded candidates in the 2024 Indian general election but remained a marginalized force. Singh is still active in the Bundelkhand statehood movement.

== Decorations ==
- Police Medal for meritorious service - Received on 15 August 1998
- President's Police Medal for distinguished service - Received on 15 August 2006
- 50th Independence Anniversary Medal - Received on 15 August 1997
- Union Home Minister’s Medals for excellence in Police Training - Received on 8 September 2017
