= Arun Kumar Gupta =

Indian police officer

Director General of Uttar Pradesh Police
- In office 1 January 2015 – 31 January 2015
- Preceded by: Anand Lal Banarjee
- Succeeded by: Arvind Kumar Jain

Personal details
- Occupation: Retired IPS Officer

Arun Kumar Gupta is a retired IPS officer. He was the Director General of Uttar Pradesh Police for a month in the Akhilesh Yadav Government.

== Indian Police Service ==
He is a 1977-batch Indian Police Service IPS officer.

== Previous posting ==
- Director General of Police of Police Recruitment and Promotion Board.

== Awards ==
- In 2003, he has been awarded Police Medal for Meritorious Service.

== See also ==
- Law enforcement in India
