= Jagmohan Yadav =

Indian police official (born 1955)

Director General of Uttar Pradesh Police
- In office 1 July 2015 – 31 December 2015
- Preceded by: Arvind Kumar Jain
- Succeeded by: S. Javeed Ahmad

Director General of Crime Branch-Crime Investigation Department (CB-CID)
- In office 31 December 2014 – 30 June 2015

Personal details
- Born: 30 December 1955 (age 70) Jaunpur, Uttar Pradesh
- Education: Allahabad University
- Occupation: IPS Officer
- Awards: President's Police Medal for Distinguished Service; Police Medal for Meritorious Service; 50th Anniversary Independence Medal
- Police career
- Department: Uttar Pradesh Police
- Service years: 1983-2015
- Rank: Director General of Police

Yadav addressing a press conference

Jagmohan Yadav is a retired 1983 batch IPS officer belonging to Uttar Pradesh Cadre who has served as the Director General of Uttar Pradesh Police.

== Education ==
Yadav has a postgraduate degree in philosophy (MA:Philosophy) from Allahabad University.

== Career ==
Apart from serving as the Director General (DG) of Uttar Pradesh Police, Yadav served in key positions in Uttar Pradesh Government (Police) including as Additional Director General (Law and Order), Inspector General (IG) of Meerut, Bareilly and Gorakhpur Zones, Inspector General of Uttar Pradesh Special Task Force (UP STF), Deputy Inspector General (DIG) of Lucknow, Bareilly Gorakhpur Ranges. He also served as the Director General of CB-CID (Crime Branch-Criminal Investigation Department).

He was also the District Senior Superintendent of Police/Superintendent of Police (SSP/SP) of Kanpur, Agra, Saharanpur, Dehradun, Sitapur, Deoaria and Maharajganj districts.

Yadav retired on 31 December 2015.

== Decorations ==
- Police Medal for meritorious service - Received on 26 January 2000
- President's Police Medal for distinguished service - Received on 26 January 2011
- 50th Independence Anniversary Medal - Received on 15 August 1997

== See also ==
- Uttar Pradesh Police
