= Mukul Goel =

Indian police officer

Director General of Uttar Pradesh Police
- In office June 2021 – 11 May 2022
- Preceded by: Hitesh Chandra Awasthy
- Succeeded by: Devendra Singh Chauhan

Personal details
- Born: 22 February 1964 (age 62) Shamli, Uttar Pradesh
- Education: IIT Delhi
- Occupation: IPS Officer
- Awards: President's Police Medal for Distinguished Service; Police Medal for Meritorious Service; Police Medal for Gallantry
- Police career
- Department: Uttar Pradesh Police
- Service years: 1987−2024
- Rank: Director General of Police

Mukul Goel is a retired Indian civil servant. He is the former Director General civil defence at Indian state Uttar Pradesh and had previously served as the Additional Director General (ADG) of Border Security Force. He was suspended by the erstwhile Mayawati's government in 2007 for alleged irregularities in police recruitment. He is 1987 batch IPS officer of Uttar Pradesh cadre. On 11 May 2022 Uttar Pradesh Chief Minister Yogi Adityanath removed Director General of Police Mukul Goel from his post for inefficiency and neglecting his work. Thereafter, he worked as DGP (Civil Defence) at UP Police.

== Early life ==
He was born on 22 February 1964 in Shamli (earlier part of Muzaffarnagar district), Uttar Pradesh, India. He holds a Bachelor of Technology degree in Electrical engineering from IIT Delhi.

== Career ==
Mukul Goel served Uttar Pradesh Police in various capacities such as police chief of districts like Gorakhpur, Varanasi, Mainpuri, Azamgarh, Saharanpur and Meerut. He also served as Deputy inspector general of police (DIG) in Kanpur, Agra and Bareilly ranges. In 2013, he served as the Additional director general of police (Law and Order) after riots broke out in Muzaffarnagar and its neighboring districts. Later, he served as ADG of Criminal Investigation Department and ADG (Indian Railways). In 2016, Goel was appointed as the IG of Border Security Force and moved to New Delhi on deputation. In June 2021, the Yogi Adityanath-led Government of Uttar Pradesh appointed him as the Director General of Police of the state.

== Honours and decorations ==
- Police Medal for Gallantry, 2003
- Police Medal for Meritorious service, 2003
- President's Police Medal for Distinguished service, 2012

== Controversies ==
In 2000, he was suspended after the murder of BJP politician and legislator Nirbhay Pal Sharma during his tenure in Saharanpur as SSP. It was also alleged that Nirbhay Pal Sharma had called the police but the police did not respond on time.

In September 2007, Mukul Goel, along with other 24 IPS officers were suspended by then UP Chief minister Mayawati after various FIRs were lodged against them for alleged irregularities in the recruitment of Uttar Pradesh Provincial Armed Constabulary (PAC), Police and Radio wireless personnel. Later, they were reinstated when all the cases were withdrawn by then Akhilesh Yadav-led government in 2012 when Samajwadi Party (SP) came in power.
