= Vikram Singh (police officer) =

Indian Police Officer

Director General of Police of Uttar Pradesh
- In office June 2007 – September 2009
- Preceded by: G. L. Sharma
- Succeeded by: Karamvir Singh

Personal details
- Born: 22 May 1950 (age 75) Uttar Pradesh, India
- Parent(s): Shri Markandeya Singh and Smt. Lakshmi Devi
- Education: M.Sc., 1972; Ph.D.(Ecology), 1990
- Alma mater: Allahabad University; Kumaon University
- Occupation: Educationist, social activist, retired IPS officer
- Awards: President's Police Medal for Gallantry; Bar to President's Police Medal for Gallantry; Indian Police Medal for Gallantry; President's Police Medal for Distinguished Services; Indian Police Medal for Long and Meritorious Services; Kathin Seva Medal; Bar to Kathin Seva Medal

Dr. Vikram Singh (born 22 May 1950) is an Indian educationist and retired Indian Police Service (IPS) officer. He joined the IPS in 1974 and held the post of Director General of Police in the state of Uttar Pradesh from June 2007 to September 2009. He retired from the IPS in May 2010.

== Summary of Experience ==
- Pro Chancellor – Noida International University (Plot No. 1, Sector 17-A, Yamuna Expressway, Gautam Buddha Nagar district, U.P.) – Since Jun'15 till date
- Vice Chancellor – Noida International University (Plot No. 1, Sector 17-A, Yamuna Expressway, Gautam Budh Nagar, U.P.) – Nov'10 Till Jun'15
- Director General – Home Guards – Sep'09 to May'10
- Director General of Police – Uttar Pradesh – Jun'07 to Sep'09
- Additional Director General – Central Industrial Security Force – Oct'06 to Jun'07
- Additional Director General – Inter State Border Force – Sep'03 to Oct'06
- Additional Director General – Law & Order, Crime, Special Task Force – Oct'02 to Sep'03
- Inspector General – Varanasi Zone & Meerut Zone – Jul'01 – Oct'02
- Inspector General – Special Task Force, was responsible for establishing, starting and efficiently running this elite force for the first three years. Also, he established similar units in three other states. – Oct'97 to Jul'01
- Inspector General – Meerut Zone – Dec'96 to Oct'97
- Deputy Inspector General – Moradabad Range & Meerut Range – Oct'91 to Dec'96
- Senior Superintendent of Police – Etah, Nainital, Agra & Kanpur – Sep'81 to Feb'91
- Superintendent of Police – Agra & Hamirpur – Jun'79 to Sep'81
- ADC to Governor of Uttar Pradesh – Sep'77 to Jun'79
- Assistant Superintendent of Police – Mirzapur – Dec'76 to Sep'77
