= Uttar Pradesh Police =

Law enforcement agency of the Indian state of Uttar Pradesh

Uttar Pradesh Police उत्तर प्रदेश पुलिस
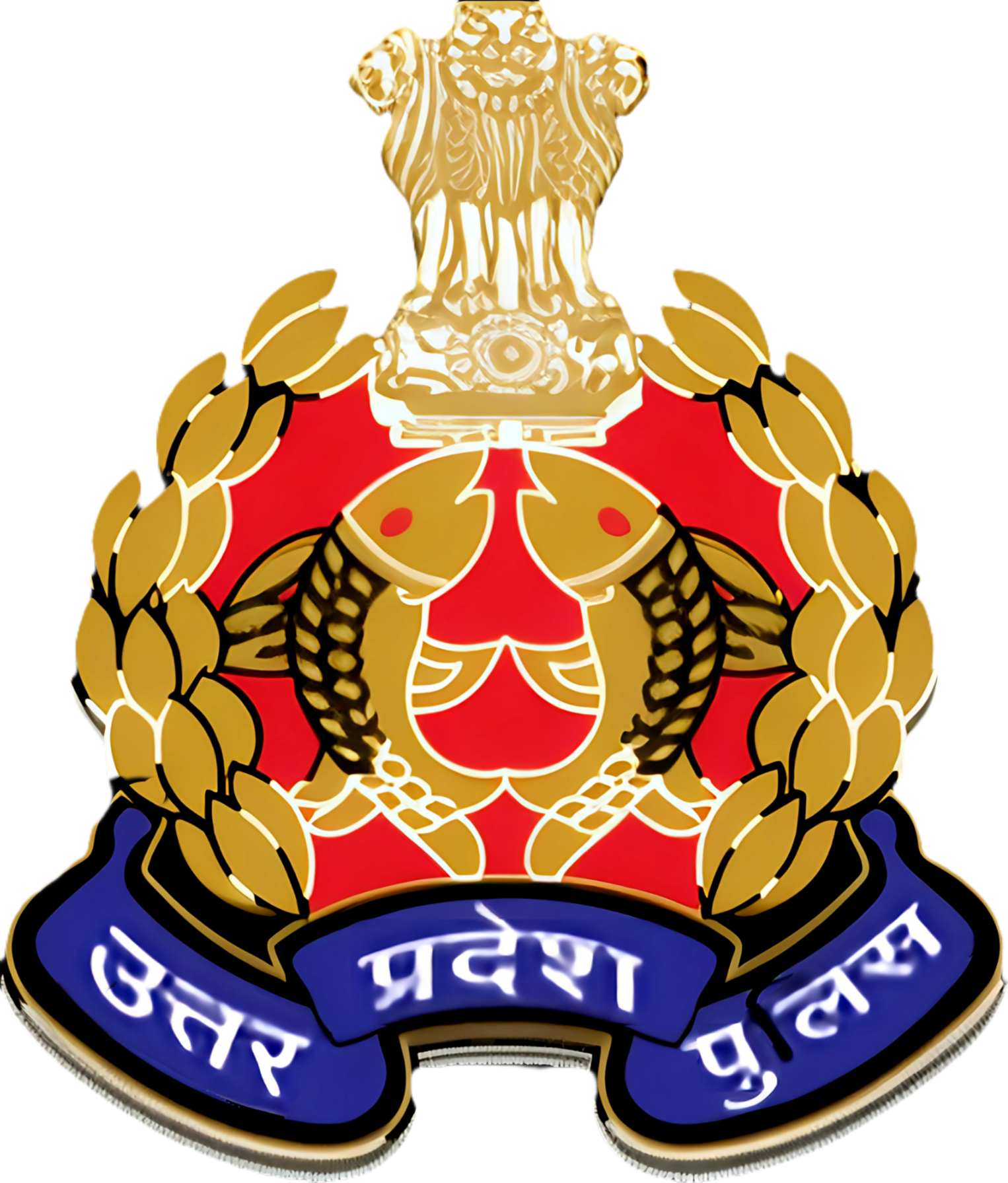
- Emblem of the Uttar Pradesh Police

- Flag of the Uttar Pradesh Police
- Abbreviation: UP Police
- Motto: "सुरक्षा आपकी, संकल्प हमारा" (Hindi) "Your protection, our pledge"

Agency overview
- Formed: 1863; 163 years ago; at Prayagraj erstwhile Allahabad
- Annual budget: ₹44,000 crore (US$4.7 billion) (2026–27)

Jurisdictional structure
- Operations jurisdiction: Uttar Pradesh, IN
- Jurisdiction of Uttar Pradesh Police force
- Area: 243,286 km^{2} (93,933.25 sq mi)
- Population: 199,812,341 (est. 2011)
- Legal jurisdiction: Uttar Pradesh
- Governing body: Home Department
- Constituting instrument: Police Act, 1861
- General nature: Civilian police

Operational structure
- Headquarters: Uttar Pradesh Police Headquarters, Sector-7, Gomti Nagar Extension, Lucknow, Uttar Pradesh
- Gazetted Officers: 1,369 (406 IPS officers and 963 PPS officers)
- Non-Gazetted officers and Constables: 310,000
- Minister responsible: Yogi Adityanath, Chief Minister and Minister of Home and Confidential
- Agency executive: Rajeev Krishna, IPS, Director General of Police
- Child agencies: Lucknow Police Commissionerate; Kanpur Nagar Police Commissionerate; Agra Police Commissionerate; Gautam Buddh Nagar Police Commissionerate; Ghaziabad Police Commissionerate; Prayagraj Police Commissionerate; Varanasi Police Commissionerate

Facilities
- Stations: 2,015 (as of September 2021)
- Helicopters: 1
- Dogs: 78

Website
- uppolice.gov.in

The Uttar Pradesh Police (Hindi: उत्तर प्रदेश पुलिस, IAST:Uttara Pradeśha Pulisa), colloquially known as the U.P. Police, is the primary law enforcement agency of the state of Uttar Pradesh, India. It was established in 1863 as the Office of the Inspector General of Police, United Provinces, under the "Police Act, 1861".

Uttar Pradesh Police is one of the oldest police departments in the Republic of India, and is the largest police force in the world, having about 68 district police department (excluding 7 commissionerates) in it.

The Uttar Pradesh Police is headquartered at Signature Building, Gomti Nagar Extension in Lucknow, having been previously located in the state's judicial capital: Prayagraj.

The Uttar Pradesh Police employ around 1,368 gazetted officers, and 231,443 non gazetted uniformed officers. Uttar Pradesh Police is governed by the Department of Home and Confidential of Uttar Pradesh. The Uttar Pradesh Police is headed by the Director General of Police (DGP) for the state of Uttar Pradesh, who is the highest-ranking (DG) IPS officer of the state cadre. UP Police is the first Indian state police agency to have a highway patrol Unit, the UP-Highway Police (UPHP).

== History ==
The present police system in the country was created following the recommendation of the Police Commission headed by Mr. H.M. Court in 1860, which led to the enactment of the Police Act of 1861 that is in force even today. The same Mr. Court became the first Inspector General of Police (IGP) of the then North West Province and Avadh which comprised the territory of the present state of Uttar Pradesh. The Police structure was erected in the form of the following eight organizations:

- Provincial Police
- Government Railway Police
- Municipal Police
- Cantonment Police
- Town Police
- Rural and Road Police
- Canal Police
- Barkandaj Guard (to protect the courts)

The Civil Police too continued to grow and Mr. B.N. Lahiri was the first Indian Inspector General of Police of Uttar Pradesh after independence. The performance of the state police in the spheres of Crime control and maintenance of law and order was highly appreciated, due to which it had the proud privilege of being the first police force in the country to receive the President's Color on 23 November 1952 by the then Prime Minister of India, Pt. Jawaharlal Nehru. Various specialized wings of the U.P. police have since come into existence for combating organized crimes, economic offences, terrorism, etc.

== Organization and structure ==
A Director General of Police (DGP) heads the state police. He is assisted by many police officers. State police headquarters is situated in Lucknow.

For the purpose of maintaining law and order in the state, the state of Uttar Pradesh is divided into 8 police zones. Each zone is headed by an officer of the rank of additional director general of police who is an officer of the Indian police Service. Each police zone is constituted by 2 to 3 police ranges. There are a total of 18 police ranges in the state of Uttar Pradesh. Each range is headed by an officer of the rank of either inspector general of police or deputy inspector general of police. Each police range is constituted by around 2 to 4 districts.

=== District Police Units ===
There are a total of 68 District police units (headed by SP/SSP) and 7 Police Commissionerate (headed by CP) in the state.

In each district (except all current 7 commissionerates), the head of the police is the SP or SSP. In the discharge of his duties, he is assisted by Superintendent of Police (SP), Deputy Superintendent of Police (Deputy SP) or Assistant Superintendent of Police who may either be the officers of the Provincial Police Service or Indian Police Service.

The number of SPs and Deputy SPs varies with the size, population, police work, or nature of police work in different districts. The number of SPs and Dy.SPs in districts like Gorakhpur, Bareilly, Meerut, Moradabad is considerably more than other districts. Whereas in smaller districts like Baghpat, Kannauj, Mahoba, Chandauli the number of the PPS officers is relatively lesser.

Typically, a police district in the state corresponds with the administrative district. Though, the head of the police force in the district is the Senior Superintendent of Police (SSP)/Superintendent of police (SP), who is always an officer of the Indian Police Service, the ultimate/final responsibility with regard to the maintenance of the law and order in the district lies with the district magistrate who is an officer of the Indian Administrative Service. The police district is further subdivided into police sub-divisions or police circles. A police circle is usually headed by an officer of the rank of Deputy Superintendent of Police or Assistant Superintendent of Police. The officer heading the police circle/sub-division is designated as the Circle Officer (C.O.) in the state of Uttar Pradesh. A police circle is usually constituted by 2 to 4 police stations. Each police station is headed by a police inspector. Throughout the state of Uttar Pradesh and other states, especially in North India, there is the main police station in the older/ main part of the city known as the Kotwali. The Kotwali covers the main or usually the older part of the town/city under its jurisdiction. Earlier, when the cities and towns were smaller and had a lesser population than at present and they hadn't grown in size so much, Kotwali covered the main town area of the cities or the districts. A police station is also called as a thana in the local language. The officer in charge of a police station is designated as or called as the station officer (S.O.) or station house officer (S.H.O). He is assisted by various sub-inspectors, head-constables, constables. There are also a number of police chowkis that come under the police station. A police chowki is under the charge of a sub-inspector of police. The regular constabulary carries the bulk of normal beat policing and patrolling.

=== Zones, Ranges and districts ===
List of the police zones, ranges and districts falling under them
| # | Zone | Headed by (post) | # | Range | Headed by (post) | # | District | Headed by (post) |
|---|---|---|---|---|---|---|---|---|
| 1 | Lucknow zone | ADG/IG | 1 | Lucknow | IG/DIG | 1 | Unnao | SP |
| 1 | Lucknow zone | ADG/IG | 1 | Lucknow | IG/DIG | 2 | Sitapur | SP |
| 1 | Lucknow zone | ADG/IG | 1 | Lucknow | IG/DIG | 3 | Hardoi | SP |
| 1 | Lucknow zone | ADG/IG | 1 | Lucknow | IG/DIG | 4 | Rae Bareli | SP |
| 1 | Lucknow zone | ADG/IG | 1 | Lucknow | IG/DIG | 5 | Kheri | SP |
| 1 | Lucknow zone | ADG/IG | 2 | Ayodhya | DIG | 1 | Ayodhya | SSP |
| 1 | Lucknow zone | ADG/IG | 2 | Ayodhya | DIG | 2 | Barabanki | SP |
| 1 | Lucknow zone | ADG/IG | 2 | Ayodhya | DIG | 3 | Sultanpur | SP |
| 1 | Lucknow zone | ADG/IG | 2 | Ayodhya | DIG | 4 | Ambedkar Nagar | SP |
| 1 | Lucknow zone | ADG/IG | 2 | Ayodhya | DIG | 5 | Amethi | SP |
| 2 | Bareilly zone | ADG/IG | 1 | Bareilly | IG/DIG | 1 | Bareilly | SSP |
| 2 | Bareilly zone | ADG/IG | 1 | Bareilly | IG/DIG | 2 | Shahjahanpur | SP |
| 2 | Bareilly zone | ADG/IG | 1 | Bareilly | IG/DIG | 3 | Pilibhit | SP |
| 2 | Bareilly zone | ADG/IG | 1 | Bareilly | IG/DIG | 4 | Badaun | SSP |
| 2 | Bareilly zone | ADG/IG | 2 | Moradabad | DIG | 1 | Moradabad | SSP |
| 2 | Bareilly zone | ADG/IG | 2 | Moradabad | DIG | 2 | Jyotiba Phule Nagar | SP |
| 2 | Bareilly zone | ADG/IG | 2 | Moradabad | DIG | 3 | Rampur | SP |
| 2 | Bareilly zone | ADG/IG | 2 | Moradabad | DIG | 4 | Bijnor | SP |
| 2 | Bareilly zone | ADG/IG | 2 | Moradabad | DIG | 5 | Sambhal | SP |
| 3 | Meerut zone | ADG/IG | 1 | Meerut | IG/DIG | 1 | Meerut | SSP |
| 3 | Meerut zone | ADG/IG | 1 | Meerut | IG/DIG | 2 | Baghpat | SP |
| 3 | Meerut zone | ADG/IG | 1 | Meerut | IG/DIG | 3 | Bulandshahr | SSP |
| 3 | Meerut zone | ADG/IG | 1 | Meerut | IG/DIG | 4 | Hapur | SP |
| 3 | Meerut zone | ADG/IG | 2 | Saharanpur | DIG | 1 | Saharanpur | SSP |
| 3 | Meerut zone | ADG/IG | 2 | Saharanpur | DIG | 2 | Muzaffarnagar | SSP |
| 3 | Meerut zone | ADG/IG | 2 | Saharanpur | DIG | 3 | Shamli | SP |
| 4 | Agra zone | ADG/IG | 1 | Agra | IG/DIG | 1 | Mathura | SSP |
| 4 | Agra zone | ADG/IG | 1 | Agra | IG/DIG | 2 | Firozabad | SP |
| 4 | Agra zone | ADG/IG | 1 | Agra | IG/DIG | 3 | Mainpuri | SP |
| 4 | Agra zone | ADG/IG | 2 | Aligarh | DIG | 1 | Aligarh | SSP |
| 4 | Agra zone | ADG/IG | 2 | Aligarh | DIG | 2 | Hathras | SP |
| 4 | Agra zone | ADG/IG | 2 | Aligarh | DIG | 3 | Etah | SSP |
| 4 | Agra zone | ADG/IG | 2 | Aligarh | DIG | 4 | Kasganj | SP |
| 5 | Kanpur zone | ADG/IG | 1 | Kanpur | IG/DIG | 1 | Kanpur Dehat | SP |
| 5 | Kanpur zone | ADG/IG | 1 | Kanpur | IG/DIG | 2 | Auraiya | SP |
| 5 | Kanpur zone | ADG/IG | 1 | Kanpur | IG/DIG | 3 | Kannauj | SP |
| 5 | Kanpur zone | ADG/IG | 1 | Kanpur | IG/DIG | 4 | Farrukhabad | SP |
| 5 | Kanpur zone | ADG/IG | 1 | Kanpur | IG/DIG | 5 | Etawah | SSP |
| 5 | Kanpur zone | ADG/IG | 2 | Jhansi | DIG | 1 | Jhansi | SSP |
| 5 | Kanpur zone | ADG/IG | 2 | Jhansi | DIG | 2 | Jalaun | SP |
| 5 | Kanpur zone | ADG/IG | 2 | Jhansi | DIG | 3 | Lalitpur | SP |
| 6 | Prayagraj zone | ADG/IG | 1 | Prayagraj | IG/DIG | 1 | Kaushambi | SP |
| 6 | Prayagraj zone | ADG/IG | 1 | Prayagraj | IG/DIG | 2 | Pratapgarh | SP |
| 6 | Prayagraj zone | ADG/IG | 1 | Prayagraj | IG/DIG | 3 | Fatehpur | SP |
| 6 | Prayagraj zone | ADG/IG | 2 | Chitrakoot Dham | DIG | 1 | Chitrakoot | SP |
| 6 | Prayagraj zone | ADG/IG | 2 | Chitrakoot Dham | DIG | 2 | Hamirpur | SP |
| 6 | Prayagraj zone | ADG/IG | 2 | Chitrakoot Dham | DIG | 3 | Banda | SP |
| 6 | Prayagraj zone | ADG/IG | 2 | Chitrakoot Dham | DIG | 4 | Mahoba | SP |
| 7 | Varanasi zone | ADG/IG | 1 | Varanasi | IG/DIG | 1 | Chandauli | SP |
| 7 | Varanasi zone | ADG/IG | 1 | Varanasi | IG/DIG | 2 | Jaunpur | SP |
| 7 | Varanasi zone | ADG/IG | 1 | Varanasi | IG/DIG | 3 | Ghazipur | SP |
| 7 | Varanasi zone | ADG/IG | 2 | Mirzapur | DIG | 1 | Mirzapur | SSP |
| 7 | Varanasi zone | ADG/IG | 2 | Mirzapur | DIG | 2 | Bhadohi | SP |
| 7 | Varanasi zone | ADG/IG | 2 | Mirzapur | DIG | 3 | Sonbhadra | SP |
| 7 | Varanasi zone | ADG/IG | 3 | Azamgarh | DIG | 1 | Azamgarh | SP |
| 7 | Varanasi zone | ADG/IG | 3 | Azamgarh | DIG | 2 | Mau | SP |
| 7 | Varanasi zone | ADG/IG | 3 | Azamgarh | DIG | 3 | Ballia | SP |
| 8 | Gorakhpur zone | ADG/IG | 1 | Gorakhpur | IG/DIG | 1 | Gorakhpur | SSP |
| 8 | Gorakhpur zone | ADG/IG | 1 | Gorakhpur | IG/DIG | 2 | Maharajganj | SP |
| 8 | Gorakhpur zone | ADG/IG | 1 | Gorakhpur | IG/DIG | 3 | Kushinagar | SP |
| 8 | Gorakhpur zone | ADG/IG | 1 | Gorakhpur | IG/DIG | 4 | Deoria | SP |
| 8 | Gorakhpur zone | ADG/IG | 2 | Basti | DIG | 1 | Basti | SP |
| 8 | Gorakhpur zone | ADG/IG | 2 | Basti | DIG | 2 | Sant Kabir Nagar | SP |
| 8 | Gorakhpur zone | ADG/IG | 2 | Basti | DIG | 3 | Siddharth Nagar | SP |
| 8 | Gorakhpur zone | ADG/IG | 3 | Devipatan | DIG | 1 | Gonda | SP |
| 8 | Gorakhpur zone | ADG/IG | 3 | Devipatan | DIG | 2 | Balrampur | SP |
| 8 | Gorakhpur zone | ADG/IG | 3 | Devipatan | DIG | 3 | Shravasti | SP |
| 8 | Gorakhpur zone | ADG/IG | 3 | Devipatan | DIG | 4 | Bahraich | SP |
| Total police zones | | 8 | Total police ranges | | 18 | Total police districts | | 68 |

=== Commissionerates ===
There are currently 7 police commissionerates under UP Police -

| SR No | Name | Commissioner of Police | CP's Rank | Formed | Reference |
|---|---|---|---|---|---|
| 1 | Lucknow Police | Tarun Gauba, IPS | ADGP | 14 January 2020 | |
| 2 | Gautam Buddha Nagar Police Commissionerate | Laxmi Singh, IPS | ADGP | 14 January 2020 | |
| 3 | Kanpur Nagar Police Commissionerate | RK Swarnakar, IPS | ADGP | 25 March 2021 | |
| 4 | Varanasi Police Commissionerate | Mohit Aggarwal, IPS | ADGP | 25 March 2021 | |
| 5 | Prayagraj Police Commissionerate | Piyush Mordia, IPS | ADGP | 26 November 2022 | |
| 6 | Agra Police Commissionerate | Dr Preetendar Singh, IPS | IGP | 26 November 2022 | |
| 7 | Ghaziabad Police Commissionerate | Ajay Mishra, IPS | IGP | 26 November 2022 | |

In the police commissionerate system, the Commissioner of Police (CP) in the rank of Additional Director General of Police (ADGP) or Inspector General of Police (IGP) heads the district police department or commissionerate.

In Lucknow Police, the CP is assisted by 2 Joint Commissioners of Police (JCPs) with the ranks of IG and DIG, in Kanpur Police the commissioner is assisted by 2 Additional Commissioners (Addl. CPs) in the ranks of IG and DIG who look after Law and order while other looks into Crime & Headquarters respectively, whereas in all other commissionerates the commissioner is assisted by Addl.CP(s) of DIG rank. Under them, there is a team of IPS & PPS officers who are posted as DCPs and ACPs. Three DCPs are posted in a zone. One DCP's insignia is the state emblem above one star, who is senior to the other two DCPs, whose insignia is one state emblem only. Under the DCPs work ACPs, who are the chiefs of various circles. They are vested with the powers of the executive magistrate for criminal cases.

Police Commissionerates are independent of zonal & range police chiefs' supervision. They are also vested with powers of an executive magistrate under various acts.

=== Hierarchy ===
==== Officers ====
- Director general of police (DGP)
- Additional Director General of Police (ADG)
- Inspector general of police (IG)
- Deputy inspector general of police (DIG)
- Senior Superintendent of Police (SSP)
- Superintendent of Police (SP)
- Additional Superintendent of Police (Addl. SP)
- Assistant Superintendent of Police (ASP)
- Deputy superintendent of police (DSP)

==== Subordinates ====
- Inspector of Police (PI)
- Sub-Inspector of police (SI)
- Assistant Sub-inspector of police (ASI)
- Head constable (HC)
- Police constable (PC)

== Ranks of law enforcement in Uttar Pradesh ==
Gazetted Officers

Indian Police Service cadre officers rank insignia
Insignia
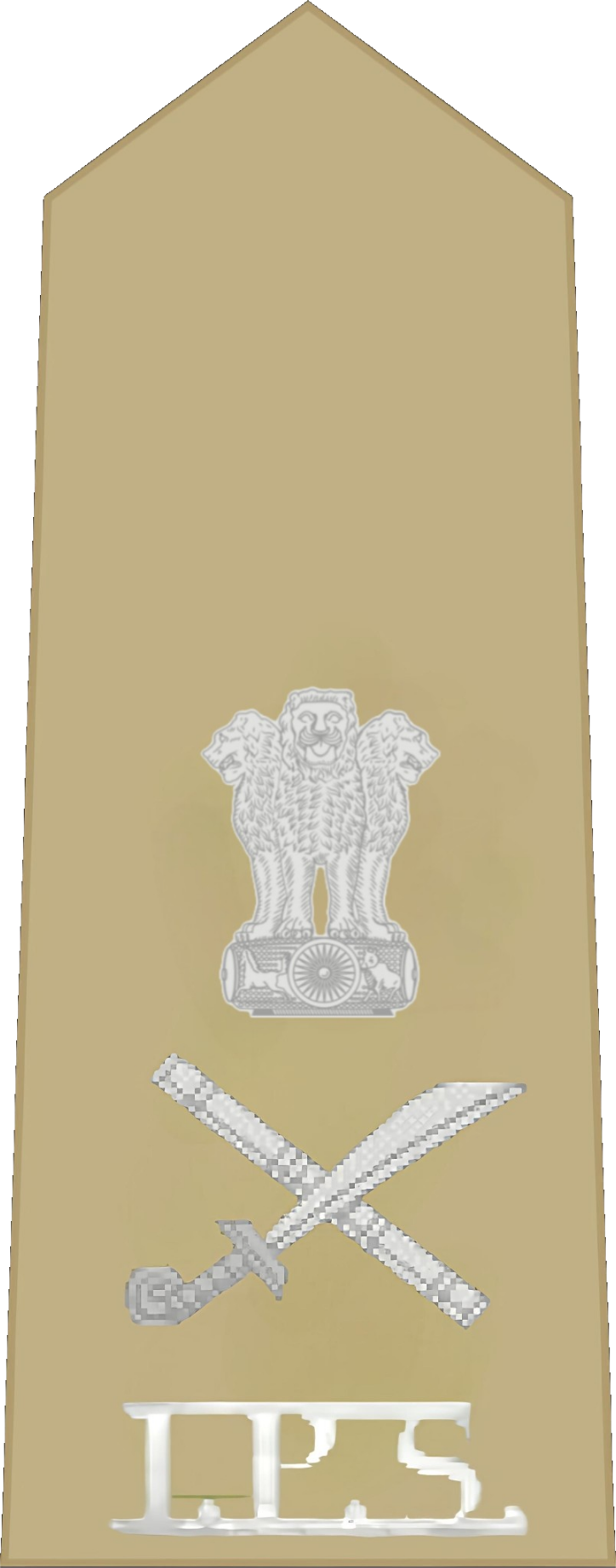
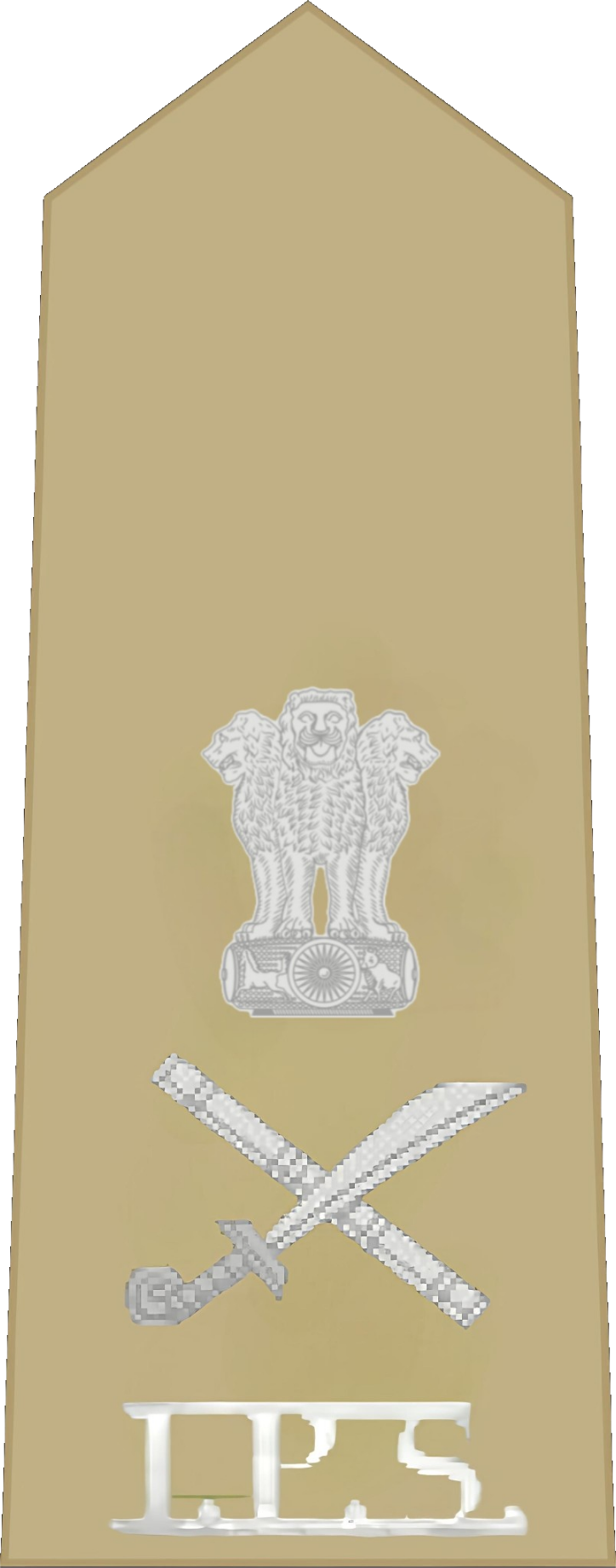
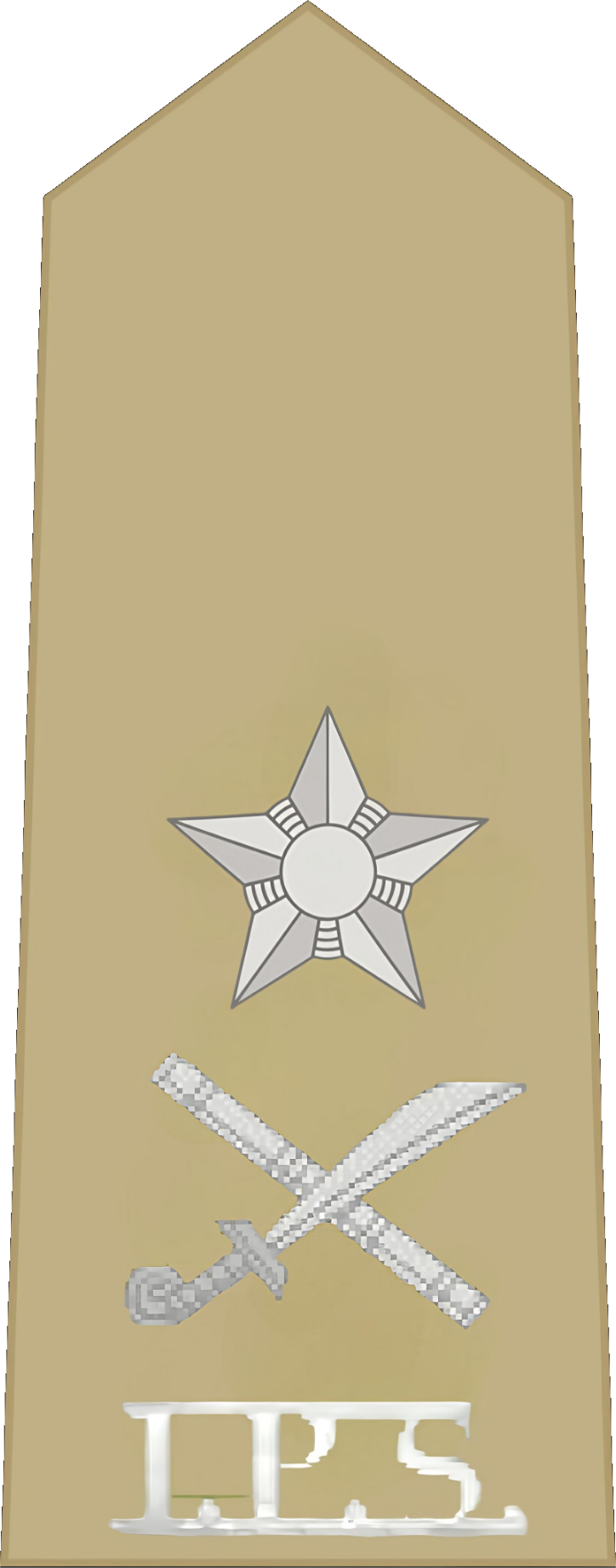
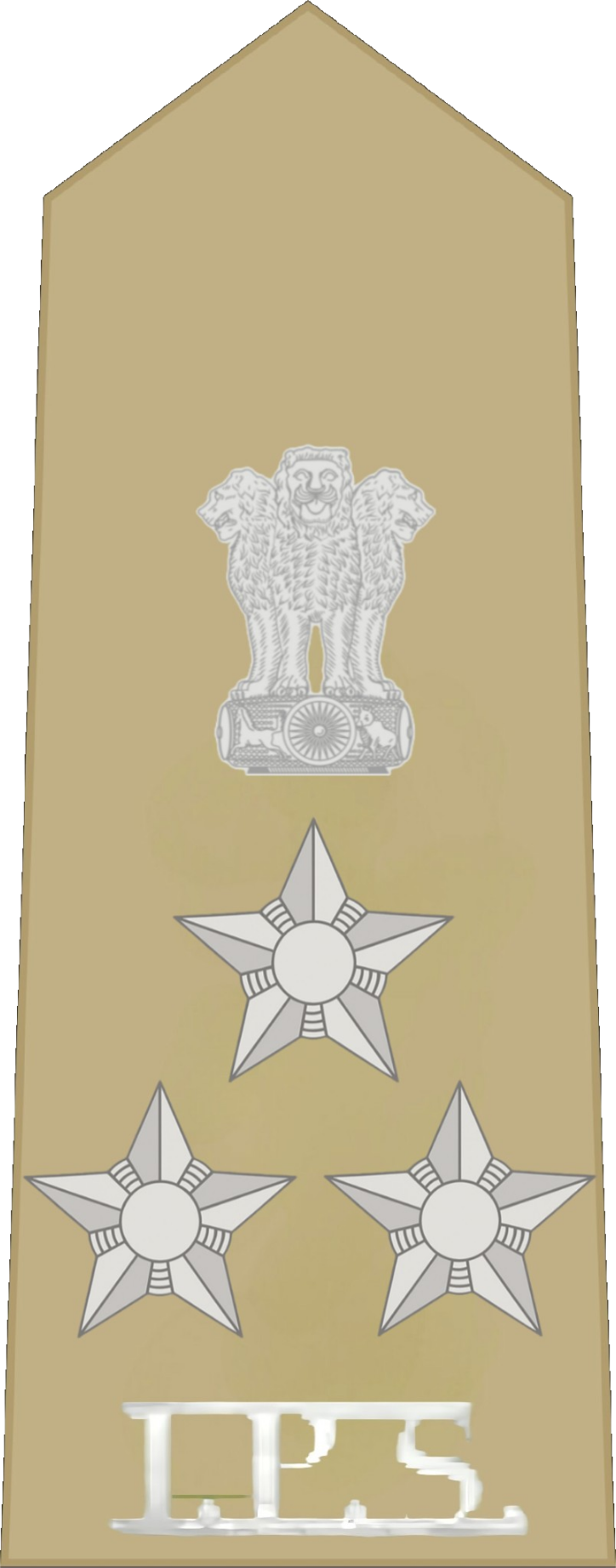
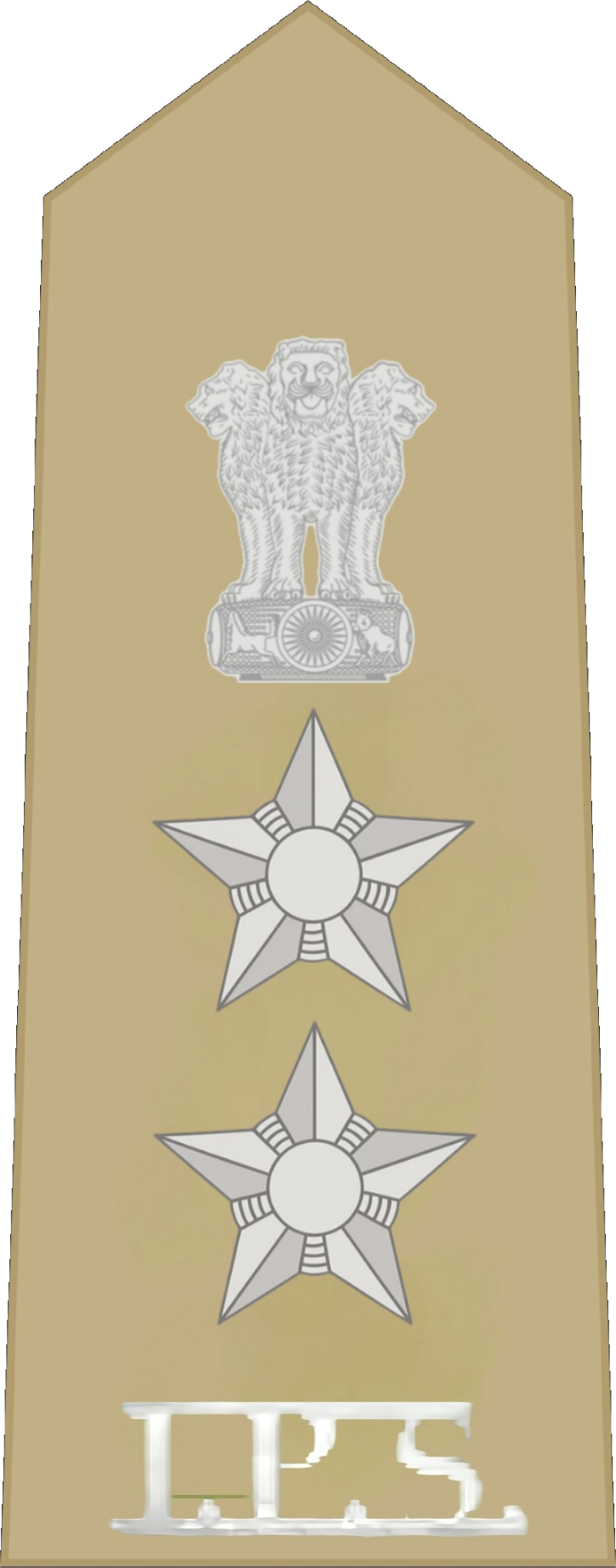
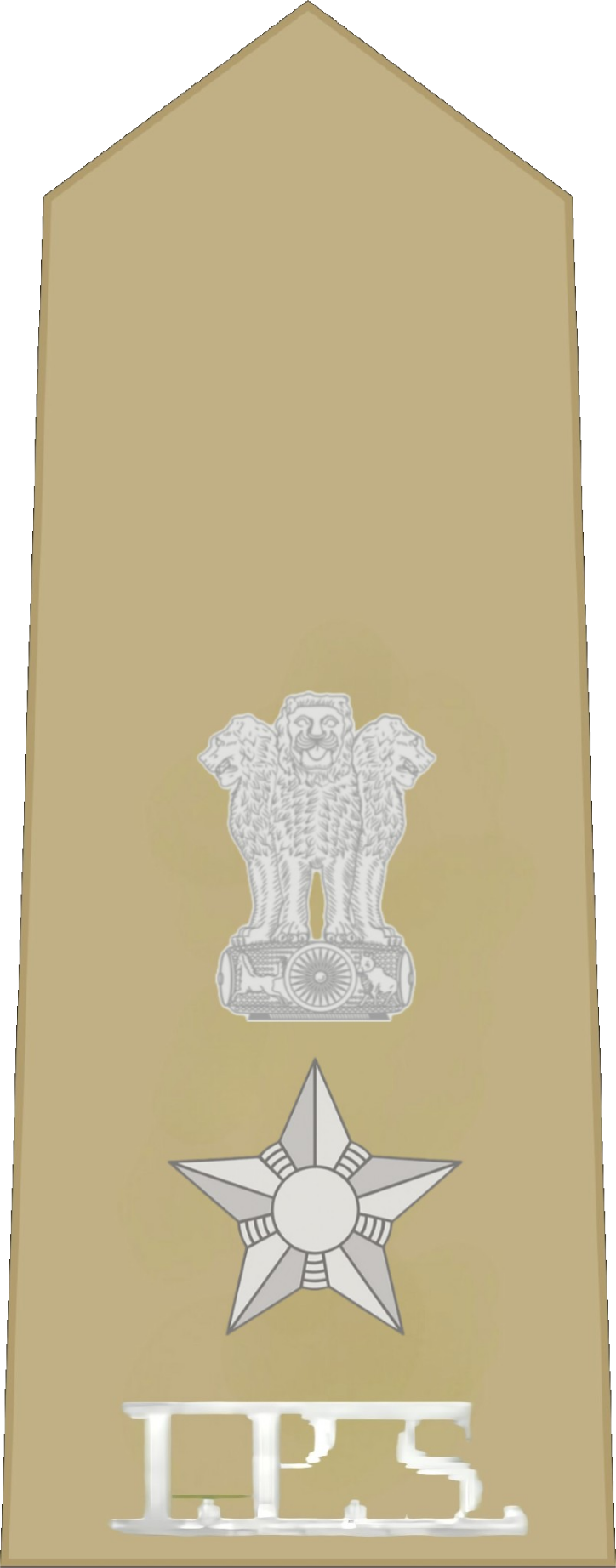
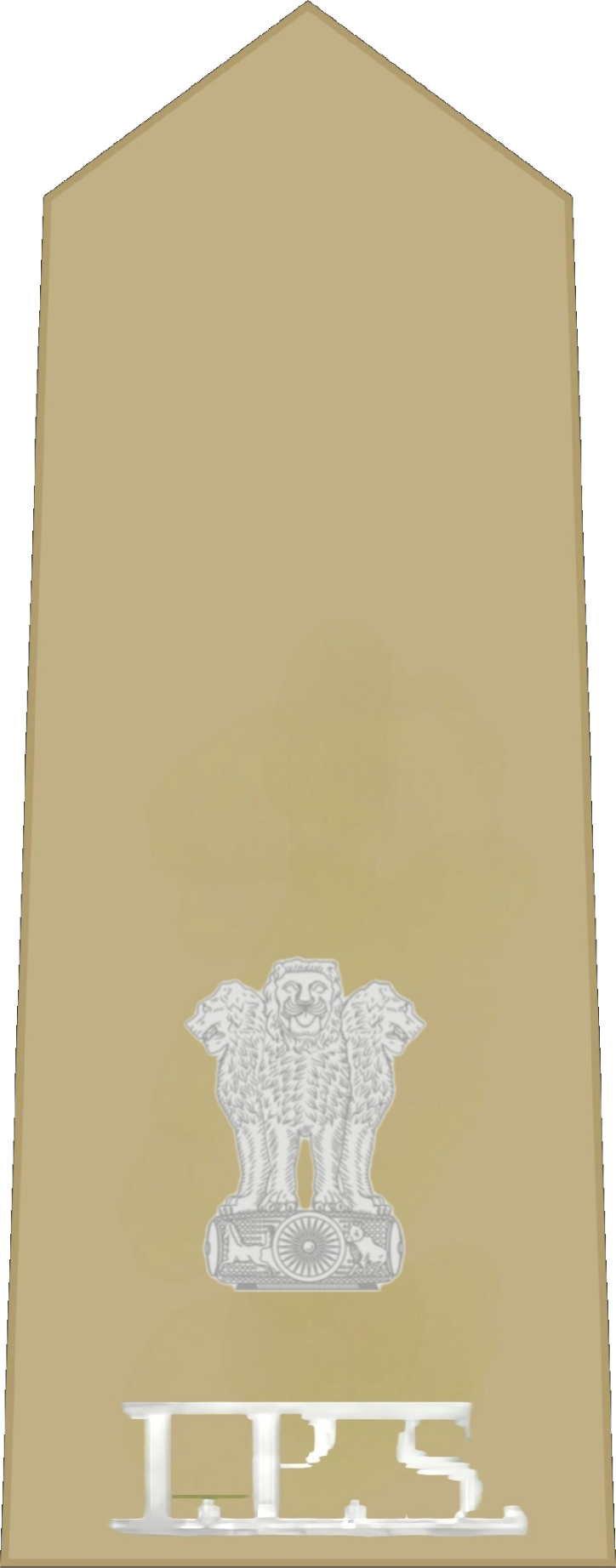
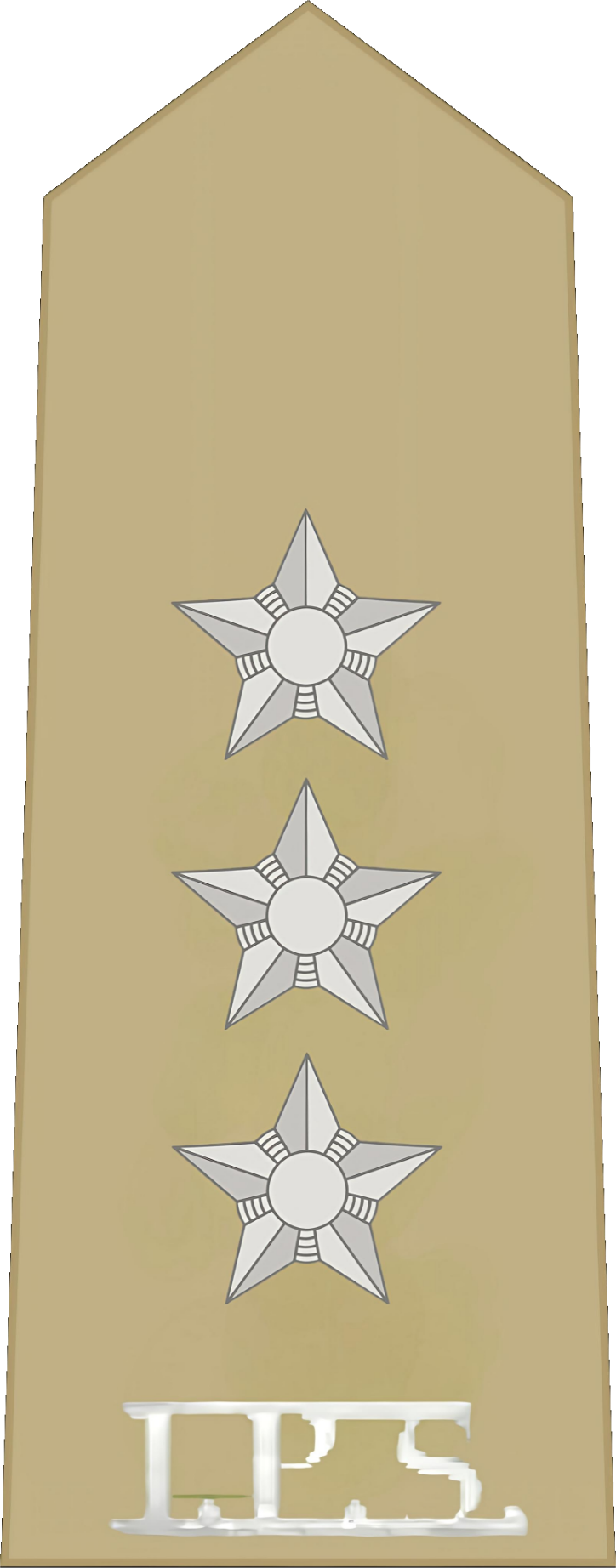
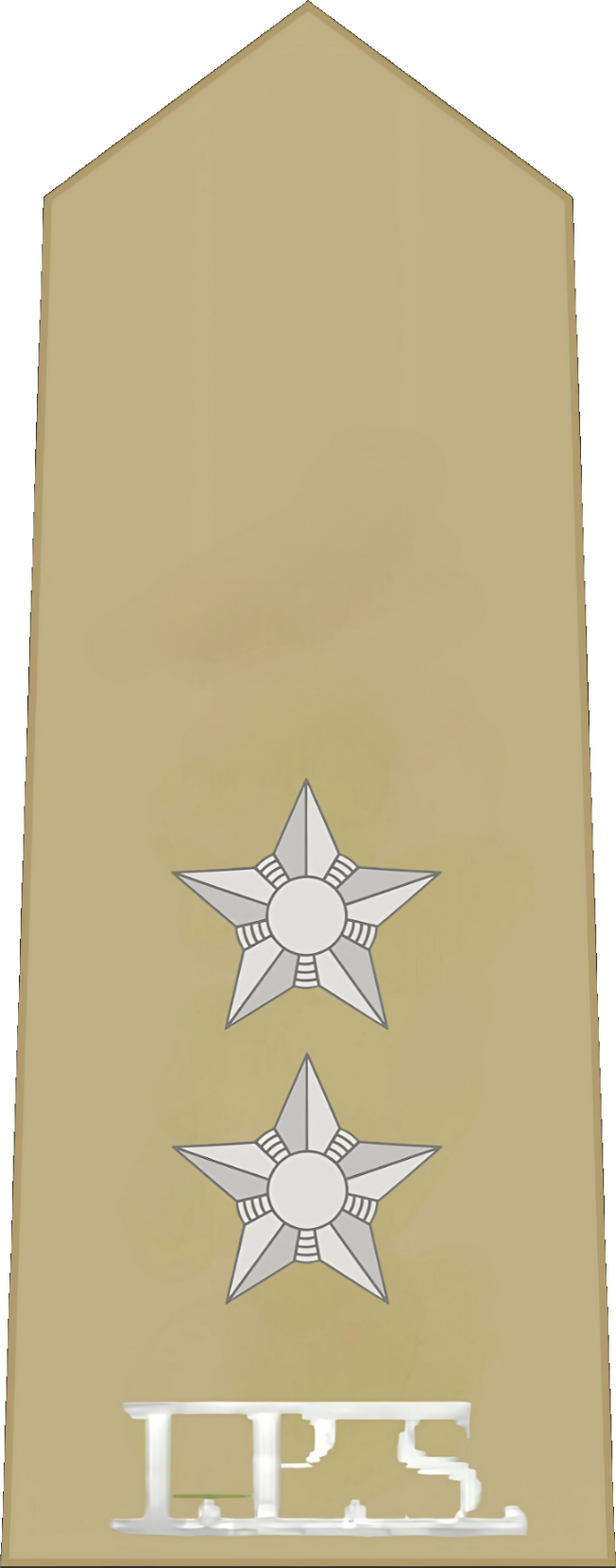
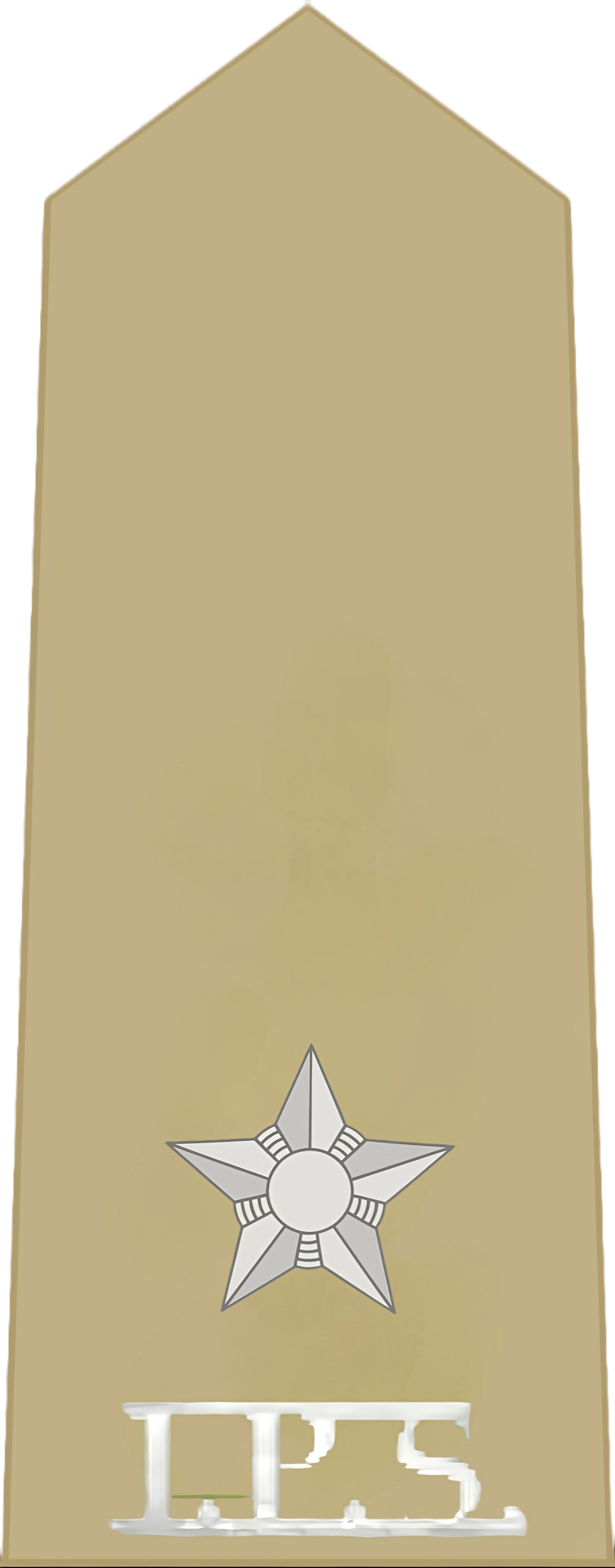
Rank
Director General of Police
Additional Director General of Police (Note: Rank insignia of DGP is similar to Additional DGP.)
Inspector General of Police
Deputy Inspector General of Police
Superintendent of Police (Selection Grade) (Note: The Senior Superintendent of Police (SSP) is a post, not a rank, typically held by an SP (selection grade or junior grade) in states like Uttar Pradesh, Jammu and Kashmir, and Punjab.)
Superintendent of Police
Additional superintendent of police
Assistant Superintendent of Police
Assistant superintendent of police (Probationary for two years)
Assistant Superintendent of Police (Probationary for one year)
Abbreviation
DGP
ADGP
IGP
DIGP
SP (SG)
SP
Addl.SP
ASP
ASP
ASP

- Note 1: The rank insignia of DGP, Spl.DGP, Addl.DGP is the same.
- Note 2: The equivalent rank to the ASP (Asst.SP) in State Police Services is the deputy superintendent of police (DSP/DySP).
- Note 3: The commissioner of police is a post typically held by DIG and above rank officers.

Non-gazette officers

Indian Police non-gazetted officers rank insignia
Insignia
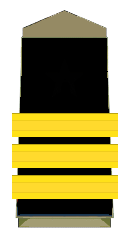
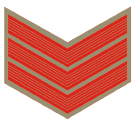
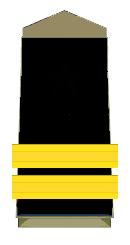
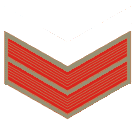
No insignia
Rank
Inspector of Police
Inspector / Circle Inspector (Note: Inspector or Circle Inspector with One Five-Pointed Star insignia exists in West Bengal Police.)
Assistant Police Inspector (Note: This rank exists only in the Maharashtra Police.)
Sub-Inspector
Sergeant (Kolkata Police)
Assistant Sub-Inspector
Head Constable (Note: Shoulder insignia rank only used in the Maharashtra Police.)
Senior Constable (Note: This rank is also known as senior constable, constable grade-I, and exists only in some state police forces.)
Police constable
Abbreviation
INSP
INSP / CO
API
SI
Sgt
ASI
HC
SC
PC

- The rank of Sergeant is used in India only in the Bihar Police and the Kolkata Police
- The One Five Pointed Star for the rank of Inspector is used by Police forces of 7 states viz. West Bengal, Jharkhand, Bihar, Sikkim, Assam, Nagaland and Tripura. This is because Inspectors of Police in these 7 states are Gazetted Officers. However, the Kolkata Police uses the Four Pointed Star of the Order of Bath for the ranks of Inspector and Assistant Commissioner of Police instead of Five Pointed Star. For the ranks of ASI, SI/Sergeant and Deputy Commissioner of Police, the usual Five Pointed Star is used
- Colour pattern and size of chevrons may vary according to the different rules of several distinct Indian State Police services.

=== Police Units ===
Units of Uttar Pradesh Police
| No. | Unit | Current Officer Executive | Rank |
|---|---|---|---|
| 1 | DG Police Intelligence & CBCID | Vijay Kumar | DGP |
| 2 | DG Police HQRS | DR. N. RAVINDER | ADG/GSO |
| 3 | Police HQRS | Bhagirath P. Jogdand | ADG |
| 4 | Anti Corruption Org | Raja Srivastava | ADG |
| 5 | Anti Terrorist Squad (ATS) | NAVEEN ARORA | ADG |
| 5 | Criminal Investigative Department (CID) | Vijay Kumar | DG |
| 5 | Criminal Investigative Department (CID) | K. Satya Narayan | ADG |
| 6 | Economic Offences Wing (EOG) | Prashant Kumar | Special DG |
| 7 | Fire Services | Avinash Chandra | DG |
| 8 | Government Railway Police (GRP) | Jai Narain Singh | ADG |
| 9 | Human Rights | Satish Kumar Mathur | DG |
| 10 | Provincial Armed Constabulary (PAC) | Kalluri SP Kumar | ADG |
| 11 | Recruitment Board (UPPR &PB) | Renuka Mishra | DG |
| 12 | Rules & Manual | Tanuja Srivastava | DG |
| 13 | Security | Binod K. Singh | ADG |
| 14 | Special Enquires | Chandra Prakash | DG |
| 15 | Special Investigation department\ intelligences bureau (SID/IB) | Ashutosh Pandey | ADG |
| 16 | Special Task Force (STF) | Amitabh Yash | ADG |
| 17 | Traffic Directorate | Anupam Kulshrestha | ADG |
| 18 | Training Directorate | Renuka Mishra | DG/Training HQRS |
| 18 | Training Directorate | Anju Gupta | DG/PTS Meerut |
| 18 | Training Directorate | Ajay Anand | ADG/PTS Sultanpur |
| 18 | Training Directorate | Navniet Sekera | ADG/PTS Unnao |
| 18 | Training Directorate | SUNIL KUMAR GUPTA | ADG/Training HQRS |
| 18 | Training Directorate | A. Satish Ganesh | ADG/PTS Moradabad |
| 18 | Training Directorate | Amit Chandra | ADG/PTC Dr BRAP Academy Moradabad |
| 19 | Technical Services | Mohit Agarwal | ADG |
| 20 | Telecom | Sunil Kumar Gupta | ADG |
| 21 | Vigilance | Vijay Kumar | DG |
| 22 | Logistics | Raj Kumar | ADG |
| 23 | (UP 112) ITECCS | Ashok Kumar Singh | ADG |
| 24 | Civil Defence | Mukul Goel | DG |
| 25 | Mahilla Samman Prakoshth | Neera Rawat | ADG |

== List of UP Police Chiefs ==
List of Directors General/ Inspectors General of Uttar Pradesh Police
| No. | Name | From | To |
Directors General of Police (DGP)
| 54 | Rajeev Krishna | 1 June 2025 | Incumbent |
| 53 | Prashant Kumar (IPS) (Acting) | 1 February 2024 | 31 May 2025 |
| 52 | Vijay Kumar (Acting) | 1 June 2023 | 31 January 2024 |
| 51 | Rajkumar Vishvakarma (acting) | 1 April 2023 | 31 May 2023 |
| 50 | Devendra Singh Chauhan (acting) | 12 May 2022 | 31 March 2023 |
| 49 | Mukul Goel | 1 July 2021 | 11 May 2022 |
| 48 | Hitesh Chandra Awasthy | 1 Feb 2020 | 30 June 2021 |
| 47 | Om Prakash Singh | 1 Jan 2018 | 31 Jan 2020 |
| 46 | Sulkhan Singh | 22 Apr 2017 | 31 Dec 2017 |
| 45 | S. Javeed Ahmad | 1 Jan 2016 | 22 Apr 2017 |
| 44 | Jagmohan Yadav | 1 Jul 2015 | 31 Dec 2015 |
| 43 | Arvind Kumar Jain | 31 Jan 2015 | 30 Jun 2015 |
| 42 | Arun Kumar Gupta | 1 Jan 2015 | 31 Jan 2015 |
| 41 | Anand Kumar Banerjee | 28 Feb 2014 | 31 Dec 2014 |
| 40 | Rizwan Ahmed | 1 Jan 2014 | 28 Feb 2014 |
| 39 | Deo Raj Nagar | 12 Apr 2013 | 31 Dec 2013 |
| 38 | A. C. Sharma | 19 Mar 2012 | 12 Apr 2013 |
| 37 | Atul | 8 Jan 2012 | 19 Mar 2012 |
| 36 | Brij Lal | 30 Sep 2011 | 8 Jan 2012 |
| 35 | R. K. Tiwari | 31 Aug 2011 | 30 Sep 2011 |
| 34 | Karamvir Singh | 23 Sep 2009 | 31 Aug 2011 |
| 33 | Vikram Singh | 23 Jun 2007 | 23 Sep 2009 |
| 32 | G. L. Sharma | 15 Mar 2007 | 23 Jun 2007 |
| 31 | Bua Singh | 3 Apr 2006 | 14 Mar 2007 |
| 30 | Yashpal Singh | 11 Jan 2005 | 3 Apr 2006 |
| 29 | V. K. B. Nair | 28 Jun 2003 | 11 Jan 2005 |
| 28 | Hakam Singh | 20 Mar 2003 | 28 Jun 2003 |
| 27 | R. M. Shukla | 20 Jul 2002 | 20 Mar 2003 |
| 26 | R. K. Pandit | 31 Jul 2001 | 20 Jul 2002 |
| 25 | M. C. Dwivedi | 31 Jul 2000 | 31 Jul 2001 |
| 24 | Shri Ram Arun | 23 Dec 1999 | 31 Jul 2000 |
| 23 | K. L. Gupta | 2 Apr 1998 | 23 Dec 1999 |
| 22 | Shri Ram Arun | 3 May 1997 | 2 Apr 1998 |
| 21 | Haridas | 24 Nov 1996 | 3 May 1997 |
| 20 | S. N. P. Sinha | 4 Jul 1996 | 24 Nov 1996 |
| 19 | V. S. Mathur | 31 Mar 1996 | 4 Jul 1996 |
| 18 | Girish Bihari | 12 Aug 1995 | 31 Mar 1996 |
| 17 | V. S. Mathur | 30 Sep 1994 | 12 Aug 1995 |
| 16 | V.P. Kapoor | 8 Jun 1993 | 30 Sep 1994 |
| 15 | Prakash Singh | 23 Dec 1992 | 8 Jun 1993 |
| 14 | S.V.M. Tripathi | 30 Sep 1992 | 23 Dec 1992 |
| 13 | Prakash Singh | 22 Jul 1991 | 30 Sep 1992 |
| 12 | V. K. Jain | 31 Dec 1990 | 22 Jul 1991 |
| 11 | R. P. Mathur | 30 Dec 1989 | 31 Dec 1990 |
| 10 | R. P. Joshi | 31 Jul 1989 | 30 Dec 1989 |
| 9 | Harimohan | 31 Dec 1988 | 31 Jul 1989 |
| 8 | R. N. Gupta | 8 Jun 1987 | 31 Dec 1988 |
| 7 | D. S. Bhatnagar | 31 Mar 1987 | 8 Jun 1987 |
| 6 | P. C. Kakkar | 1 Jan 1987 | 31 Mar 1987 |
| 5 | D. K. Agarwal | 17 Sep 1985 | 31 Dec 1986 |
| 4 | J. N. Chaturvedi | 1 Apr 1984 | 17 Sep 1985 |
| 3 | Shrish Chandra Dikshit | 25 Jul 1982 | 31 Mar 1984 |
| 2 | Naresh Kumar | 5 Mar 1982 | 24 Jul 1982 |
| 1 | Mahendra Singh | 24 Feb 1981 | 4 March 1982 |
Inspector Generals of Police
| 14 | Naresh Kumar | 24 Feb 1981 | 4 Mar 1982 |
| 13 | Mahendra Singh | 12 Mar 1980 | 23 Feb 1981 |
| 12 | Lal Singh Verma | 5 Jul 1977 | 11 Mar 1980 |
| 11 | Sarvan Tandon | 27 Mar 1976 | 4 Jul 1977 |
| 10 | Govind Chandra | 16 May 1975 | 26 Mar 1976 |
| 09 | H. K. Kherr | 1 Dec 1973 | 15 May 1975 |
| 08 | A. K. Dass | 5 Nov 1971 | 30 Nov 1973 |
| 07 | Islam Ahmad | 18 May 1971 | 4 Nov 1971 |
| 06 | N. S. Saxena | 20 Feb 1970 | 17 May 1971 |
| 05 | Jiyaram | 10 Apr 1967 | 19 Feb 1970 |
| 04 | Shanti Prasad | 17 Feb 1961 | 9 Apr 1967 |
| 03 | M. S. Mathur | 1 Apr 1954 | 16 Feb 1961 |
| 02 | T. P. Bhalla | 13 Jan 1953 | 31 Mar 1954 |
| 01 | B. N. Lahari | 27 Oct 1947 | 12 Jan 1953 |

List of Inspector Generals of United Provinces Police
| No. | Name | From | To |
|---|---|---|---|
| 11 | SG Pearce | 1 December 1946 | 26 October 1947 |
| 10 | P Meabsure | 28 June 1945 | 30 November 1946 |
| 10 | MA Inglis | 6 July 1940 | 26 June 1945 |
| 9 | RA Horton | 7 November 1937 | 5 July 1940 |
| 8 | AH Phillips | 15 March 1937 | 6 November 1937 |
| 7 | RA Horton | 16 June 1935 | 18 February 1937 |
| 5 | ST Holling | 7 April 1934 | 15 June 1935 |
| 6 | HR Roe | 5 November 1933 | 6 April 1934 |
| 5 | ST Holling | 27 April 1931 | 4 November 1933 |
| | RJS Dodd | 5 November 1928 | 25 March 1931 |
| 4 | AH Williamson | 3 May 1928 | 4 November 1928 |
| 3 | RJS Dodd | 7 November 1925 | 2 May 1928 |
| 2 | AD Ashdown | 1 October 1923 | 6 November 1925 |
| 1 | LM Kaye | 23 February 1919 | 30 September 1923 |

== Technology ==
=== Facial recognition system ===
UP police uses a database of 500,000+ criminals with facial recognition technology in its "Trinetra" face identification system.

=== Social media research center ===
A social media command and research center has been established in Meerut. The center monitors trends in social media that can have an impact on law & order situation and advise concerned district and range police chiefs.

== Firearms ==
Most of the weapons in service with the Uttar Pradesh Police are locally produced by the Indian ordnance factories controlled by the Ordnance Factories Board, the police also induct various weapons imported by the Ministry of Home Affairs as part of modernization plans.

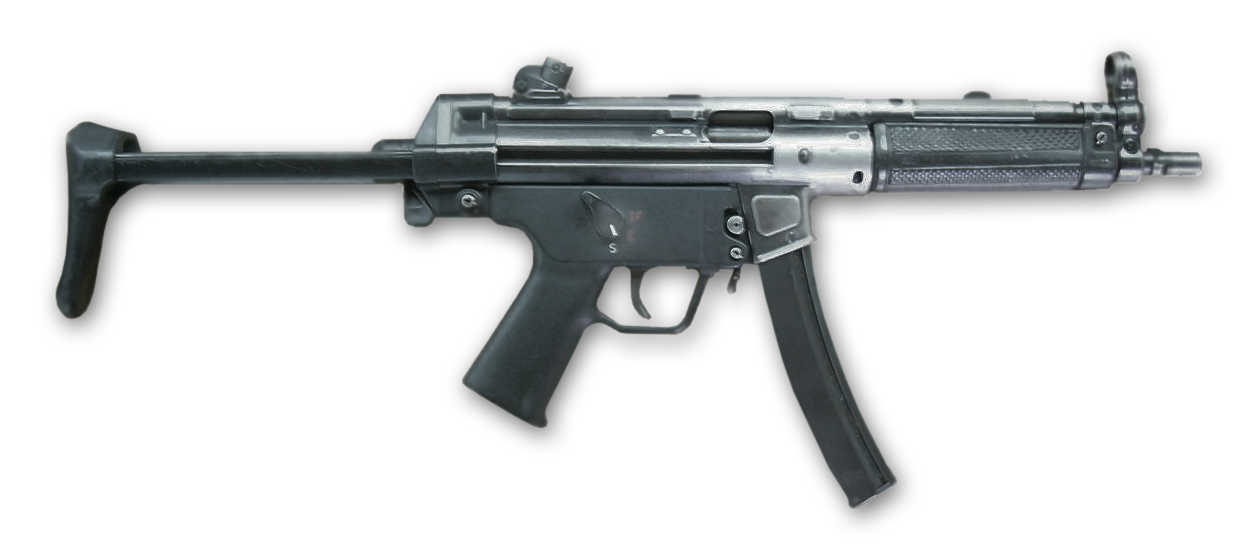
HK MP5 noBG

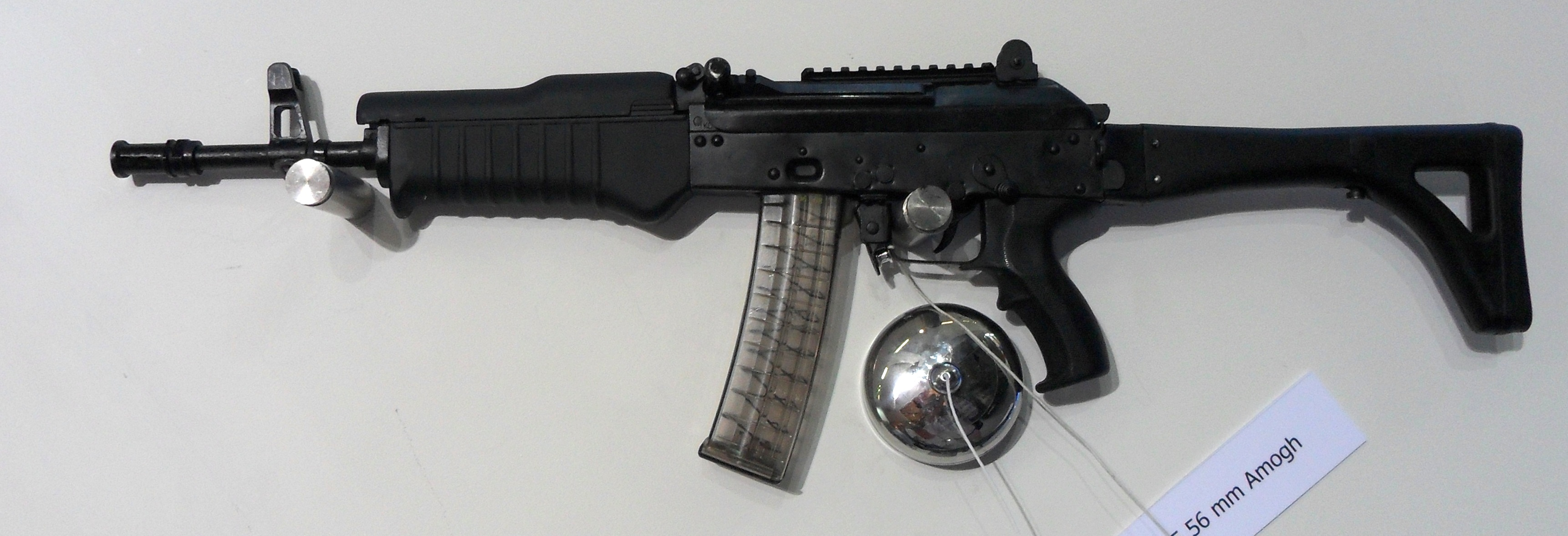
AMOGH – Carbine.

As per the 2017 audit by the Comptroller and Auditor General of India, Uttar Pradesh Police has a shortage of 45,047 handguns and an excess of 56,298 rifles.

48%, 58,853, of the 1.22 lakh (122,000) rifles available to the state police are of point-303 bore category, which was rendered obsolete by the Ministry of Home Affairs in 1995.

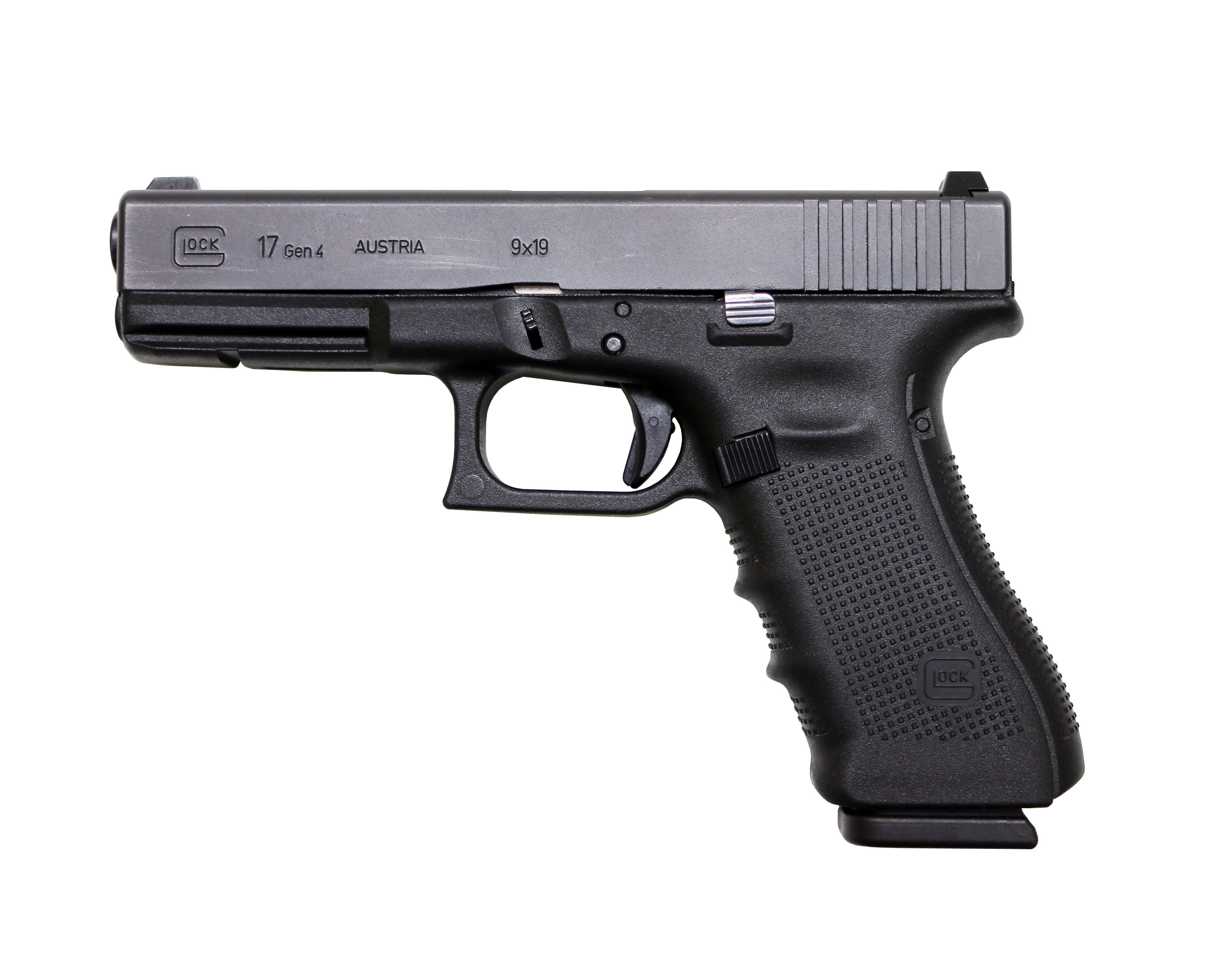
GLOCK 17 Gen 4 Pistol MOD 45160305

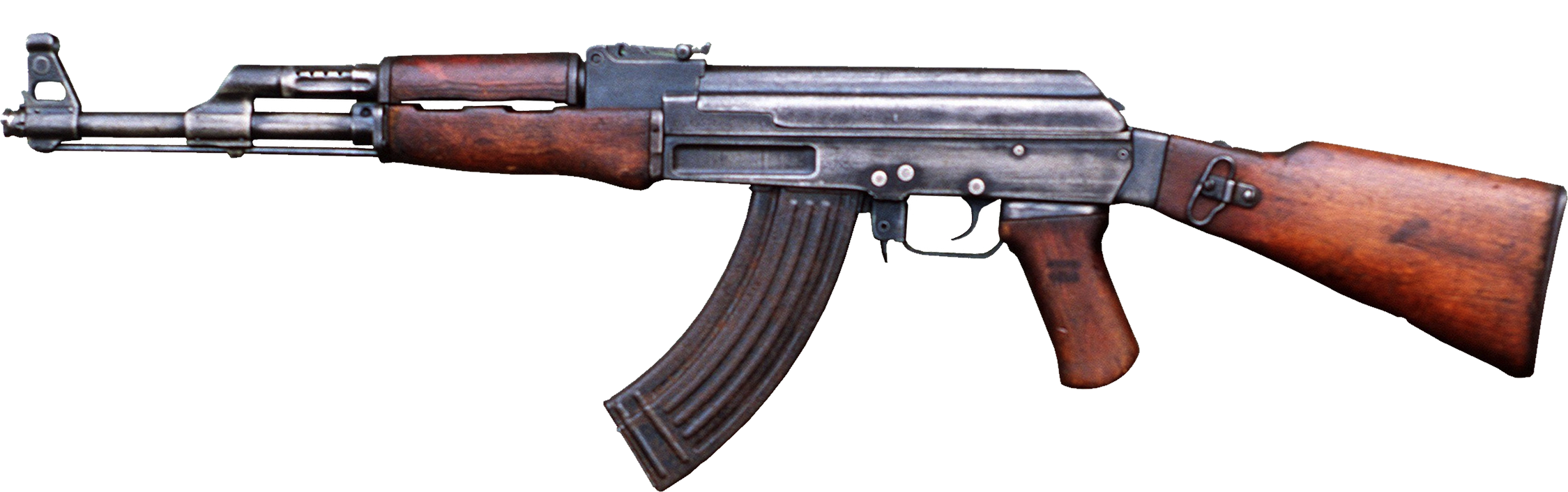
AK-47

Aside from the standard issue wooden baton, weapons of the UP Police also include:

| Name | Country of origin | Type |
|---|---|---|
| IOF .32 | India | Revolver |
| Pistol Auto 9mm 1A | India | Semi-automatic pistol |
| Glock 17 | Austria | Semi-automatic pistol |
| Beretta PX4 Storm | Italy | Semi-automatic pistol |
| Sten | United Kingdom | Submachine gun |
| 9mm SAF Carbine 1A1 | India | Submachine gun |
| Heckler & Koch MP5 | Germany | Submachine gun |
| Brügger & Thomet MP9 | Switzerland | Submachine gun |
| Lee–Enfield Mk III | United Kingdom | Rifle |
| INSAS rifle | India | Rifle |
| L1A1 SLR | India | Rifle |
| Amogh carbine | India | Rifle |
| Ishapore 2A1 | India | Rifle |
| AK-47 | Soviet Union | Rifle |
| AKM | Soviet Union | Rifle |
| OFB LMG | India | Squad Automatic Weapon |

== Controversies and criticism of misconduct ==
The Uttar Pradesh Police has an extensive history of police brutality, misconduct, and corruption, as well as discrimination on the basis of caste and religion. As of 2026, the Uttar Pradesh Police follows the colonial Police Act of 1861, which has led to these controversial implications.

=== Corruption ===
In 2007, 18,000 police officers were fired as they were hired despite being unqualified for the job. These new recruits were illiterates who bribed between ₹100,000 and ₹500,000 to cheat in the UP police entrance tests.

In 2020, Uttar Pradesh government started an operation to screen allegedly corrupt police officials who will be forced to take retirement.

=== Fake encounters and Brutality ===
In 2018, India Today carried out an investigative piece reporting incidents of UP police framing innocent people and killing them in staged encounters for money and promotions. A sub-inspector had allegedly offered to gun down an innocent civilian for around Rs 8 lakh. Between 2015–2018, 211 complaints of fake encounters were filed in India out of which 39 were on UP police. In 2012, 17 UP police personnel were given life term for killing an incontinent 24-year-old man in a 1992 fake encounter and later they branded the victim as a terrorist.

The Provincial Armed Constabulary of Uttar Pradesh Police was involved in the controversial Hashimpura massacre of 1987, in the aftermath of the riots in Meerut. In October 2018, 16 officials of the PAC found guilty for their involvement in the massacre were sentenced to life imprisonment by the Delhi High Court.

On 10 July 2020, Uttar Pradesh police personnel were involved in the encounter of gangster and former BSP leader Vikas Dubey. Dubey was apprehended a day before near the Mahakaleshwar Jyotirlinga temple in Ujjain, Madhya Pradesh. The police vehicle taking him back to Uttar Pradesh was involved in a crash; seeing the opportunity, Dubey allegedly snatched a pistol from a policeman trying to fix a flat tire and tried to run away, before being killed by the Uttar Pradesh police. An earlier attempt to arrest Dubey resulted in the death of eight policemen, including a DSP rank officer. Through an investigation, call records showed that Dubey was in contact with multiple police personnel, who were acting as moles and leaked information to him.

=== Moral Policing ===
The Uttar Pradesh Police has been extensively involved in incidents of moral policing. These incidents have earned ire from general public and media personnel, besides the Supreme Court.

On 19 December 2005, police personnel raided a public park in Meerut, accompanied by cameras crews from TV channels. They attacked couples sitting in the park in front of cameras. The raid was termed "Operation Majnu" (named after the folklore) and it was claimed by the police that the purpose was to check sexual harassment.

On 29 November 2011, the Ghaziabad police launched its own "Operation Majnu". The police caught couples in parks and made the men do sit-ups in front of TV cameras. The head of the operation an officer called Alka Pandey said it was to prevent "innocent girls being trapped by boys with evil motives".

On 10 August 2013, Ghaziabad police raided a hotel on a tip-off and detained 56 adult couples. It was later found out of them, 52 couples were married or consenting friends. The police had carried out the raid after locals noticed usual traffic to the hotel and told the police.

In 2017, Chief Minister Yogi Adityanath started the anti-romeo squads in the department for safety of women and young girls from sexual harassment and eve-teasing. However, the squads were found to be involved in acts of moral policing, harassment of couples, as well as extortion. Due to such incidents, the Police force and the Government came under fire from media for such incidents of moral policing, as well as misuse of authority, eventually demanding that the squads be disbanded.

In December 2025, a Station House Officer in Mau, Uttar Pradesh, was transferred, after she was found questioning a school girl and her brother, warning them not to be roaming around without guardians after suspecting a relationship between the siblings, which sparked widespread condemnation of moral policing. As a result of this, the Mau Superintendent of Police stated to the media about sensitising and counselling all police personnel regarding their behavior with the public.

=== Crimes against Women ===
The Uttar Pradesh Police has an infamous history of refusing to file reports and investigate crimes against women, notably rape cases, especially when high profile individuals like political leaders are involved, or caste bias. This has led to botched investigations, or cases being assigned to the CBI. Despite the changes mandated by Criminal Law (Amendment) Act, 2013, the attitude of Uttar Pradesh Police officials has often been lackluster, which has worsened crime rate and safety of women, especially in the rural areas and with most victims belonging to minority and backward castes. There have also been police officers accused of crimes against women, especially rape, molestation, and sexual harassment. In several cases, lower ranked police personnel have faced suspension and dismissal for inaction, ignorance, and insensitivity by indulging in victim blaming instead of investigating the crimes and apprehending the culprits.

In February 2017, the Uttar Pradesh Police refused to file a rape case against Gayatri Prasad Prajapati, then minister of State for mining. Following the refusal, the victim approached Supreme Court, which passed an order to the department to have the report filed and conduct an investigation. Gayatri Prasad Prajapati was arrested in March 2017 after absconding for long. On 12 November 2021, he was sentenced to life on the charges of rape.

The Uttar Pradesh Police was criticized for mishandling the 2017 Unnao rape case, which involved expelled BJP MLA Kuldeep Singh Sengar. The victim's father went to file report earlier, but after initial refusal by the department, the Supreme Court took action and ordered filing the report. However, in the aftermath, 6 officers were suspended for arresting the victim's father and subsequent custodial death, who was also assaulted by the accused's brother Atul Sengar. Following outrage and protests, the CBI took over the investigation and the case was handed to Allahabad High Court. Kuldeep Sengar was convicted in December 2019 and sentenced to life imprisonment for rape and kidnapping, along with a fine of Rs 25 lakhs.

In the 2020 Hathras gang rape and murder, the Uttar Pradesh Police came under fire, after some officials forcibly cremated the body of the victim girl without the consent of her family. DK Verma, the station house officer of Chandpa Police Station, was transferred for his "failure to promptly act" in the case, as well as humiliating the victim, refusal to file a report, and failure to follow procedures laid down for investigation of rape. A CBI team, appointed by the State Government in the aftermath, heavily condemned the Uttar Pradesh Police for cover-up through inaction and delay in collecting samples as well as other evidence, eventually botching up the investigation, along with misconduct against the victim's family and failure to provide timely medical aid to the victim. The botched investigation led to the acquittal of 3 of the 4 accused, as with lack of crucial evidence, neither of them charged with rape and murder; furthermore, the department was also condemned for failure to stop protests led by expelled BJP MLA Rajveer Singh Pehelwan, with activists and members of Vishwa Hindu Parishad and Bajrang Dal, who held a rally in support for the accused as they belonged to the upper castes. Additionally, the Provincial Armed Constabulary, tasked to protect the victim's family, was slammed for allowing kin of accused and the upper caste villagers to enter the premises of the victim's family and threaten them to take back their case; following media allegations, the CRPF took over the security of the family. Following the trial in March 2023 at the Hathras district court, which led to acquittal of 3 suspects of 4 with the last one only charged for culpable homicide not amounting to murder (IPC Section 304) and provisions under the SC/ST Act, the prosecution and defense appealed the trial in the Allahabad High Court.

On 20 September 2023, eight police personnel across the state were arrested and charged for different crimes against women.

=== Political Influence and Interference ===
From 30 October 1990 to 2 November 1990, on the orders of Samajwadi Party leader Mulayam Singh Yadav, the Uttar Pradesh Police attacked Kar Sevaks in Ayodhya, killing 17 devotees. The action was heavily condemned, and Yadav suffered a heavy defeat in the 1991 elections as a result, and was labeled "Mulla" Mulayam Singh by opposition leaders, especially the Bharatiya Janata Party.

On 18 March 2015, the Uttar Pradesh police arrested a minor teenager from Bareilly, Uttar Pradesh, for making a post on Facebook insulting politician Azam Khan. The post allegedly contained hate speech against a community and was falsely attributed to Azam Khan by the boy. He was charged under Section 66A of the IT Act, and Sections 153A (promoting enmity between different religions), 504 (intentional insult with intent to provoke breach of peace) and 505 (public mischief) of the Indian Penal Code. After Section 66A was struck down by the Supreme Court on 24 March 2015, the state government said that they would continue the prosecution under the remaining charges.

On 10 July 2015, IPS Officer Amitabh Thakur, who was posted as an IG, alleged that former Chief Minister and Samajwadi Party leader Mulayam Singh Yadav, had threatened him on a phone call. He released the audio of the phone call, in which Yadav is allegedly heard saying certain sentences of threatening nature: Thakur alleged that Mulayam Singh was unhappy about the complaint lodged by his wife Nutan against the state minister Gayatri Prasad Prajapati for illegal mining activities. In retaliation, Thakur was charged with false cases of rape and disproportionate assets, both of which were proven to be baseless and he was cleared by the Economic Offenses Wing and the Vigilance Department.

=== Supporting Right Wing Organizations ===
The Uttar Pradesh Police has received widespread condemnation for filing charges against victims of cow vigilantism. The victims, who have been accused of cow slaughter or smuggling of cattle, belong to either Muslim or lower caste Hindu communities.

Following the introduction of Prohibition of Unlawful Religious Conversion Ordinance, 2020 in Uttar Pradesh to curb Love Jihad, the Uttar Pradesh Police, collaborating with Bajrang Dal, have attempted to stop interfaith marriages. In certain cases, misconduct of Uttar Pradesh Police officials have resulted in backlash, especially against women thought to be victims of Love Jihad. The police personnel have also targeted couples involved in inter-caste marriages, while apparently using this law against Muslim and Dalit community, along with stopping consensual inter-faith marriages.

In 2014, a girl, whose father was a liquor baron in Agra, eloped with a man and sought shelter with the Love Commandos in nearby New Delhi. The girl's father used his influence to ask the Uttar Pradesh police in Agra to search for the girl. Agra police allegedly managed to find the girl's location in a suburban area in New Delhi by using her cellphone signal. They began combing area while being armed. Ultimately, the Delhi Police had to intervene and stop the illegal search.

== In popular culture ==
These law enforcement officers have been depicted in Indian cinema through various films. The Dabangg series of films starring Salman Khan are an example of depiction of the UP Police. Bhaukaal (web series) is based on Senior IPS Officer Navniet Sekera of U.P. Police.

- Article 15 (film)

== See also ==
- State Disaster Response Force Uttar Pradesh Police
- National Police Memorial India
- Corps of Military Police (India)
- Emergency telephone number
- UP Provincial Armed Constabulary
- 1973 Provincial Armed Constabulary revolt
- Lucknow Police
- Varanasi Police Commissionerate
