= Department of Home and Confidential =

Government department in Uttar Pradesh, India

- Gṛha Evaṃ Gopana Vibhāga

Department overview
- Jurisdiction: State of Uttar Pradesh
- Headquarters: Department of Home, Lal Bahadur Shastri Bhawan (Annexe Building), Sarojini Naidu Marg, Lucknow, Uttar Pradesh; 26.8404943°N 80.94444599999997°E
- Annual budget: ₹18,515 crore (US$1.9 billion) (2017-18 est.)
- Minister responsible: Yogi Adityanath, Chief Minister of Uttar Pradesh and Minister of Home and Confidential
- Department executives: Sanjay Prasad, IAS, Additional Chief Secretary A.C.S. (Home&Confidential) Chief Minister's Office & Passport); Bhagwan S. Srivastava, IPS, Secretary; Om Prakash Verma, IAS, Secretary
- Child agencies: UP Civil Police; UP PAC; UP CB-CID; UP ATS; UP STF; UP SSF; UP SBF; UP SIT; UP ACO; UP SDRF; UP Emergency & Fire Services (E&FS); UP ANTF; UP EOW; UP SIB
- Website: Official website

The Department of Home and Confidential (IAST: Gṛha Evaṃ Gopana Vibhāga) or Home Department serves as the ministry of the interior of the Government of Uttar Pradesh. Responsible for the maintenance of law and order in the state of Uttar Pradesh, the department makes decisions regarding the peace of the state and enforcement of law and order and is responsible for the functioning of the state police. The department also prepares the state police's budget and—subject to the legislature's approval—releases funds. The department acts the cadre controlling authority of the Uttar Pradesh cadre of Indian Police Service (IPS) and Provincial Police Service (PPS). The chief minister serves as the departmental minister for the department, whereas the Additional Chief Secretary (Home)—an Indian Administrative Service (IAS) officer—acts as the administrative head of the department.

== Functions ==
The Department of Home and Confidential is mainly responsible for making decisions regarding the peace of the state and enforcement of law and policy related to the functioning of the Uttar Pradesh Police, by preparing its budget and—subject to approval from the Uttar Pradesh Legislative Assembly—releasing funds to it. The department answers questions related to law and order in the legislative assembly and the legislative council; addresses the issues related to the affairs of the Uttar Pradesh Human Rights Commission and the National Human Rights Commission. The department also coordinates with the Ministry of Home Affairs in matters related police and law and order.

The department ensures the security arrangements of citizens, very important persons, very very important persons and state guests. The Uttar Pradesh Police Housing Corporation—an autonomous body—is set up under the department to fulfil the housing and building requirements of the Uttar Pradesh Police. The department also acts the cadre controlling authority of the Indian Police Service and the Provincial Police Service.

== Important officials ==
=== Headquarters ===
The Chief Minister of Uttar Pradesh, Yogi Adityanath, is the minister responsible for the Department of Home and Confidential.

The department's administration is headed by a Principal Secretary Home, an IAS officer, who is assisted by four secretaries, one of whom is an inspector general-rank Indian Police Service, ten special secretaries, and twelve deputy/under secretaries.

Senior officials
Name	Designation
Sanjay Prasad	Additional Chief Secretary (A.C.S.) Home & Confidential, Chief Minister's Office & Passport Office Affairs
Bhagwan S.Srivastava	Secretary/Inspector General
Om Prakash Verma	Secretary
Rakesh Kumar Malpani	Special Secretary
Vivek	Special Secretary
Anurag Patel	Special Secretary
Amitabh Tripathi	Special Secretary
Shyam Lal Yadav	Special Secretary
Amar Sen Singh	Special Secretary

=== Head of department level ===
At the head of department level, apart from Director General of Police, Director of Prosecution, Director General (CB-CID), Director General (Fire Service), Director General (Technical Services), Director General (Training Services) and Director General (Prisons) are appointed. The department also has an attached office in Uttar Pradesh Police Housing Corporation, which acts an autonomous organisation and was set up to accomplish the housing and building requirements of Uttar Pradesh Police.

Heads of Departments and Attached Offices
Name	Position
Vijay Kumar Vishwakarma	Director General, Uttar Pradesh Police
Anand Kumar	Director General (Prisons)
Vijaya Kumar	Director General (CB-CID)
Vacant	Director General (Fire Service)
Lalit Mudgal	Director of Prosecution (elevated from State prosecution services)
Mukul Goel	Director General (civil defence)
Renuka Mishra	Director General (U.P Police Promotion and Recruitment Board)
Anju Gupta	DG (Training)
Amitabh Yash	DG (UP STF)
