= Madhurmau Khurd =

Village in Uttar Pradesh, India

- Village
- Location in Uttar Pradesh, India Madhurmau Khurd (India)
- Coordinates: 26.78297°N 81.04197°E
- Country: India
- State: Uttar Pradesh
- District: Lucknow

Area
  - Total: 0.819 km^{2} (0.316 sq mi)
- Elevation: 116 m (381 ft)

Population (2011)
  - Total: 2,012
  - Density: 2,460/km^{2} (6,360/sq mi)

Languages
  - Official: Hindi
- Time zone: UTC+5:30 (IST)

Madhurmau Khurd, sometimes written as Marhar Mau Khurd, is a village in Gosainganj block of Lucknow district, Uttar Pradesh, India. As of 2011, its population is 2,012, in 372 households.

== See also ==
- Madhurmau Kalan
