= Rahmatnagar =

Village in Uttar Pradesh, India

- Village
- Location in Uttar Pradesh, India Rahmatnagar (India)
- Coordinates: 26.7437°N 81.16577°E
- Country: India
- State: Uttar Pradesh
- District: Lucknow

Area
  - Total: 2.759 km^{2} (1.065 sq mi)
- Elevation: 116 m (381 ft)

Population (2011)
  - Total: 3,618
  - Density: 1,311/km^{2} (3,396/sq mi)

Languages
  - Official: Hindi
- Time zone: UTC+5:30 (IST)

Rahmatnagar is a village in Gosainganj block of Lucknow district, Uttar Pradesh, India. As of 2011, its population is 3,618, in 687 households. It is the seat of a gram panchayat, which also includes the villages of Seephatanagar and Lakhpera.
