= Chamartaliya =

Village in Uttar Pradesh, India

Chamartaliya Chamartalia
- Village
- Location in Uttar Pradesh, India Chamartaliya (India)
- Coordinates: 26.7629°N 81.16992°E
- Country: India
- State: Uttar Pradesh
- District: Lucknow

Area
  - Total: 0.929 km^{2} (0.359 sq mi)
- Elevation: 120 m (390 ft)

Population (2011)
  - Total: 832
  - Density: 896/km^{2} (2,320/sq mi)

Languages
  - Official: Hindi
- Time zone: UTC+5:30 (IST)

Chamartaliya, also spelled Chamartalia, is a village in Gosainganj block of Lucknow district, Uttar Pradesh, India. As of 2011, its population is 832, in 155 households.
