= Shahzadipur =

Village in Uttar Pradesh, India

Shahzadipur Shāhzādipur
- Village
- Location in Uttar Pradesh, India Shahzadipur (India)
- Coordinates: 26.70457°N 81.15751°E
- Country: India
- State: Uttar Pradesh
- District: Lucknow

Area
  - Total: 2.73 km^{2} (1.05 sq mi)
- Elevation: 119 m (390 ft)

Population (2011)
  - Total: 847
  - Density: 310/km^{2} (804/sq mi)

Languages
  - Official: Hindi
- Time zone: UTC+5:30 (IST)

Shahzadipur, also spelled Sahzadepur, is a village in Gosainganj block of Lucknow district, Uttar Pradesh, India. As of 2011, its population is 847, in 161 households. It is part of the gram panchayat of Rasulpur Ashik Ali.

== See also ==
- Sengta
