= Habuapur =

Village in Uttar Pradesh, India

- Village
- Location in Uttar Pradesh, India Habuapur (India)
- Coordinates: 26.73953°N 81.06599°E
- Country: India
- State: Uttar Pradesh
- District: Lucknow

Population (2011)
  - Total: 1,041

Languages
  - Official: Hindi
- Time zone: UTC+5:30 (IST)
- PIN: 226501

Habuapur is a village in Gosainganj block of Lucknow district, Uttar Pradesh, India. In 2011, its population was 1041 in 249 households. It is administrated by gram panchayat.
