= Madhurmau Kalan =

Village in Uttar Pradesh, India

Madhurmau Kalan Madhurmau Kalān
- Village
- Location in Uttar Pradesh, India Madhurmau Kalan (India)
- Coordinates: 26.77765°N 81.03667°E
- Country: India
- State: Uttar Pradesh
- District: Lucknow

Area
  - Total: 1.666 km^{2} (0.643 sq mi)
- Elevation: 119 m (390 ft)

Population (2011)
  - Total: 2,047
  - Density: 1,229/km^{2} (3,182/sq mi)

Languages
  - Official: Hindi
- Time zone: UTC+5:30 (IST)

Madhurmau Kalan, sometimes written as Marhar Mau Kala, is a village in Gosainganj block of Lucknow district, Uttar Pradesh, India. As of 2011, its population is 2,047, in 377 households.

== See also ==
- Madhurmau Khurd
