= Sikandarpur Amoliya =

Village in Uttar Pradesh, India

- Village
- Location in Uttar Pradesh, India Sikandarpur Amoliya (India)
- Coordinates: 26.75595°N 81.03911°E
- Country: India
- State: Uttar Pradesh
- District: Lucknow

Population (2011)
  - Total: 1,655

Languages
  - Official: Hindi
- Time zone: UTC+5:30 (IST)

Sikandarpur Amoliya is a village in Gosainganj block of Lucknow district, Uttar Pradesh, India. In 2011, its population was 1655 in 322 households. It is administrated by gram panchayat.
