= Rakibabad =

Village in Uttar Pradesh, India

Rakibabad Rakibābād
- Village
- Location in Uttar Pradesh, India Rakibabad (India)
- Coordinates: 26.7465°N 81.03761°E
- Country: India
- State: Uttar Pradesh
- District: Lucknow

Area
  - Total: 1.113 km^{2} (0.430 sq mi)
- Elevation: 122 m (400 ft)

Population (2011)
  - Total: 1,204
  - Density: 1,082/km^{2} (2,802/sq mi)

Languages
  - Official: Hindi
- Time zone: UTC+5:30 (IST)

Rakibabad, sometimes written as Rakeebabad, is a village in Gosainganj block of Lucknow district, Uttar Pradesh, India. As of 2011, its population is 1,204, in 254 households. It is part of the gram panchayat of Sikandarpur Amauliya.
