= Basrahia =

Village in Uttar Pradesh, India

- Village
- Location in Uttar Pradesh, India Basrahia (India)
- Coordinates: 26.74811°N 81.13569°E
- Country: India
- State: Uttar Pradesh
- District: Lucknow

Area
  - Total: 2.061 km^{2} (0.796 sq mi)
- Elevation: 117 m (384 ft)

Population (2011)
  - Total: 1,596
  - Density: 774.4/km^{2} (2,006/sq mi)

Languages
  - Official: Hindi
- Time zone: UTC+5:30 (IST)

Basrahia, also spelled Basrheya, is a village in Gosainganj block of Lucknow district, Uttar Pradesh, India. As of 2011, its population is 1,596, in 301 households.
