= Sathwara, Lucknow =

Village in Uttar Pradesh, India

Sathwara
- Village
- Location in Uttar Pradesh, India Sathwara (India)
- Coordinates: 26.762455°N 81.069697°E
- Country: India
- State: Uttar Pradesh
- District: Lucknow

Area
  - Total: 2.14 km^{2} (0.83 sq mi)

Population (2011)
  - Total: 2,069
  - Density: 967/km^{2} (2,500/sq mi)

Languages
  - Official: Hindi
- Time zone: UTC+5:30 (IST)

Sathwara is a village in Gosainganj block of Lucknow district, Uttar Pradesh, India. As of 2011, its population is 2,069, in 393 households. It is the seat of a gram panchayat.
