= Ghuskar =

Village in Uttar Pradesh, India

- Village
- Location in Uttar Pradesh, India Ghuskar (India)
- Coordinates: 26.76753°N 81.18359°E
- Country: India
- State: Uttar Pradesh
- District: Lucknow

Area
  - Total: 7.291 km^{2} (2.815 sq mi)
- Elevation: 115 m (377 ft)

Population (2011)
  - Total: 3,482
  - Density: 477.6/km^{2} (1,237/sq mi)

Languages
  - Official: Hindi
- Time zone: UTC+5:30 (IST)

Ghuskar is a village in Gosainganj block of Lucknow district, Uttar Pradesh, India. As of 2011, its population is 3,482, in 605 households. It is the seat of a gram panchayat.
