= Mohari Kalan =

Village in Uttar Pradesh, India

Mohari Kalan Mohāri Kalān
- Village
- Location in Uttar Pradesh, India Mohari Kalan (India)
- Coordinates: 26.72404°N 81.05071°E
- Country: India
- State: Uttar Pradesh
- District: Lucknow

Area
  - Total: 3.395 km^{2} (1.311 sq mi)
- Elevation: 123 m (404 ft)

Population (2011)
  - Total: 1,801
  - Density: 530.5/km^{2} (1,374/sq mi)

Languages
  - Official: Hindi
- Time zone: UTC+5:30 (IST)

Mohari Kalan is a village in Gosainganj block of Lucknow district, Uttar Pradesh, India. As of 2011, its population is 1,801, in 350 households. It is the seat of a gram panchayat.

== See also ==
- Mohari Khurd
