= Shiular =

Village in Uttar Pradesh, India

- Village
- Location in Uttar Pradesh, India Shiular (India)
- Coordinates: 26.75347°N 81.09725°E
- Country: India
- State: Uttar Pradesh
- District: Lucknow

Area
  - Total: 4.31 km^{2} (1.66 sq mi)
- Elevation: 121 m (397 ft)

Population (2011)
  - Total: 4,042
  - Density: 938/km^{2} (2,430/sq mi)

Languages
  - Official: Hindi
- Time zone: UTC+5:30 (IST)

Shiular, also spelled Siwlar, is a village in Gosainganj block of Lucknow district, Uttar Pradesh, India. As of 2011, its population is 4,042, in 726 households. It is the seat of a gram panchayat.
