= Malauli =

Village in Uttar Pradesh, India

- Village
- Location in Uttar Pradesh, India Malauli (India)
- Coordinates: 26.78824°N 81.1107°E
- Country: India
- State: Uttar Pradesh
- District: Lucknow

Area
  - Total: 3.518 km^{2} (1.358 sq mi)
- Elevation: 119 m (390 ft)

Population (2011)
  - Total: 3,053
  - Density: 867.8/km^{2} (2,248/sq mi)

Languages
  - Official: Hindi
- Time zone: UTC+5:30 (IST)

Malauli is a village in Gosainganj block of Lucknow district, Uttar Pradesh, India. As of 2011, its population is 3,053, in 602 households. It is the seat of a gram panchayat.
