= Harduia =

Village in Uttar Pradesh, India

Harduia Hardoeya
- Village
- Location in Uttar Pradesh, India Harduia (India)
- Coordinates: 26.66433°N 81.15489°E
- Country: India
- State: Uttar Pradesh
- District: Lucknow

Area
  - Total: 3.583 km^{2} (1.383 sq mi)
- Elevation: 121 m (397 ft)

Population (2011)
  - Total: 2,560
  - Density: 714/km^{2} (1,850/sq mi)

Languages
  - Official: Hindi
- Time zone: UTC+5:30 (IST)

Harduia, also spelled Hardoeya, is a village in Gosainganj block of Lucknow district, Uttar Pradesh, India. As of 2011, its population is 2,560, in 481 households. It is the seat of a gram panchayat.
