= Mohari Khurd =

Village in Uttar Pradesh, India

Mohari Khurd Mohāri Khurd
- Village
- Location in Uttar Pradesh, India Mohari Khurd (India)
- Coordinates: 26.72788°N 81.04406°E
- Country: India
- State: Uttar Pradesh
- District: Lucknow

Area
  - Total: 2.63 km^{2} (1.02 sq mi)
- Elevation: 127 m (417 ft)

Population (2011)
  - Total: 1,812
  - Density: 689/km^{2} (1,780/sq mi)

Languages
  - Official: Hindi
- Time zone: UTC+5:30 (IST)

Mohari Khurd is a village in Gosainganj block of Lucknow district, Uttar Pradesh, India. As of 2011, its population is 1,812, in 376 households. It is the seat of a gram panchayat.

== See also ==
- Mohari Kalan
