= Dehramau =

Village in Uttar Pradesh, India

Dehramau Dehrāmau
- Village
- Location in Uttar Pradesh, India Dehramau (India)
- Coordinates: 26.7296°N 81.09575°E
- Country: India
- State: Uttar Pradesh
- District: Lucknow

Area
  - Total: 1.657 km^{2} (0.640 sq mi)
- Elevation: 122 m (400 ft)

Population (2011)
  - Total: 588
  - Density: 355/km^{2} (919/sq mi)

Languages
  - Official: Hindi
- Time zone: UTC+5:30 (IST)

Dehramau is a village in Gosainganj block of Lucknow district, Uttar Pradesh, India. As of 2011, its population is 588, in 105 households.
