= Muazzamnagar =

Village in Uttar Pradesh, India

- Village
- Location in Uttar Pradesh, India Muazzamnagar (India)
- Coordinates: 26.78002°N 81.06242°E
- Country: India
- State: Uttar Pradesh
- District: Lucknow

Area
  - Total: 0.798 km^{2} (0.308 sq mi)
- Elevation: 120 m (390 ft)

Population (2011)
  - Total: 753
  - Density: 944/km^{2} (2,440/sq mi)

Languages
  - Official: Hindi
- Time zone: UTC+5:30 (IST)

Muazzamnagar is a village in Gosainganj block of Lucknow district, Uttar Pradesh, India. As of 2011, its population is 753, in 139 households. It is part of the gram panchayat of Kabirpur.
