= Kabirpur =

Kabirpur may refer to:

- Kabirpur, Kapurthala, Punjab
- Kabirpur, Gopalganj, Bihar
- Kabirpur, Lucknow
