= Kabirpur, Lucknow =

Kabirpur Kabīrpur
- Village
- Location in Uttar Pradesh, India Kabirpur (India)
- Coordinates: 26.77663°N 81.06671°E
- Country: India
- State: Uttar Pradesh
- District: Lucknow

Area
  - Total: 1.41 km^{2} (0.54 sq mi)
- Elevation: 119 m (390 ft)

Population (2011)
  - Total: 1,566
  - Density: 1,110/km^{2} (2,880/sq mi)

Languages
  - Official: Hindi
- Time zone: UTC+5:30 (IST)

Kabirpur is a village in Gosainganj block of Lucknow district, Uttar Pradesh, India. As of 2011, its population is 1,566, in 319 households. It is the seat of a gram panchayat, which also includes the village of Muazzamnagar.
