= Lolai =

Village in Uttar Pradesh, India

Lolai Laulai
- Village
- Location in Uttar Pradesh, India Lolai (India)
- Coordinates: 26.8482°N 81.06199°E
- Country: India
- State: Uttar Pradesh
- District: Lucknow

Area
  - Total: 3.426 km^{2} (1.323 sq mi)
- Elevation: 119 m (390 ft)

Population (2011)
  - Total: 3,255
  - Density: 950.1/km^{2} (2,461/sq mi)

Languages
  - Official: Hindi
- Time zone: UTC+5:30 (IST)

Lolai, also spelled Laulai, is a village in Chinhat block of Lucknow district, Uttar Pradesh, India. It is part of Lucknow tehsil. As of 2011, its population is 3,255, in 578 households. It is the seat of a gram panchayat.
