= Semra, Lucknow =

Village in Uttar Pradesh, India

Semra Simra
- Village
- Location in Uttar Pradesh, India Semra (India)
- Coordinates: 26.88206°N 81.04924°E
- Country: India
- State: Uttar Pradesh
- District: Lucknow

Area
  - Total: 1.157 km^{2} (0.447 sq mi)
- Elevation: 119 m (390 ft)

Population (2011)
  - Total: 1,816
  - Density: 1,570/km^{2} (4,065/sq mi)

Languages
  - Official: Hindi
- Time zone: UTC+5:30 (IST)

Semra, also spelled Simra, is a village in Chinhat block of Lucknow district, Uttar Pradesh, India. It is part of Lucknow tehsil. As of 2011, its population is 1,816, in 359 households. It is the seat of a gram panchayat.
