= Mahurakala =

Village in Uttar Pradesh, India

Mahura Kalan Mahura Kalān
- Village
- Location in Uttar Pradesh, India Mahura Kalan (India)
- Coordinates: 26.72884°N 81.12857°E
- Country: India
- State: Uttar Pradesh
- District: Lucknow

Area
  - Total: 0.798 km^{2} (0.308 sq mi)
- Elevation: 115 m (377 ft)

Population (2011)
  - Total: 3,019
  - Density: 3,780/km^{2} (9,800/sq mi)

Languages
  - Official: Hindi
- Time zone: UTC+5:30 (IST)

Mahurakala is a village in Gosainganj block of Lucknow district, Uttar Pradesh, India. As of 2011, its population is 3,019, in 599 households. It is the seat of a gram panchayat.
