= Kalli Pashchim =

Coordinates: 26°43′N 80°54′E

- census town
- Location in India
- Country: India
- State: Uttar Pradesh
- District: Lucknow

Population (2011)
  - Total: 12,157

Languages
  - Official: Hindi
- Time zone: UTC+5:30 (IST)

Kalli Pashchim is a census town in Lucknow district in the Indian state of Uttar Pradesh.
