= Juggaur =

Juggaur Jugor
- Village
- Location in Uttar Pradesh, India Juggaur (India)
- Coordinates: 26.87°N 81.08°E
- Country: India
- State: Uttar Pradesh
- District: Lucknow

Area
  - Total: 8.82 km^{2} (3.41 sq mi)

Population (2011 Census of India)
  - Total: 9,478
  - Density: 1,070/km^{2} (2,780/sq mi)

Languages
  - Official: Hindi
- Time zone: UTC+5:30 (IST)
- PIN: 226010

Juggaur or Jugor is a village in Chinhat block, Lucknow district, Uttar Pradesh, India. As of the 2011 Census of India, the population of the village is 9,478, in 1,590 households. The village code is 0297. It is part of Lucknow tehsil. It is the seat of a gram panchayat.

== History ==
Local tradition holds that Juggaur is a very old town, founded by one Jogi Jagdeo. It served as a Bhar stronghold at the time of the Muslim conquest, and there are three tombs in Juggaur that are said to belong to three Muslim men who died in battle against the Bhars. The main landowning family in Juggaur historically was the Qidwai Sheikhs, who claim descent from one Qazi Qidwat-ud-Din, supposedly a brother of the Sultan of Rum who came to Hindustan in 1184 and was then made governor of Awadh.

At the turn of the 20th century, Juggaur was described as a large, mostly agricultural village in the eastern part of the pargana of Lucknow. It was extensively cultivated and very well irrigated by wells and tanks. Just to the north was the train station, which was on the Oudh and Rohilkhand Railway. The population in 1901 was 2,741, of whom 809 were Muslims and most of the rest were Hindus of the Ahir and Lodh communities.
