= Mastemoo =

Village in Uttar Pradesh, India

- Village
- Location in Uttar Pradesh, India Mastemoo (India)
- Coordinates: 26.8111°N 81.0287°E
- Country: India
- State: Uttar Pradesh
- District: Lucknow

Population (2011)
  - Total: 2,239

Languages
  - Official: Hindi
- Time zone: UTC+5:30 (IST)
- PIN: 226002

Mastemoo is a village in Gosainganj block of Lucknow district, Uttar Pradesh, India. In 2011, its population was 2239 in 344 households. It is administrated by gram panchayat.
