= Sankat Mochan Hanuman Temple, Lucknow =

Hindu Temple in Uttar Pradesh, India

Sankat Mochan Hanuman Temple
- संकट मोचन हनुमान मंदिर
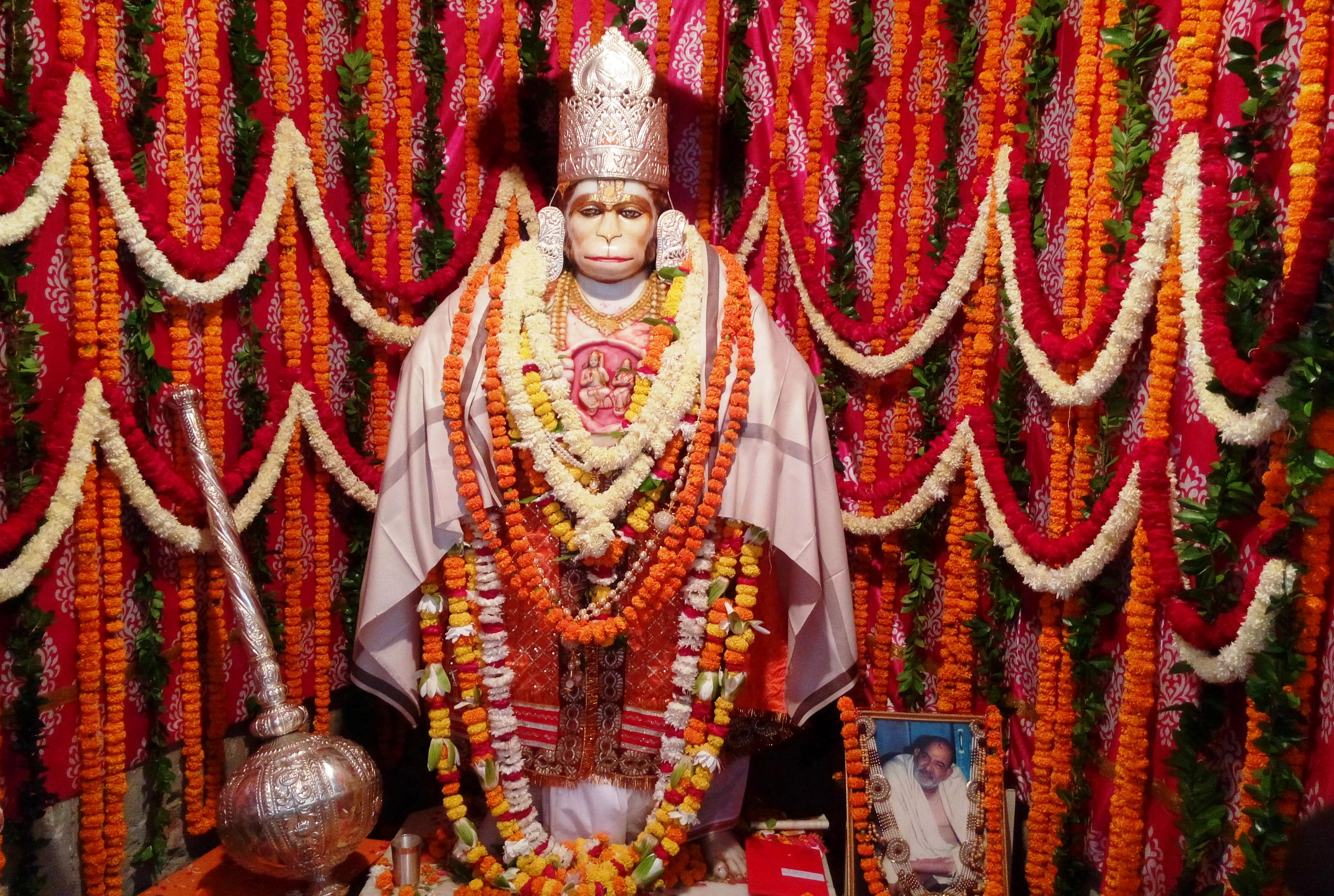

Religion
- Affiliation: Hinduism
- District: Lucknow district
- Deity: Hanuman

Location
- Location: Lucknow
- State: Uttar Pradesh
- Country: India

Architecture
- Type: Hindu architecture
- Elevation: 123 m (404 ft)

Website
- sankatmochan.org

Sankat Mochan Hanuman Temple is a sacred temple of the Hindu god Hanuman in the city of Lucknow, in Indian state of Uttar Pradesh.

== History ==
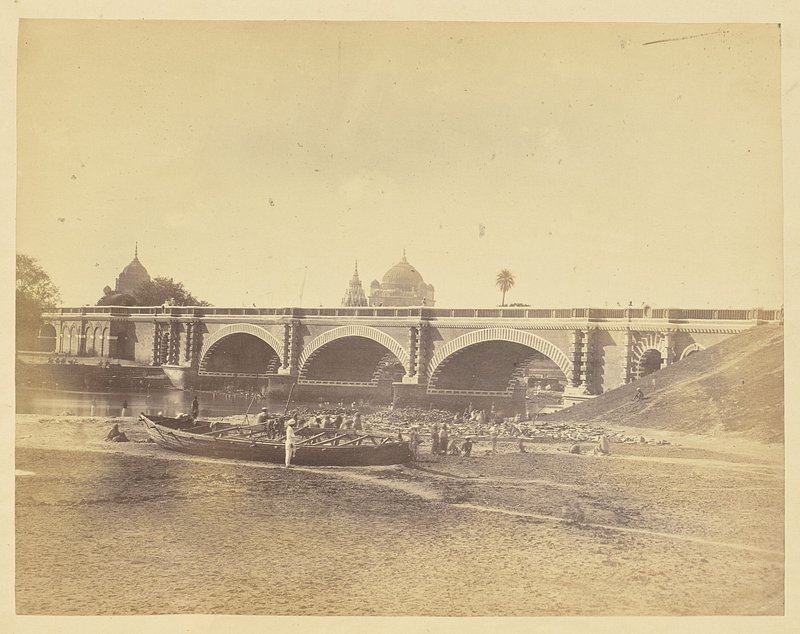
A view of Bruce's Bridge from the site of the temple, ca 1868.jpg

The temple was developed by a Hindu saint Neem Karoli Baba who started by building a small temple on the banks of Gomti River in Lucknow. However, in 1960, a huge flood swept most of Lucknow along with the old bridge near the temple and the old temple. Only the statue was left untouched from the floods. The Government of Uttar Pradesh allotted a plot of land near a newly constructed bridge for the temple's construction.

== See also ==
- Bada Mangal
