= Shahpur, Chinhat =

Village in Uttar Pradesh, India

Shahpur Shāhpur
- Village
- Location in Uttar Pradesh, India Shahpur (India)
- Coordinates: 26.87796°N 81.04543°E
- Country: India
- State: Uttar Pradesh
- District: Lucknow

Area
  - Total: 1.307 km^{2} (0.505 sq mi)
- Elevation: 121 m (397 ft)

Population (2011)
  - Total: 1,554
  - Density: 1,189/km^{2} (3,079/sq mi)

Languages
  - Official: Hindi
- Time zone: UTC+5:30 (IST)

Shahpur is a village in Chinhat block of Lucknow district, Uttar Pradesh, India. It is part of Lucknow tehsil. As of 2011, its population is 1,554, in 285 households. It is now part of Lucknow city.
