= Bharwara =

Village in Uttar Pradesh, India

Bharwara Bharwāra
- Village
- Location in Uttar Pradesh, India Bharwara (India)
- Coordinates: 26.85321°N 81.03483°E
- Country: India
- State: Uttar Pradesh
- District: Lucknow

Area
  - Total: 5.574 km^{2} (2.152 sq mi)
- Elevation: 122 m (400 ft)

Population (2011)
  - Total: 3,876
  - Density: 695.4/km^{2} (1,801/sq mi)

Languages
  - Official: Hindi
- Time zone: UTC+5:30 (IST)

Bharwara is a village in Chinhat block of Lucknow district, Uttar Pradesh, India. It is part of Lucknow tehsil. As of 2011, its population is 3,876, in 678 households.
