= Ant, Lucknow =

Village in Uttar Pradesh, India

Ant Ānt
- Village
- Location in Uttar Pradesh, India Ant (India)
- Coordinates: 27.01316°N 80.71754°E
- Country: India
- State: Uttar Pradesh
- District: Lucknow

Area
  - Total: 1.423 km^{2} (0.549 sq mi)
- Elevation: 131 m (430 ft)

Population (2011)
  - Total: 1,138
  - Density: 799.7/km^{2} (2,071/sq mi)

Languages
  - Official: Hindi
- Time zone: UTC+5:30 (IST)

Ant, also spelled Aunt, is a village in Mal block of Lucknow district, Uttar Pradesh, India. As of 2011, its population was 1,138, in 227 households. It is the seat of a gram panchayat.

== History ==
According to tradition, Ant was originally a stronghold of the Jhojhas, until they were expelled from their forts here and at Mal by the Gaharwar Rajputs. There is an enormous well here, where as many as four bullocks can work at the same time, said to have been built by the Jhojas. There are also the remains of an old wall running from here past Mal to the village of Amlauli.
