= Papnamau =

Village in Uttar Pradesh, India

Papnamau Papnāmau
- Village
- Location in Uttar Pradesh, India Papnamau (India)
- Coordinates: 26.90981°N 81.08928°E
- Country: India
- State: Uttar Pradesh
- District: Lucknow

Area
  - Total: 2.376 km^{2} (0.917 sq mi)
- Elevation: 123 m (404 ft)

Population (2011)
  - Total: 2,363
  - Density: 994.5/km^{2} (2,576/sq mi)

Languages
  - Official: Hindi
- Time zone: UTC+5:30 (IST)

Papnamau is a village in Chinhat block of Lucknow district, Uttar Pradesh, India. It is part of Lucknow tehsil. As of 2011, its population is 2,363, in 431 households. It is the seat of a gram panchayat.
