= Lucknow Police =

Police Department of Lucknow City

Lucknow Police Commissionerate
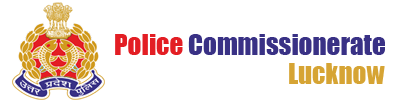
- Logo

- Flag of Uttar Pradesh Police
- Abbreviation: LP
- Motto: ।। वयं रक्षणाय सेवामहे ।। Sanskrit

Agency overview
- Formed: 14 January 2020; 6 years ago

Jurisdictional structure
- Operations jurisdiction: Metropolitan Region, Lucknow, India
- Lucknow Police Jurisdictional Area
- Area: 631 km^{2} (244 sq mi)
- Population: 58.70 Lakhs
- Legal jurisdiction: Lucknow, India
- Governing body: Department of Home; Uttar Pradesh Government
- General nature: Local civilian police

Operational structure
- Headquarters: Office of Commissioner of Police, C-226, J Rd, Vigyanpuri, Shadab Colony, Mahanagar, Lucknow
- Minister responsible: Yogi Adityanath (Chief Minister), Minister of Home
- Agency executive: Tarun Gauba, (IPS), Commissioner of Police
- Parent agency: Uttar Pradesh Police
- Child agencies: Crime Branch; Cyber Crime; Women Crime and Safety; Moter Vehicle; Anti Human Trafficking Unit; Modern Control Room; Lucknow Traffic Police

Facilities
- Stations: 50 (Police Stations)
- Dial 112, Traffic Interceptors, SUV, Bikes: 1,000

Website
- Lucknow Police

The Lucknow Police Commissionerate is the primary law enforcement agency for the city of Lucknow, the capital of Uttar Pradesh, India. It is a police unit of Uttar Pradesh Police and has the primary responsibilities of law enforcement and investigation in Lucknow district.

It is headed by the Commissioner of Police (CP), who is an IPS officer of ADGP rank, and is assisted by two Joint Commissioners of Police (JCP) who is of IG rank, and five Deputy Commissioners of Police (DCP) who are of SP rank.

Of the two Joint Commissioners, one looks after law and order, and the other looks after crime.

The current CP of Lucknow City is I.P.S. Tarun Gauba.

== History ==
Before January 2020, Lucknow District Police came under Lucknow police zone and Lucknow police range of Uttar Pradesh Police. Lucknow zone is headed by an IPS officer in the rank of Additional director general of police (ADG), whereas Lucknow range is headed by an IPS officer in the rank of Inspector General of Police (IG).

Police Administration of Lucknow District was headed by the Senior Superintendent of Police (SSP) who was an IPS officer. He was assisted by seven Superintendents of Police (SP)/Additional Superintendents of Police (Addl. SP) (East, North, West, Rural area, Trans-Gomti, Protocol, Traffic and Crime). The district was divided into twelve police circles, each responsibility of a Circle Officer (CO) in the rank of Deputy Superintendent of Police.

On 13 January 2020, Chief Minister Yogi Adityanath's Cabinet passed the decision of making 2 police commissionerates in the state.

- First in the Lucknow, the capital and the largest city of the state.
- Second one in Gautam Buddha Nagar District.

Home Department of Uttar Pradesh appointed IPS Sujit Pandey as the first Police Commissioner of Lucknow.

== Headquarters ==
Currently, office of the Police Commissioner that serves as the headquarters of the police department has been given temporary space at the office of Forensic Science Laboratory in Mahanagar.

On 5 January 2022, chief minister Yogi Adityanath laid the foundation of a new Hi-tech police commissionerate office that will complete in the time duration of 2 years and will be located next to the DGP residence at Rana Pratap Marg in Dalibagh area of the city. After the completion of the construction, the headquarters will be shifted there.

== Hierarchy ==
Lucknow City Police Commissionerate is headed by an IPS officer of Additional Director General of Police (ADGP) rank, who is appointed by the Home Minister of Uttar Pradesh known as the Commissioner of Police.

Hierarchy is as follows (from high to low level):

Hierarchy of Lucknow Police Commissionerate
S.No	Name of the Post	Abbreviation	Rank	Strength
(1)	Commissioner of Police	CP	ADGP	1
(2)	Joint Commissioner of Police	JCP	IGP	2
(3)	Deputy Commissioner of Police	DCP	SP	10
(4)	Additional Deputy Commissioner of Police	ADCP	Addl.SP	13
(5)	Assistant Commissioner of Police	ACP	ASP/ DSP/ ARO	29
(6)	Police Inspector	Inspector	Inspector	82
(7)	Police Sub Inspector	SI	SI	158
(8)	Head Constable	HC	HC	2642
(9)	Police Constable	Constable	Constable	6749

== Roles and Responsibilities ==
Lucknow is the capital of the state and is the center of wide range of political, cultural, social and economic activities. The Lucknow Police has to play a number of roles so far maintenance of law and order is concerned. The department undertakes the following activities:

- Investigating crimes
- Controlling criminal activities
- Protection of citizens
- Control traffic problem

As Lucknow is the seat of the Uttar Pradesh Government, the Vidhan Bhawan and the Secretariat of Uttar Pradesh is situated here. For the security of both this important government building and offices there is an additional team of Lucknow Police headed by ADCP who looks after these buildings for law and order in surroundings.

Traffic control is very important, in order to avoid accidents and Lucknow police has taken several measures to control the traffic such as implementing Integrated Traffic Management System (ITMS) in the city.

== Helplines ==
Lucknow Police has Helpline numbers through which people can seek help without going to the police station in person. The various Helpline numbers of Lucknow City Police are as follows;

- Police Control Room- 112
- Fire- 101
- Ambulance- 108/102
- Women helpline- 1090
- Child helpline- 1098
- Citizen call centre- 155300
- Complain against Govt. Department- 1076
- Toll free number of Chief Minister- 0522-2239296, 2236167

== Structure, Zones, Divisions and Police Stations ==
=== Structure ===
The Commissionerate is headed by Commissioner of Police who is of ADG rank and assisted by two Joint Commissioner of Police (JCP) of IG rank and DIG rank.

There are currently 5 zones which all are headed by Deputy Commissioner of Police (DCP) and inside the zones there are total 13 divisions those who all are headed by the Assistant Commissioner of Police (ACP).

There are currently total 50 police stations that comes under police commissionerate.

=== Zones, Divisions and Police Stations ===
5 zones of Police Commissionerate-

North Zone, East Zone, Central Zone, West Zone and South Zone.

Inside these zones there are 13 divisions -

Aliganj Division, Gazipur Division, Mahanagar Division, Cantt Division, Gomti Nagar Division, Hazaratganj Division, Alambagh Division, Krishnanagar Division, Chowk Division, Bazarkhala Division, Kaiserbagh Division, Mohanlalganj Division and Kakori Division. All 40 police stations lie inside these divisions.

==== North Zone ====
===== Aliganj Division =====
(1) Aliganj PS

(2) Mariyaon PS

(3) Jankipuram PS

===== Gazipur Division =====
(1) Gazipur PS

(2) Gudamba PS

(3) Indira Nagar PS

===== Mahanagar Division =====
(1) Mahanagar PS

(2) Hasanganj PS

(3) Vikasnagar PS

==== East Zone ====
===== Cantt Division =====
(1) Cantt PS

(2) Ashiyana PS

(3) PGI PS

===== Gomti Nagar Division =====
(1) Gomti Nagar PS

(2) Gomti Nagar Extension PS

(3) Chinhat PS

(4) BBD PS (Babu Banarasi Das PS)

==== Central Zone ====
===== Hazaratganj Division =====
(1) Hazaratganj PS

(2) Husainganj PS

(3) Gautampalli PS

(4) Women (Mahila) PS

===== Alambagh Division =====
(1) Alambagh PS

(2) Manaknagar PS

===== Krishnanagar Division =====
(1) Krishnanagar PS

(2) Sarojini Nagar PS

(3) Banthara PS

==== West Zone ====
===== Chowk Division =====
(1) Chowk PS

(2) Wazirganj PS,

(3) Thakurganj PS

===== Bazarkhala Division =====
(1) Bazarkhala PS

(2) Saadatganj PS

(3) Talkatora PS

===== Kaisarbagh Division =====
(1) Kaisarbagh PS

(2) Aminabad PS

(3) Naka PS

==== South Zone ====
===== Mohanlalganj Division =====
(1) Mohanlalganj PS

(2) Nagaram PS

(3) Gosainganj PS

(4) Sushant Golf City PS

===== Kakori Division =====
(1) Kakori PS

(2) Para PS

(3) Dubagga PS

== Commissioners of Lucknow Police ==
Police Commissioner of Lucknow
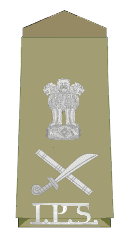
- Rank Insignia of the Police Commissioner (Additional Director General Rank)
- Incumbent; Tarun Gauba (IPS) since 29 July 2026
- Style: The Honorable
- Appointer: Home Minister of Uttar Pradesh
- Inaugural holder: IPS Sujit Pandey
- Formation: 14 January 2020; 6 years ago
- Deputy: Joint Commissioner of Police (JCP)

Police Commissioner of Lucknow is the chief of the city police commissionerate. The police commissioner is appointed by the Department of Home and Confidential on the recommendation by the Establishment Board, which includes Minister of Home (Uttar Pradesh Government), Additional Chief Secretary and other senior bureaucrats.

The police commissioner is an Indian Police Service (IPS) officer of ADGP rank.

Police Commissioners of Lucknow
S.No	Name	Rank	From	Till	Duration	Ref.
1	IPS Sujit Pandey	ADGP	14 January 2020	18 November 2020	309 days	
2	IPS Dhruv Kant Thakur	ADGP	18 November 2020	1 August 2022	1 year, 256 days	
3	IPS SB Shirodkar	ADGP	1 August 2022	22 June 2024	1 year, 326 days	
4	IPS Amarendra Kumar Sengar	ADGP	23 June 2024	28 July 2026	2 years, 35 days	
5	IPS Tarun Gauba	ADGP	29 July 2026	Incumbent	108 days	

== Special Agencies ==
Lucknow City Police Commissionerate is currently having 5 special agencies under it for the welfare of citizens-

1. Crime Branch
2. Cyber Crime
3. Women Crime and safety
4. Motor Vehicle
5. Anti Human Trafficking Unit

All these units are headed by Assistant Commissioner of Police (ACP).

== Insignia ==
=== Gazetted Officers ===
Indian Police Service cadre officers rank insignia
Insignia
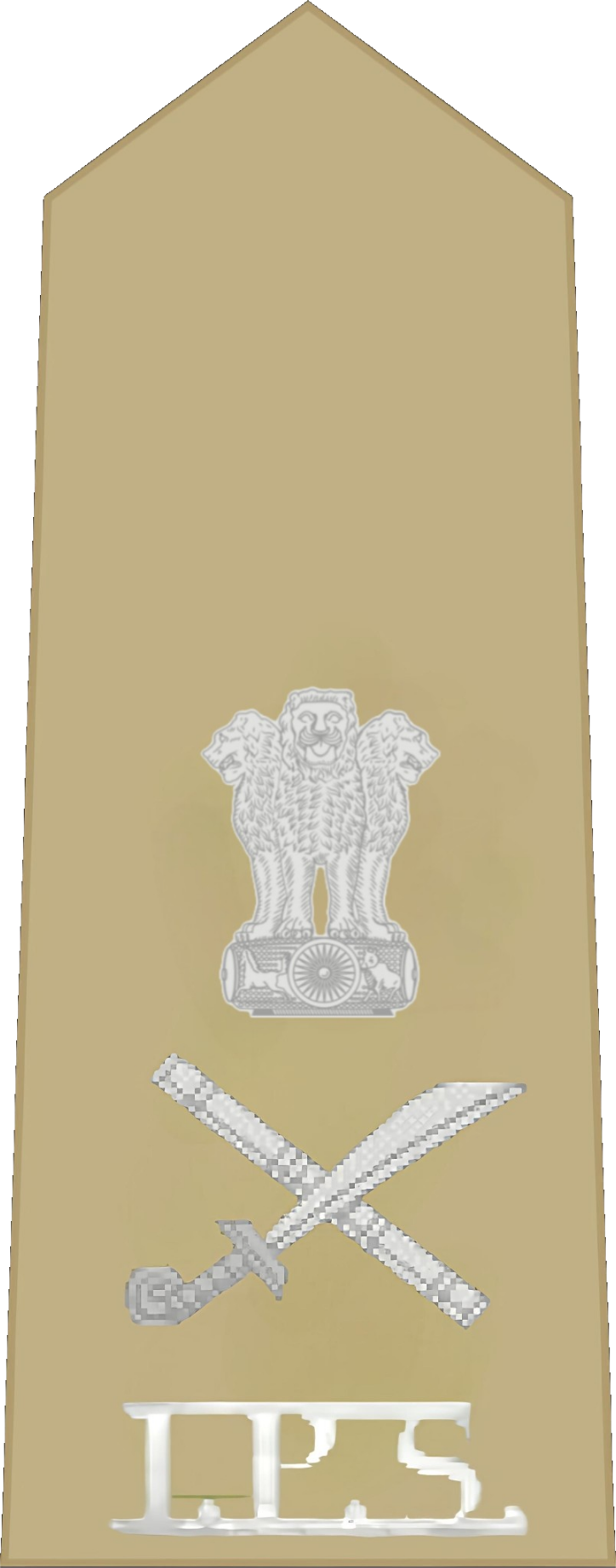
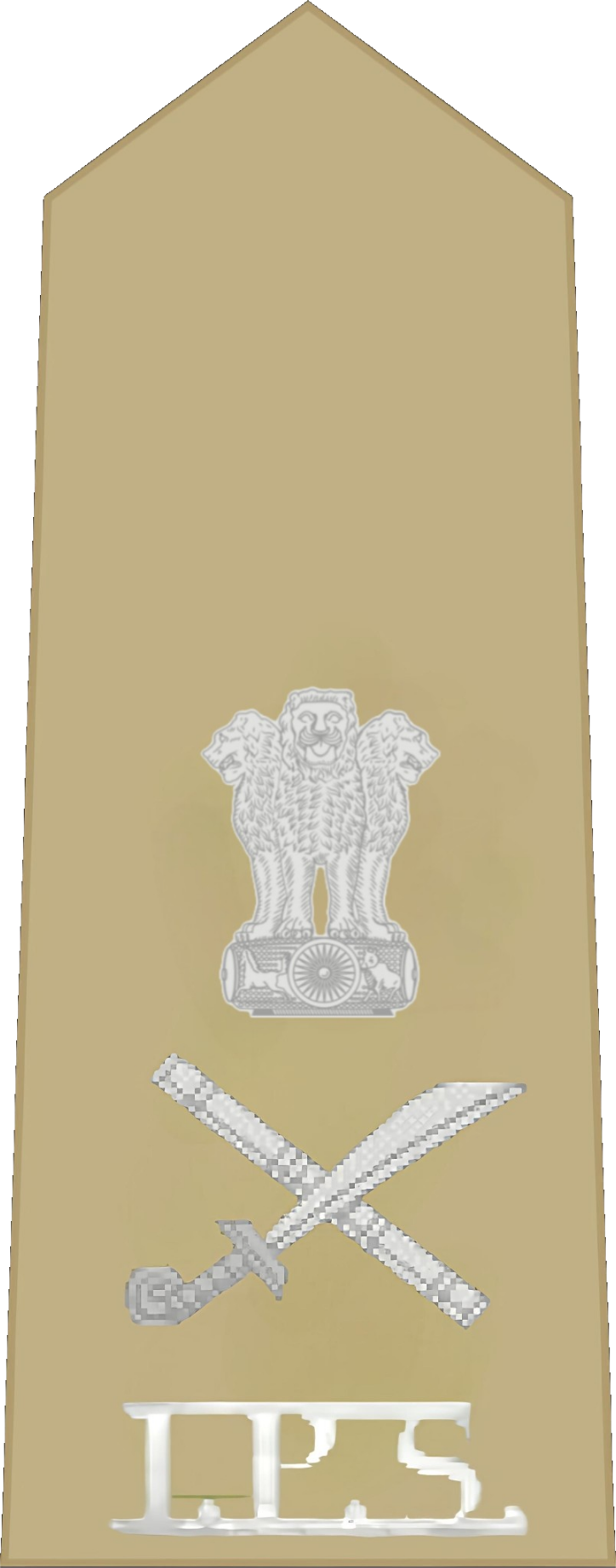
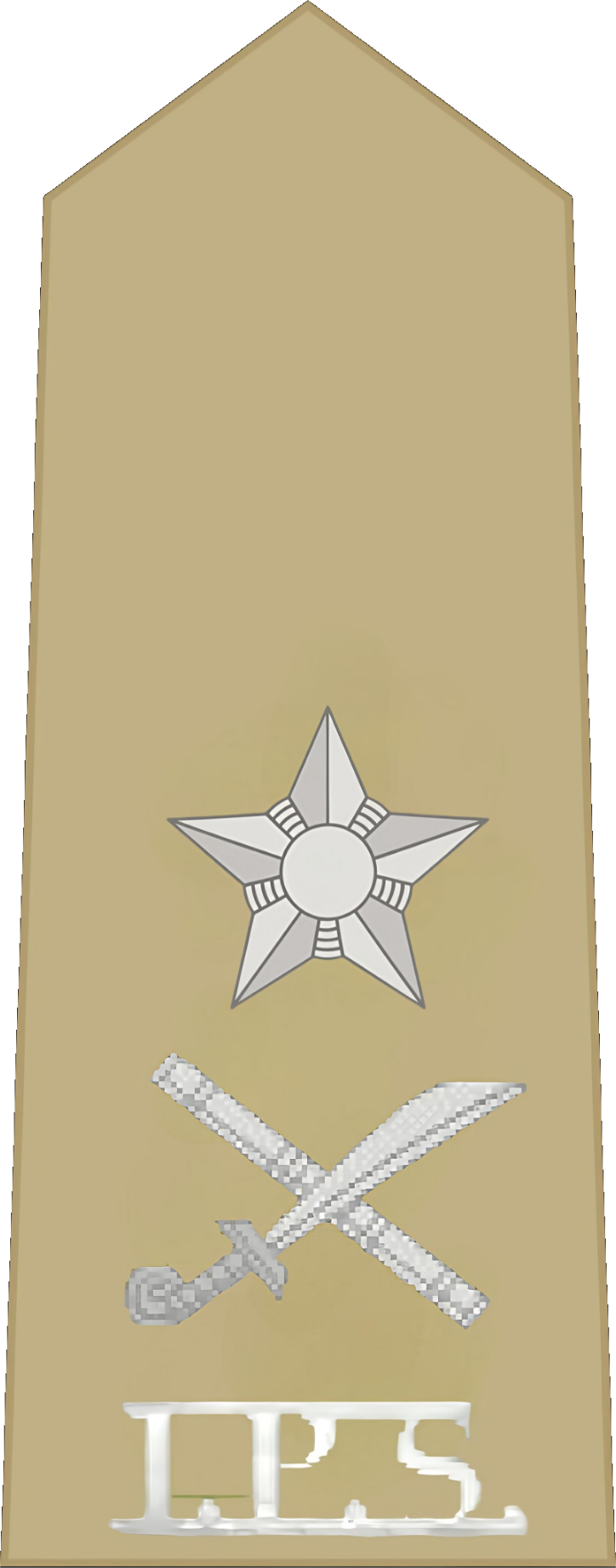
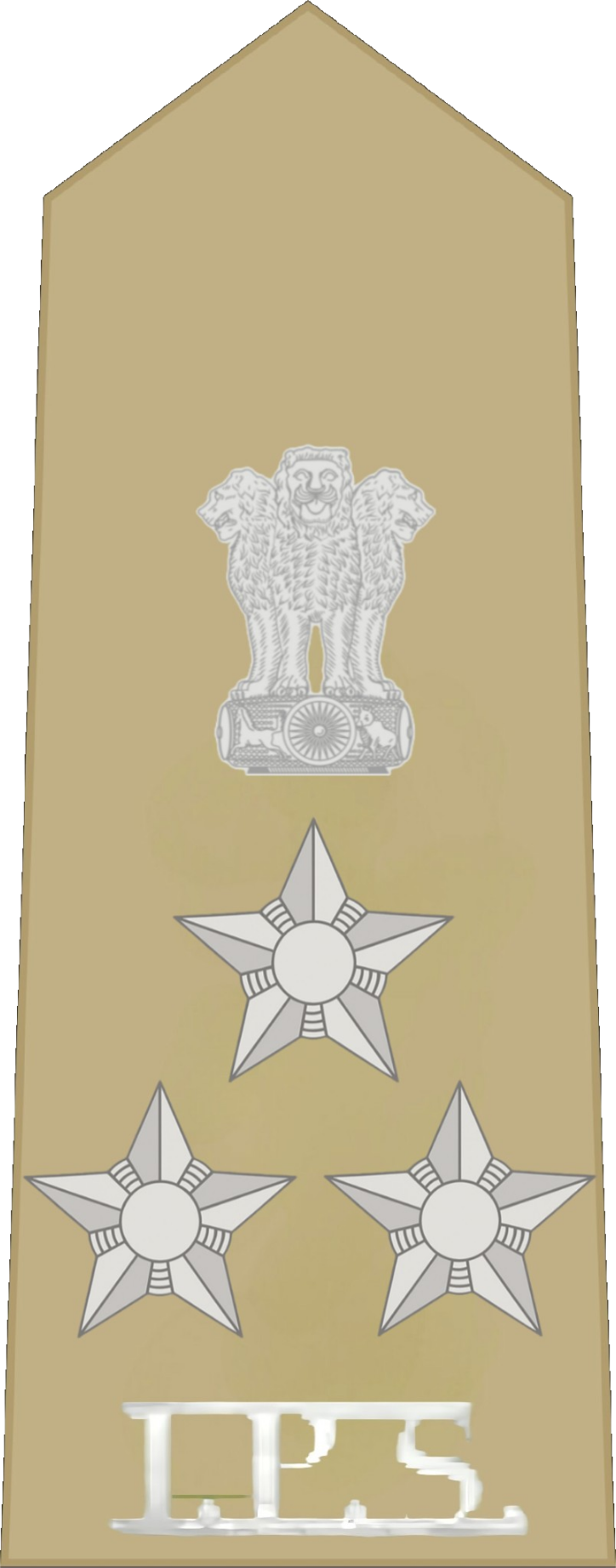
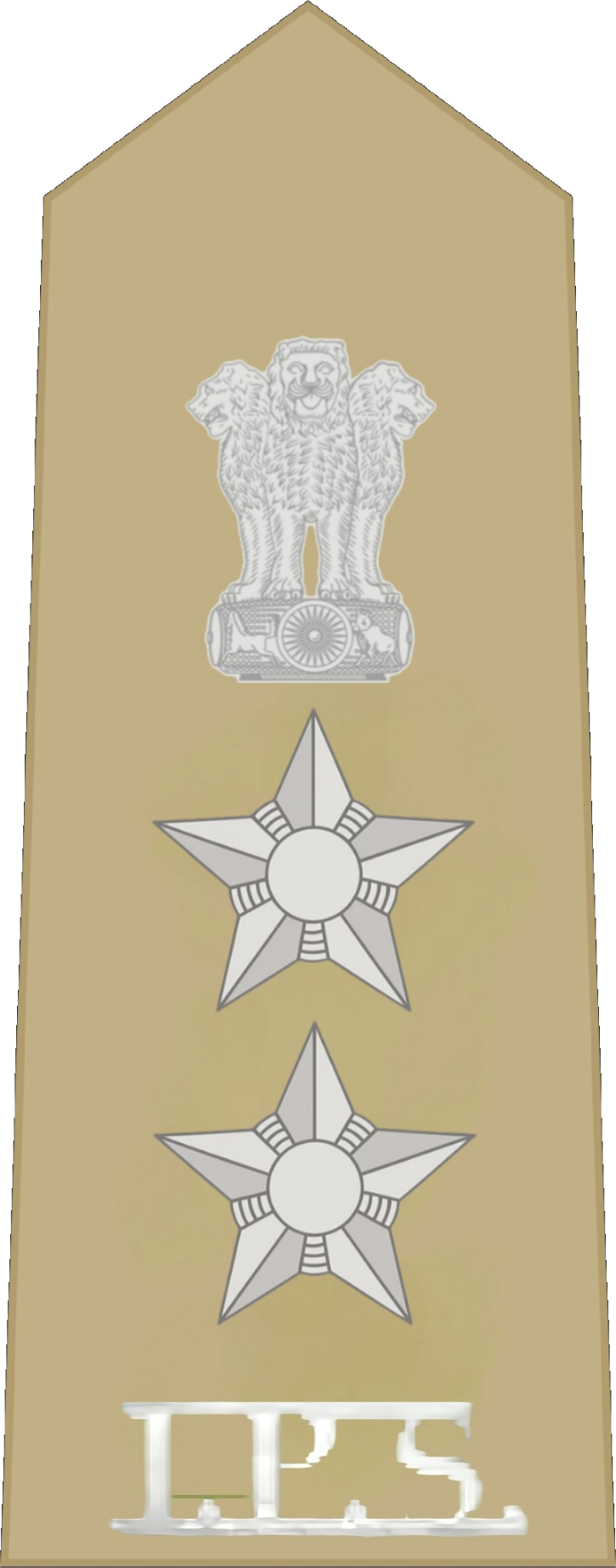
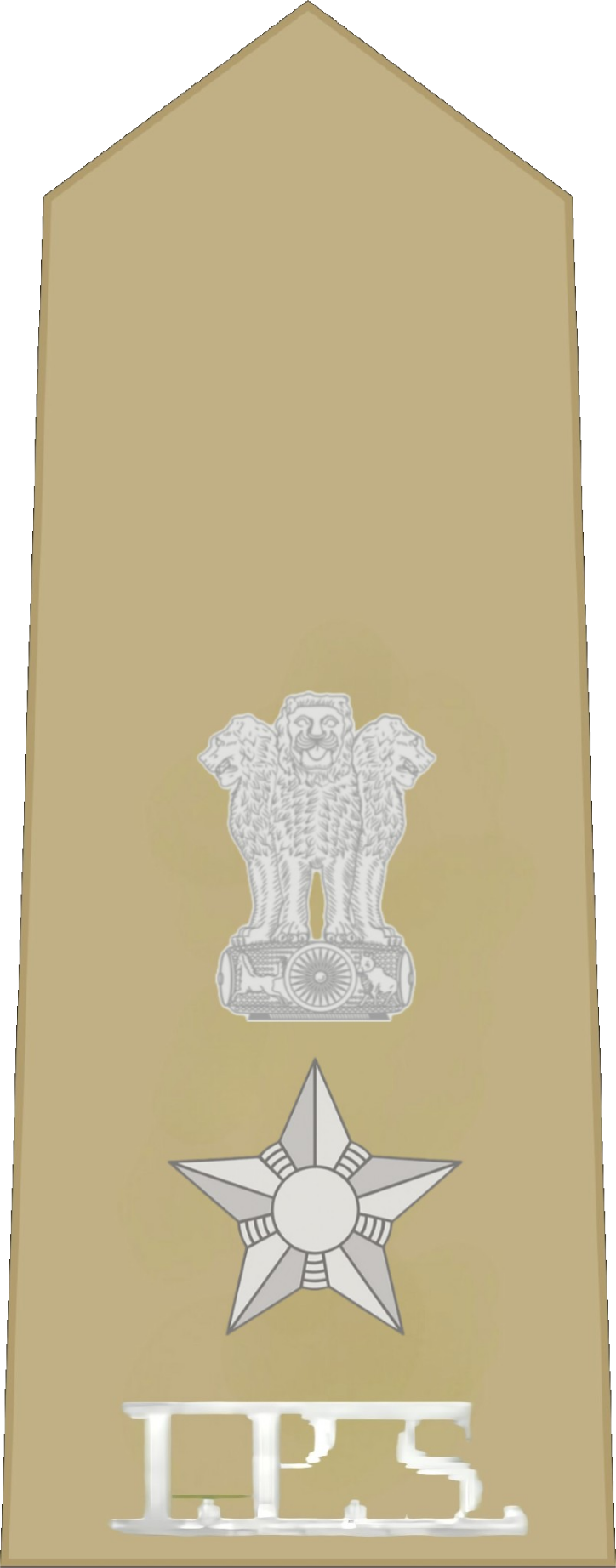
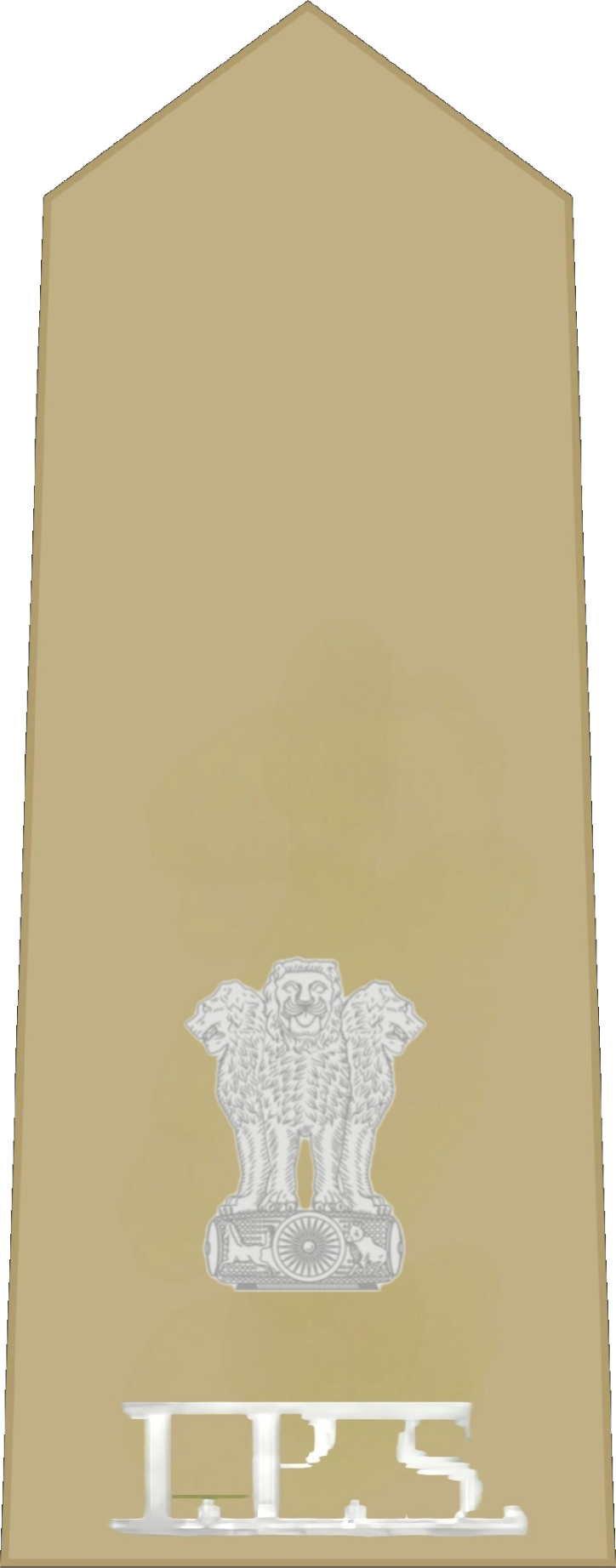
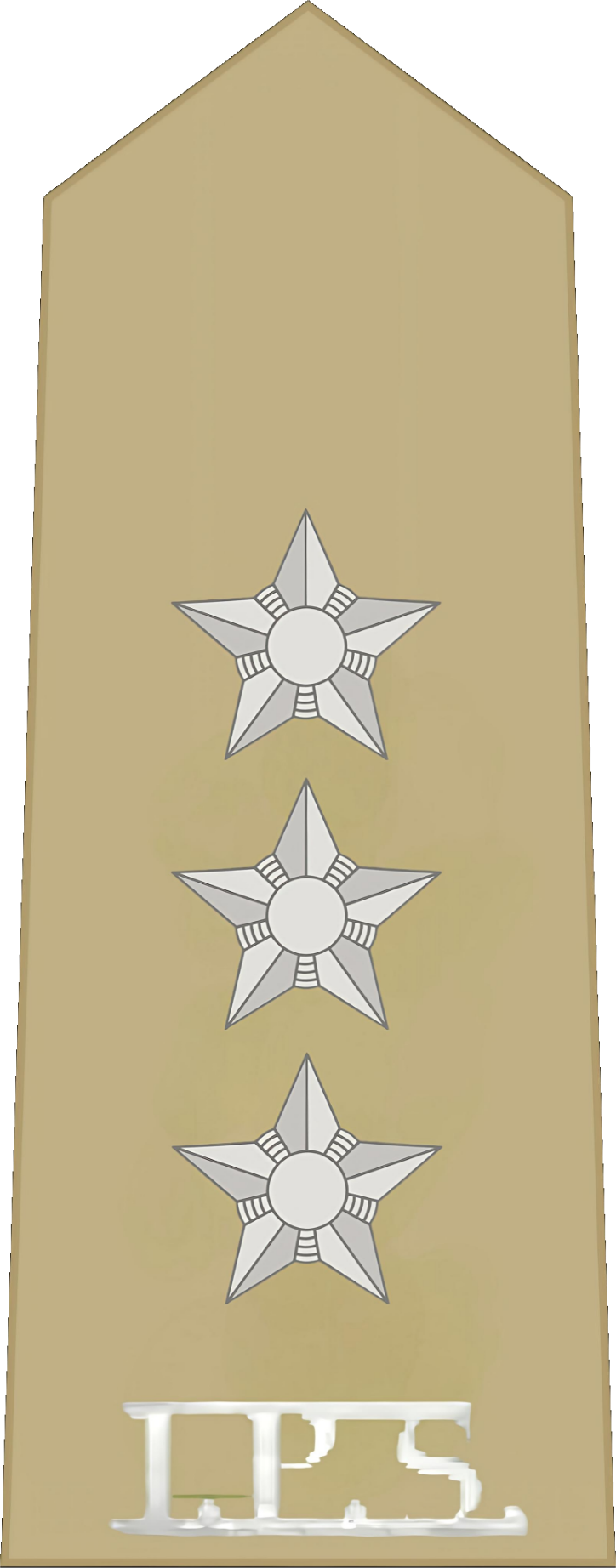
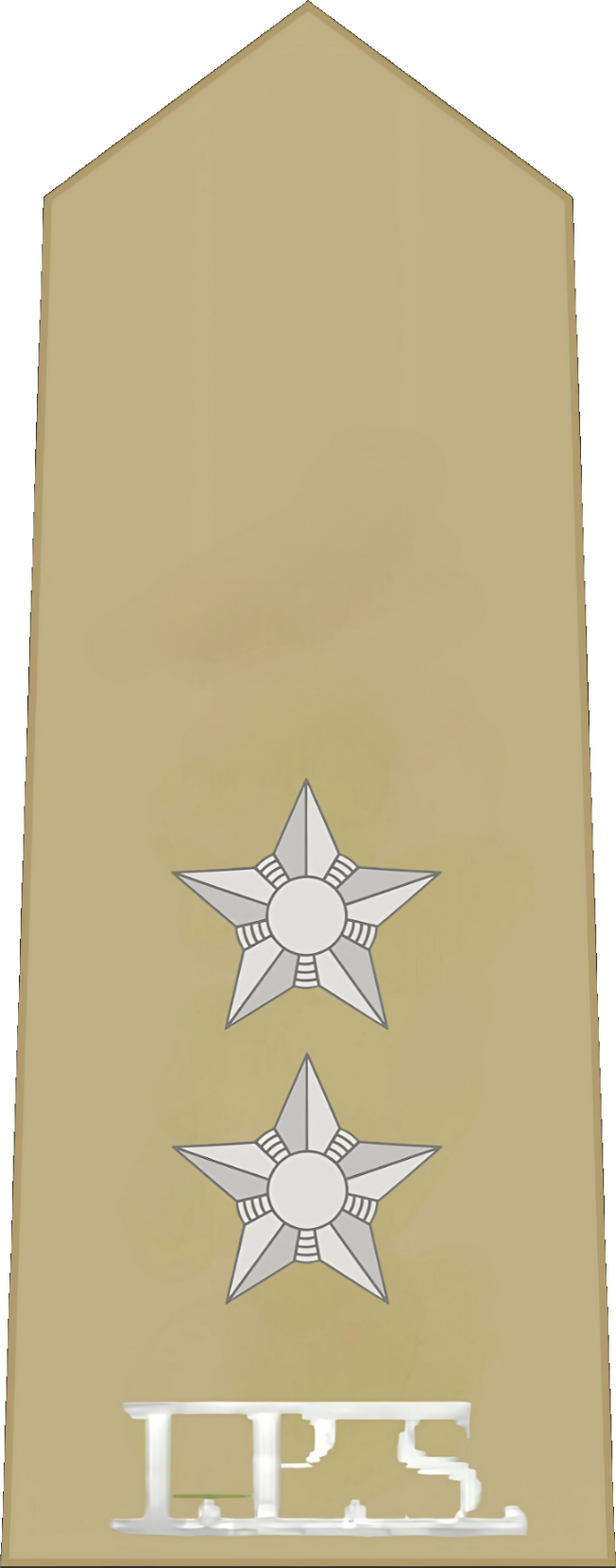
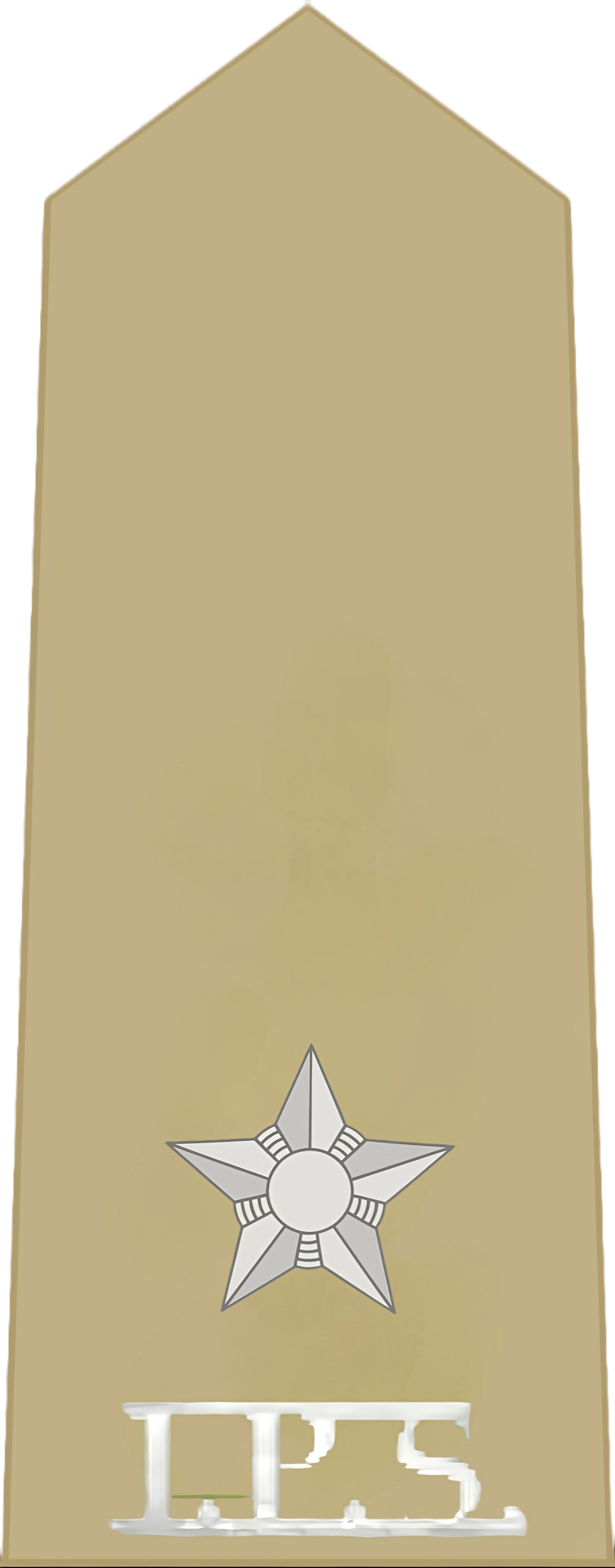
Rank
Director General of Police
Additional Director General of Police (Note: Rank insignia of DGP is similar to Additional DGP.)
Inspector General of Police
Deputy Inspector General of Police
Superintendent of Police (Selection Grade) (Note: The Senior Superintendent of Police (SSP) is a post, not a rank, typically held by an SP (selection grade or junior grade) in states like Uttar Pradesh, Jammu and Kashmir, and Punjab.)
Superintendent of Police
Additional superintendent of police
Assistant Superintendent of Police
Assistant superintendent of police (Probationary for two years)
Assistant Superintendent of Police (Probationary for one year)
Abbreviation
DGP
ADGP
IGP
DIGP
SP (SG)
SP
Addl.SP
ASP
ASP
ASP

- Note 1: The rank insignia of DGP, Spl.DGP, Addl.DGP is the same.
- Note 2: The equivalent rank to the ASP (Asst.SP) in State Police Services is the deputy superintendent of police (DSP/DySP).
- Note 3: The commissioner of police is a post typically held by DIG and above rank officers.

=== Non-gazetted Officers ===
Indian Police non-gazetted officers rank insignia
Insignia
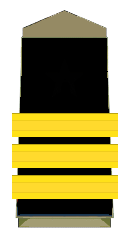
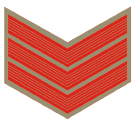
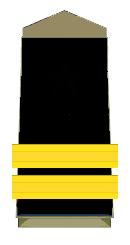
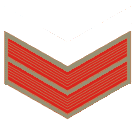
No insignia
Rank
Inspector of Police
Inspector / Circle Inspector (Note: Inspector or Circle Inspector with One Five-Pointed Star insignia exists in West Bengal Police.)
Assistant Police Inspector (Note: This rank exists only in the Maharashtra Police.)
Sub-Inspector
Sergeant (Kolkata Police)
Assistant Sub-Inspector
Head Constable (Note: Shoulder insignia rank only used in the Maharashtra Police.)
Senior Constable (Note: This rank is also known as senior constable, constable grade-I, and exists only in some state police forces.)
Police constable
Abbreviation
INSP
INSP / CO
API
SI
Sgt
ASI
HC
SC
PC

- The rank of Sergeant is used in India only in the Bihar Police and the Kolkata Police
- The One Five Pointed Star for the rank of Inspector is used by Police forces of 7 states viz. West Bengal, Jharkhand, Bihar, Sikkim, Assam, Nagaland and Tripura. This is because Inspectors of Police in these 7 states are Gazetted Officers. However, the Kolkata Police uses the Four Pointed Star of the Order of Bath for the ranks of Inspector and Assistant Commissioner of Police instead of Five Pointed Star. For the ranks of ASI, SI/Sergeant and Deputy Commissioner of Police, the usual Five Pointed Star is used
- Colour pattern and size of chevrons may vary according to the different rules of several distinct Indian State Police services.

== Online Presence ==
Lucknow Police has an official handle on X and also has social media accounts on other platforms.

== Lucknow Traffic Police ==
Lucknow Traffic Police has the job of managing the flow of traffic in the city. It is the traffic police unit within the Lucknow Police.

== See also ==
- Uttar Pradesh Police
- Kanpur Nagar Police Commissionerate
- Gautam Buddha Nagar Police Commissionerate
- Varanasi Police Commissionerate
