= Mal, Lucknow =

Village in Uttar Pradesh, India

Mal Māl
- Community Development Block
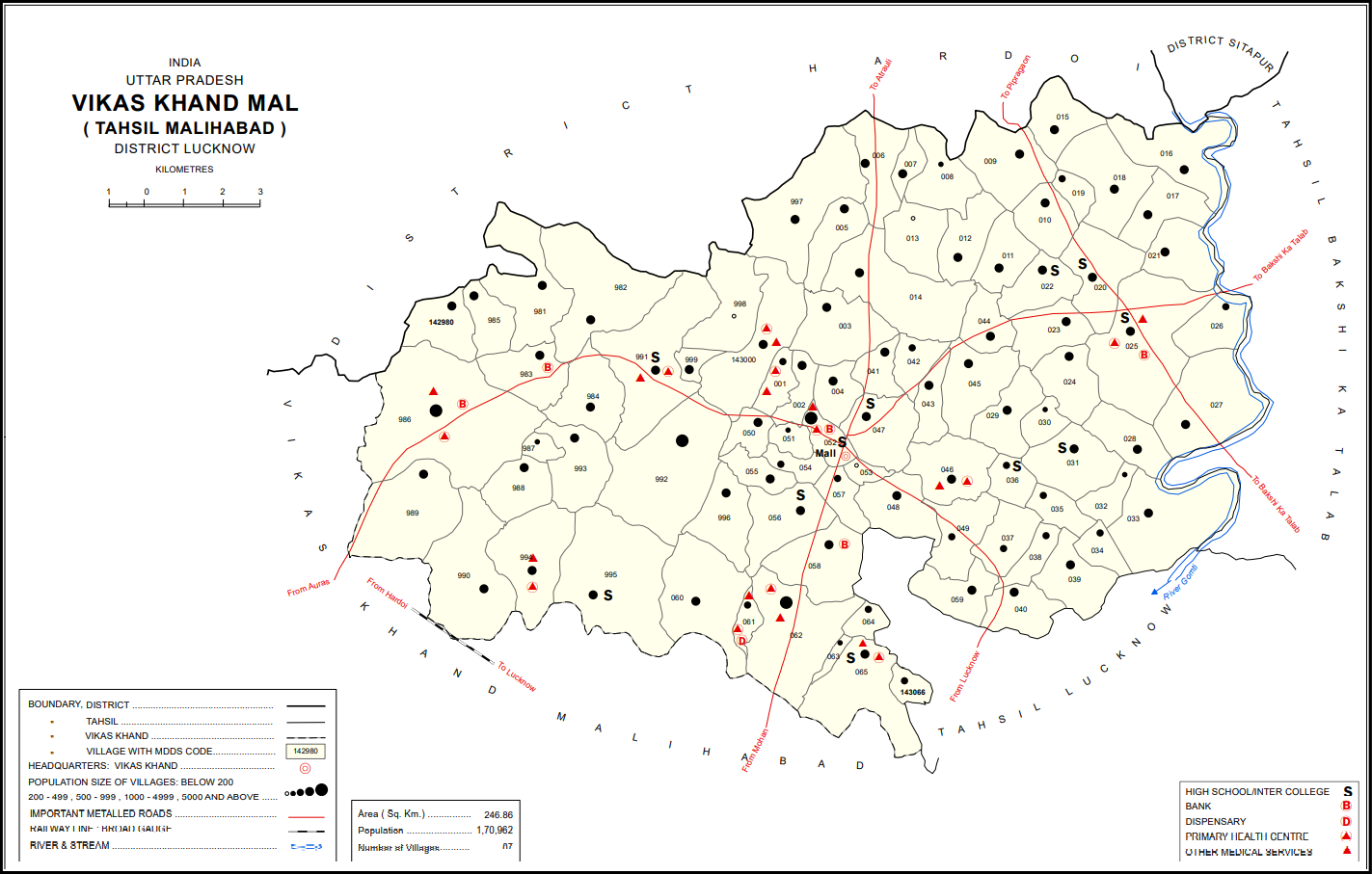
- Map of Mal CD block

- Location in Uttar Pradesh, India Mal (India)
- Coordinates: 27.02156°N 80.73584°E
- Country: India
- State: Uttar Pradesh
- District: Lucknow

Area
  - Total: 2.619 km^{2} (1.011 sq mi)
- Elevation: 130 m (430 ft)

Population (2011)
  - Total: 6,429
  - Density: 2,455/km^{2} (6,358/sq mi)

Languages
  - Official: Hindi
- Time zone: UTC+5:30 (IST)
- PIN: 226104
- Vehicle registration: UP32

Mal, also spelled Mall, is a village and corresponding community development block in Lucknow district of Uttar Pradesh, India. It is part of the tehsil of Malihabad. As of 2011, the population of Mal was 6,429, in 1,199 households, while the population of Mal block was 170,962, in 31,429 households.

== History ==
Mal was historically the seat of a tribe of Gaharwar Rajputs, whose family tradition states that they came from Manda-Bijaipur near Varanasi under one Rai Paitawan, a brother of the ruler of Varanasi. The story goes that Rai Paitawan had gone on a pilgrimage to Nimkhar, in what is now Sitapur district, and after encountering a good omen on the way back, he decided to stay in this area. He drove out the ruling Jhojhas from their forts at Mal and Ant to become ruler himself. The Gaharwars' territory later became divided among seven estates: Mal, Atari, Salinagar, Amlauli, Masira, Hamirpur, and Nabipanah. By the turn of the 20th century, the Gaharwars' influence had declined, and they only owned about a quarter of the village lands in Mal. The remainder of the lands were held by Pandit Bakht Narain.

At the turn of the century, Mal had a population of 1,775, and it had a marketplace called Ramnarainganj after its founder, Pandit Ram Narain (Bakht Narain's father), which hosted markets twice a week, on Thursdays and Sundays. There was also a weekly cattle market. Three fairs were held here annually: the Athon fair during the month of Chait, the Mahabir fair in Jeth, and the Janamashtami fair in Bhadon. Mal's soil was described as highly fertile, and wheat was the main crop grown. Irrigation was provided by wells, tanks, and also some from the Jhingi nala, which flows to the east of the village. There were at the time two Hindu temples, one mosque, and also the mausoleum of a saint named Gulmir Shah.

== Villages ==
Mal block comprises the following 87 villages:

Village name	Total land area (hectares)	Population (in 2011)
Vahir	246.6	1,244
Ahindar	391.7	3,876
Umraval	606.5	3,380
Rahata	251.9	1,886
Siswara	294.4	2,011
Gorava Baravki	177.4	2,131
Saspan	1,180.1	8,378
Kamaluddin Nagar	52	486
Gopal Pur	219.2	1,601
Tilan	556.2	2,289
Jamolia	581.8	4,628
Gahndo	650.9	4,957
Thari	755.3	5,175
Barkhorava	295.9	1,717
Muriyara	413.6	2,975
Kharsara	743.4	3,557
Saidapur	309.8	2,562
Auntgarhi Saura	643.5	4,532
Visunpur	141.6	145
Karend	292.7	2,467
Para Bhadrahi	487.2	4,451
Navbasta	106.7	781
Shahmau	114.2	1,117
Atari	338.8	2,308
Roodan Khera	164.1	1,021
Jindana	180.8	1,050
Mawai Khurd	294	1,556
Basant Pur	372.6	2,883
Bhelam Pur	45.4	491
Birpur	391.6	1,885
Devari Ganja	191.8	1,073
Akbar Pur	181.8	1,024
Shankar Pur	221.1	1,906
Godhan	107.6	157
Saleh Nagar	534.1	3,962
Raipur	246	1,343
Badiya	412.4	3,083
Tikari Kala	262.8	1,155
Kamalpur Lodhaura	361.3	1,086
Didhara	87.9	782
Pipari Kurakhar	298.8	2,443
Bahraura	225	1,813
Pakara	206.4	1,626
Devari Bharat	246.8	1,258
Shahpurgorava	234	1,370
Madwana	770.4	4,393
Ataria, Lucknow	207.9	810
Manjhi Nikrojpur	500.6	2,484
Majhauva	234.4	1,016
Danaur	233.2	1,506
Sultanpur	92.3	337
Aumau	369	2,245
Khakhara	118.1	447
Kolava Bhanaura	562.2	2,136
Adampur	106.9	756
Garhthamma	120.7	541
Latifpur	116.6	969
Gauraiya	189.8	974
Jagdishpur Bujurg	104.6	903
Patauna	209.1	1,786
Sarthara	208.7	1,736
Keraura	105.2	1,438
Amlauli	139.4	626
Peer Nagar	159.7	1,064
Gumsena	158.4	1,257
Ranipara	306	1,844
Narayanpur	318.2	1,285
Ram Nagar	234.1	2,259
Naibasti Bhithaura	369	2,112
Sukka Khera	165	999
Chandwara	112.7	1,209
Bhanwar	75.9	238
Mal (block headquarters)	261.9	6,429
Naru	40.2	183
Vidhishyama	102.3	566
Ant	142.3	1,138
Masirha Ratan	283.3	3,196
Gagan Barauli	102.6	565
Masirha Hamir	365.4	2,279
Saibasi	193.9	1,392
Hasanapur	514.3	3,913
Devari Danda	76.3	943
Nabi Panah	573.3	5,136
Ibrahimpur	48.7	354
Bhanpur	63.6	995
Dhakhava	444.5	4,133
Dautpur	68.7	749
