= Sri Ramakrishna Math, Lucknow =

Indian monastic organisation for men

Sri Ramakrishna Math, Lucknow श्री रामकृष्ण मठ, लखनऊ
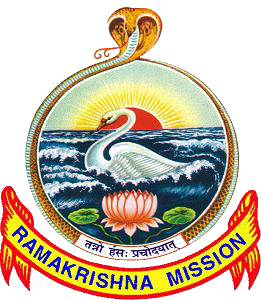
- Emblem

- Location in Uttar Pradesh

Religion
- Affiliation: Hinduism
- District: Lucknow

Location
- Location: Nirala Nagar, Lucknow
- State: Uttar Pradesh
- Country: India
- Coordinates: 26°52′27″N 80°56′24″E

Architecture
- Type: Fusion of Hindu, Buddhist, Rajput, Christian styles
- Creator: Ramakrishna Mission
- Completed: 1987
- Inscriptions: none

Website
- ramakrishnalucknow.org

Sri Ramakrishna Math, Lucknow is a monastic organisation for men created by Ramakrishna (1836–1886), a 19th-century saint of Bengal. The motto of the Ramakrishna Math and Ramakrishna Mission is: "For one's own salvation, and for the welfare of the world". It contains idols of Ramakrishna, Swami Vivekananda and Holy Mother Sarada Devi.

== History ==
In 1857, with the end of the Sepoy Mutiny, the Nawabi era also came to a halt. English took over the reins of several regions in Northern India. To help them in their work, several educated people and senior officials from Bengal travelled out to various regions, with some coming and settling in Lucknow. Around this time the Great Indian Sage, Swami Vivekananda, took upon himself the task of spreading the message of his teacher, Sri Ramakrishna: That God lives in each human being, so service to man is service to God. With this, a new school of thought began to evolve in the late nineteenth century in India. In no time he had a great following, especially from amongst the youth of the country.

The first set-ups in Northern India took shape in the religiously historical towns of Kankhal, Varanasi, Vrindaban and Allahabad. Soon, the set-up arrived in Lucknow and a centre was established under the leadership of Sarat Chandra Bandhopadhaya. He had a large following of devoted youths who would gather every evening to discuss the paths laid out by Swamiji to relieve India of misery and pain. What inspired these torchbearers most was that Swamiji had himself travelled through their city on different occasions, on one such occasion, he had reached Lucknow with some of his brother disciples.

Swami Vivekananda reached Lucknow in 1888, while on pilgrimage to Varanasi and Ayodhya. The Islamic culture and history of this ancient Nawabi state had impressed Swamiji to such a great extent that he revisited the place when his followers from Lucknow requested him to spend some time with them. In the summer of 1897, Vivekananda thus broke journey on his way to Kathgodam to be with these friend-followers. Exactly a year later, May 1898, he again visited Lucknow. This time he was on his way to meet the Seviers who had invited him to Almora. This visit is indeed historical as his brother disciples Turiyananda, Niranjananda, as well as his own disciples Sadananda, Sister Nivedita, and Macleod accompanied him.

During this tour Swamiji was acquainted with a local Muslim leader in Nainital, Md. Sarfaraz Hussain. He wrote a letter to Hussain on 10 June 1898 which reveals Vivekananda's belief that synthesis of all religious ideals is the exact essence of India.

Towards the end of the following year Vivekananda once again for the last time halted in this city, though for a few hours, during his visit to Mayavati.

It was with these inspiring landmarks, that Sarat Chandra Bandopadhaya had begun the task of serving the people here. He with his men had a tiny shack in Gulab-Niketan, Hewett Road. Not much had been recorded during Bandopadhaya's time. Later many from far and wide were drawn towards the activities of this centre especially when one Brahmachari Biresh Chaitanya took up the missionary work. People say that in all probability it was Sarat who gave up on his worldly life and had been named Biresh Chaitanya.

With the passage of time the need for a larger space was felt. At this juncture, an eminent Bengalee Barrister of the city and music lover, Atul Prasad Sen coaxed the city municipality to hand over some worthy place to these monks. An apt place in Aminabad was given immediately to the group and work began with full fervour from this new centre. The centre began functioning under a managing committee in an organized way since early 1924, when it came to be known as the Ramakrishna Mission Sevashrama. It was then affiliated to its headquarters at Belur, in Howrah District, West Bengal in July 1925.

The first records available are from the Accounts details of different centres that are kept at Belur Math. The records of 1924-25 states that a group of dedicated monks are running a centre from Aminabad under the management of a local committee. The records further state that annually there visited 17,628 patients who were attended to in the outdoor unit. Besides, 215 ailing were given financial aid. Both during the communal strife and the Floods in Lucknow, this group took up immense relief in 1924. A school was also run, where free education was imparted during the evening hours to the labourers and their children. Around 24 students from them were also given financial aid to pursue further studies. A small library was set up for the general public within the same premises.

The next records are those available in the records of General Body Meeting of the year 1925-1927. Here the status of the new Sevashrama at Lucknow was publicly announced. It was during these years that for the first time someone from Belur Math was assigned to take up the reins of the work of the Missionary at Lucknow. Swami Deveshananda, popularly addressed as Prabhas Maharaj thus reached Lucknow in July 1925. In the following General Body Meeting records (1928- 1930), the number of patients at the Outdoor clinic increased by a hundred (17728), along with this for the first time an Emergency Department was opened, and an indoor facility was set up with only two beds.

The next three years witnessed 143 patients visiting the Outdoor clinic daily, whereas 141 patients were attended to in the indoor facility. There were 60 students attending the night school whereas the library had 1377 books. Around this time the local committee was finally set up under the leadership of Swami Sarvananda from Belur Math. Nalini Behari Haldar, the then secretary of the committee, helped him. Swami Deveshananda continued to work along with the newly appointed Head.

At the annual meeting at Belur, suggestions to have a hospital at Lucknow was taken up in July 1925. A dispensary was started in Aminabad which catered to the medical needs of all irrespective of caste or creed. The generous attitude of the monks here attracted hundreds of patients from all over the city, and in no time it popularly came to be known as' Swami-ji- ka dawakhana'; (The Swamiji's Hospital).

Swami Lokeshwarananda (himself a doctor) was especially sent, from Belur Math in 1938, who became extremely popular during his stay in Lucknow. In the following year, May 1939, Swami Virajananada, the President of the Ramakrishna Math and Ramakrishna Mission, Belur, visited the clinic. He was extremely moved and happy, looking at the work of the Sadhus in Lucknow. The Sadhus would spend not less than four to five hours daily attending to each patient personally.

Around this time a library and a school was set up in the same premises. In 1949 Swami Gaurishwarananda (Rammoy Maharaj) was sent as the head of the centre in Lucknow and he served the centre till 1966 when he left for Belur Math. He was a direct disciple of Sri Ma Sarada Devi. His childlike simplicity and love for nature made him a popular Sadhu in no time. Till date, he is remembered as one of the most affectionate monks of the Math in Lucknow.

At one time all this appeared almost impossible, especially with the kind of problems the monks had to face in Aminabad. With the Sevashram having no outward symbol, people from a different community were planning to build their worship centre in the park right opposite the monastery. Besides violating the municipality rule, this would also mean a source of disturbance to the usual serene and quiet atmosphere that is imperative for the Ramakrishna Math. It was a difficult task to convince these enthusiasts that a temple dedicated to Sri Ramakrishna, Sarada Ma and Vivekananda was present inside the premises that they believed was only a medical centre.

The local devotees came to the support of the monks and quickly constructed a tiny Shiva temple and began to worship it. Rammoy Maharaj remained amazed at this help extended by the devotees, which solved the problem once and for all. Work carried on smoothly thereafter. The Shiva temple since then has been worshipped, till date people believe that this temple has divine powers of removing all hurdles.

During his tenure, the Sevashram moved from its 43-year-old abode in Aminabad to Chandganj in the trans-Gomti area. Impressed with the missionary work, the then Chief Minister, Chandrabhanu Gupta, the first Chief Minister of Uttar Pradesh, handed over 4.86 acres of land to the Monks who were all out to serve the people in this area.

After the land was handed over by Chandrabhanu Gupta, construction work of the Vivekananda Polyclinic and the Ashrama gradually gained momentum. The area soon was named Vivekanandapuram. On 5 January 1967, the Sevashram finally shifted here under Swami Sridharananda (Salil Mahraj) who was heading the institute in Lucknow at that time. In June 1970, the President of the Ramakrishna Math and Mission, Belur, Swami Vireshwarananda formally inaugurated the Polyclinic.

== Temple ==
The new temple was constructed adjacent to the old shrine and opened on 2 February 1987. The temple is built in marble, a favourite of the Mughal architect emperor Shah Jahan. The marble has been especially obtained from the mines of Bundi and Makrana. To add an element of contrast, a style innovated by the Mughals, (using red sandstone along with marble) has been adopted in this temple.

The figures from mythology such as the Shankha (conch shell), Chakra (disc), Padma (lotus), Trishul (Trident), Damaru (drum), Vajra (Thunderbolt) and Hansas (swans) have all been painted with red cement. These have been placed right from the gateway to the temple door.

The temple stands out as a unique combination of various styles of architecture that includes those imbibed by the Chandellas, Chalukyas and Pallavas of Southern India besides the Mughals and the Jains.

=== Gateway ===
There is an elaborate gate that leads to the main temple; the stairway is made out of streaked Makarana Marble, like the rest of the temple.

Both sides of this gateway are adorned by the figures of Gaja, (the elephant), Nandi (the bull), Shardul (the lion) and Garuda, the carriers of Lakshmi, Shiva, Shakti and Vishnu respectively. Red cement has been used aesthetically in figures etc. Though figurines from Indian mythology have been placed artistically right up to the door of the main shrine,

At the main gate of the temple, the Logo (monogram) of the Ramakrishna Math and the Ramakrishna Mission has been fixed inside huge glass frames right above the door. At the gate of the Natmandir two intricately carved wooden dwarpalas (doorkeepers) - Jaya and Vijaya, of about three feet height appear guarding the temple.

These are well synchronized with carvings on the wooden doors of about eight feet by fourteen feet. Keeping to mythology, Ganeshji is seated right above the Gate of Natmandir. It has been beautifully etched out in combinations of brass and copper. A similar form is seen on the Gate of Garbha Mandira below which is the Dashavatara (ten incarnations of Vishnu) carved on a wooden panel. The door to the Garbha Griha is flanked on either side by carved peacocks, which are associated to God Kartikeya. All these including the two flags that are on the top of this door reminds of the Southern Gopurams.

=== The Garbha Mandir (Sanctum Santorum) ===
The Garbha Griha which is the innermost chamber of the temple has nine domes, which is a copy similar to the temple dedicated to Shri Ramakrishna at Belur Math. Four domes in four corners surround a centre dome and lending a stair-like effect with identical four domes that are constructed right beneath the upper four domes.

Emulating the Bengal school of architecture, four umbrellas have been built on four sides of the main dome. The windows and terraces are a copy of the Rajput style of architecture, while the cemented lattice design (Jali) resembles Muslim architecture. The height of main dome is 90 feet from the ground. Inside the Sanctum Sanctorum cut out profiles from photos of Sri Ramakrishna, Sri Sri Ma Sarada Devi and Swami Vivekananda have been placed. These are worshipped daily. The photos have been enlarged digitally and then painted in oil colour media.

The canopy on the top is fixed on a wooden frame on which a Hansh (swan), lotus, and a damru (a tiny drum) and a trishul (trident) have been carved out. The 'Holy Trinity' is seated under this canopy, on three respective marble pedestals, atop which a wooden lotus has been carved out. A Hamsa(Swan), Padma(Lotus) and Vajra (thunderbolt) have been fixed at the middle of each of these pedestals at about one foot from the floor. Above the deity is the main dome decorated in heavy Zari, which is essentially Muslim style. By the side of the Sanctum Sanctorum is the Shayan Ghar (resting-place) for deities the furniture, which have been especially designed and made in Gujarat. To create the apt ethos, different symbols like Kamadhenu (wish-fulfilling celestial cow), Airavat (celestial elephant) related to Hindu Mythology have liberally used on the doors and glass panes.

=== The Nat Mandir (Prayer Hall) ===
The floor of the congregation hall is done up decoratively with geometric patterns created out of contrasting colours of white marble and brown Kumri range stone. Lotus made out of large copper plates have been placed artistically on the floor, which once again adds to the religious mood of the temple. The ceiling of the Natmandir (prayer hall) is dome shaped, typical of a Jain temple. In the centre of the ceiling is a beautifully carved wooden, circular panel from which hangs a big chandelier with 256 lights have been arranged in three different tiers. Two circular beams support the inner dome, on which hang pictures of the 15 direct disciples of Sri Ramakrishna. Between each is carved out two wheels one inside the other denoting the spread of religion - dharma chakra. These wheels closely resemble the wheels of the Sun temple at Konark.

On the extreme northern side of the circular beams the monogram of Ramakrishna Math and Ramakrishna Mission has been placed with Swamiji's explanation in English. Keeping in view the widely celebrated Durga Puja, the Natmandir was designed to adjust the Durga mandap within the same temple complex. The Durga Mandap is thus an extended part of the main building with its door facing outside for the benefit of all devotees who throng to watch the ceremonial Puja held every year. The size of Natmandir is of 5,100 square feet with its dome shaped like an inverted lotus, the petals of which are curled out, an idea imported from the Buddhist Pagodas of the Far East. This 51 feet high dome, circular in shape, with sixteen petals weighs 250 tons and rests on four pillars.

== Ramakrishna Mission Sevashrama ==
The polyclinic was inaugurated by Swami Vireshwarananda, the President of the Math and Mission, in June 1970.
