= Kabirpur, Gopalganj =

Village in Bihar, India

Kabirpur is a large village in Sidhwalia, Gopalganj district, Bihar, India, with a population of 3400 as of 2011.
