= Chinahat =

Chinhat
- Block
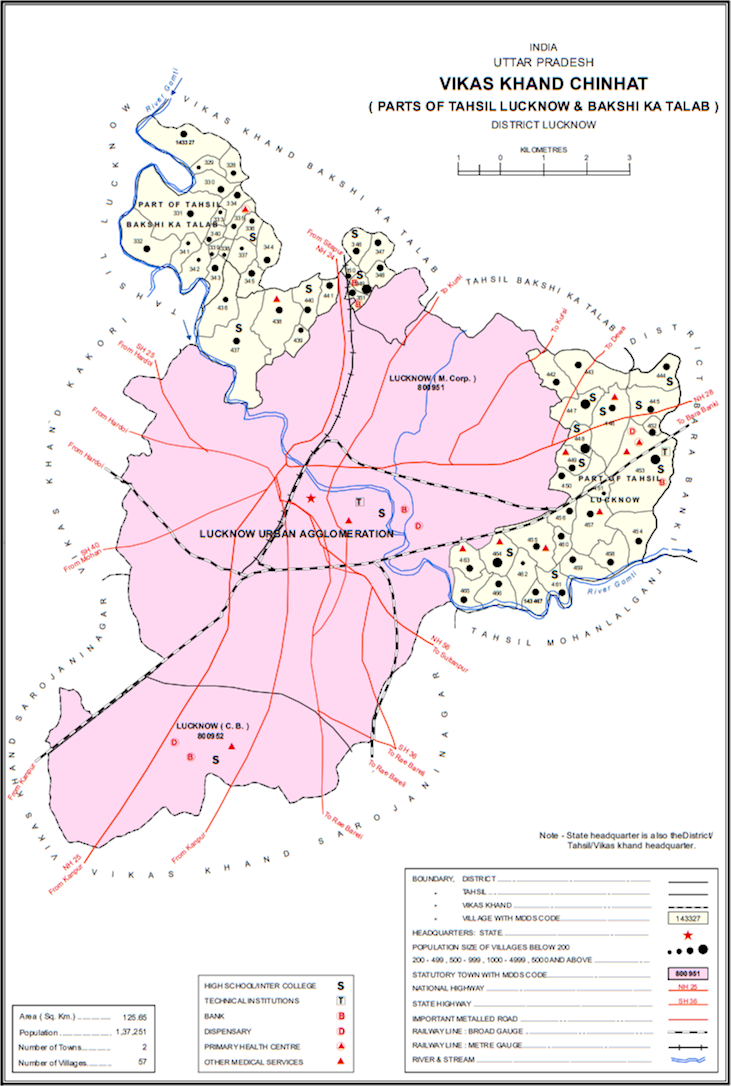
- Map of Chinhat CD block

- Location in Uttar Pradesh, India Chinhat (India)
- Coordinates: 26.87°N 81.03°E
- Country: India
- State: Uttar Pradesh
- District: Lucknow

Population (2011 Census of India)
  - Total: 137,251

Languages
  - Official: Hindi
- Time zone: UTC+5:30 (IST)
- PIN: 226028

Chinhat is a block in Lucknow City, Uttar Pradesh, India. According to the 2011 Census of India the population of the village is 137,251 out of whom 71,211 are males and 66,040 are females. The village code is 0297. Lucknow serves as the block headquarters. The block is part of two tehsils, with some parts belonging to Lucknow tehsil and other parts belonging to Bakshi Ka Talab tehsil.

== List of villages ==
Chinhat block contains the following 57 villages:

Village name	Total land area (hectares)	Population (in 2011)	Tehsil
Raitha	628.4	3,286	Bakshi Ka Talab
Pashchim Gaon	124.4	767	Bakshi Ka Talab
Purwa	101.1	460	Bakshi Ka Talab
Dhatingra	187.2	2,027	Bakshi Ka Talab
Borumau	744.3	2,870	Bakshi Ka Talab
Duggor	376.5	1,813	Bakshi Ka Talab
Laxmi Pur	49.2	493	Bakshi Ka Talab
Sairpur	127.6	1,076	Bakshi Ka Talab
Poorab Gaon	49.2	671	Bakshi Ka Talab
Farrukhabad	123.4	842	Bakshi Ka Talab
Saidapur	156.5	460	Bakshi Ka Talab
Kamlapur	37.5	213	Bakshi Ka Talab
Kamlabad	45.5	391	Bakshi Ka Talab
Kondri Bholi	75.2	642	Bakshi Ka Talab
Dhovaila	116.8	470	Bakshi Ka Talab
Khataiya	155.6	436	Bakshi Ka Talab
Sarora	345	2,776	Bakshi Ka Talab
Palhri	206.8	1,310	Bakshi Ka Talab
Narharpur	174.5	1,182	Bakshi Ka Talab
Tiwaripur	124.7	1,138	Bakshi Ka Talab
Mirzapur	150.4	1,528	Bakshi Ka Talab
Saidpur Jagir	97.1	1,053	Bakshi Ka Talab
Khargapur Jagir	124.3	15,658	Bakshi Ka Talab
Muhiuddinpur	76.1	877	Bakshi Ka Talab
Bhitoli Khurd	78.4	2,241	Bakshi Ka Talab
Alinagar	78.5	722	Lucknow
Ghaila	661.2	3,323	Lucknow
Allu Nagar Diguria	413.9	3,521	Lucknow
Kakoli	107.4	860	Lucknow
Mutkkipur	164.6	2,593	Lucknow
Raipur	118.4	3,330	Lucknow
Naubasta Kala	233.3	2,578	Lucknow
Dhawa	337.3	2,518	Lucknow
Papnamau	237.6	2,363	Lucknow
Anora Kala	292	2,698	Lucknow
Uattardhona	386	4,386	Lucknow
Ganeshpur Rahmanpur	275.2	6,670	Lucknow
Semra	115.7	1,816	Lucknow
Shahpur	130.7	1,554	Lucknow
Sarai Shekh	243.2	3,364	Lucknow
Tera Khas	99.7	490	Lucknow
Narendi	29.5	1,051	Lucknow
Juggaur	882	9,478	Lucknow
Mehora	311.7	1,441	Lucknow
Bharwara	557.4	3,876	Lucknow
Nijampur Malhor	192.8	4,906	Lucknow
Lolai	342.6	3,255	Lucknow
Sikanderpur Khurd	228.3	1,360	Lucknow
Devariya	221.2	2,149	Lucknow
Thasemau	95.7	1,233	Lucknow
Lonapur	196.8	1,322	Lucknow
Bhaisora	168.5	409	Lucknow
Makhdoom Pur	161.4	3,209	Lucknow
Khargapur	203.5	9,459	Lucknow
Malesemau	246.1	3,828	Lucknow
Badhamau	198.1	1,688	Lucknow
Chandiyamau	159	1,113	Lucknow
