= Floods in Lucknow =

City in India commonly affected by floods

Lucknow is a city in the state of Uttar Pradesh, India, situated on the banks of the Gomti River, a tributary of the Ganges. The city experiences a humid subtropical climate and has historically been affected by floods caused by heavy rainfall, river overflow, and breaches in embankments.

== 1923 ==
In 1923, Lucknow experienced a devastating flood with an estimated discharge of 75,000 cusecs, severely affecting several low-lying areas. This was one of the earliest recorded floods in the city's history, caused by heavy monsoon rainfall that led the Gomti River to overflow its banks, submerging many parts of the city. The flood impacted the old city, civil lines, and cantonment areas, damaging property, crops, and infrastructure, and forcing many people to seek shelter in higher places. It also disrupted communication and transportation systems, posing a serious threat to public health and safety.

== 1960 ==
The 1960 Lucknow flood was caused by the overflow of the Gomti River following heavy rainfall in the Himalayan region. After the 1923 flood, the Buttergani area was protected by the construction of a marginal embankment. However, in 1960, this area was severely affected when water breached the embankment at two points, allowing approximately 30,000 to 40,000 cusecs of water to enter the low-lying areas. The flood submerged nearly half of the city under several feet of water, making it one of the worst floods in Lucknow's history.

The flood affected various parts of the city, including the old city, civil lines, cantonment, and the main shopping centre. It also damaged the electricity supply, zoological gardens, and several historical monuments. In the flooded areas, elephants, bicycle rickshaws, and boats were used for transportation. The government deployed army units and helicopters to rescue stranded people and distribute relief materials. The water level receded very slowly, and no official estimate was made of the total damage. The flood coincided with a tidal wave that struck the mouth of the Ganges in Bangladesh on 16 October 1960, killing more than 3,000 people.

== 1971 ==
The 1971 Lucknow flood was caused by two breaches in the embankment of the Gomti River. These breaches occurred as the river's water level rose six feet (about two metres) above the danger mark due to heavy monsoon rainfall. The flood submerged several parts of the city under three to four feet (one to 1.2 metres) of water, affecting the main shopping area, some residential neighbourhoods, and the zoological gardens. It also disrupted the electricity supply, communication, and transportation systems, posing risks to public health and safety.

On 7 September, at least 13 deaths due to drowning were reported in Uttar Pradesh, bringing the total death toll from two months of rain and flooding in the state to 268. In Lucknow, a quarter of the city's area was underwater by 8 September. The government deployed the army and civilian engineers to repair breaches in the embankment and rescue stranded people. More than 25,000 people were evacuated from the city within 24 hours and housed in 18 camps set up by the state government. Elephants, boats, and helicopters were used for transportation and relief efforts in the flooded areas.

The flood also impacted animals in the Lucknow Zoo, with some being placed on raised platforms or protected using sandbags and boulders. The 1971 flood was the second highest on record in Lucknow, with a discharge of 107,000 cusecs.

== 2008 ==
The 2008 Lucknow flood was a natural disaster that occurred in August 2008, caused by the overflow of the Gomti River following heavy monsoon rainfall. The flood submerged several parts of the city, affecting more than one lakh people and claiming at least 15 lives. It also caused extensive damage to property, crops, and infrastructure. The state government declared Lucknow one of the 11 flood-affected districts and deployed army units and helicopters for rescue and relief operations.

The heavy rainfall raised the water level of the Gomti River above the danger mark of 8.5 metres (28 feet) in Lucknow. The river also received additional water from its tributaries, including the Sai, Kathana, and Kukrail. The flood situation was worsened by the city's inadequate drainage system, which was unable to handle the runoff from urban areas. Encroachment on floodplains and wetlands due to illegal constructions further reduced the river's natural capacity to absorb excess water.

The flood primarily affected low-lying areas along the Gomti River, with the worst-hit localities including Daliganj, Nishatganj, Aminabad, Chowk, Thakurganj, Alambagh, Rajajipuram, and Indira Nagar. Floodwaters entered numerous houses, shops, offices, schools, hospitals, and religious places, forcing people to evacuate or seek shelter on rooftops or higher ground.

The flood also disrupted power and water supplies, communication, and transportation systems, with many roads and bridges either damaged or submerged, making them impassable. Additionally, it posed serious risks to public health and safety due to the spread of waterborne diseases and the threat of electrocution.

== 2021 ==
In 2021, a flood struck Lucknow and its surrounding districts, raising the water levels of the Gomti River and its tributaries. Many areas of the city were inundated, including roads, bridges, railway tracks, and residential colonies. The flood also disrupted power and water supplies, as well as health services. Authorities deployed boats, helicopters, and drones to evacuate people and provide relief materials.

== See also ==
- Floods in India
- List of floods
- List of deadliest floods
- Brahmaputra floods
