= Gosainganj, Lucknow =

Gosainganj
- Town
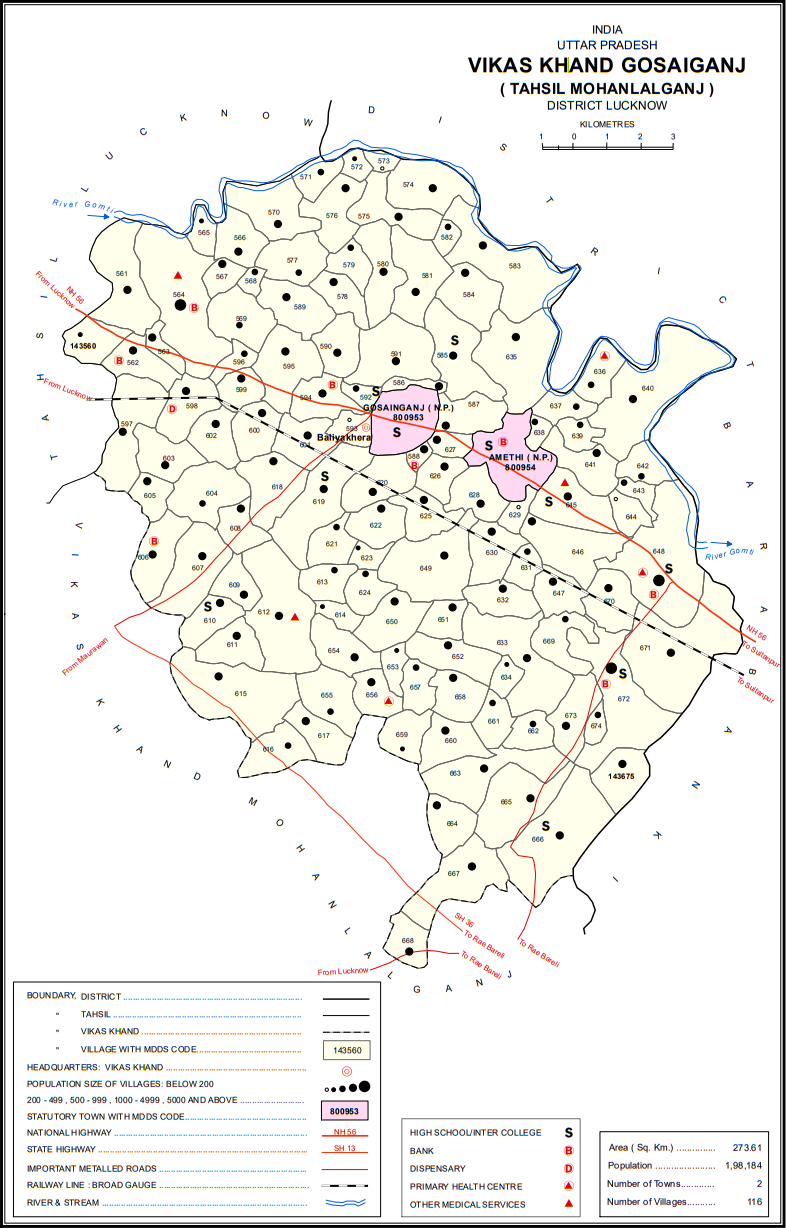
- Map of Gosainganj CD block

- Location in Uttar Pradesh, India
- Coordinates: 26.77°N 81.12°E
- Country: India
- State: Uttar Pradesh
- District: Lucknow

Government
  - Mayor: Nikhil Mishra

Area
  - Total: 5.9 km^{2} (2.3 sq mi)
- Elevation: 113 m (371 ft)

Population (2011)
  - Total: 9,649
  - Density: 1,600/km^{2} (4,200/sq mi)

Languages
  - Official: Hindi
- Time zone: UTC+5:30 (IST)
- Postal code: 226501
- Vehicle registration: UP-32

Gosainganj, also spelled Goshainganj or Gosaiganj is a town and nagar panchayat in Lucknow district of Uttar Pradesh, India. It is the seat of a community development block, which is included in the tehsil of Mohanlalganj. As of 2011, its population is 9,649, in 1,685 households. The starting point of the Purvanchal Expressway i.e. Chand Saray village is situated 2.5 km away from Gosainganj.

== Geography ==
Gosainganj is located at 26.77°N 81.12°E. It has an average elevation of 113 meters (374 feet). Gosaiganj is located 20 km from Lucknow city on Lucknow to Sultanpur Highway (NH-56) and about 22 km from Lucknow Charbagh Railway Station.

== History ==
Gosainganj dates back to the Nawabi period in the 18th century, during the reign of Shuja-ud-Daula. At that time, the Nawabi cavalry commander Raja Himmat Singh Gosai received the pargana of Amethi as a jagir, and he built a fort and market here, on the site of an abandoned Bhar village. After Shuja-ud-Daula was defeated in the Battle of Buxar in 1764, Himmat Singh Goshain denied him access to the fort, but after Nawabi control was restored, the raja decided that it would be prudent to leave Awadh, and he went back to his hometown of Haridwar where he received a small jagir.

By the turn of the 20th century, the fort of Gosainganj had fallen into ruin, and its moat had become overgrown with grasses and bushes. By that time, the town had been known as a prosperous commercial hub for a long time, with annual sales estimated to be around 40,000 rupees. However, Gosainganj's mercantile importance had been on a steady decline since the late 1800s due to rail transport attracting more and more commercial activity. Two major fairs were held in the city: one in honor of Devi Chaturbhuji during the month of Chait, and another on Dussehra, with each drawing crowds of about 5,000. The town had a police station (located just outside the town on the southeast), a post office, a large primary school, and a girls' school. It was held in taluqdari tenure by the Raja of Sissaindi.

Gosainganj formerly formed a separate pargana, which was split off from Amethi but then absorbed into the new pargana of Mohanlalganj in 1858.

== Demographics ==
As of 2011 India census, Gosainganj had a population of 9,649. Males constitute 51% of the population and females 49%. Gosainganj has an average literacy rate of 62%, more than the national average of 59.5%: male literacy is 64%, and female literacy is 60%. In Gosainganj, 15% of the population is under 6 years of age.

== Economy ==
Among the important industries in Gosainganj are rice, peppermint oil, and chikan garments. The town is also more known for its jewellery.

== Transport ==
=== Roads ===
- It is well connected by NH-56 in between Lucknow and Sultanpur. The distance from Gosainganj to Lucknow is around 20 km, Gosaiganj to Haidergarh around 32 km, Gosaiganj to Mohanlalaganj is 19 km and Gosaiganj to Sultanpur is around 115 km.
- The main Bus Stop from where connectivity to different parts of State is available is Alambagh Bus Stop and Kaiserbagh bus stand situated in Lucknow.
- Main transport here to reach Lucknow or to other city is Private Vehicle's like Tempo, Upnagriya City Buses (Lucknow - Gosaiganj - Haidergarh).

=== Railway ===
- Anupganj Railway Station is situated in Gosaiganj. The station is having few passenger trains connecting to Lucknow and Sultanpur.
- The main Railway Station to connect from here to state and country wise is Lucknow Charbagh railway station.

=== Air Transport ===
- The nearest Airport is Chaudhary Charan Singh International Airport situated in Lucknow.

=== Transport Issue to Notice ===
- Even after having great connectivity it is very bad in getting public transport to reach any near by destination like Lucknow in post evening time.

== Attraction ==
=== Mall ===
- Lulu Mall, Lucknow situated around 12 km from here.
- Phoenix palassio situated around 12 km from here.

=== Temple ===
- Mata Chaturbhji Temple is one of the most famous temple situated in Matan Tola area of Gosainganj.
- Sai Temple in Gumti Number 5 situated one side of NH-731 in Gumti Number 5 area of Gosaiganj.
- Bajarang bali 'Bada Mandir' Temple is Situated in main Town.
- Negula Beer Baba Temple is Situated in Check Post area (Qila) of Gosainganj.
- Siddheshwar Temple ( Shiv Mandir) including Mata Sheetla mandir and Shanidev mandir situated in between market behind Hanuman mandir.
- Narmadeshwar Temple is situated near railway crossing under a peepal tree.
- Shri Devadidev Mahadev temple near Sainik Dhaba. Highly auspicious and most revered.

== Villages ==
Gosainganj block comprises the following 116 villages:
