= Lucknow district =

Coordinates: 26°45′N 81°00′E

- District of Uttar Pradesh
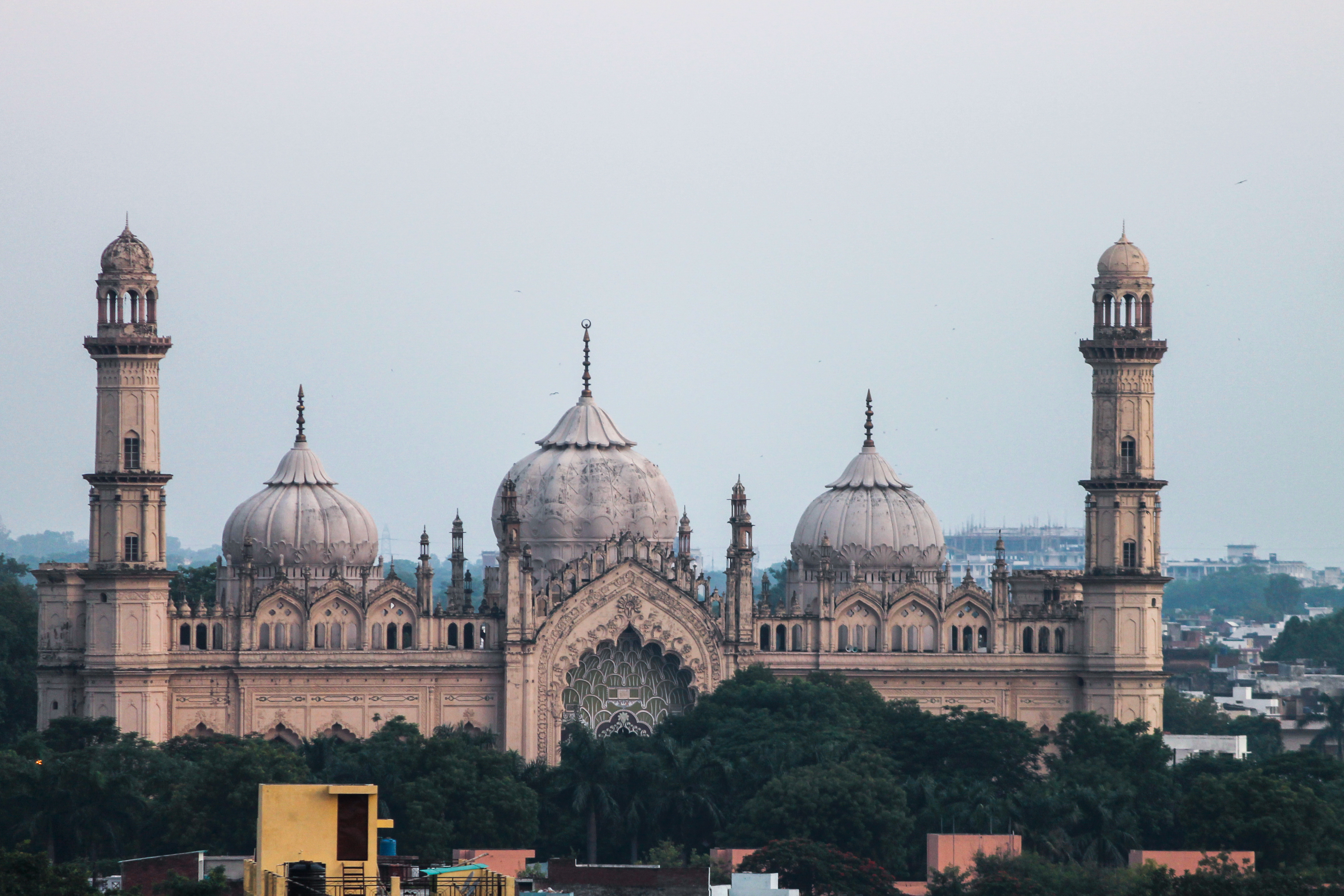
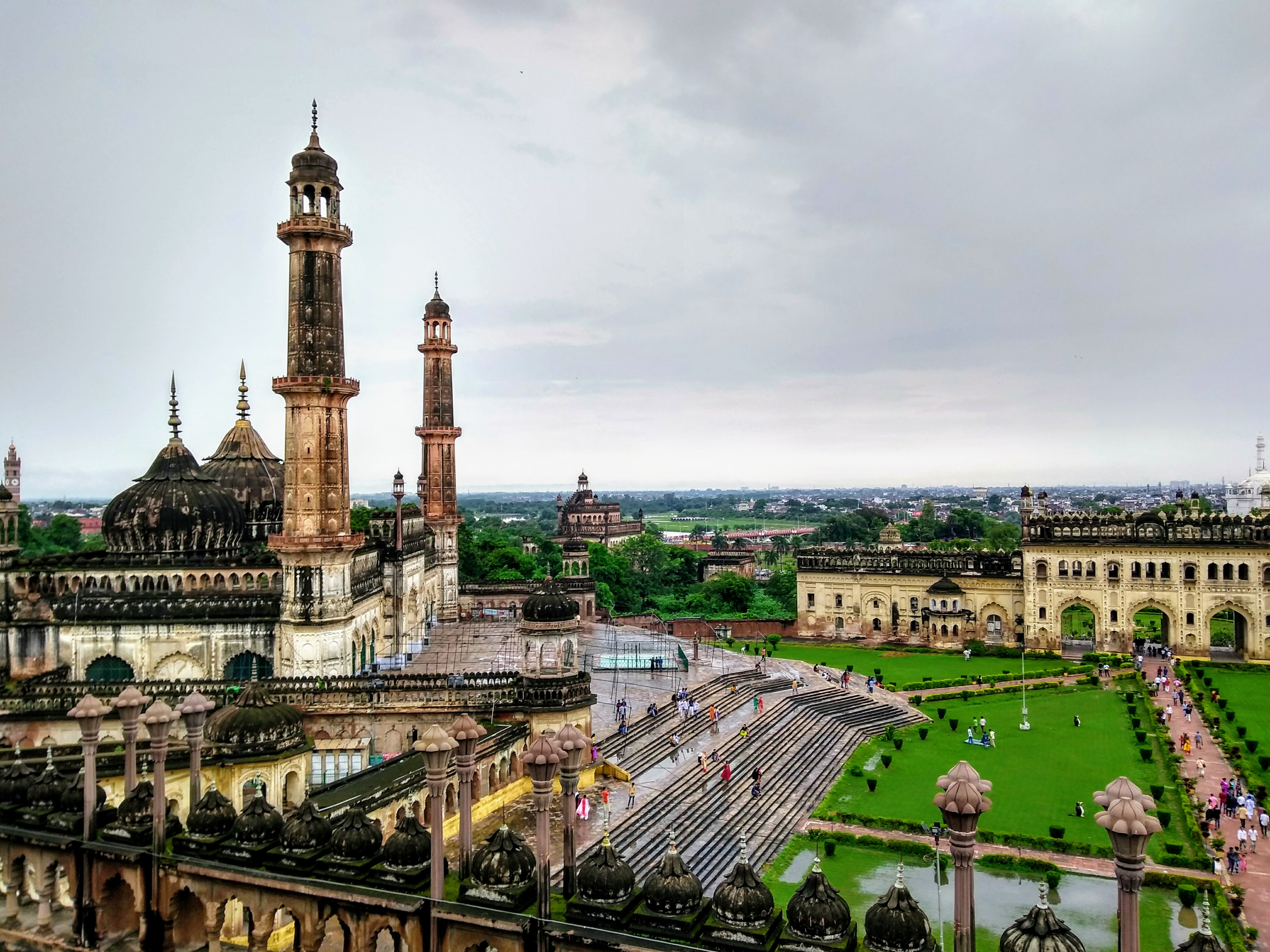
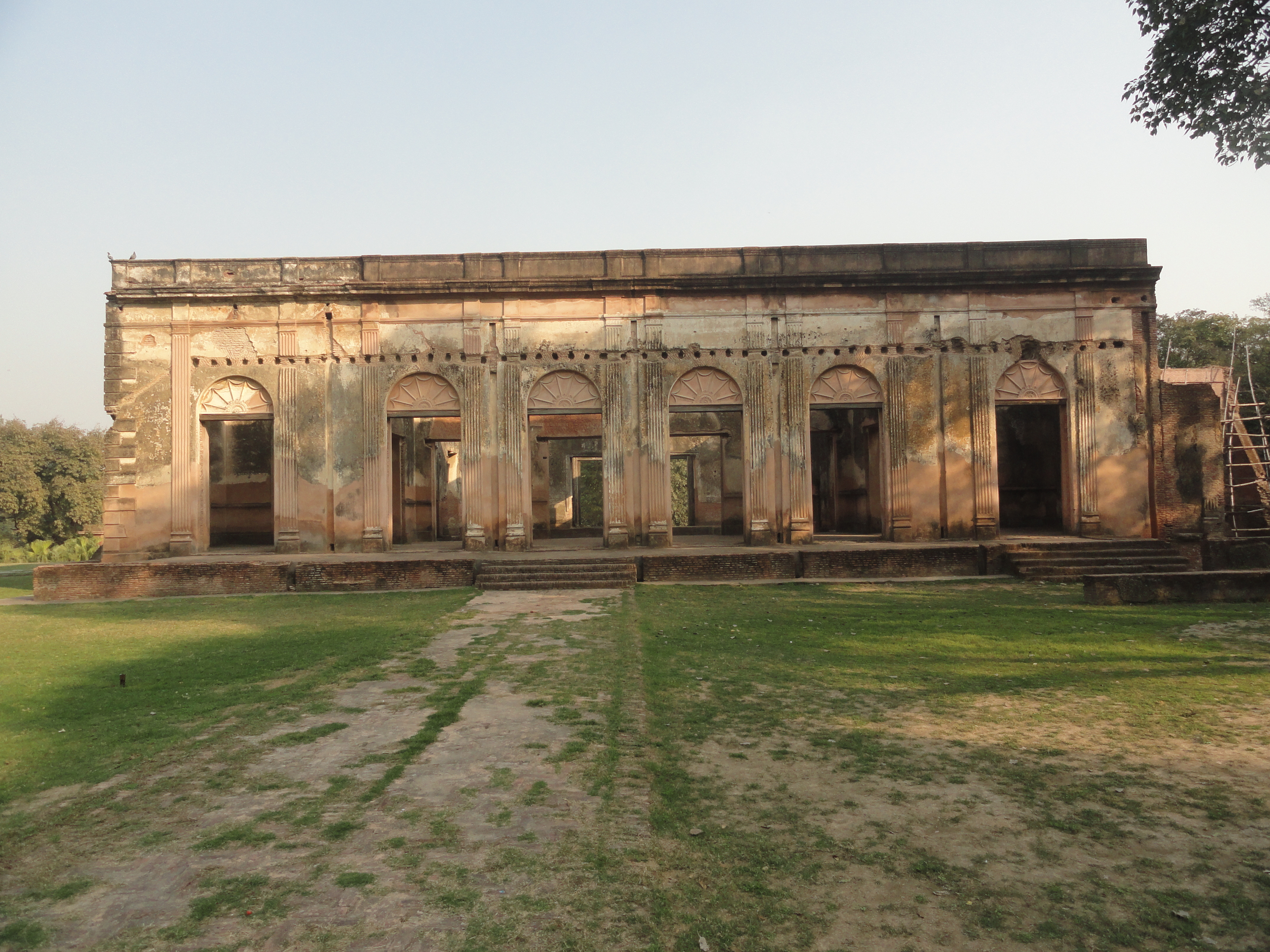
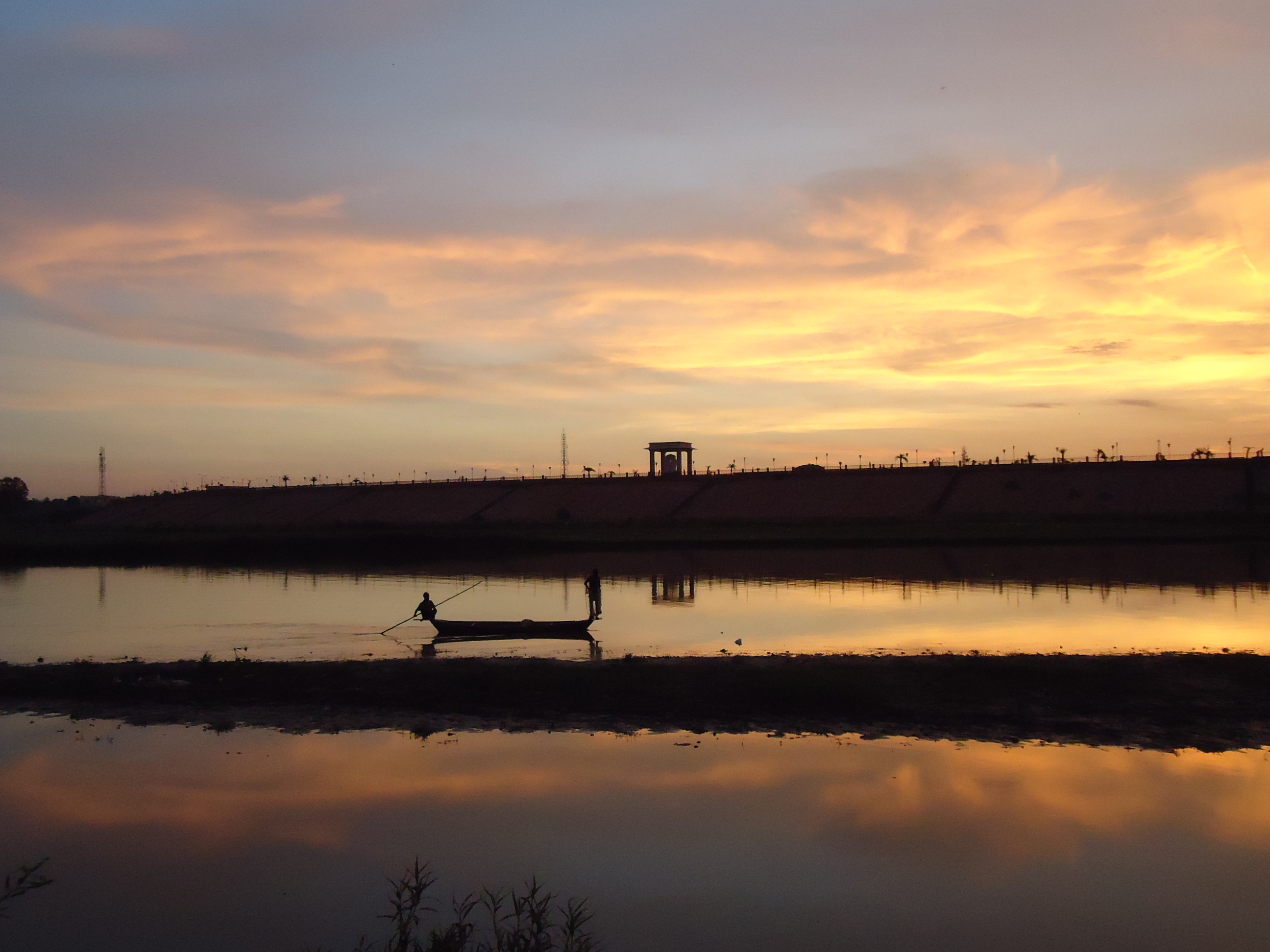
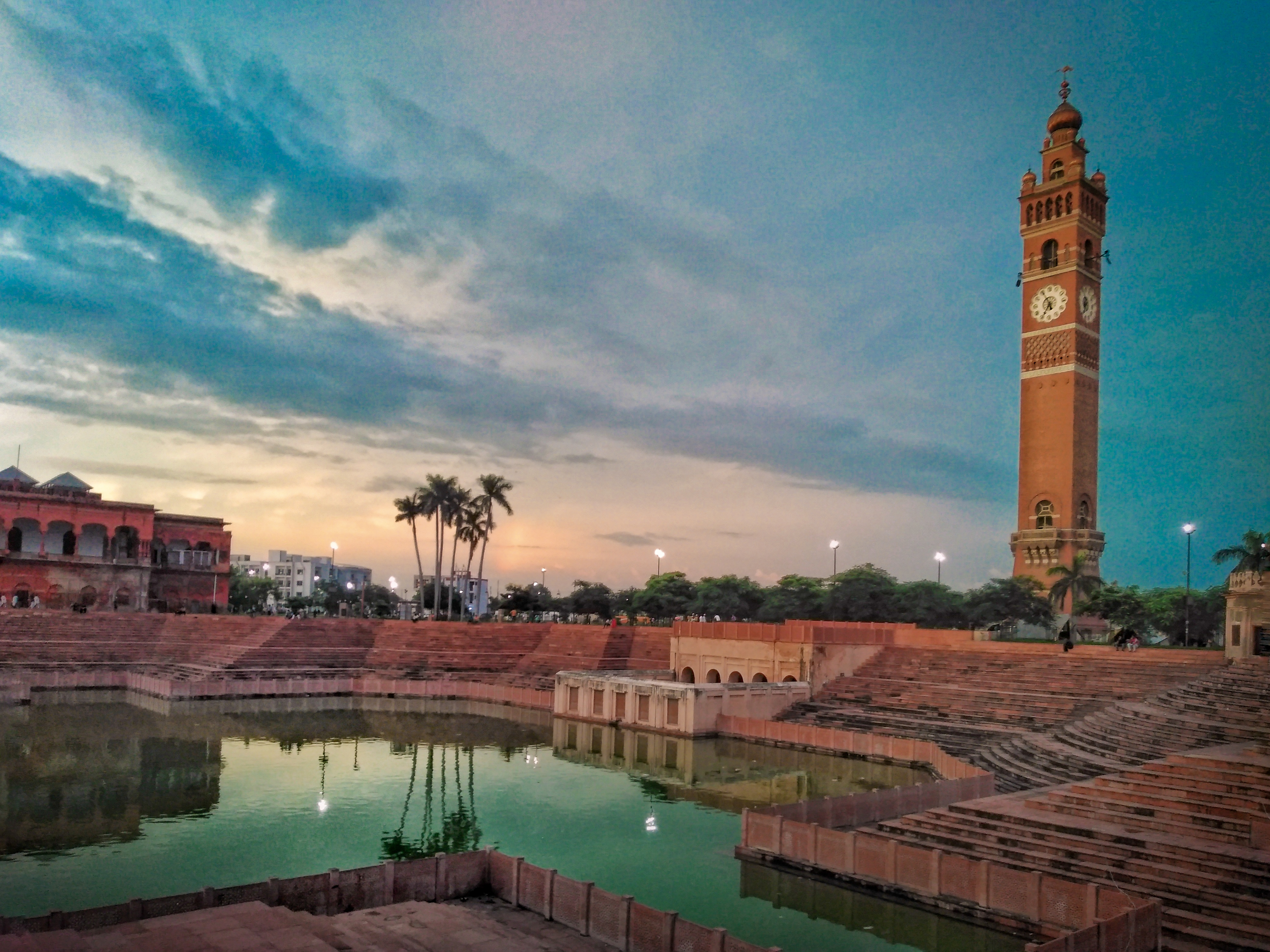
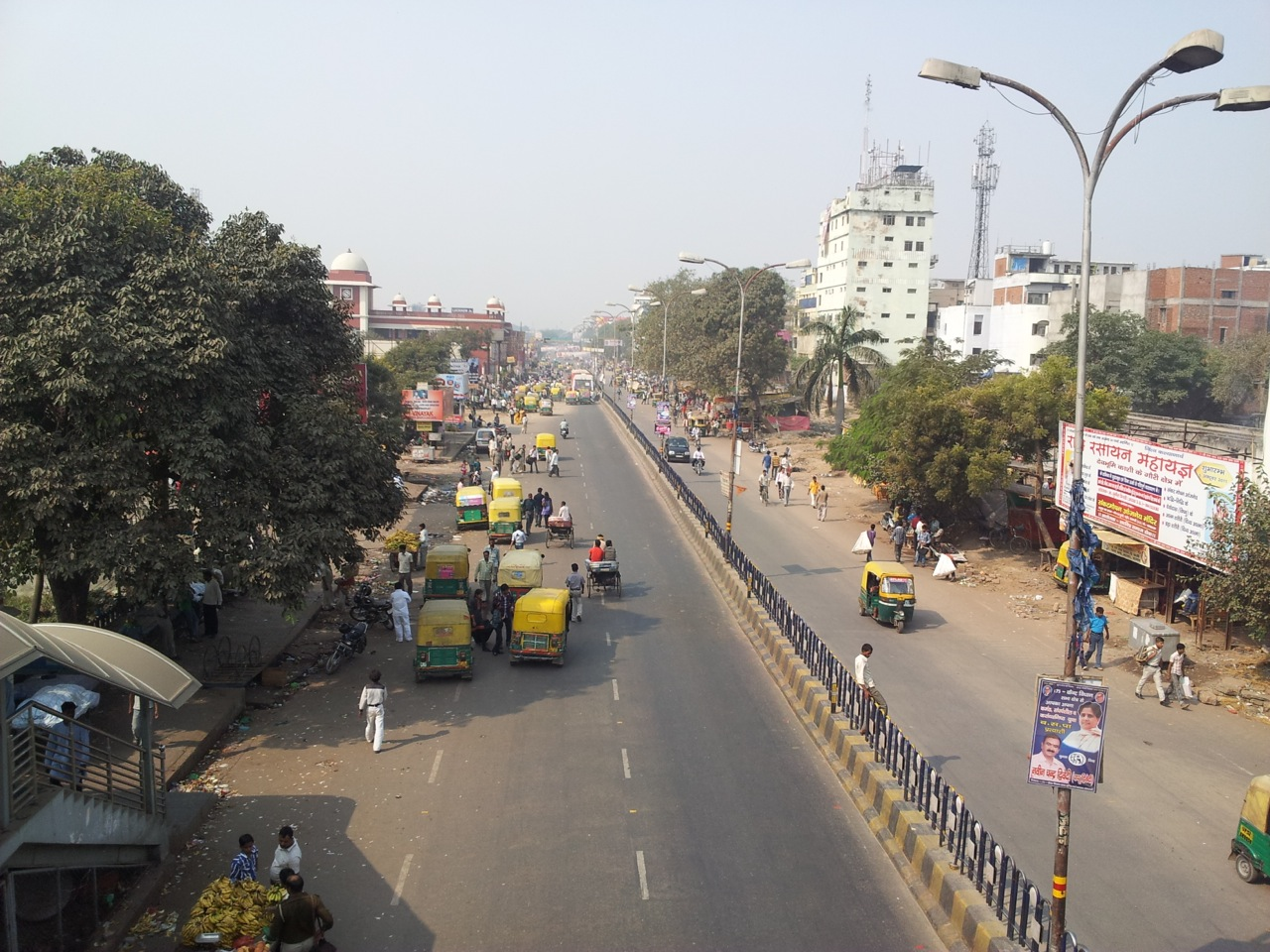
- Clockwise from top-left: Jama Masjid, Bara Imambara, Ruin of Lucknow Residency Hall, Husainabad Clock Tower, Outer roads of Lucknow City, Gomti River in Lucknow

- Location of Lucknow district in Uttar Pradesh
- Country: India
- State: Uttar Pradesh
- Division: Lucknow
- Established: 1856; 170 years ago
- Headquarters: Lucknow
- Tehsils: 1. Sadar; 2. Bakshi Ka Talab; 3. Malihabad; 4. Mohanlalganj; 5. Sarojini Nagar

Government
  - Body: Lucknow Municipal Corporation
  - Lok Sabha constituencies: Lucknow & Mohanlalganj
  - Mayor: Shushma Kharakwal (BJP)
  - District Magistrate: Vishak G (IAS)
  - DIG: Prabhakar Chaudhary (IPS)
  - MPs (Lok Sabha): Rajnath Singh (Lucknow); R. K. Chaudhary (Mohanlalganj)

Area
  - Total: 2,528 km^{2} (976 sq mi)

Population (2011)
  - Total: 4,589,838
  - Density: 1,816/km^{2} (4,702/sq mi)
  - Urban: 3,038,996

Demographics
  - Literacy: 82%
  - Sex ratio: 910 ♀/ 1000 ♂
- Time zone: UTC+05:30 (IST)
- Vehicle registration: UP-32
- Major Highways and Expressway: NE-6; NH-28; NH-27; NH-30; NH- 731; Agra–Lucknow Expressway; Purvanchal Expressway; Lucknow Outer Ring Road; Gomti Expressway; Lucknow Ghaziabad Expressway
- Website: lucknow.nic.in

Lucknow district is a district located in the state of Uttar Pradesh in northern India. The city of Lucknow is the district headquarters and the district is part of Lucknow division. It is also the capital city of Uttar Pradesh. Lucknow is bounded on the east by Barabanki district, on the west by Unnao and Hardoi districts, on the south by Raebareli district and in the north by Sitapur district.

== History ==
Located in what was historically known as the Awadh region, Lucknow has always been a multicultural place.

The Lucknow district that exists today was created by the British in 1856, upon their annexation of Oudh State. Under the Nawabs of Oudh, the area administered from Lucknow had been rather small, consisting of only the parganas immediately surrounding the city. This was known as the Huzur tehsil. The rest of the area had been part of other divisions whose headquarters lay outside the borders of the present-day district.

From 1856 until 1872, the new Lucknow district consisted of 10 parganas in 4 tehsils: Lucknow tehsil contained the 3 parganas of Lucknow, Bijnaur, and Kakori; Kursi tehsil contained the 3 parganas of Kursi, Dewa, and Mahona; Mohanlalganj tehsil contained the 2 parganas of Mohanlalganj and Nigohan; and Malihabad tehsil consisted of the 2 parganas of Malihabad and Auras-Mohan. In 1872, the first regular settlement conducted by the British was completed, and three parganas were transferred out of Lucknow district: Dewa and Kursi, the two easternmost parganas, were transferred to Barabanki district, while Auras-Mohan in the west was transferred to Unnao district. At the same time, the tehsils of Malihabad and Mahona were merged into a single entity.

== Geography and climate ==
Lucknow

Climate chart (precipitation, max. and min. temperature)
J	F	M	A	M	J	J	A	S	O	N	D
22 23 7	11 26 9	7.7 32 14	4.9 38 21	17 41 25	107 39 27	294 34 26	314 33 26	181 33 24	45 33 19	3.8 29 12	7.3 24 7
- █ Average max. and min. temperatures in °C
- █ Precipitation totals in mm
- Source: World Weather Information Service
Imperial conversion
J	F	M	A	M	J	J	A	S	O	N	D
0.9 73 44	0.4 79 49	0.3 90 58	0.2 101 69	0.6 105 76	4.2 102 81	12 92 79	12 91 78	7.1 91 76	1.8 91 66	0.1 84 53	0.3 75 45
- █ Average max. and min. temperatures in °F
- █ Precipitation totals in inches

Lucknow district covers an area of 2,528 square kilometers, centrally located in both the central Ganges plain as well as Uttar Pradesh as a whole. It consists of three geographical sub-regions: the Gomti basin, the Lucknow-Uparwar plain, and the upper Sai catchments. The landscape is very flat, with virtually no hills. There is a gradual slope from northwest to southeast, following the course of the rivers. Geologically, it is made of light alluvium and dun gravels of relatively recent age. Scattered throughout the district are the nodular limestone deposits called kankar, which appear in beds of varying thickness located 2–5 feet below the surface.

The area was once lightly wooded, but by the turn of the 20th century most of this had been cut down. Large dhak forests covered parts of the old parganas of Malihabad, Mahona, and Mohanlalganj until the late 1800s, when they were cleared to make space for farms. By the early 1900s, the only large area of dhak forest that remained was in the northeastern corner of Mahona pargana. In 2008–09, it was recorded that 13,082 hectares of Lucknow district were under forest cover, representing 5.19% of the total land area. Of note is the Kukrail forest reserve, on the outskirts of the Lucknow metro area.

The main rivers of Lucknow district are the Gomti and the Sai. The Gomti enters the district at the meeting of the borders with Hardoi and Sitapur districts, and then winds its way through Lucknow district. The riverbed of the Gomti is significantly lower than the surrounding area, limiting its use for irrigation. In many places, the high banks of the Gomti are scarred with ravines, where rainfall has gradually eroded away the earth that used to be there. The main tributary of the Gomti is the Behta, a perennial stream which originates in Hardoi district and joins the Gomti near the village of Kankarabad. The other tributaries include the Loni and the nalas of Jhingi and Akraddi, as well as the Kukrail on the left bank. The Sai enters Lucknow district at the village of Sulsa Mau and flows toward the southeast, forming the border with Unnao district until it turns south at the village of Agahiya. The Sai's banks are shallower and less eroded than those of the Gomti. The main tributary of the Sai is the Bakh, which originates as a chain of jhils in a depression near Bijnaur.

There are also barren usar tracts, where there is little plant growth except for some small grasses that grow during the rainy season. They are often formed from soil saturation. They are most common in the southern and western parts of the district.

The climate of Lucknow district is predominantly subtropical in nature, and it experiences the effects of the South Asian monsoon. There are three main seasons: the summer season typically lasts from March to June, with May and June being the hottest months; then comes the rainy season, from July to October. The heaviest rains are during July and August. Then comes winter, which lasts from November until February. January is generally the coldest month. However, the Lucknow area has a fairly moderate climate, and does not experience particularly extreme temperatures. Frost sometimes happens here in cold weather, but it is rare.

== Appointed Officers ==
District Magistrate of Lucknow
- Emblem of India
- Incumbent; Shri Surya Pal Gangawar (IAS) since 2022
- Residence: DM Residence, near Lalbagh, Lucknow
- Appointer: Government of Uttar Pradesh
- Term length: No Time Limit

Appointed Officers		Services	Posted Since	Duration
Commissioner of Police	Amrendra Kumar Sengar	Indian Police Services (IPS)	23 June 2024	2 years, 95 days
Divisional Commissioner	Roshan Jacob	Indian Administrative Services (IAS)	26 June 2022	4 years, 92 days
District Magistrate	Surya Pal Gangawar	Indian Administrative Services (IAS)	8 June 2022	4 years, 110 days
Vice Chairman, Lucknow Development Authority	Dr. Indramani Tripathi	Indian Administrative Services (IAS)	22 June 2022	4 years, 96 days
Municipal Commissioner	Indrajeet Singh	Indian Administrative Services (IAS)	26 June 2022	4 years, 92 days

== Divisions ==
Lucknow district is divided into 5 tehsils: Lucknow, Malihabad, Mohanlalganj, Bakshi Ka Talab and Sarojini Nagar. These tehsils are then divided into 8 community development blocks (vikas khand), as follows:

- Bakshi Ka Talab tehsil
  - Bakshi Ka Talab
- Lucknow tehsil
  - Chinhat (Note: Most of Chinhat block is in Lucknow tehsil, but a small part belongs to Bakshi Ka Talab tehsil instead.)
  - Kakori
  - Sarojani Nagar
- Malihabad tehsil
  - Mal
  - Malihabad
- Mohanlalganj tehsil
  - Gosainganj
  - Mohanlalganj

Lucknow district contains 807 villages and 498 gram panchayats.

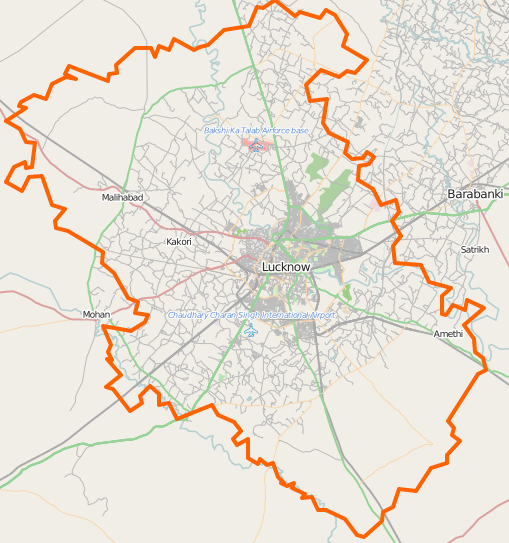
Map showing Lucknow District

=== Villages ===
- Bakkas
- Mahurakala
- Mastemoo
- Bhedhahan khera

=== Politics ===
==== Parliamentary Constituencies ====
Lok Sabha Constituencies
PC. No	Constituency	Political Party	Elected Representative	Election
34	Lucknow	BJP	Rajnath Singh (Union Defence Minister)	2024 Indian General Election
35	Mohanlalganj (SC)	SP	R. K. Chaudhary	2024 Indian General Election

==== Legislative Assembly Constituencies ====
Vidhan Sabha Constituencies
AC NO.	Constituency	Lok Sabha Constituency	Political Party	Elected Representative	Election
168	Malihabad (SC)	Mohanlalganj	BJP	Jai Devi	2022 Uttar Pradesh Legislative Assembly Election
169	Bakshi Ka Talab	Mohanlalganj	BJP	Yogesh Shukla	2022 Uttar Pradesh Legislative Assembly Election
170	Sarojini Nagar	Mohanlalganj	BJP	Rajeshwar Singh	2022 Uttar Pradesh Legislative Assembly Election
171	Lucknow West	Lucknow	SP	Armaan Khan	2022 Uttar Pradesh Legislative Assembly Election
172	Lucknow North	Lucknow	BJP	Neeraj Bora	2022 Uttar Pradesh Legislative Assembly Election
173	Lucknow East	Lucknow	BJP	O. P. Srivastava	2024 Uttar Pradesh Legislative Assembly Bye Election
174	Lucknow Central	Lucknow	SP	Ravidas Mehrotra	2022 Uttar Pradesh Legislative Assembly Election
175	Lucknow Cantonment	Lucknow	BJP	Brajesh Pathak (Deputy Chief Minister)	2022 Uttar Pradesh Legislative Assembly Election
176	Mohanlalganj (SC)	Mohanlalganj	BJP	Amresh Kumar	2022 Uttar Pradesh Legislative Assembly Election

== Demography ==
Historical population
Year	Pop.	±% p.a.
1901	793,241	—
1911	764,411	−0.37%
1921	724,344	−0.54%
1931	787,472	+0.84%
1941	949,728	+1.89%
1951	1,128,101	+1.74%
1961	1,338,882	+1.73%
1971	1,617,846	+1.91%
1981	2,014,574	+2.22%
1991	2,762,801	+3.21%
2001	3,647,834	+2.82%
2011	4,589,838	+2.32%

According to the 2011 census Lucknow district has a population of 4,589,838, roughly equal to the nation of Georgia or the US state of Louisiana. This gives it a ranking of 31st in India (out of a total of 640). The district has a population density of 1,815 inhabitants per square kilometre (4,700/sq mi). Its population growth rate over the decade 2001-2011 was 25.79%. Lucknow has a sex ratio of 906 females for every 1000 males, and a literacy rate of 79.33%. 66.21% of the population lived in urban areas. Scheduled Castes made up 20.66% of the population.

According to the 2001 census Lucknow district had a population of 3,681,461.

''Muskuraiye Aap Lucknow Main Hai''

=== Religion ===
Religions in Lucknow district (2011)
Religion	Percent
Hinduism	77.08%
Islam	21.46%
Sikhism	0.52%
Christianity	0.45%
Other or not stated	0.49%

There is harmony between people of different religions in the city of Lucknow. The Lucknow Pact between the Indian National Congress and the Muslim League was agreed upon at the joint session of both parties in 1915. Religious institutions include Sankat Mochan Hanuman Temple, Sri Ramakrishna Math and Chandrika Devi Temple.

=== Languages ===
Languages of Lucknow district (2011)
1. Hindi (89.2%)
2. Urdu (7.56%)
3. Awadhi (1.56%)
4. Others (1.73%)

At the time of the 2011 Census of India, 89.15% of the population in the district reported Hindi, 7.56% Urdu and 1.56% Awadhi as their first language.

Languages spoken here include Awadhi, a vernacular in the Hindi continuum spoken by over 38 million people, mainly in the Awadh region. Hindi and Urdu are also the two mainstream languages of the district. Lucknow city is also home to speakers of languages throughout India.

== Agriculture ==
There are three harvests, called by the typical Hindustani names of rabi, kharif, and zaid. Rabi is the springtime harvest, Kharif is the autumn harvest, and Zaid is the hot-weather harvest. The most important of the three harvests is kharif, which historically has always involved larger areas of cultivation than Rabi. Of the kharif crops, the most important was traditionally rice, grown in two kinds: early rice, harvested in July and not grown very extensively, and late or transplanted rice, harvested in October and November and far more extensively grown, especially in areas with heavier clayey soils. The second most important kharif crop was historically juwar, grown in loamier soils, usually mixed with arhar, and often used as fodder. Bajra (pearl millet) has also traditionally been grown extensively, particularly in areas with sandier soil. Today, the main kharif crops in Lucknow district are rice, maize, juwar, bajra, urad, mung beans, and soybeans. As for the rabi crops, the most important are wheat and barley, followed by gram, peas, arhar, and oilseeds. In the early 20th century, peas and barley were not as widely grown. There are only a few zaid crops, of which the most important in Lucknow district has historically been the melon; the melons grown here have been renowned for their taste.

Most famous among Lucknow district's produce is the Dasheri mango, which are especially grown in the areas around Kakori and Malihabad. The Dasheri is said to have originated during the 18th century, as a chance seedling in the Nawab's gardens. Since then, the Dasheri has been spread throughout North India through continuous grafting.
