= Ain (given name) =

Estonian male given name

- Gender: Male
- Language: Estonian

Origin
- Region of origin: Estonia

Ain is a common Estonian-language male given name.

People named Ain include:

- Ain Andressoo (1935–2023), Estonian archer and architect
- Ain Anger (born 1971), Estonian opera bass
- Ain Evard (born 1962), Soviet/Estonian high jumper
- Ain-Alar Juhanson (born 1976), Estonian triathlete
- Ain Kaalep (1926–2020), Estonian poet, playwright, literary critic and translator
- Ain-Elmar Kaasik (1934–2026), Estonian neurologist, neurosurgeon and professor
- Ain Kalmus (1906–2001), Estonian writer and theologian
- Ain Lutsepp (born 1954), Estonian actor and politician
- Ain Mäeots (born 1971), Estonian actor and director
- Ain Mäesalu (born 1955), Estonian archeologist
- Ain Matvere (1967–2018), Estonian badminton player
- Ain-Ervin Mere (1903–1969), Estonian military officer
- Ain Padrik (born 1947), Estonian architect
- Ain Prosa (born 1967), Estonian director and actor
- Ain Roost (born 1946), Canadian discus thrower of Estonian origin
- Ain Saar (born 1968), Estonian freedom fighter
- Ain Saarmann (born 1939), Estonian politician
- Ain Seppik (born 1952), Estonian politician
- Ain Sillak (Alfred Schmidt, 1898–1972), Estonian weightlifter
- Ain Tammus (born 1969), Estonian footballer and coach
- Ain Vilde (born 1942). Estonian ice yachter and sport sailor
