= Ain (disambiguation) =

Ain is a département of France.

Ain or AIN may also refer to:

== Language ==
- Ain (letter) or ʿayin, a letter in Semitic scripts such as Arabic and Hebrew
- Ainu language (ISO-639 alpha-3 code AIN)

== Medical ==
- Anal intraepithelial neoplasia, a precursor to anal cancer
- Anterior interosseous nerve serving the forearm
- Acute interstitial nephritis, nephritis affecting the interstitium of the kidneys

== People ==
- Ain (given name), a common Estonian masculine given name
- Ain (surname)
- Ain (mythology), an Irish mythological figure

== Places ==
- Ain (Bible), a biblical city
- ‘Ain Dawwah, one of the springs of Wadi Bani Khalid, Oman
- Ain (river), a river in eastern France
- Al Ain, a city in the United Arab Emirates
- Ain, Iran, a village in Qazvin Province, Iran
- Aín, a town in eastern Spain
- Ain, Lucknow, a village in Uttar Pradesh, India
- El Ain (disambiguation), several places

== Culture ==
- Ain (film), a Malayalam-language Indian film
- Autonomous Individuals Network, formerly known as Thee Temple ov Psychick Youth

== Sports ==
- Al Ain Club, a football club in the United Arab Emirates
- Individual Neutral Athletes, IOC country code AIN, after the French name Athlètes Individuels Neutres
  - Individual Neutral Athletes at the 2024 Summer Olympics
  - Individual Neutral Athletes at the 2026 Winter Olympics

== Business ==
- Albany International, an American industrial goods company whose stock trades under the AIN ticker symbol
- Advanced Intelligent Network in mobile telecoms
- Aviation International News, an aviation media
- American Independent Network, a TV network
- Aintree railway station, Liverpool, England (code: AIN)
- Advanced Intelligent Network (AIN) – Variant of Intelligent Network, telecommunications network architecture

== Science ==
- Epsilon Tauri or Ain, an orange giant star

== See also ==
- Ain Soph
- Ayn (disambiguation)
- Ayin (disambiguation)
- Al Ain (disambiguation)
- El Ain (disambiguation)
