= Ovan Lake =

Lake in Iran

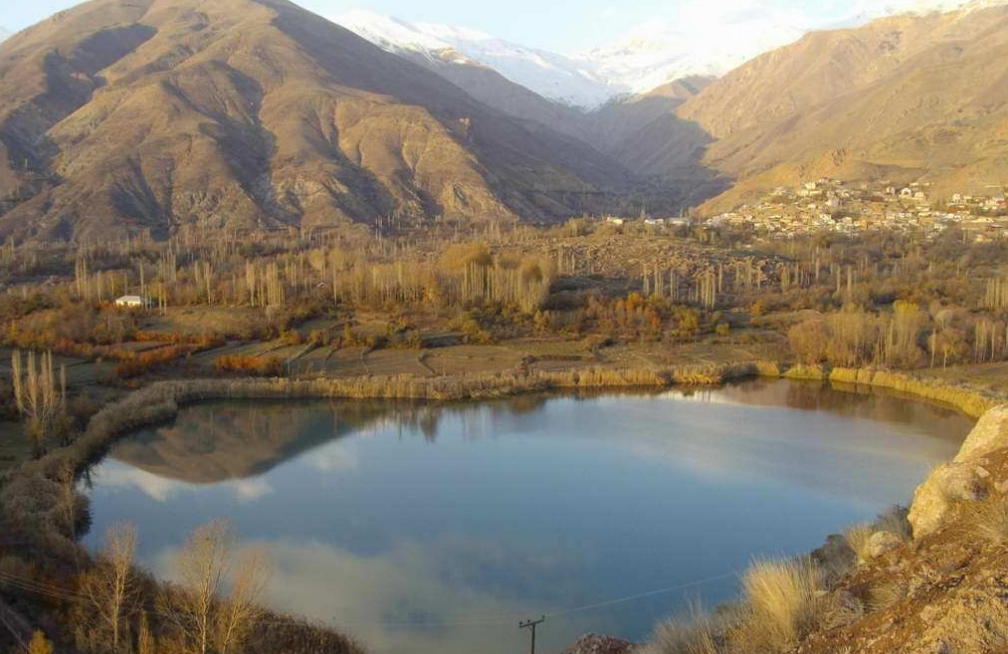
- Ovan Lake and surrounding mountains

- Location within Iran
- Interactive map of Ovan Lake
- Location: Alamut
- Coordinates: 36°28′58″N 50°26′37″E
- Primary inflows: Ovan stream and the springs underneath of the lake
- Primary outflows: A stream to farmlands
- Basin countries: Iran
- Surface area: 70,000 m^{2} (17 acres)
- Max. depth: 7.5 m (25 ft)
- Surface elevation: 1,800 m (5,900 ft)

Ovan lake (also known as Evan Lake or Avan Lake) (Persian: اوان) is a small alpine lake in the Alamut region of the Alborz mountain range, in Qazvin province in northwestern Iran. The centre point of the lake is approximately located at 36°28′58.98″N 50°26′37.39″E. The only tributary that flows into the lake, is a stream with the same name, Ovan, coming down from northern mounts. The north of the lake is surrounded by three small villages, namely from east to west: Varbon, Avan and Zarabad.

== Hydrology ==
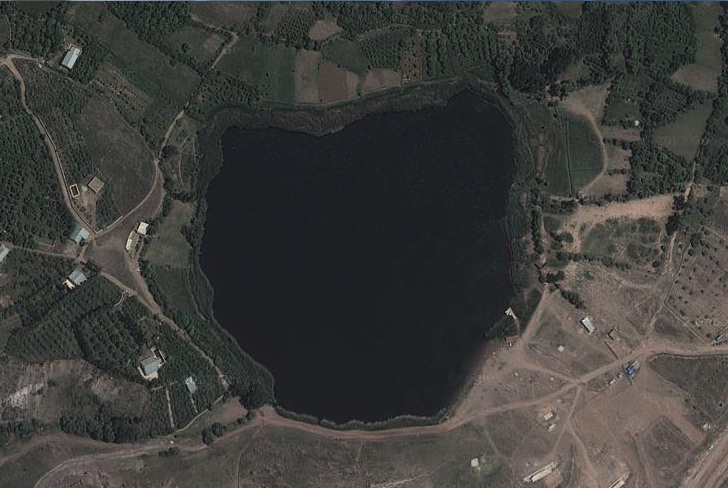
Ovan Lake by Landsat

Because of the heavy seasonal rainfall and snowfall in the winters, which at times reaches a few meters, it has numerous water resources. Surrounded by Avan, Varbon, Zavardasht and Zarabad villages, the lake is located in an altitude of 1800 meters above sea level, its maximum length is 325 meters, and it has a width of 275 meters. The deepest section of the lake is 7.5 meters and extends over 70,000 square meters. The excess water of the lake which forms a small river which irrigates farmlands in the villages of Kushk and Ain.

Ovan Lake is suitable for fishing, swimming and riding boats in summer while in fall it hosts migratory birds such as swan, goose and duck. In winter, the lake can be used for sports such as skiing and ice skating while its surface becomes slippery with ice in winter.

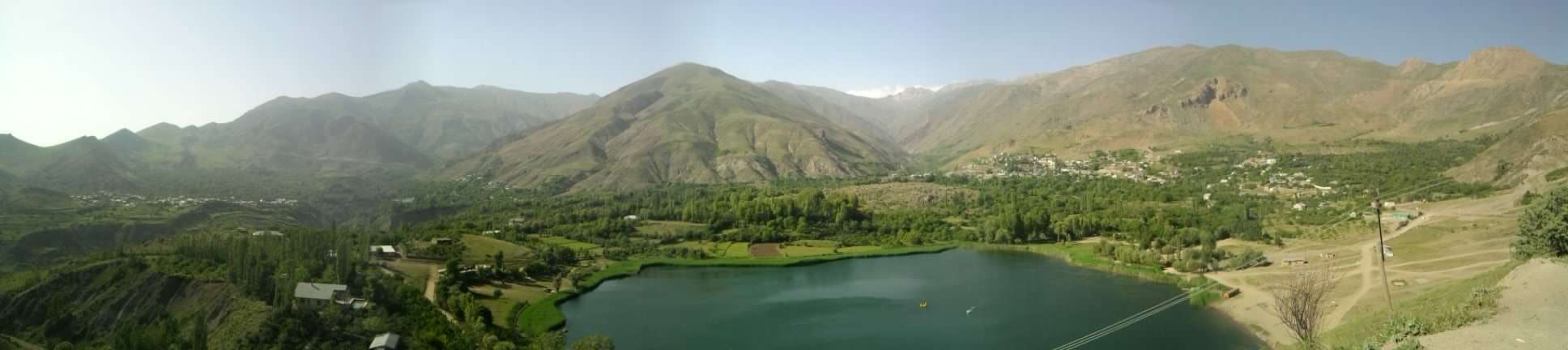

== Ecology ==
Having covered an area of 70 thousand square meters, Ovan Lake is the largest in Qazvin province. There in the lake also live fishes like salmon, carp, and pike in addition to plants like everglade and reed that grow in its vicinity. Thanks to these beauties and natural potentials, Ovan Lake is recorded as one of the most significant tourist poles in Qazvin province and is frequented by many visitors from around the country and all over the world during the whole year especially on holidays and in summer. The fact that it is being visited by tourists and travelers has helped locals economically in various ways.

== Access to the lake ==
The lake can be reached via a road which connects Qazvin to East Alamut.
