= Kalmus =

Kalmus is a surname. Notable people with the surname include:

- Ain Kalmus (1906–2001), Estonian writer and theologian
- Alfred Kalmus (1889-1972), Austrian-British music publisher
- Edwin F. Kalmus (1893-1989), American music publisher
- George Kalmus (born 1935), British particle physicist
- Herbert Kalmus (1881-1963), American scientist and engineer
- Marion Kalmus, British artist
- Natalie Kalmus (1882-1965), American Technicolor color supervisor
- Peter Kalmus (artist) (born 1953), Slovak artist and activist
- Peter Kalmus (climate scientist) (born 1974), American climate scientist
- Peter Kalmus (physicist) (born 1933), British particle physicist
