= Varbon =

Varbon (Persian: وربن) may refer to:

- Varbon, Gilan
- Varbon, Qazvin
