= Zavarak =

Zavarak (Persian: زوارك) may refer to:

- Zavarak, Amol, Mazandaran Province
- Zavarak, Babol, Mazandaran Province
- Zavarak, Qazvin
