= Zarabad, Qazvin =

Village in Qazvin province, Iran

Zarabad Persian: زراباد
- Village
- Location within Iran
- Coordinates: 36°29′15″N 50°25′50″E
- Country: Iran
- Province: Qazvin
- County: Qazvin
- District: Rudbar-e Alamut-e Sharqi
- Rural District: Moallem Kalayeh

Population (2016)
  - Total: 895
- Time zone: UTC+3:30 (IRST)

Zarabad (Persian: زراباد) (Note: Also romanized as Zarābād) is a village in Moallem Kalayeh Rural District of Rudbar-e Alamut-e Sharqi District (Note: Formerly Rudbar-e Alamut District) in Qazvin County, Qazvin province, Iran. Zarabad is located on Ovan Lake.

== Demographics ==
=== Population ===
At the time of the 2006 National Census, the village's population was 342 in 129 households. The following census in 2011 counted 322 people in 135 households. The 2016 census measured the population of the village as 895 people in 334 households. It was the most populous village in its rural district.
