= Bukan, Qazvin =

Bukan بوكان
- Village
- Location within Iran
- Coordinates: 36°24′10″N 50°33′54″E
- Country: Iran
- Province: Qazvin
- County: Qazvin
- Bakhsh: Rudbar-e Alamut
- Rural District: Alamut-e Bala

Population (2006)
  - Total: 151
- Time zone: UTC+3:30 (IRST)
  - Summer (DST): UTC+4:30 (IRDT)

Bukan (Persian: بوكان, also Romanized as Būḵān) is a village in Alamut-e Bala Rural District, Rudbar-e Alamut District, Qazvin County, Qazvin Province, Iran. At the 2006 census, its population was 151, in 43 families.
