= Ayin (disambiguation) =

Ayin or ʿayin is a letter of Semitic abjads, including Phoenician 𐤏, Aramaic 𐡏, Hebrew ע, and Arabic ع.

Ayin may also refer to:

- Ayin (Kabbalah), the concept of nothingness in Kabbalah
- Âyin, an Ottoman satirical magazine published between 1921 and 1922
- Əyin, a village in Azerbaijan
- ع, an abbreviation meaning "Arabic"

== See also ==
- Ain (disambiguation)
- Ayn (disambiguation)
