= Garmarud =

Village in Qazvin province, Iran

Garmarud Persian: گرمارود
- Village
- Location within Iran
- Coordinates: 36°22′52″N 50°43′40″E
- Country: Iran
- Province: Qazvin
- County: Qazvin
- District: Rudbar-e Alamut-e Sharqi
- Rural District: Alamut-e Pain

Population (2016)
  - Total: 232
- Time zone: UTC+3:30 (IRST)

Garmarud (Persian: گرمارود) (Note: Also romanized as Garmārūd) is a village in Alamut-e Pain Rural District of Rudbar-e Alamut-e Sharqi District (Note: Formerly Rudbar-e Alamut District) in Qazvin County, Qazvin province, Iran.

In The Valley of the Assassins, Garmarud is mentioned by British traveller and explorer Freya Stark as a place she visits during one of her Persian tours in the 1930s. She describes the immediate region in some detail.

== Demographics ==
=== Population ===
At the time of the 2006 National Census, the village's population was 300 in 111 households. The following census in 2011 counted 244 people in 89 households. The 2016 census measured the population of the village as 232 people in 106 households.
