= Mäesalu =

Mäesalu is a surname. Notable people with the surname include:

- Ain Mäesalu (born 1955), Estonian archeologist
- Innar Mäesalu (born 1970), Estonian politician
