= Badasht =

Badasht may refer to:

- Badasht, Qazvin
- Badasht, Semnan
- Conference of Badasht, a meeting of leading Bábís in 1848
