= Ruch-e Olya =

Village in Qazvin province, Iran

Ruch-e Olya Persian: روچ عليا
- Village
- Location within Iran
- Coordinates: 36°22′46″N 50°40′12″E
- Country: Iran
- Province: Qazvin
- County: Qazvin
- District: Rudbar-e Alamut-e Sharqi
- Rural District: Alamut-e Pain

Population (2016)
  - Total: 197
- Time zone: UTC+3:30 (IRST)

Ruch-e Olya (Persian: روچ عليا) (Note: Also romanized as Rūch-e ‘Olyā; also known as Bala Ruch (بالاروج)) is a village in Alamut-e Pain Rural District of Rudbar-e Alamut-e Sharqi District (Note: Formerly Rudbar-e Alamut District) in Qazvin County, Qazvin province, Iran.

== Demographics ==
=== Population ===
At the time of the 2006 National Census, the village's population was 118 in 57 households. The following census in 2011 counted 109 people in 50 households. The 2016 census measured the population of the village as 197 people in 83 households.
