= Peter Kalmus =

Peter Kalmus may refer to:

- Peter Kalmus (physicist), British particle physicist, born 1933
- Peter Kalmus (artist), Slovak artist and activist, born 1953
- Peter Kalmus (climate scientist), American academic, born 1974
