= Ruch-e Sofla, Qazvin =

Village in Qazvin province, Iran

Ruch-e Sofla Persian: روچ سفلی
- Village
- Location within Iran
- Coordinates: 36°22′43″N 50°38′45″E
- Country: Iran
- Province: Qazvin
- County: Qazvin
- District: Rudbar-e Alamut-e Sharqi
- Rural District: Alamut-e Pain

Population (2016)
  - Total: 173
- Time zone: UTC+3:30 (IRST)

Ruch-e Sofla (Persian: روچ سفلی) (Note: Also romanized as Rūch-e Soflá; also known as Pain Ruch (پایین روج)) is a village in Alamut-e Pain Rural District of Rudbar-e Alamut-e Sharqi District (Note: Formerly Rudbar-e Alamut District) in Qazvin County, Qazvin province, Iran.

== Demographics ==
=== Population ===
At the time of the 2006 National Census, the village's population was 78 in 33 households. The following census in 2011 counted 45 people in 26 households. The 2016 census measured the population of the village as 173 people in 65 households.
