= Masoudabad, Qazvin =

Village in Qazvin province, Iran

Masoudabad Persian: مسعودآباد
- Village
- Location within Iran
- Coordinates: 36°26′25″N 50°34′47″E
- Country: Iran
- Province: Qazvin
- County: Qazvin
- District: Rudbar-e Alamut-e Sharqi
- Rural District: Alamut-e Bala

Population (2016)
  - Total: 517
- Time zone: UTC+3:30 (IRST)

Masoudabad (Persian: مسعودآباد) (Note: Also romanized as Mas‘ūdābād; formerly known as Kazar Khan (کازرخان)) is a village in Alamut-e Bala Rural District of Rudbar-e Alamut-e Sharqi District (Note: Formerly Rudbar-e Alamut District) in Qazvin County, Qazvin province, Iran.

== Demographics ==
=== Population ===
At the time of the 2006 National Census, the village's population was 690 in 211 households. The following census in 2011 counted 545 people in 221 households. The 2016 census measured the population of the village as 517 people in 207 households.
