= Vanash =

Vanash (Persian: وناش) may refer to:

- Vanash-e Bala
- Vanash-e Pain
