= Anwan =

Anwan may refer to:

- Anwan, Iran, a village in Qazvin Province
- Anwan Glover, American actor and musician
