= Bhatgaon, Lucknow =

Village in Uttar Pradesh, India

Bhatgaon Bhatgāon
- Village
- Location in Uttar Pradesh, India Bhatgaon (India)
- Coordinates: 26.705365°N 80.780385°E
- Country: India
- State: Uttar Pradesh
- District: Lucknow

Area
  - Total: 9.813 km^{2} (3.789 sq mi)

Population (2011)
  - Total: 7,131
  - Density: 726.7/km^{2} (1,882/sq mi)

Languages
  - Official: Hindi
- Time zone: UTC+5:30 (IST)

Bhatgaon is a village in Sarojaninagar block of Lucknow district, Uttar Pradesh, India. As of 2011, its population was 7,131, in 1,353 households. A regular market is held here. The village lands cover an area of 981.3 hectares, of which 681.9 (69.4%) were farmland in 2011. Areas under non-agricultural use covered 67.5 hectares, or 6.9% of the total village area.

== History ==
Around the turn of the 20th century, Bhatgaon was described as a "very large village in the south-west of the pargana" of Bijnaur, held by a Sheikh family in pattidari tenure. It was surrounded by tanks, which formed the main source of irrigation. The soil was described as "a light loam with a tendency to sand", and the main crops grown here were bajra, barley, and rice. The 1901 census recorded a population of 2,105 people, of whom 294 were Muslim; the main Hindu group was the Kachhis. There was a small school, which had been established in 1864.
