= Andaj =

Village in Qazvin province, Iran

Andaj Persian: اندج
- Village
- Location within Iran
- Coordinates: 36°28′07″N 50°31′40″E
- Country: Iran
- Province: Qazvin
- County: Qazvin
- District: Rudbar-e Alamut-e Sharqi
- Rural District: Alamut-e Bala

Population (2016)
  - Total: 229
- Time zone: UTC+3:30 (IRST)

Andaj (Persian: اندج) (Note: Also romanized as Andej) is a village in Alamut-e Bala Rural District of Rudbar-e Alamut-e Sharqi District (Note: Formerly Rudbar-e Alamut District) in Qazvin County, Qazvin province, Iran.

== Demographics ==
=== Population ===
At the time of the 2006 National Census, the village's population was 179 in 61 households. The following census in 2011 counted 110 people in 38 households. The 2016 census measured the population of the village as 229 people in 84 households.
