= Banthra Sikandarpur =

Village in Uttar Pradesh, India

Banthra Sikandarpur Banthra, Banthara
- Village
- Location in Uttar Pradesh, India Banthra Sikandarpur (India)
- Coordinates: 26.693327°N 80.834622°E
- Country: India
- State: Uttar Pradesh
- District: Lucknow

Area
  - Total: 7.038 km^{2} (2.717 sq mi)

Population (2011)
  - Total: 10,989
  - Density: 1,561/km^{2} (4,044/sq mi)

Languages
  - Official: Hindi
- Time zone: UTC+5:30 (IST)

Banthra Sikandarpur, also called Banthra or Banthara, is a village in Sarojaninagar block of Lucknow district, Uttar Pradesh, India. As of 2011, its population was 10,989, in 1,885 households. A regular market is held here. The village lands cover an area of 703.8 hectares, of which 341.4 (48.5%) were farmlands as of 2011. Fallow lands covered 182.9 hectares (26.0% of the total), and areas under non-agricultural uses covered 66.2 hectares, or 9.4% of the total land area.

== History ==
At the turn of the 20th century, Banthra Sikandarpur was described (as "Banthara-Sikandarpur") as a large double village on the road from Lucknow to Kanpur. There were then two separate sites, about a mile apart and on the east side of the road. The landowners were Chauhan Rajputs. who held the place in pattidari tenure. According to tradition, they had originally settled at Amausi during the reign of Humayun. At a later date, they went on to establish the nearby villages of Bani and Hamirpur, and they settled at Banthra at about the same time. Sikandarpur had originally been a hamlet of Hamirpur, and its name had been given by the Muslims of Bijnaur.

Banthra Sikandarpur was historically part of the pargana of Bijnaur. The 1901 census recorded it as having a population of 1,620 people, with a Muslim population of 162. At that time, Banthra had a police station, post office, and military encamping ground, while Sikandarpur to the south hosted a market twice a week, on Wednesdays and Sundays. Trade in cattle was the main commercial activity at Sikandarpur's markets. The village lands then covered an area of 1,825 acres, with 89 acres of orchards, mainly to the south of the village. Irrigation was mostly by tanks, although there was a shortage of water for irrigation at the time.
