= Kushk Dasht =

Village in Qazvin province, Iran

Kushk Dasht Persian: کشک دشت
- Village
- Location within Iran
- Coordinates: 36°23′42″N 50°37′55″E
- Country: Iran
- Province: Qazvin
- County: Qazvin
- District: Rudbar-e Alamut-e Sharqi
- Rural District: Alamut-e Pain

Population (2016)
  - Total: 144
- Time zone: UTC+3:30 (IRST)

Kushk Dasht (Persian: کشک دشت) (Note: Also romanized as Kūshk Dasht) is a village in Alamut-e Pain Rural District of Rudbar-e Alamut-e Sharqi District (Note: Formerly Rudbar-e Alamut District) in Qazvin County, Qazvin province, Iran.

== Demographics ==
=== Population ===
At the time of the 2006 National Census, the village's population was 122 in 47 households. The following census in 2011 counted 104 people in 48 households. The 2016 census measured the population of the village as 144 people in 60 households.
