= Heniz =

Village in Qazvin province, Iran

Heniz Persian: هنيز
- Village
- Location within Iran
- Coordinates: 36°27′51″N 50°38′51″E
- Country: Iran
- Province: Qazvin
- County: Qazvin
- District: Rudbar-e Alamut-e Sharqi
- Rural District: Alamut-e Pain

Population (2016)
  - Total: 248
- Time zone: UTC+3:30 (IRST)

Heniz (Persian: هنيز) (Note: Also romanized as Henīz; also known as Hīnz) is a village in Alamut-e Pain Rural District of Rudbar-e Alamut-e Sharqi District (Note: Formerly Rudbar-e Alamut District) in Qazvin County, Qazvin province, Iran.

== Demographics ==
=== Population ===
At the time of the 2006 National Census, the village's population was 518 in 109 households. The following census in 2011 counted 414 people in 99 households. The 2016 census measured the population of the village as 248 people in 77 households.
