= Khoshk Chal =

Village in Qazvin province, Iran

Khoshk Chal Persian: خشكچال
- Village
- Location within Iran
- Coordinates: 36°27′50″N 50°34′30″E
- Country: Iran
- Province: Qazvin
- County: Qazvin
- District: Rudbar-e Alamut-e Sharqi
- Rural District: Alamut-e Bala

Population (2016)
  - Total: 520
- Time zone: UTC+3:30 (IRST)

Khoshk Chal (Persian: خشكچال) (Note: Also romanized as Khoshke Chāl and Khoshke Chal; also known as Khoshkeh Chāl) is a village in Alamut-e Bala Rural District of Rudbar-e Alamut-e Sharqi District (Note: Formerly Rudbar-e Alamut District) in Qazvin County, Qazvin province, Iran.

== Demographics ==
=== Population ===
At the time of the 2006 National Census, the village's population was 200 in 60 households. The following census in 2011 counted 334 people in 119 households. The 2016 census measured the population of the village as 520 people in 171 households. It was the most populous village in its rural district.
