= Dikin =

Village in Qazvin province, Iran

Dikin Persian: ديكين
- Village
- Location within Iran
- Coordinates: 36°27′00″N 50°24′04″E
- Country: Iran
- Province: Qazvin
- County: Qazvin
- District: Rudbar-e Alamut-e Sharqi
- Rural District: Moallem Kalayeh

Population (2016)
  - Total: 340
- Time zone: UTC+3:30 (IRST)

Dikin (Persian: ديكين) (Note: Also romanized as Dīkīn; also known as Dekīn) is a village in Moallem Kalayeh Rural District of Rudbar-e Alamut-e Sharqi District (Note: Formerly Rudbar-e Alamut District) in Qazvin County, Qazvin province, Iran.

== Demographics ==
=== Population ===
At the time of the 2006 National Census, the village's population was 334 in 111 households. The following census in 2011 counted 253 people in 102 households. The 2016 census measured the population of the village as 340 people in 150 households.
