= Atan =

Atan may refer to:

== Mathematics ==
- arctangent (atan), a trigonometric function
  - atan2, the two-argument function implementing the arctangent in many computer languages

== Places ==
- Atan, Armenia
- Atan, Iran

== People ==
- Atan Shansonga (born 1955), Zambian diplomat
- Çağdaş Atan (born 1980), Turkish footballer
- Cem Atan (born 1985), Turkish footballer

== See also ==
- Attan, a Pashtun and Afghan traditional dance
