= Minudasht (disambiguation) =

Minudasht is a city in Golestan Province, Iran.

Minudasht (Persian: مينودشت) may also refer to:

- Minudasht, Markazi
- Minudasht, Qazvin
- Minudasht County, in Golestan Province
