= Garmarud-e Olya =

Village in Qazvin province, Iran

Garmarud-e Olya Persian: گرمارود علیا
- Village
- Location within Iran
- Coordinates: 36°28′03″N 50°24′23″E
- Country: Iran
- Province: Qazvin
- County: Qazvin
- District: Rudbar-e Alamut-e Sharqi
- Rural District: Moallem Kalayeh

Population (2016)
  - Total: 183
- Time zone: UTC+3:30 (IRST)

Garmarud-e Olya (Persian: گرمارود علیا) (Note: Also romanized as Garmārūd-e ‘Olyā; also known as Garmārūd-e Bālā) is a village in Moallem Kalayeh Rural District of Rudbar-e Alamut-e Sharqi District (Note: Formerly Rudbar-e Alamut District) in Qazvin County, Qazvin province, Iran.

== Demographics ==
=== Population ===
At the time of the 2006 National Census, the village's population was 124 in 35 households. The following census in 2011 counted 98 people in 37 households. The 2016 census measured the population of the village as 183 people in 69 households.
