= Garmarud-e Sofla =

Village in Qazvin province, Iran

Garmarud-e Sofla Persian: گرمارود سفلی
- Village
- Location within Iran
- Coordinates: 36°27′43″N 50°23′03″E
- Country: Iran
- Province: Qazvin
- County: Qazvin
- District: Rudbar-e Alamut-e Sharqi
- Rural District: Moallem Kalayeh

Population (2016)
  - Total: 361
- Time zone: UTC+3:30 (IRST)

Garmarud-e Sofla (Persian: گرمارود سفلی) (Note: Also romanized as Garmārūd-e Soflá; also known as Garmārūd and Garmārūd-e Pā'īn) is a village in Moallem Kalayeh Rural District of Rudbar-e Alamut-e Sharqi District (Note: Formerly Rudbar-e Alamut District) in Qazvin County, Qazvin province, Iran.

== Demographics ==
=== Population ===
At the time of the 2006 National Census, the village's population was 184 in 71 households. The following census in 2011 counted 208 people in 79 households. The 2016 census measured the population of the village as 361 people in 128 households.
