= Bukan (disambiguation) =

Bukan is a city in West Azerbaijan Province, Iran.

Bukan may also refer to:

- Bukan County, West Azerbaijan Province, Iran
- Bukan (electoral district), an Iranian parliamentary electoral district in West Azerbaijan Province
- Bukan, Qazvin, a village in Qazvin Province, Iran
