= Kuchenan =

Village in Qazvin province, Iran

Kuchenan Persian: كوچنان
- Village
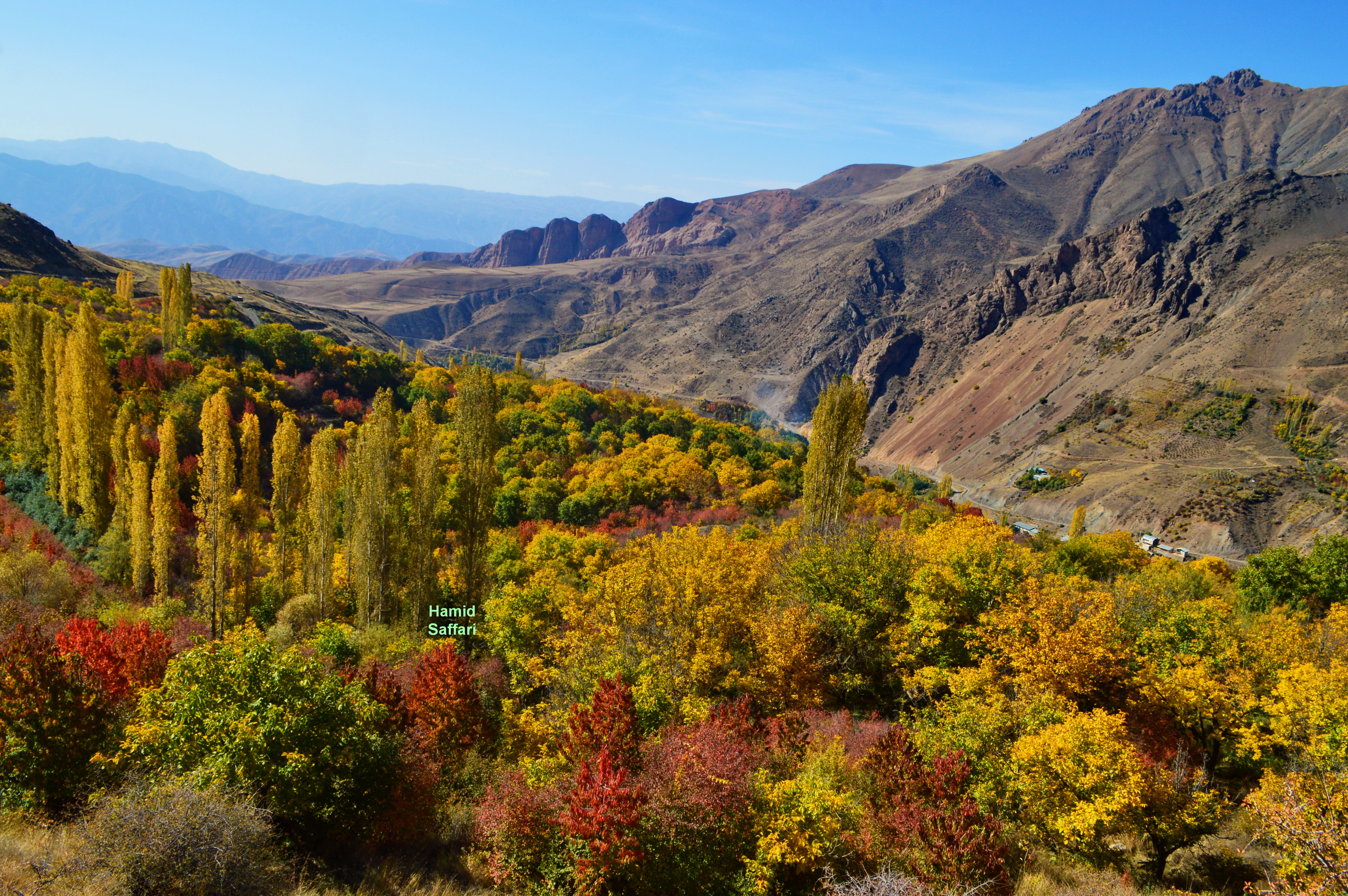
- The village of Kuchenan

- Location within Iran
- Coordinates: 36°29′01″N 50°31′31″E
- Country: Iran
- Province: Qazvin
- County: Qazvin
- District: Rudbar-e Alamut-e Sharqi
- Rural District: Alamut-e Bala

Population (2016)
  - Total: 445
- Time zone: UTC+3:30 (IRST)

Kuchenan (Persian: كوچنان) (Note: Also romanized as Kūchenān) is a village in Alamut-e Bala Rural District of Rudbar-e Alamut-e Sharqi District (Note: Formerly Rudbar-e Alamut District) in Qazvin County, Qazvin province, Iran.

== Demographics ==
=== Population ===
At the time of the 2006 National Census, the village's population was 276 in 90 households. The following census in 2011 counted 174 people in 68 households. The 2016 census measured the population of the village as 445 people in 158 households.
