= Torkan, Qazvin =

Village in Qazvin province, Iran

Torkan Persian: تركان
- Village
- Location within Iran
- Coordinates: 36°22′54″N 50°32′34″E
- Country: Iran
- Province: Qazvin
- County: Qazvin
- District: Rudbar-e Alamut-e Sharqi
- Rural District: Alamut-e Bala

Population (2016)
  - Total: 202
- Time zone: UTC+3:30 (IRST)

Torkan (Persian: تركان) (Note: Also romanized as Torkān) is a village in Alamut-e Bala Rural District of Rudbar-e Alamut-e Sharqi District (Note: Formerly Rudbar-e Alamut District) in Qazvin County, Qazvin province, Iran.

== Demographics ==
=== Population ===
At the time of the 2006 National Census, the village's population was 60 in 19 households. The following census in 2011 counted 38 people in 16 households. The 2016 census measured the population of the village as 202 people in 72 households.
