= Kalayeh, Rudbar-e Alamut-e Sharqi =

Village in Qazvin province, Iran

Kalayeh Persian: كلايه
- Village
- Location within Iran
- Coordinates: 36°27′09″N 50°38′39″E
- Country: Iran
- Province: Qazvin
- County: Qazvin
- District: Rudbar-e Alamut-e Sharqi
- Rural District: Alamut-e Pain

Population (2016)
  - Total: 255
- Time zone: UTC+3:30 (IRST)

Kalayeh (Persian: كلايه) (Note: Also romanized as Kalāyeh) is a village in Alamut-e Pain Rural District of Rudbar-e Alamut-e Sharqi District (Note: Formerly Rudbar-e Alamut District) in Qazvin County, Qazvin province, Iran.

== Demographics ==
=== Population ===
At the time of the 2006 National Census, the village's population was 269 in 103 households. The following census in 2011 counted 247 people in 93 households. The 2016 census measured the population of the village as 255 people in 109 households.
