= Ain, Lucknow =

Village in Uttar Pradesh, India

Ain
- Village
- Nickname: Patel Nagar
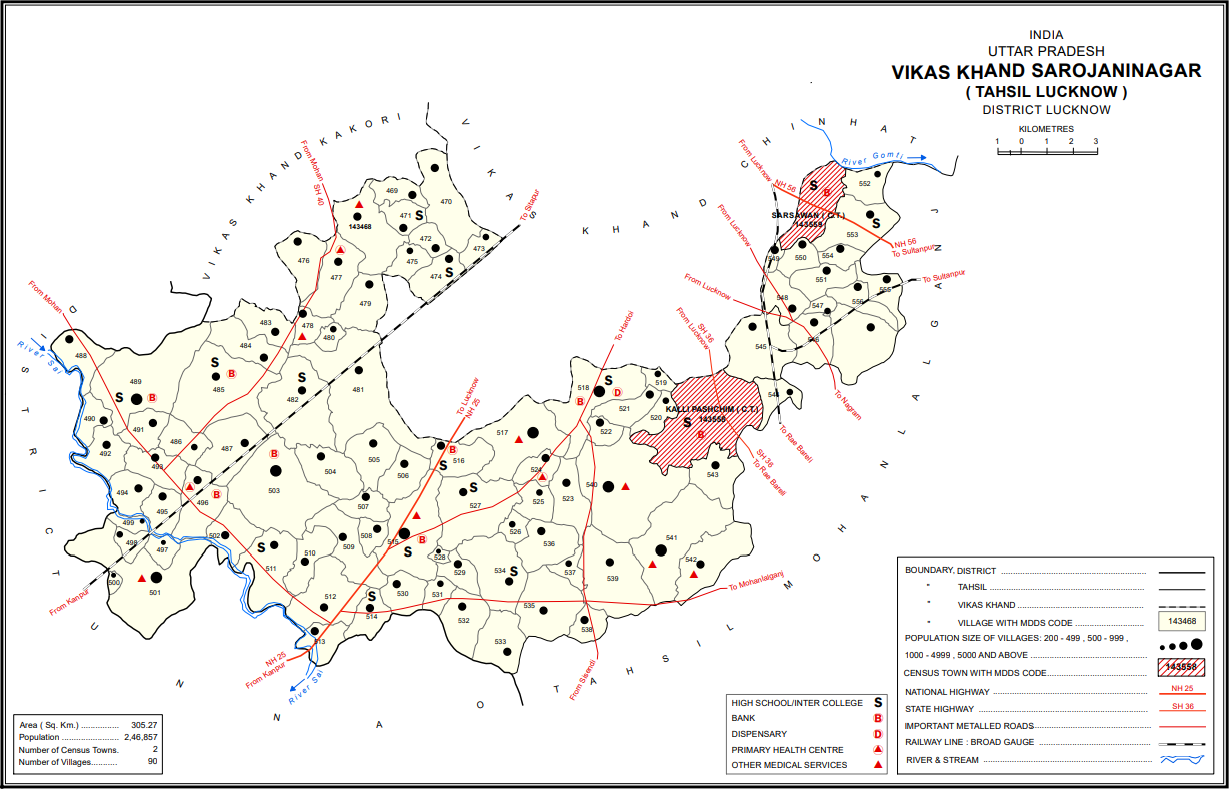
- Map showing Ain (#489) in Sarojaninagar CD block

- Location in Uttar Pradesh, India Ain (India)
- Coordinates: 26°44′55″N 80°43′55″E
- Country: India
- State: Uttar Pradesh
- District: Lucknow

Area
  - Total: 9.766 km^{2} (3.771 sq mi)

Population (2011)
  - Total: 5,052
  - Density: 517.3/km^{2} (1,340/sq mi)

Languages
  - Official: Hindi
- Time zone: UTC+5:30 (IST)
- PIN: 226401

Ain is a village in Sarojaninagar block of Lucknow district, Uttar Pradesh, India. The Nagwa river flows past the northeastern side of the village, and the road to Mohan is on the southwestern side. The village is well-irrigated and has stiff loamy soil with a proportion of clay, and rice is the staple crop. There is a market held on Tuesdays and Saturdays, mostly specialising in livestock.

As of 2011, Ain has a population of 5,052 people, in 960 households.

== History ==
At the turn of the 20th century, Ain was described as a large but otherwise unremarkable village in the northwestern part of the Bijnaur pargana. It had a small school, but no market. Its population in 1901 was 2,319 people, with a large majority belonging to the Kurmi caste.

The 1961 census recorded Ain as comprising 6 hamlets, with a total population of 2,729 (1,431 male and 1,298 female), in 152 households and 152 physical houses. The area of the village was given as 2,128 acres. By this point, Ain did have a market, taking place on Tuesdays and Saturdays and specialising in livestock; average attendance at that point was about 500 people.

The 1981 census recorded Ain as having a population of 3,975 people, in 744 households, and covering an area of 961.97 hectares.
