= Atan, Iran =

Village in Qazvin province, Iran

Atan Persian: اتان
- Village
- Location within Iran
- Coordinates: 36°26′14″N 50°37′32″E
- Country: Iran
- Province: Qazvin
- County: Qazvin
- District: Rudbar-e Alamut-e Sharqi
- Rural District: Alamut-e Pain

Population (2016)
  - Total: 379
- Time zone: UTC+3:30 (IRST)

Atan (Persian: اتان) (Note: Also romanized as Ātān and Etān) is a village in Alamut-e Pain Rural District of Rudbar-e Alamut-e Sharqi District (Note: Formerly Rudbar-e Alamut District) in Qazvin County, Qazvin province, Iran.

== Demographics ==
=== Population ===
At the time of the 2006 National Census, the village's population was 316 in 111 households. The following census in 2011 counted 248 people in 102 households. The 2016 census measured the population of the village as 379 people in 148 households. It was the most populous village in its rural district.
