= Bibipur, Sarojaninagar =

Village in Uttar Pradesh, India

Bibipur
- Village
- Location in Uttar Pradesh, India Bibipur (India)
- Coordinates: 26.660174°N 80.849106°E
- Country: India
- State: Uttar Pradesh
- District: Lucknow

Area
  - Total: 2.929 km^{2} (1.131 sq mi)

Population (2011)
  - Total: 1,963
  - Density: 670.2/km^{2} (1,736/sq mi)

Languages
  - Official: Hindi
- Time zone: UTC+5:30 (IST)

Bibipur is a village in Sarojaninagar block of Lucknow district, Uttar Pradesh, India. As of 2011, its population was 1,963, in 376 households. The village lands cover an area of 292.9 hectares, of which 191.8 (65.4%) were farmland as of 2011. Total fallow land covered an area of 45.1 hectares as of the same year (43 current and 2.1 other), making up 15.4% of the total area. Areas under non-agricultural use covered 25.6 hectares, or 8.7% of the total area. It is the seat of a gram panchayat.
