= Moallem Kalayeh =

City in Qazvin province, Iran

Moallem Kalayeh Persian: معلم كلايه
- City
- Location within Iran
- Coordinates: 36°27′05″N 50°28′34″E
- Country: Iran
- Province: Qazvin
- County: Qazvin
- District: Rudbar-e Alamut-e Sharqi

Population (2016)
  - Total: 2,223
- Time zone: UTC+3:30 (IRST)

Moallem Kalayeh (Persian: معلم کلایه) (Note: Also romanized as Mo’allem Kalāyeh (English: Castle of the Teacher)) is a city in, and the capital of, Rudbar-e Alamut-e Sharqi District (Note: Formerly Rudbar-e Alamut District) of Qazvin County, Qazvin province, Iran. It also serves as the administrative center for Moallem Kalayeh Rural District.

== Demographics ==
=== Language and ethnicity ===
People of the city are Tat and they speak the Tati language.

=== Population ===
At the time of the 2006 National Census, the city's population was 2,196 in 684 households. The following census in 2011 counted 1,607 people in 515 households. The 2016 census measured the population of the city as 2,223 people in 708 households.

== See also ==
- Kalayeh Bon
- Toneka Bon
