= Chandrawal, Lucknow =

Village in Uttar Pradesh, India

Chandrawal Chandrāwal
- Village
- Location in Uttar Pradesh, India Chandrawal (India)
- Coordinates: 26.712726°N 80.879999°E
- Country: India
- State: Uttar Pradesh
- District: Lucknow

Area
  - Total: 2.424 km^{2} (0.936 sq mi)

Population (2011)
  - Total: 2,057
  - Density: 848.6/km^{2} (2,198/sq mi)

Languages
  - Official: Hindi
- Time zone: UTC+5:30 (IST)

Chandrawal, also spelled Chandraval, is a village in Sarojaninagar block of Lucknow district, Uttar Pradesh, India. As of 2011, its population was 2,057, in 341 households. It is the seat of a gram panchayat.
