= Ain, Iran =

Ain آیین
- Village
- Location within Iran
- Coordinates: 36°27′42″N 50°24′27″E
- Country: Iran
- Province: Qazvin
- County: Qazvin
- Bakhsh: Rudbar-e Alamut
- Rural District: Moallem Kalayeh

Population (2006)
  - Total: 13
- Time zone: UTC+3:30 (IRST)
  - Summer (DST): UTC+4:30 (IRDT)

Ain (Persian: آیین, also Romanized as Ā'īn) is a village in Moallem Kalayeh Rural District, Rudbar-e Alamut District, Qazvin County, Qazvin Province, Iran. At the 2006 census, the village population comprised 13 residents, in 4 households.
