= Mati, Lucknow =

Village in Uttar Pradesh, India

Mati Māti
- Village
- Location in Uttar Pradesh, India Mati (India)
- Coordinates: 26.713932°N 80.922356°E
- Country: India
- State: Uttar Pradesh
- District: Lucknow

Area
  - Total: 11.723 km^{2} (4.526 sq mi)

Population (2011)
  - Total: 5,833
  - Density: 497.6/km^{2} (1,289/sq mi)

Languages
  - Official: Hindi
- Time zone: UTC+5:30 (IST)

Mati is a village in Sarojaninagar block of Lucknow district, Uttar Pradesh, India. As of 2011, its population was 5,833, in 1,071 households. A regular market is held here. It is the seat of a gram panchayat.

== Land use ==
The village lands cover an area of 1,172.3 hectares, of which 724.6 (61.8%) are farmland as of 2011. Of the total cultivated area, 80.4% was irrigated, all by well or tube well. Fallow lands covered an area of 72.9 hectares as of the same year, or 6.2% of the total land area. Lands under non-agricultural uses covered 295.4 hectares, or 25.2% of the total. Additionally, there was a forest cover of 75.1 hectares recorded in 2011, making up 6.4% of the total area.
