= Dadupur =

Village in Uttar Pradesh, India

Dadupur Dādupur
- Village
- Location in Uttar Pradesh, India Dadupur (India)
- Coordinates: 26.689262°N 80.817116°E
- Country: India
- State: Uttar Pradesh
- District: Lucknow

Area
  - Total: 1.259 km^{2} (0.486 sq mi)

Population (2011)
  - Total: 1,406
  - Density: 1,117/km^{2} (2,892/sq mi)

Languages
  - Official: Hindi
- Time zone: UTC+5:30 (IST)

Dadupur is a village in Sarojaninagar block of Lucknow district, Uttar Pradesh, India. As of 2011, its population was 1,406, in 229 households. It is the seat of a gram panchayat.

== Archaeology ==
Archaeological excavation here at Dadupur in 2000-01, under the direction of Rakesh Tewari and R. K. Srivastava, indicated the presence of an early settlement in three basic phases. The first period consisted of layers 8 through 12, which were the lowest layers at the site. The "lower limit" of the first period was estimated to be a calibrated 1500 BCE. During this period, inhabitants generally lived in wattle-and-daub structures. A few kiln-fired bricks were found among the remains from this period, but no traces of brick structures were found. The second phase belongs to the Painted Grey Ware culture, but the corresponding layers (layers 7 and 7a) were much smaller than the others — about 20-35 cm thick, compared to 2-2.5 m for the first (earliest) period and 1.6 m for the third (latest) period. As for the third period, corresponding to the uppermost layers 1 through 6, it was associated with the Northern Black Polished Ware culture, with Painted Grey Ware remaining in use during this period.
