= Avan, Qazvin =

Village in Qazvin province, Iran

Avan Persian: اوان
- Village
- Location within Iran
- Coordinates: 36°29′32″N 50°27′01″E
- Country: Iran
- Province: Qazvin
- County: Qazvin
- District: Rudbar-e Alamut-e Sharqi
- Rural District: Moallem Kalayeh

Population (2016)
  - Total: 349
- Time zone: UTC+3:30 (IRST)

Avan (Persian: اوان) (Note: Also romanized as Āvān, Ovaan, and Ovan; also known as Anwān) is a village in Moallem Kalayeh Rural District of Rudbar-e Alamut-e Sharqi District (Note: Formerly Rudbar-e Alamut District) in Qazvin County, Qazvin province, Iran. Avan is located on Ovan Lake.

== Demographics ==
=== Population ===
At the time of the 2006 National Census, the village's population was 368 in 128 households. The following census in 2011 counted 218 people in 78 households. The 2016 census measured the population of the village as 349 people in 136 households.
