= Khasarwara =

Village in Uttar Pradesh, India

Khasarwara Khasarwāra
- Village
- Location in Uttar Pradesh, India Khasarwara (India)
- Coordinates: 26.666866°N 80.830946°E
- Country: India
- State: Uttar Pradesh
- District: Lucknow

Area
  - Total: 1.782 km^{2} (0.688 sq mi)

Population (2011)
  - Total: 1,314
  - Density: 737.4/km^{2} (1,910/sq mi)

Languages
  - Official: Hindi
- Time zone: UTC+5:30 (IST)

Khasarwara is a village in Sarojaninagar block of Lucknow district, Uttar Pradesh, India. As of 2011, its population was 1,314, in 259 households. It is the seat of a gram panchayat, which also includes the village of Dhaavaapur.
