= Zavardasht =

Village in Qazvin province, Iran

Zavardasht Persian: زواردشت
- Village
- Location within Iran
- Coordinates: 36°29′41″N 50°26′00″E
- Country: Iran
- Province: Qazvin
- County: Qazvin
- District: Rudbar-e Alamut-e Sharqi
- Rural District: Moallem Kalayeh

Population (2016)
  - Total: 361
- Time zone: UTC+3:30 (IRST)

Zavardasht (Persian: زواردشت) (Note: Also romanized as Zavār Dasht and Zavārdasht) is a village in Moallem Kalayeh Rural District of Rudbar-e Alamut-e Sharqi District (Note: Formerly Rudbar-e Alamut District) in Qazvin County, Qazvin province, Iran.

== Demographics ==
=== Population ===
At the time of the 2006 National Census, the village's population was 185 in 69 households. The following census in 2011 counted 176 people in 77 households. The 2016 census measured the population of the village as 361 people in 133 households.
