= Minudasht, Qazvin =

Village in Qazvin province, Iran

Minudasht Persian: مينودشت
- Village
- Location within Iran
- Coordinates: 36°24′08″N 50°33′25″E
- Country: Iran
- Province: Qazvin
- County: Qazvin
- District: Rudbar-e Alamut-e Sharqi
- Rural District: Alamut-e Bala

Population (2016)
  - Total: 170
- Time zone: UTC+3:30 (IRST)

Minudasht (Persian: مينودشت) (Note: Also romanized as Mīnūdasht; formerly known as Shotor Khan (شترخان)) is a village in, and the capital of, Alamut-e Bala Rural District in Rudbar-e Alamut-e Sharqi District (Note: Formerly Rudbar-e Alamut District) of Qazvin County, Qazvin province, Iran.

== Demographics ==
=== Population ===
At the time of the 2006 National Census, the village's population was 183 in 58 households. The following census in 2011 counted 179 people in 63 households. The 2016 census measured the population of the village as 170 people in 70 households.
