= Miranpur Pinwat =

Village in Uttar Pradesh, India

Miranpur Pinwat Mirānpur Pinwat
- Village
- Location in Uttar Pradesh, India Miranpur Pinwat (India)
- Coordinates: 26.719492°N 80.8597°E
- Country: India
- State: Uttar Pradesh
- District: Lucknow

Area
  - Total: 3.047 km^{2} (1.176 sq mi)

Population (2011)
  - Total: 4,656
  - Density: 1,528/km^{2} (3,958/sq mi)

Languages
  - Official: Hindi
- Time zone: UTC+5:30 (IST)

Miranpur Pinwat, also spelled Pinvat, is a village in Sarojaninagar block of Lucknow district, Uttar Pradesh, India. As of 2011, its population was 4,656, in 888 households. A regular market is held here, and there is also a public library. It is the seat of a gram panchayat.
