= Zavarak, Qazvin =

Village in Qazvin province, Iran

Zavarak Persian: زوارك
- Village
- Location within Iran
- Coordinates: 36°23′41″N 50°40′13″E
- Country: Iran
- Province: Qazvin
- County: Qazvin
- District: Rudbar-e Alamut-e Sharqi
- Rural District: Alamut-e Pain

Population (2016)
  - Total: 102
- Time zone: UTC+3:30 (IRST)

Zavarak (Persian: زوارك) (Note: Also romanized as Zavārak) is a village in, and the capital of, Alamut-e Pain Rural District in Rudbar-e Alamut-e Sharqi District (Note: Formerly Rudbar-e Alamut District) of Qazvin County, Qazvin province, Iran.

== Demographics ==
=== Population ===
At the time of the 2006 National Census, the village's population was 176 in 57 households. The following census in 2011 counted 126 people in 43 households. The 2016 census measured the population of the village as 102 people in 39 households.
