= Kushk, Qazvin =

Village in Qazvin province, Iran

Kushk Persian: کوشک
- Village
- Location within Iran
- Coordinates: 36°28′04″N 50°25′21″E
- Country: Iran
- Province: Qazvin
- County: Qazvin
- District: Rudbar-e Alamut-e Sharqi
- Rural District: Moallem Kalayeh

Population (2016)
  - Total: 227
- Time zone: UTC+3:30 (IRST)

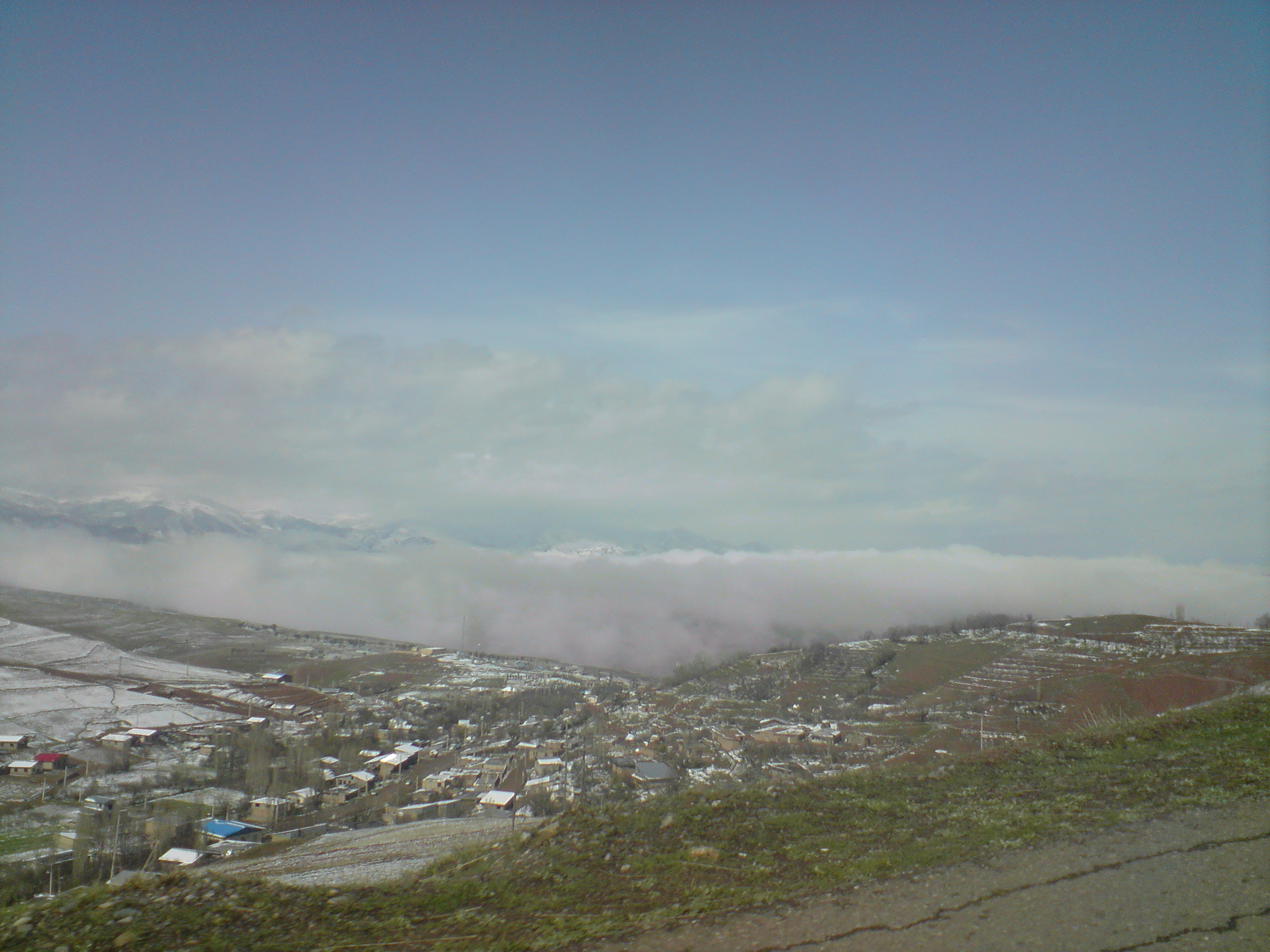
Kushk Village

Kushk (Persian: کوشک) (Note: Also romanized as Kūshk) is a village in Moallem Kalayeh Rural District of Rudbar-e Alamut-e Sharqi District (Note: Formerly Rudbar-e Alamut District) in Qazvin County, Qazvin province, Iran.

== Demographics ==
=== Population ===
At the time of the 2006 National Census, the village's population was 397 in 76 households. The following census in 2011 counted 114 people in 49 households. The 2016 census measured the population of the village as 227 people in 83 households.
