= El Ain (disambiguation) =

El Ain, also written Al Ain and Al Ayn, is a transliteration of Arabic: ٱلْعَيْن, al-ʿayn and may refer to:

- Al Ain, a city in Abu Dhabi, United Arab Emirates
  - Al Ain Region
  - Al Ain Oasis
  - Al Ain FC, a football club
- Al-Ain FC, a Saudi Arabian football club
- Al Ain (horse), a racehorse
- Al-Ayn, Oman, an archaeological site in Oman
- El Ain, Tunisia, a town in Sfax Governorate, Tunisia
- El Ain, Ash Shamal, Lebanon, a town in Batroun District, North Governorate, Lebanon
- El Ain, Beqaa, Lebanon, a town in Baalbek District, Beqaa Governorate, Lebanon
- El Ain, Jabal Lubnan, Lebanon (North), a town in Keserwan District, Mount Lebanon Governorate, Lebanon
- El Ain, Jabal Lubnan, Lebanon (South), a town in Baabda District, Mount Lebanon Governorate, Lebanon

== See also ==
- Ain (disambiguation)
- Ayn (disambiguation)
