= Baghdasht, Qazvin =

Village in Qazvin province, Iran

Baghdasht Persian: باغ دشت
- Village
- Location within Iran
- Coordinates: 36°24′05″N 50°27′25″E
- Country: Iran
- Province: Qazvin
- County: Qazvin
- District: Rudbar-e Alamut-e Sharqi
- Rural District: Alamut-e Bala

Population (2016)
  - Total: 210
- Time zone: UTC+3:30 (IRST)

Baghdasht (Persian: باغ دشت) (Note: Also romanized as Bāgh Dasht and Bāghdasht; also known as Bādāshāh and Badasht) is a village in Alamut-e Bala Rural District of Rudbar-e Alamut-e Sharqi District (Note: Formerly Rudbar-e Alamut District) in Qazvin County, Qazvin province, Iran.

== Demographics ==
=== Population ===
At the time of the 2006 National Census, the village's population was 193 in 55 households. The following census in 2011 counted 124 people in 52 households. The 2016 census measured the population of the village as 210 people in 77 households.
