= Jahanabad, Lucknow =

Village in Uttar Pradesh, India

Jahanabad Jahānābād
- Village
- Location in Uttar Pradesh, India Jahanabad (India)
- Coordinates: 26.684105°N 80.845175°E
- Country: India
- State: Uttar Pradesh
- District: Lucknow

Area
  - Total: 0.439 km^{2} (0.169 sq mi)

Population (2011)
  - Total: 454
  - Density: 1,030/km^{2} (2,680/sq mi)

Languages
  - Official: Hindi
- Time zone: UTC+5:30 (IST)

Jahanabad is a village in Sarojaninagar block of Lucknow district, Uttar Pradesh, India. As of 2011, its population was 454, in 80 households. The village lands cover an area of 43.9 hectares, of which 34.7 (79.0%) were farmland as of 2011, while areas under non-agricultural uses covered 6.6 hectares, or 15.0% of the total village area. It is part of the gram panchayat of Kishunpur Kodia.
