= Ain (surname) =

Ain is a surname. Notable people with the surname include:

- Gregory Ain (1908–1988), American architect
- Kenneth B. Ain (fl. 21st century), American endocrinologist and author
- Martin Eric Ain (1967–2017), born Martin Erich Stricker, American musician
