= Dineh Kuh =

Village in Qazvin province, Iran

Dineh Kuh Persian: دينه كوه
- Village
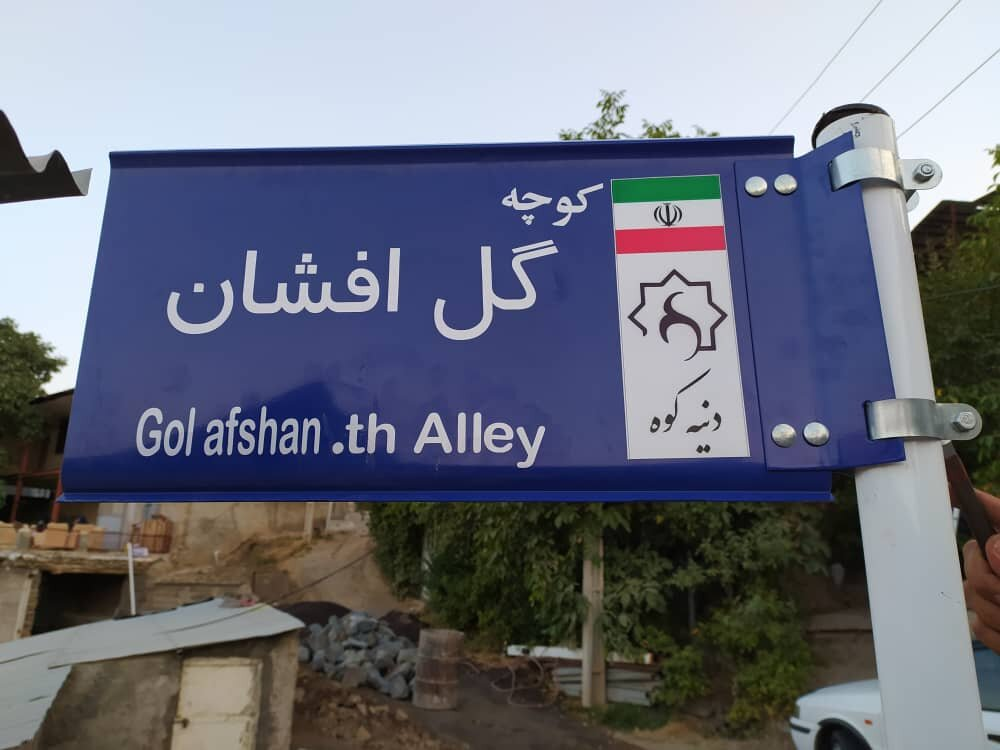
- Alley plates named after village mothers

- Location within Iran
- Coordinates: 36°20′16″N 50°27′00″E
- Country: Iran
- Province: Qazvin
- County: Qazvin
- District: Rudbar-e Alamut-e Sharqi
- Rural District: Alamut-e Bala

Population (2016)
  - Total: 257
- Time zone: UTC+3:30 (IRST)

Dineh Kuh (Persian: دينه كوه) (Note: Also romanized as Dīneh Kūh;) known as The Village of Mothers is a village in Alamut-e Bala Rural District of Rudbar-e Alamut-e Sharqi District, (Note: Formerly Rudbar-e Alamut District) Qazvin County, Qazvin province, Iran. In the years 2020-2023, after the renovations carried out by the village residents, the streets of the village were named after the women and mothers of the village; hence the village became known as "The Village of Mothers."

== Demographics ==
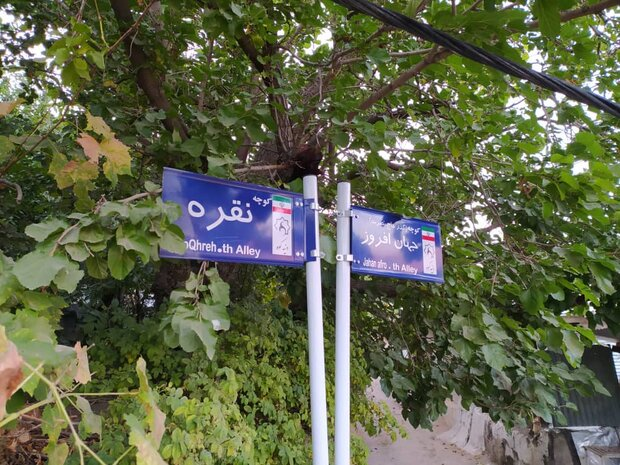
The names of the mothers of the villagers on the street plaques

=== Population ===
At the time of the 2006 National Census, the village's population was 79 in 38 households. The following census in 2011 counted 14 people in five households. The 2016 census measured the population of the village as 257 people in 95 households.
