= Sarojaninagar =

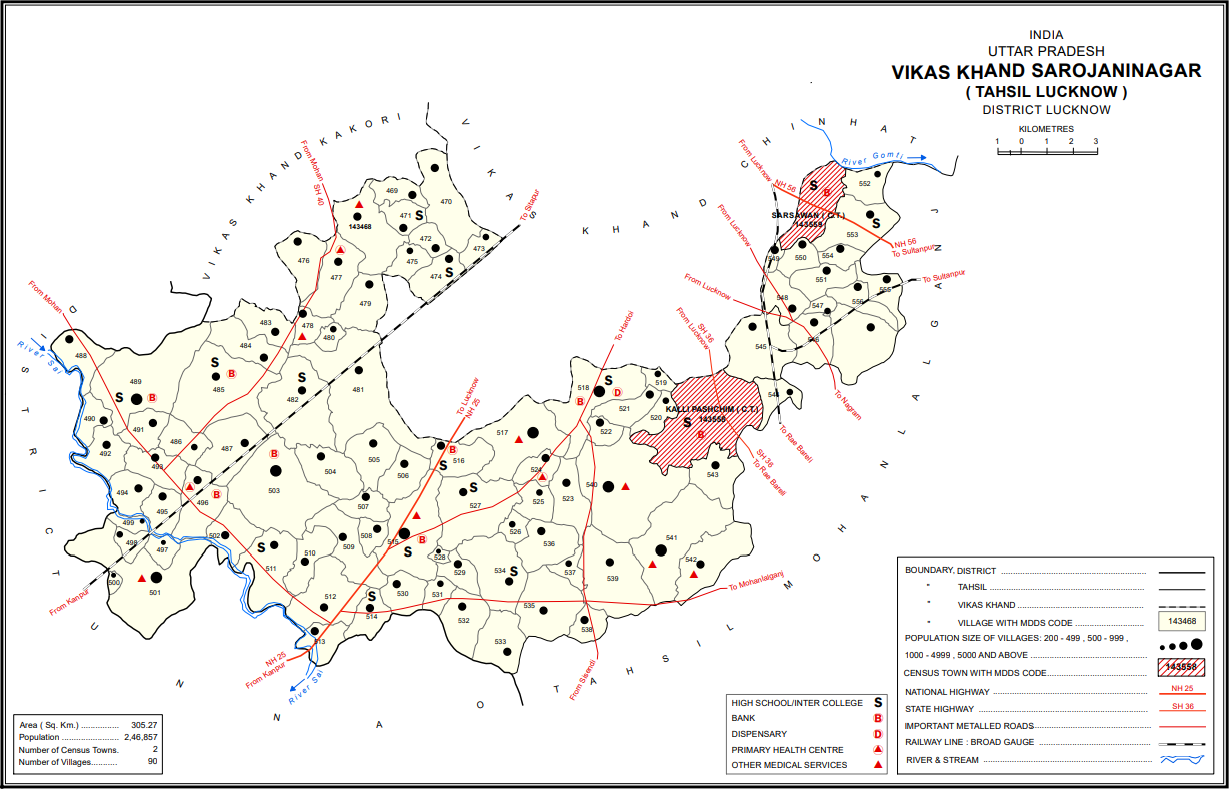
Map of Sarojaninagar CD block

Sarojininagar, also spelled Sarojani Nagar, is a community development block in Lucknow district, Uttar Pradesh, India. It is part of the tehsil of Lucknow and it includes 90 villages. As of 2011, its population was 224,045, in 40,923 households.

Sarojininagar is also the name of two wards of Lucknow, together making up 32 mohallas of the city.

== Demographics ==
As of 2011, the sex ratio of Sarojininagar block is 903 females for every 1000 males, with 53% of block residents (117,745) being male and 47% (106,300) being female. The sex ratio in the 0-6 age group was 920. Members of scheduled castes made up 37.2% of the Sarojininagar block population, and members of scheduled tribes made up 0.11%. The literacy rate of Sarojininagar block in 2011 was 73.0% (81.1% among males and 64.1% among females).

In 2011, Sarojininagar block's workforce consisted of 74,661 people (33.3% of the overall block population). More men (59,508, or 50.5%) were workers than women (15,153, or 14.3%). A plurality of workers were employed in agriculture — 23.53% were cultivators who owned or leased their own land, and another 26.26% were agricultural labourers who worked someone else's land for wages. A further 6.25% were household industry workers, and the remaining 43.96% were other workers.

=== Demographic history ===
The 1961 census recorded Sarojininagar block as having a total population of 107,880 people (57,375 male and 50,505 female), in 22,327 households and 22,022 physical houses.

The 1981 census recorded Sarojininagar as the most heavily industrialised of Lucknow district's development blocks, with 56 registered industrial firms. At the time, it comprised 106 villages, including 94 gram sabhas and 13 nyaya panchayats.

== Land use ==
Sarojininagar block covers an area of 30,526.9 hectares, of which 58.2% (17,770.8 hectares, not counting fallow land) is farmland as of 2011. Most of this farmland is irrigated: 16,054.8 hectares, or 90.3% as of the same year. Irrigation is mostly by tanks or lakes. Areas under non-agricultural use made up 3,537.4 hectares as of 2011, or about 11.6% of the total land area. Land considered barren and unsuitable for cultivation covered 1219 hectares. As of 2011, 1,027 hectares in this block are covered by forests.

== Villages ==
Sarojininagar block comprises the following 90 villages:

Village name	Total land area (hectares)	Population (in 2011)
Maunda	588.4	4,987
Dhighiya	190.6	1,457
Sadrauna	402.6	3,886
Pyare Pur	184.2	1,912
Kaliya Khera	164.9	1,453
Alinagar Sonhara	503.4	588
Anora	338.1	1,511
Samda Khera	142.5	952
Palenhada	293.6	1,240
Behta	462.4	3,638
Khurrampur	156.2	1,420
Chakoli	317.8	1,942
Andhpur Umrao	83.7	684
Piparsand	1,298.6	4,336
Lonha	612	3,365
Bhadoi	243.2	1,573
Mavaipadhiyana	326.2	2,565
Amavan	827.6	2,301
Ramdas Pur	156	941
Sahijanpur	462	1,858
Godoli	322.2	1,789
Ain	976.6	5,052
Nanmau	210.7	1,746
Sadulla Nagar	223.4	1,918
Terwa	285.6	2,180
Narainpur	304.5	2,596
Darab Nagar	166.6	1,161
Saidpur Puhri	199.2	1,178
Haroni	282.8	2,446
Hulas Khera	121.4	462
Bhatgoan Pande	122.7	787
Mirzapur Lutova	92.3	386
Bahdanamau	40.8	350
Rahimnagar Padhiyana	1,020	7,851
Latif Nagar	302.8	3,263
Bhat Goan	981.3	7,131
Garhi Chunoti	424.5	3,817
Andhpurdev	260.5	1,096
Aorava	243.9	1,604
Ramchora	250.4	2,258
Dadoopur	125.9	1,406
Khandedev	527.6	3,639
Bhokapur	248.6	1,081
Benti	636.2	4,520
Sarai Sahjadi	252.9	2,328
Bani	183.5	1,741
Pahar Pur	182.3	2,050
Banthra Sikander Pur	703.8	10,989
Miranpur Pinvat	304.7	4,656
Natkur	679.8	5,091
Bijnor	751.6	14,105
Rasoolpur Iduria	131.2	536
Alinagar Khurd	127.8	772
Ashraf Nagar	258.4	2,202
Ahmadpur Urf Kamlapur	122.9	1,272
Noorpur Bhadarsa	327	1,204
Chandraval	242.4	2,057
Saraiya	144.8	932
Shahpur Majhgaon	131.6	782
Kuroni	725.2	4,640
Jahanabad	43.9	454
Kishunpur Kodia	151.1	1,749
Khasarwara	178.2	1,314
Dhawapur Khasarwara	107.7	846
Bibipur	292.9	1,963
Memora	194.2	2,842
Neeva	518.5	2,679
Khatola	470.2	1,280
Makhdoompur Kaithi	342	1,405
Ratoli	161.5	924
Bhagu Khera	177.8	1,160
Jaitikhera	565.2	2,806
Mati	1,172.3	5,833
Parvar Pashchim	921	5,341
Parvar Poorab	481.1	2,280
Kalli Poorab	312.6	2,963
Birura	139.5	827
Baraulikhalilabad	167.2	1,531
Sevai	248.3	2,665
Devamau	61.4	983
Gusval Kala	122.5	1,197
Malak	84.8	3,627
Harihar Pur	284.3	3,668
Muzaffar Nagar Ghusval	224.4	1,497
Ardonamau	203.2	922
Ahmamau	444.2	3,427
Yusufnagar	124.4	1,392
Hasanpur Khevali	210.9	2,338
Nijampur Majhigaon	210.5	2,210
Barauna	516.7	4,329
