= Ayn =

Ayn may refer to:

- Ayin or ʿayn, a letter in many Semitic scripts
- Ayn, Savoie, a commune of the Savoie département of France
- Ghayn (Cyrillic) (Ғ,ғ), a letter used in the Bashkir, Kazakh, and Tajik alphabets
- Ayn Rand, Russian-born American novelist and philosopher
- Anyang Airport, China, IATA code AYN
- San'ani Arabic (ISO 639-3 ayn), an Arabic dialect spoken in Yemen
- Al Ain, a city in the Emirate of Abu Dhabi in the United Arab Emirates
- Cayn, or Ayn, a disputed region of Somaliland

== See also ==
- Ain (disambiguation)
- Al Ayn (disambiguation)
- Ayin (disambiguation)
