= Piparsand =

Village in Uttar Pradesh, India

- Village
- Location in Uttar Pradesh, India Piparsand (India)
- Coordinates: 26.746168°N 80.808945°E
- Country: India
- State: Uttar Pradesh
- District: Lucknow

Area
  - Total: 12.986 km^{2} (5.014 sq mi)

Population (2011)
  - Total: 4,336
  - Density: 333.9/km^{2} (864.8/sq mi)

Languages
  - Official: Hindi
- Time zone: UTC+5:30 (IST)

Piparsand is a village in Sarojaninagar block of Lucknow district, Uttar Pradesh, India. As of 2011, its population was 4,336, in 769 households. It has three schools providing primary education, a post office, and a public library. It is the seat of a gram panchayat.

Piparsand's village lands cover an area of 1,298.6 hectares, of which 897.9 (69%) is farmland as of 2011. As of the same year, areas used for non-agricultural purposes cover 166 hectares, which is 13% of the total land area. There is also a forest cover of 144.3 hectares.
