= Ramchaura =

Village in Uttar Pradesh, India

Ramchaura Rāmchaura
- Village
- Location in Uttar Pradesh, India Ramchaura (India)
- Coordinates: 26.705651°N 80.816521°E
- Country: India
- State: Uttar Pradesh
- District: Lucknow

Area
  - Total: 2.504 km^{2} (0.967 sq mi)

Population (2011)
  - Total: 2,258
  - Density: 901.8/km^{2} (2,336/sq mi)

Languages
  - Official: Hindi
- Time zone: UTC+5:30 (IST)

Ramchaura, also spelled Ramchora, is a village in Sarojaninagar block of Lucknow district, Uttar Pradesh, India. As of 2011, its population was 2,258, in 425 households. It is the seat of a gram panchayat.
