= Ain (Bible) =

Ain (/ˈeɪjɪn/; from the Hebrew עין for spring) was a Levitical city in the ancient Tribe of Judah territory.

== History ==
Ain is referred to in the Bible in the Book of Joshua as a city allotted to the tribe of Judah and as a village allotted to the tribe of Simeon, whose territory lay within the land allotted to the tribe of Judah. Ain was one of the southernmost cities of Judah, towards the Dead Sea coast of Edom, on the border of the Negev between Shilhim and Rimmon.
