= Alamut-e Pain Rural District =

Rural district in Qazvin province, Iran

Alamut-e Pain Rural District Persian: دهستان الموت پایین
- Rural District
- Location within Iran
- Coordinates: 36°24′N 50°43′E
- Country: Iran
- Province: Qazvin
- County: Qazvin
- District: Rudbar-e Alamut-e Sharqi
- Established: 1987
- Capital: Zavarak

Population (2016)
  - Total: 3,241
- Time zone: UTC+3:30 (IRST)

Alamut-e Pain Rural District (Persian: دهستان الموت پایین) is in Rudbar-e Alamut-e Sharqi District (Note: Formerly Rudbar-e Alamut District) of Qazvin County, Qazvin province, Iran. Its capital is the village of Zavarak.

== Demographics ==
=== Population ===
At the time of the 2006 National Census, the rural district's population was 3,596 in 1,198 households. There were 2,999 inhabitants in 1,144 households at the following census of 2011. The 2016 census measured the population of the rural district as 3,241 in 1,290 households. The most populous of its 39 villages was Atan, with 379 people.

=== Other villages in the rural district ===
- Garmarud
- Heniz
- Kalayeh
- Kushk Dasht
- Ruch-e Olya
- Ruch-e Sofla
