= Kenneth B. Ain =

American endocrinologist

Kenneth B. Ain is an American endocrinologist and Carmen L. Buck Chair and Professorship of Cancer Research and Oncology at the University of Kentucky, and also currently a licensed doctor and published author, being collected by libraries worldwide.
