= Âyine =

Ottoman magazine (1921–1922)

- Categories: Literature, politics, poetry, satire
- Frequency: Weekly
- Founded: 1921
- Final issue: 1922
- Based in: Istanbul
- Language: Ottoman-Turkish
- Website: Âyîne

Âyin (English: "Mirror") was an Ottoman satirical magazine published between 1921 and 1922 in Istanbul. Each of the 72 issues consisted of four pages and were published once a week.

The owner of the magazine was the businessman Semih Lütfi, the owner of the Suhulet Library, while Eşref Nesib was the director of the magazine. From the 9th issue of the journal, it can be seen that Yusuf Ziya, who published his writings and poems under his own name and under his pseudonym, was the journal's most influential author. The content of the journal focuses on political and social topics, which are mainly satirically treated, as well as poetry, stories and humorous depictions such as cartoons.
