= Ain Saarmann =

Estonian politician

Ain Saarmann (born 6 April 1939 in Põltsamaa) is an Estonian politician.

1992–1993, he was Minister of Economic Affairs.
