= Alamut-e Bala Rural District =

Rural district in Qazvin province, Iran

Alamut-e Bala Rural District Persian: دهستان الموت بالا
- Rural District
- Location within Iran
- Coordinates: 36°25′N 50°32′E
- Country: Iran
- Province: Qazvin
- County: Qazvin
- District: Rudbar-e Alamut-e Sharqi
- Established: 1987
- Capital: Minudasht

Population (2016)
  - Total: 5,067
- Time zone: UTC+3:30 (IRST)

Alamut-e Bala Rural District (Persian: دهستان الموت بالا) is in Rudbar-e Alamut-e Sharqi District (Note: Formerly Rudbar-e Alamut District) of Qazvin County, Qazvin province, Iran. Its capital is the village of Minudasht.

== Demographics ==
=== Population ===
At the time of the 2006 National Census, the rural district's population was 4,398 in 1,485 households. There were 3,622 inhabitants in 1,379 households at the following census of 2011. The 2016 census measured the population of the rural district as 5,067 in 1,924 households. The most populous of its 37 villages was Khoshk Chal, with 520 people.

=== Other villages in the rural district ===
- Andaj
- Baghdasht
- Dineh Kuh
- Kuchenan
- Masoudabad
- Torkan
