= Pirzadeh (surname) =

Pirzadeh is a surname. Notable people with the surname include:

- Mojtaba Pirzadeh (born 1986), Iranian actor
- Rasoul Pirzadeh (born 1982), Iranian footballer
- Zinat Pirzadeh (born 1967), Iranian-Swedish female comedian

== See also ==
- Pirzadeh, village in Iran
