= Ahmamau =

Ahimamau
- Village
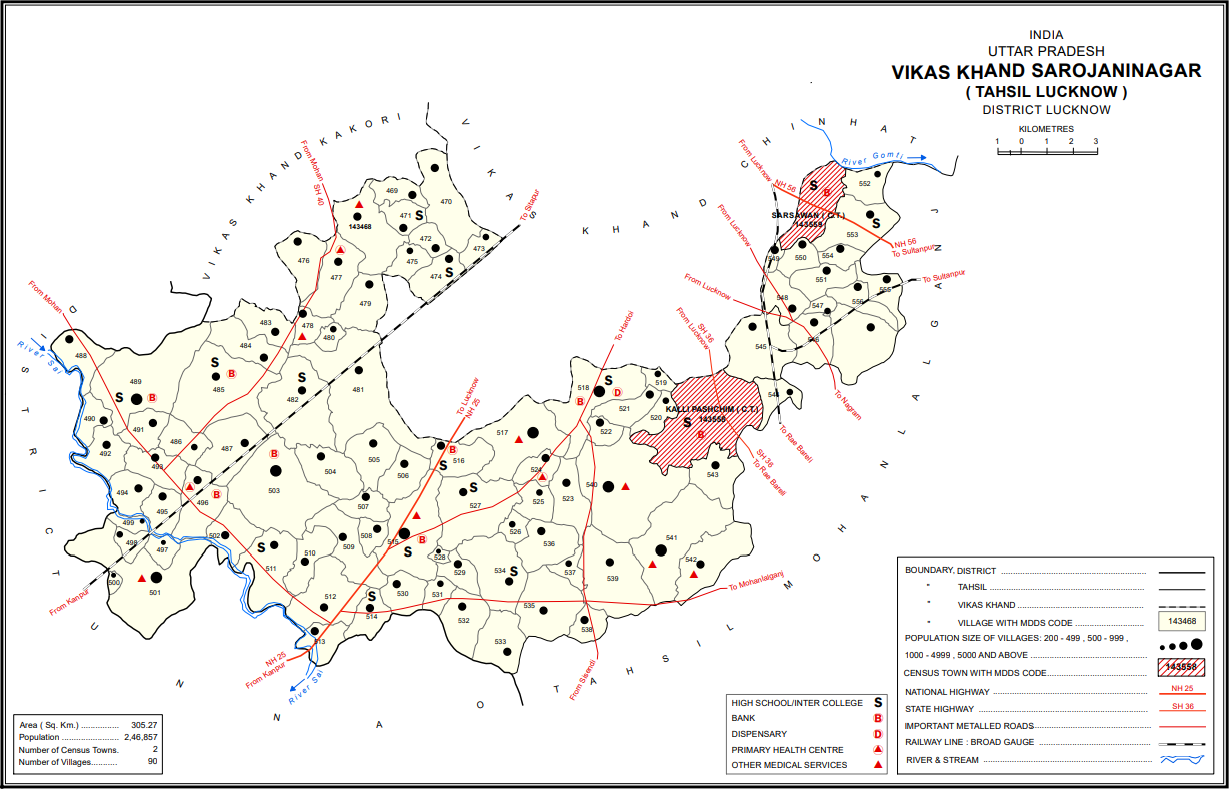
- Map showing Ahmamau (#553) in Sarojaninagar CD block

- Location in Uttar Pradesh, India Ahimamau (India)
- Coordinates: 26.80°N 81.00°E
- Country: India
- State: Uttar Pradesh
- District: Lucknow

Population (2011 Census of India)
  - Total: 3,427

Languages
  - Official: Hindi
- Time zone: UTC+5:30 (IST)
- PIN: 226101

Ahimamau is a village in Sarojininagar block of Lucknow district, Uttar Pradesh, India. According to 2011 Census of India the population of the village is 3427; 1,793 are males and 1,634 are females.

It is the seat of a gram panchayat, which also includes the village of Ardonamau.
