= Zavarak, Babol =

Zavarak زوارك
- Village
- Country: Iran
- Province: Mazandaran
- County: Babol
- Bakhsh: Bandpey-ye Sharqi
- Rural District: Sajjadrud

Population (2006)
  - Total: 36
- Time zone: UTC+3:30 (IRST)
  - Summer (DST): UTC+4:30 (IRDT)

Zavarak (Persian: زوارك, also Romanized as Zavārak) is a village in Sajjadrud Rural District, Bandpey-ye Sharqi District, Babol County, Mazandaran Province, Iran. At the 2006 census, its population was 36, in 9 families.

Historical accounts suggest that many Georgians migrated to Mazandaran, settling in areas such as Bandpey and Ashraf ol Belad (modern-day Behshahr). It is speculated that Siyâvash may have been buried in Zavarak, a district of Bandpey in Mazandaran, where ceremonies honoring Siyâvash, the legendary hero of Ferdowsi’s Shahnameh, were historically held. This site, known as Siyâvashon or Sovashon, warrants further research to establish any connection, as no conclusive evidence has yet been found.

In the Zavarak district near the Sovashon temple, another notable figure, Nur-Ali Khan, a painter renowned in his own time, was also buried. He died around 1780.
