= Ain Tammus =

Estonian footballer and coach

Personal information
- Full name: Ain Tammus
- Date of birth: 15 July 1969 (age 57)
- Place of birth: Põltsamaa, Estonia
- Height: 1.84 m (6 ft 1/2 in)
- Position: Goalkeeper

Team information
- Current team: Levadia Tallinn (goalkeeping coach)

Senior career*
Years	Team	Apps	(Gls)
1993–1994	Vall Tallinn		
1994–1995	Norma Tallinn	22	(0)
1995–1996	FC Lantana Tallinn	2	(0)
1996–1997	Flora Tallinn	14	(0)
1998	Lelle	17	(0)
1998–1999	Tulevik Viljandi	31	(0)
2000–2001	TVMK Tallinn	18	(0)

International career
1997–1998	Estonia	3	(0)

Managerial career
- 2007–: Estonia (youth) (goalkeeping coach)
- 2008–2012: Flora Tallinn (goalkeeping coach)
- 2013–: Levadia Tallinn (goalkeeping coach)
- * Club domestic league appearances and goals

Ain Tammus (born 15 July 1969) is an Estonian goalkeeping coach and a former professional footballer. He is currently a goalkeeping coach at Levadia Tallinn.

== International career ==
Tammus has represented the Estonia national football team 3 times. He made his international debut on 11 July 1997 against Latvia.
