= Ain Saar =

Estonian freedom fighter

Ain Saar (born 8 August 1968) is a Võro punk rocker, and freedom fighter, the leader of the group Vaba-Sõltumatu Noorte Kolonn Nr.1 (Free Independent Youth Column No. 1) of December 20, 1987, which struggled against the Soviet rule. He was exiled in 1988 by the authorities of Estonian SSR to Sweden where he lived in Skarpnäck, Stockholm.

In 2006, he campaigned for the removal of the Bronze Soldier of Tallinn.
