= Ain Andressoo =

Estonian archer and architect (1935–2023)

Ain Andressoo (24 November 1935 – 9 February 2023) was an Estonian archer and architect.

From 1968 to 1976 he was a member of Estonian archers' national team. From 1971 to 1974 he won three times Estonian Championships.

From 1964 to 1971 he worked at the architecture bureau Eesti Maaehitusprojekt. From 1971 to 1993 he worked at the architecture bureau Eesti Projekt. He has projected several sport and other facilities, most notably Radisson Blu Hotel Olümpia.
