= Marion Kalmus =

British artist

Marion Kalmus is a British artist who produced work between 1993 and 2002. After a first profession as a fresco restorer, Kalmus studied Fine Art at Goldsmiths, University of London. Whilst still a student she was commissioned to make a work at the Royal Festival Hall, London She won the Nicholas and Andre Tooth Scholarship and used the prize to film her work Deserter which was shown at the Tate Liverpool 1995.

== Career ==
Kalmus was the Kettle's Yard Artist Fellow in Residence at Pembroke College 1997-1998. Kalmus returned to Cambridge in 2000 to stage her surround sound film Restoration Drama at the former Festival Theatre, Cambridge. The work was "a silent movie of a play performance, projected in a disused theatre with the sound of a ghostly audience responding aurally to the action on the 'stage'."

In 2002 her work was shown at the Victoria and Albert Museum, London. She was nominated for the Jerwood Artist’s Platform 2004.

=== Digital art ===
Kalmus was an early adopter of digital technologies, making computer-controlled artworks in the early 1990s when such technologies in fine art were still very unusual. She was nominated for both Digital Art and Fine Art Sculpture prizes within a year: The Imaginaria Digital Art prize at the Institute of Contemporary Arts 1999 and the Jerwood Sculpture Prize for 2001. Her work, Deserter, was a "computer-coordinated slide program" in which she is featured as a wandering romantic heroine roaming the sand dunes of Australia. The work incorporated thousands of still images presented in rapid fire onto the surfaces of two-way mirrors.

=== Sculpture and public art ===
Her sculpture proposal for the Jerwood Sculpture Prize, titled Before and After, addressed landscape design history, by taking the form of a rock formation that recalled the derelict ruins of Whitley Court, a Victorian Era mansion. The maquette for the sculpture was described as raising "complex questions about the nature of artificial landscape" and the "eternal paradox of art as imitation of nature." Richard Cork of The Times states that Kalmus wants viewers of the work to "meditate on time, nature and change."

Kalmus' permanent architectural installation for the National Botanic Garden of Wales opened in December 2001. The work, titled Thirty Three Thousand, Seven Hundred and Ninety Eight, was influenced by ancient Welsh roundhouse structures such as Castell Henllys. The installation incorporates a water feature, reminding visitors to the garden of the importance of water in the natural order. A 15-foot high inverted glass cone protrudes through the round roof of the gatehouse; water cascades down the interior of the cone into a raised circular pool filled with stones. The lighting scheme highlights text that is etched into the glass, describing plants that are in danger of becoming extinct. The title of the work references 33,798 endangered plant species. Kalmus' installation along with two other associated works won a Fountain Society award.

== Sources ==
- Kalmus, Marion (1995). Deserter. Texts: Lewis Johnson, Wil Pennycook Greaves. Cardiff: Chapter. ISBN 1900029022. Published to accompany an exhibition at the Tate Gallery, Liverpool, Chapter, Cardiff, Oriel 31, Powys, 29th April -4th November 1995
- Kalmus, Marion (1997). I won't promise you the earth. Cambridge: Kettle's Yard. ISBN 0907074650.
- Marion Kalmus : restoration drama. Cambridge: Commissions East. 2001. ISBN 0907074863.
