= Ain Mäesalu =

Estonian archeologist

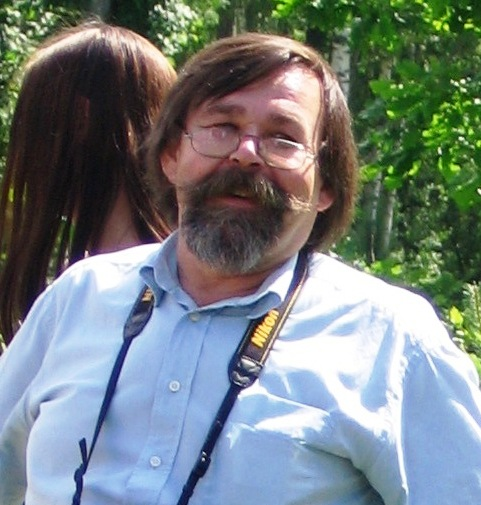
Ain Mäesalu

Ain Mäesalu (born 23 February 1955 in Emmu-Aruküla) is an Estonian archeologist.

He is teaching archeology at University of Tartu.

His main fields of interest are archeology related to Estonia's medieval castles and city of Tartu, and medieval weaponry.

In 2012, he was awarded with Order of the White Star, IV class.
