= Bijnaur, Lucknow =

Residential area in Uttar Pradesh, India

Bijnaur
- Village
- Location in Uttar Pradesh, India Bijnaur (India)
- Coordinates: 26.74042°N 80.904183°E
- Country: India
- State: Uttar Pradesh
- District: Lucknow

Area
  - Total: 7.516 km^{2} (2.902 sq mi)

Population (2011)
  - Total: 14,105
  - Density: 1,877/km^{2} (4,861/sq mi)

Languages
  - Official: Hindi
- Time zone: UTC+5:30 (IST)

Bijnaur is a residential area in Sarojaninagar block of Lucknow district, Uttar Pradesh, India. It was historically a major town, serving as the seat of a pargana in Lucknow tehsil. It is located east of the main road from Lucknow to Kanpur. East of Bijnaur, there is a series of jhils that make up the source of the Bakh river. As of 2011, its population was 14,105, in 2,515 households. It is the seat of a municipal corporation.

== History ==
According to tradition, Bijnaur was founded by and named after Bijli Raja, a Pasi king who had a fort at Nathawan, a bit to the north. Bijnaur is then said to have been captured by the legendary Muslim conqueror Ghazi Saiyyad Salar Masud, and the remains of old brick tombs on the west side of Bijnaur are said to mark the graves and shrine of Sufism of some of his companions. According to H. R. Nevill, however, it is unlikely that Salar Masud ever came here, and instead the Muslim conquest of Bijnaur only happened at the end of the 12th century CE. The conqueror, he claimed, would have been Qazi e Islam and shah shahab the ancestor of the Lucknow shah and the Pirzadahs of Bijnaur. The Pirzadahs then ruled Bijnaur for several generations before losing control due to family conflicts. In the east side of bijnour historical shrine of Takiya Hazrat Syed mastali shah madari ra.

The shrine of Hazrat syed mastali shah madari ra. is located near the bakh river on the east side of bijnour. He was the descendant of madariya family. He sent by his sheikh to spread the islam in the year of 1634. When he comes to the bijnour his disciple built a khanqah and mosque for spread the knowledge of Deen. At present there are 6 shrines and broken walls of mosques present here.

1. Hazrat syed mastali shah madari ra.

2. Disciple of Mastali shah ra.

3. Hazrat syed Kashif ali shah ra.

4. Hazrat syed wahid Ali shah ra.

5. Hazrat syed safdar ali shah ra.

6. Hazrat sayyeda Jahanara fatima ra.

And two more buzurgan e Deen in the generation of Hazrat syed mastali shah madari ra. Whose shrine located also in the bijnour at the distance of 2.5 km from takiya mastali shah.

1. Sajjadanasheen Hazrat syed azmat Ali shah chisti Sabri v Qadri Bijnouri ra.

2. Hazrat syed sufi Shaukat Ali shah ra.

Pirgharana generation is found in bijnour, The pir faqirs generations people known as Syed shah. He is from Sadat Syed. The last gaddinasheen of pirgharana was Sufi Syed Shaukat Ali shah madari ra. The shrine of Sufi Shaukat Ali shah is also located in bijnour near by Shrine of his ustad and Grandfather Hazrat Syed Azmat ali shah.

At the turn of the 20th century, Bijnaur was described as a town picturesquely located among trees, with good farmland surrounded by wide usar plains. Its houses were mostly of mud, except for the brick houses of the Sheikh zamindars, and there was a bazaar held twice weekly along with a cattle market. There was also an upper primary school with a regular attendance of about 60 students. Bijnaur had formerly been a centre of trade, but it had declined substantially in the late 19th century, after the British annexation of Oudh State in 1856. The local manufacture of cotton cloth had also dwindled, although it remained a significant local industry at the turn of the century. Its population in 1901 was 3,593, including a Muslim population of 1,326.
