= Peter Kalmus (artist) =

Slovak artist and activist

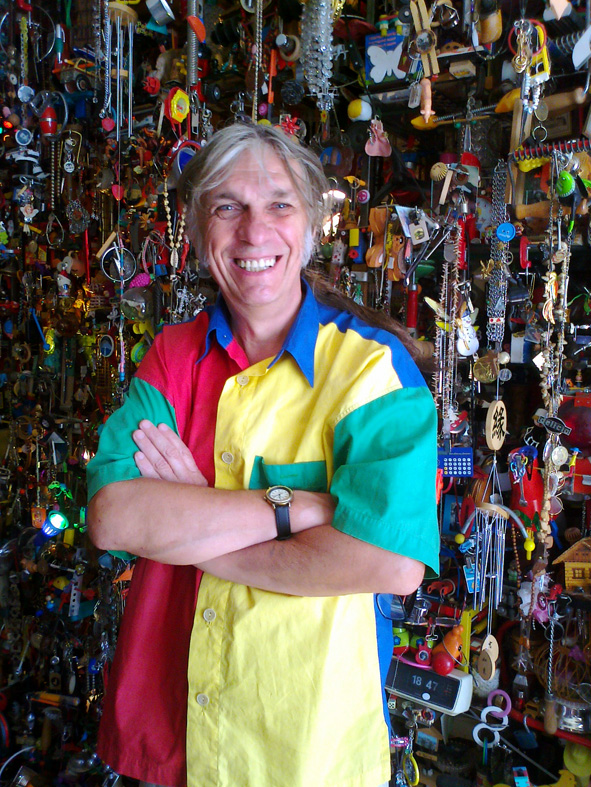
- Born: 28 August 1953 (age 72); Piešťany, Czechoslovak Socialist Republic (now Slovakia)
- Occupations: Visual artist, activist

Peter Kalmus (born 28 August 1953 in Piešťany) is a Slovak self-taught visual artist and activist.

== Family background ==
Kalmous was born to a German Jewish father of Wolfgang Hans Hartman Kalmus and a Slovak Lutheran mother Mária (née Češeková). Soon after his birth, his parents divorced and his father returned to Germany. In spite of distance, Kalmous and his father reconnected during the Prague Spring and remain very close to this day.

== Life during communism ==
From early childhood, Kalmous has lived in Košice. Since the 1970s, he was in close contact with Prague underground cultural scene. His own art mainly consists of painting, photography and performance art (commonly taking the form of public, non-violent protest). In 1989, he co-founded the Košice cell of the Civic Forum party. On 21 November 1989 he organized the first anti-regime demonstration in Košice to commemorate the killing of a local student Michal Hamrák by the Soviet forces during the Warsaw Pact invasion of Czechoslovakia.

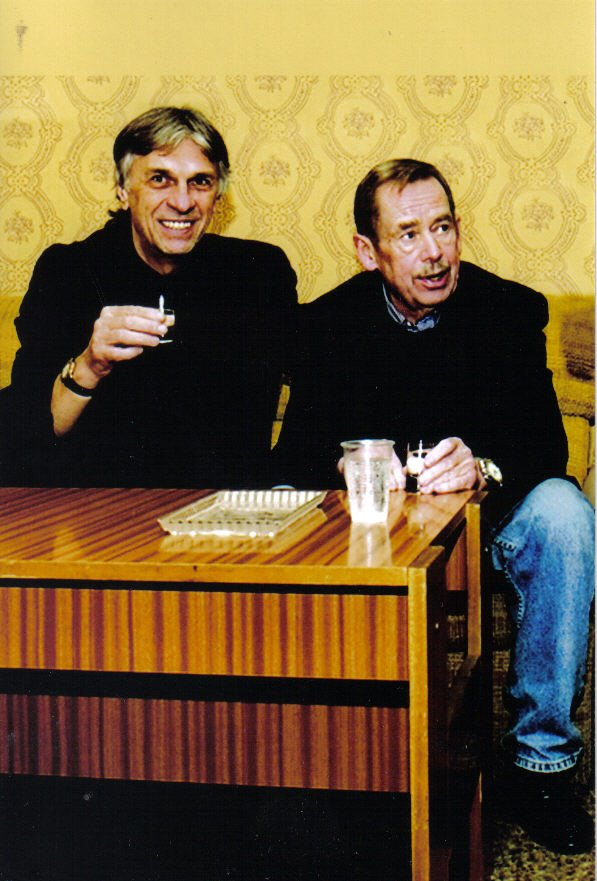
Kalmus meeting Václav Havel in 2008 in Zvolen.

== Life after 1989 ==
After the Postoj, Kalmus participated at many art exhibitions in Slovakia and abroad. Kalmous considers creating art to be his lifestyle. His work reflects the public obsession with consumerism as well politics, death, religion, sports. He has several long-running projects, including the cycles Partitúry (Scores) and Korózne grafiky (Corrosive Prints). Perhaps his well-known long-term project has consisted of wrapping a wire around at least one stone every day between 1998 and 2022, representing the 70 000 Jews deported from Slovakia by the fascist Slovak Republic during the World War II. A Peter Kalous' Holocaust monument, consisting of four glass tubes filled with the wire-wrapped stones, was first uncovered in 2016 by the President of Slovakia Andrej Kiska. It is located in a renovated synagogue in the town of Lučenec.

== Activism ==
Kalmus has organized several public protests, which gained media attention. In March 2011 he disrupted the unveiling of a bust of a fascist World War II era politician János Esterházy by throwing toilet paper at the bust. In February 2015 the village of Krajná Bystrá, the birthplace of high-profile communist functionary Vasiľ Biľak, Kalmus together with a fellow artist Ľuboš Lorenz spilled red pain over a bust of Biľak, previously installed there by the Communist Party of Slovakia. In August 2016 he removed the Hammer and Sickle symbol from a Red Army memorial in Košice. The public reactions to Kalmous' activism has been mixed. The liberal Denník N praised the removal of communist symbols from the memorial, while the conservative website Postoj criticized is as a meaningless publicity stunt, disrespectful to the memory of World War II victims.

== Selection of Kalmus art ==
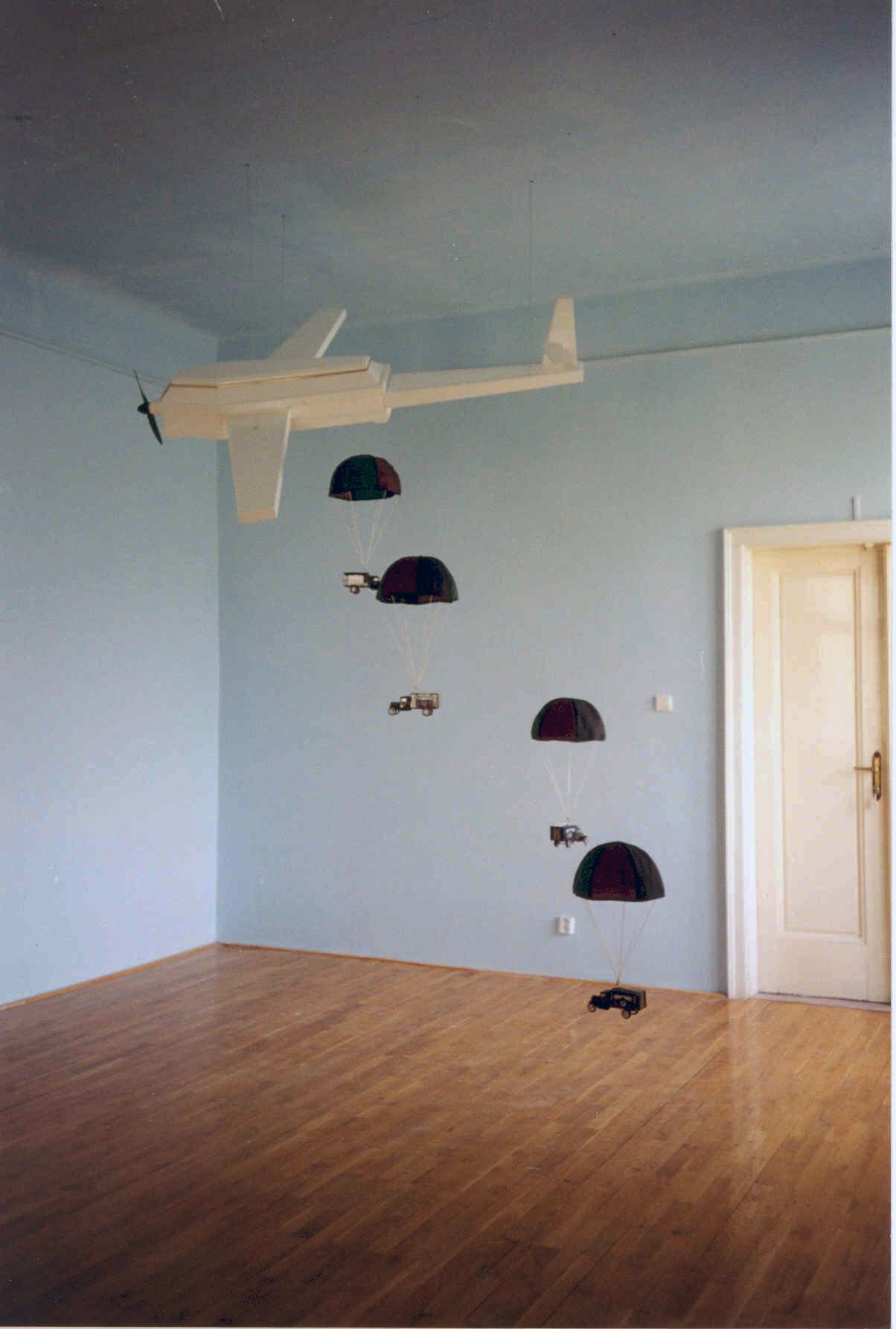
