= Moallem Kalayeh Rural District =

Rural district in Qazvin province, Iran

Moallem Kalayeh Rural District Persian: دهستان معلم كلايه
- Rural District
- Location within Iran
- Coordinates: 36°29′N 50°25′E
- Country: Iran
- Province: Qazvin
- County: Qazvin
- District: Rudbar-e Alamut-e Sharqi
- Established: 1987
- Capital: Moallem Kalayeh

Population (2016)
  - Total: 3,170
- Time zone: UTC+3:30 (IRST)

Moallem Kalayeh Rural District (Persian: دهستان معلم كلايه) is in Rudbar-e Alamut-e Sharqi District (Note: Formerly Rudbar-e Alamut District) of Qazvin County, Qazvin province, Iran. It is administered from the city of Moallem Kalayeh.

== Demographics ==
=== Population ===
At the time of the 2006 National Census, the rural district's population was 2,329 in 761 households. There were 1,573 inhabitants in 635 households at the following census of 2011. The 2016 census measured the population of the rural district as 3,170 in 1,211 households. The most populous of its 15 villages was Zarabad, with 895 people.

=== Other villages in the rural district ===
- Avan
- Dikin
- Garmarud-e Olya
- Garmarud-e Sofla
- Kushk
- Zavardasht
