= Ain Kalmus =

Estonian writer and theologian

Ain Kalmus (given name Evald Mänd; 8 June 1906 Emmaste Parish, Hiiu County – 15 November 2001) was an Estonian writer and theologian.

From 1925 to 1929, he studied at the Baptist Evangelical Seminary at Keila. After that he finished Andover Newton Theological School (in the United States), defending his master's thesis. After returning from the United States, he worked as a Baptist minister in Tartu and Southern Estonia, later also as a pastor in Tallinn. In 1944, he and his family escaped to Sweden and in 1948, to the United States.

== Works ==
- 1942: Soolased tuuled (Salty Winds), novel
- 1945: Öö tuli liiga vara (Night Came Too Early), novel
- 1948: Hingemaa (Land of Spirits), novel
- 1950: Prohvet (Prophet, or The Unfaithful), novel
- 1969: Juudas (Judas), novel
