= Rudbar-e Alamut-e Sharqi District =

District in Qazvin province, Iran

Rudbar-e Alamut-e Sharqi District Persian: بخش رودبار الموت شرقی
- District
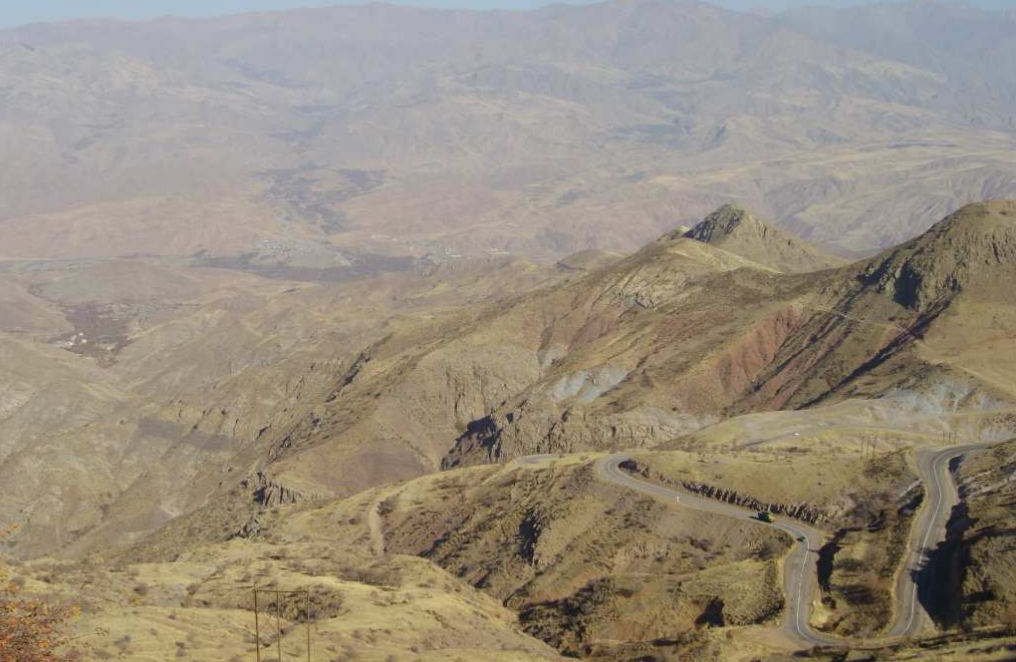
- Landscape in Alamut region

- Location within Iran
- Coordinates: 36°26′N 50°36′E
- Country: Iran
- Province: Qazvin
- County: Qazvin
- Capital: Moallem Kalayeh

Population (2016)
  - Total: 13,701
- Time zone: UTC+3:30 (IRST)

Rudbar-e Alamut-e Sharqi District (Persian: بخش رودبار الموت شرقی) (Note: Formerly Rudbar-e Alamut District (بخش رودبار الموت)) is in Qazvin County, Qazvin province, Iran. Its capital is the city of Moallem Kalayeh.

== Demographics ==
=== Language and ethnicity ===
The majority of people in the district are Tats who speak a dialect of the Tati language. A minority of Azerbaijani people also live in the district.

=== Population ===
At the time of the 2006 National Census, the district's population was 12,519 in 4,128 households. The following census in 2011 counted 9,801 people in 3,673 households. The 2016 census measured the population of the district as 13,701 inhabitants in 5,133 households.

=== Administrative divisions ===
Rudbar-e Alamut-e Sharqi District Population
Administrative Divisions	2006	2011	2016
Alamut-e Bala RD	4,398	3,622	5,067
Alamut-e Pain RD	3,596	2,999	3,241
Moallem Kalayeh RD	2,329	1,573	3,170
Moallem Kalayeh (city)	2,196	1,607	2,223
Total	12,519	9,801	13,701
RD = Rural District

== See also ==
- Dineh Kuh, "The Village of Mothers"
