= Sinor =

Sinor may refer to:

- Sinor, Gujarat, a settlement in India
- Phasor, or sinor, a complex number in certain representations of periodic functions
- Denis Sinor (1916–2011), scholar in the history of Central Asia
- Jennifer Sinor, American writer

== See also ==
- Signor (disambiguation)
- Sinar (disambiguation)
- Siner (disambiguation)
- Sinur
