= Relvãokellermann =

Studio for industrial design based in Munich, Germany

Relvãokellermann is an internationally operating studio for industrial design based in Munich, Germany. It was founded by the German-Portuguese industrial design duo Ana Relvão (*1986, Coimbra, Portugal) and Gerhardt Kellermann (*1983, Vișeu de Sus, Romania). In addition to his work as an industrial designer, Gerhardt Kellermann is also a product photographer.

== History ==
=== Early years and initial collaboration ===
Relvão and Kellermann met in 2011 while working for different designers in Munich.

Relvão had recently moved to Germany for an internship with the German designer Stefan Diez. She has studied equipment design at the Faculdade de Belas-Artes in Lisbon (FBAUL). During her studies she began working at the studio of Portuguese designer Miguel Vieira Baptista.

Kellermann graduated in 2008 with a degree in industrial design from the State Academy of Fine Arts in Stuttgart. During his studies, he worked as an assistant in the studio of Nitzan Cohen. Following his diploma thesis on the design history of Braun, Kellermann moved from Stuttgart to Munich.

After initially pursuing separate careers, Relvão and Kellermann began working on joint projects. During this period, Kellermann collaborated with fashion designer Ayzit Bostan on the installation Replika in Munich's Hofgarten. In 2012, together with Herbert H. Schultes, they founded the design collective Industrial Design Associates and worked as external designers for kitchen manufacturer Bulthaup.

=== Founding and development of the office ===
Following their collaboration with Bulthaup, they declined an offer to become design directors in order to work independently for various companies. After dissolving their partnership with Schultes, they founded Relvãokellermann as an independent design studio in Munich in 2014.

Since then, the studio has worked for both national and international clients, including Auerberg, Cor, Huawei, Fissler, Gaggenau, Ligre, and Samsung. Since 2018, Relvão and Kellermann have been responsible for the art direction of the Bavarian office furniture manufacturer Gumpo, for which they have designed multiple products. In collaboration with the owners of the Munich interior studio Holzrausch and designer Jan Heinzelmann, they developed the kitchen system J*Gast, which enables parametrically scalable built-in kitchens through a specialized construction method.

Relvão and Kellermann have given lectures and held teaching positions at universities and art academies in Germany, Portugal, and Italy. In 2018, they were guest professors at the State Academy of Fine Arts in Stuttgart.

Additionally, they have served as jurors for various international design awards.

Their work has received national and international design awards and is included in the permanent collection of Die Neue Sammlung in Munich.

== Awards (Selection) ==
- German Design Award Gold 2025, Ligre Siji
- Stylepark Selected Award 2024, YAY and OHH for Gumpo
- iF Design Award 2024, Siji for Ligre
- German Design Award 2024, J*Gast kitchen system
- Monocle Design Award 2024, J*Gast kitchen system
- Red Dot Design Award 2023, J*Gast kitchen system
- iF Design Award Gold 2023, Pony for Gumpo
- iF Design Award Gold 2023, Youn for Ligre
- Iconic Awards 2023, Best Of The Best, J*Gast Küchensystem
- German Design Award Gold 2023, Otu for Ligre
- iF Design Award 2022, NV8300T & NQ8300T ovens for Samsung
- AIT Innovation Award Architecture + Office 2022, pony for Gumpo
- Stylepark Selected Award 2021, pony for Gumpo
- Kitchen Innovation Award 2021, Best Product, Infinite Line Oven for Samsung
- German Design Award 2020, Normcore Collection for Gumpo
- iF Design Award 2020, Normcore Collection for Gumpo
- iF Design Award 2020, European Oven Package for Samsung
- Bronze Idea Award 2020, Infinite Line Oven for Samsung
- CORE 77 Design Awards 2019, Bookmark Pen for Kikkerland
- Stylepark Selected Award 2018, temp for Gumpo

Additionally, Relvão and Kellermann, both as a team and individually, were nominated for the Sponsorship Award of Munich in 2014, 2016, 2018, and 2020.

== Publications ==
- Fresh Minds New Values, In: Bettina Knoth: 266 Weltverbessernde Projekte. Ein Prozess, Publikation zum DDC Designwettbewerb Was Ist Gut, S. 62-65, ISBN 978-3-9815288-9-3
- Relvãokellermann über Dieter Rams, In: Welt Am Sonntag. Icon Magazin. April 2024, S. 41 (in German)
