= Signer =

Signer may refer to:

- A sign language user
- The author of a signature
- A signing agent

== People ==
- Dan Signer, Canadian-American television writer-producer
- Michael Signer, American politician
- Roman Signer (born 1938), Swiss visual artist
- Rudolf Signer (1903-1990), Swiss chemist
- Walter Signer (1910 -1974), American baseball pitcher
- Walter Signer (cyclist) (born 1937), Swiss cyclist

== See also ==
- Siner (disambiguation)
- Sign (disambiguation)
