= Signor =

Signor, Signore (f. Signora) is an Italian word meaning nobleman.

As a family name it may refer to:

- Tari Signor (born 1967), American actress
- Philip W. Signor, a paleontologist known for Signor–Lipps effect

In the following instances, the word may be intended as a title, or just possibly as a given name

- Signor Brocolini (1841–1906), Irish-born American operatic singer
- Signor Lawanda (1849–1934), American circus performer and strongman

Places:

- Signore, Udaipurwati is a village in Jhunjhunu district of Indian state Rajasthan.

== See also ==
- Signor–Lipps effect
- Signori
