= Hazecha =

Hazecha was a medieval Germanic feminine name. It is also spelled Hazacha, Hazicha, Haziga, Hazeka and Hacicha. It is formed from the base name Haze and the hypocoristic suffice -che. The Yiddish form Hatsekhe (אכצה ,אגצה) is attested between 1096 and 1298. Notable people named Hazecha include:

- Hazecha (fl. 986), treasurer of Quedlinburg Abbey, friend of Walter of Speyer, wrote a lost life of Saint Christopher
- Hazecha of Ballenstedt (died 1063), third abbess of Gernrode
- Haziga of Diessen (died 1104), countess of Scheyern, founder of Scheyern Abbey
- Hazzecha of Krauftal (fl. 1161), abbess, correspondent of Hildegard of Bingen
- Hazeka (recluse) (died 1261), saint from Schermbeck
