= Sign (disambiguation) =

A sign is an entity which indicates another entity.

Sign may also refer to:

== Communication ==
- Signage, the use of signs and visual graphics to convey information
- Signature, a handwritten depiction of someone's name or other mark used as a proof of identity and intent
- Sign (semiotics), anything that communicates a meaning
- Sign language, a languages that uses the visual-manual modality to convey meaning

== Mathematics ==
- Sign (mathematics), an indication of negative and positive numbers
  - Sign function, also known as the signum function
  - Sign of a permutation of a finite set

== Organizations ==
- Project Sign, a project by the U.S. Air Force to investigate unidentified flying objects (UFOs)
- Scottish Intercollegiate Guideline Network, a Scottish group that develops evidence-based medical guidelines

== Music ==
- Segno, a symbol used as a navigation marker in music; translated from the Italian word "sign"
- Sign (band), an Icelandic band
- Sign (Clock DVA album), 1993
- "Sign" (Mr. Children song), 2004
- "Sign" (Beni Arashiro song), 2010
- "Sign" (Flow song), 2010
- "Sign", a 2018 song by Exo from Don't Mess Up My Tempo
- "Sign", a 2015 song by Girls' Generation from Lion Heart
- "Sign", a 2017 song by Got7 from Flight Log: Arrival
- "Sign", a 2001 song by Marcella Detroit from Dancing Madly Sideways
- "Sign", a song by Susumu Hirasawa
  - "Sign-2", a different version of "Sign" from Berserk: Millennium Falcon Hen Seima Senki no Shō
- Sign (Autechre album), 2020
- "The Sign" (song), a 1993 song by Ace of Base
- The Sign (Ace of Base album), a 1993 album by Ace of Base

== Surname ==
- Christopher Sign (1976–2021), American journalist

== Other uses ==
- Astrological sign, one of twelve sectors of the sky in astrology
- Medical sign, an indication of disease, injury, or abnormal physiological state
- Sign (TV series), a 2011 South Korean television series

== See also ==
- Signs (disambiguation)
- Signing (disambiguation)
- Signify (disambiguation)
- The Sign (disambiguation)
- Sign-Trace
- Sine, a trigonometric function of an angle
- Sine (disambiguation)
