= Signos =

Signos may refer to:

- Signos (album), a 1986 album by Soda Stereo
- Signos (TV series), a 2015 Argentinian TV series
- Signos (film), a 1983 documentary film
- Signos Magazine, a Spanish magazine of poetry founded in 1986

== See also ==
- Signs (disambiguation)
