= Sinar (disambiguation) =

Sinar is a Swiss photographic equipment manufacturer.

Sinar may also refer to:

== Newspapers ==
- Sinar Harapan, Jakarta, Indonesia
- Sinar Harian, Shah Alam, Selangor, Malaysia
- Sinar Hindia, Semarang, Dutch East Indies, 1900–1924
- Sinar Indonesia Baru, Medan, North Sumatra, Indonesia
- Sinar Sumatra, Padang, Dutch East Indies, 1905–1930s

== Other uses ==
- Sinar (clothing), a Russian clothing manufacturer
- Sinar (radio station), a Malay-language station in Kuala Lumpur, Malaysia
- Sinar Mas, an Indonesian conglomerate
- Rofin-Sinar, an American manufacturer of laser products

== See also ==
- Sinnar, a city in Maharashtra, India
- Sinnar (Vidhan Sabha constituency), India
- Sinnar University, Sudan
- Sennar (disambiguation)
- Siner (disambiguation)
- Sinor (disambiguation)
