= Mitsuye Yamada =

Japanese-American poet and activist (born 1923)

- Born: Mitsuye Yasutake; July 5, 1923 (age 103); Fukuoka, Fukuoka, Empire of Japan (now Japan)
- Education: University of Cincinnati; New York University; University of Chicago
- Occupations: Poet, writer, activist
- Spouse: Yoshikazu Yamada (m. 1950)
- Children: 4
- Website: www.mitsuyeyamada.com

Mitsuye Yamada (Japanese: 山田 美津江, born July 5, 1923) is a Japanese American poet, essayist, and feminist and human rights activist. She is one of the first and most vocal Asian American women writers to write about the wartime incarceration of Japanese Americans.

== Early life ==
Mitsuye Yamada was born as Mitsuye Mei Yasutake in Fukuoka, Japan on July 5, 1923. Her parents were Jack Kaichiro Yasutake and Hide Shiraki Yasutake, both first-generation Japanese Americans (Issei) residing in Seattle, Washington. Her mother was visiting relatives in Japan when she was born, but had to return to Seattle to care for one of her brothers. Mitsuye was left in the care of a neighboring family in Fukuoka until she was 3 1/2 years old, when her father's friend brought her back to Seattle.

At age 9, she returned to Japan to live with her paternal grandparents for 18 months. Upon returning, she spent the remainder of her childhood in Seattle with her parents and three brothers. Mitsuye's family lived in Beacon Hill, an Asian residential enclave. She graduated from Cleveland High School, receiving her diploma while incarcerated at the Puyallup Assembly Center.

== Incarceration ==
Mitsuye's father Jack Yasutake worked as a translator for the Immigration and Naturalization Service and was also the founder of the local Senryū club whose members would read their poems at the family home in Seattle. When World War II broke out, he was branded an enemy alien and arrested on suspicion of espionage. Like hundreds of other Japanese Americans, Jack was arrested without proof of wrongdoing, and was later exonerated after the war.

In 1942, after Executive Order 9066 was signed, Mitsuye and the rest of her family were incarcerated, first at the Puyallup Assembly Center and then at Minidoka War Relocation Center, Idaho.

== Life after incarceration ==
Mitsuye was allowed to leave the concentration camp with her brother Mike because they renounced loyalty to the Emperor of Japan. Both went on to attend the University of Cincinnati. Mike was soon expelled because the U.S. Air Force was conducting "sensitive wartime research on campus and requested his removal" but Mitsuye was allowed to continue studying at the university (Yamada, 1981).

During the time of Mitsuye's upbringing, Japanese society did not offer women much freedom; they were unable to obtain higher education or choose a husband on their own accord. Yamada's personal and familiar ordeals throughout World War II and observations of her mother's way of life bring anti-racist and feminist attitudes to her works.

Mitsuye married Yoshikazu Yamada in 1950, and the couple had four children together. They, also, have seven grandchildren and three great-grandchildren.

Mitsuye became a naturalized U.S. citizen in 1955. She considers herself Nisei (second-generation Japanese American). She turned 100 on July 5, 2023.

== Education and career ==
Although Yamada began her studies at the University of Cincinnati, she left in 1945 to attend New York University, where she received a B.A. in English and Art in 1947. She earned an M.A. in English Literature and Research from the University of Chicago in 1953. She began teaching at Cypress College in 1968, and retired in 1989 as a professor of English.

Yamada's first publication was the book Camp Notes and Other Poems. The book is a chronological documentary, beginning with "Evacuation" from Seattle, moving in the camp through "Desert Storm," and concluding with poems recounting the move to Cincinnati. "Cincinnati" illustrates the visible racial violence and "The Question of Loyalty" shows the invisible humiliation of the Japanese during World War II. She wrote the book to promote public awareness surrounding the discrimination against the Japanese during the war and to prompt deeper discussion of these issues. With this publication, Yamada challenged Japanese traditions that demand silence from the female. Yamada recognized that Asian American women have not been fully represented as "sites of complex intersections of race, gender, and national identity." (Yamamoto, 2000). Yamada stated, "Asian Pacific women need to affirm our culture while working within to change it." (Geok-Lin, 1993).

Yamada contributed two essays to This Bridge Called My Back: Radical Writings from Women of Color. (1981) "Invisibility is an Unnatural Disaster" reflects the double invisibility of being both Asian and a woman while "Asian Pacific American Women and Feminism" urges women of color to develop a feminist agenda that addresses their particular concerns. That same year, Yamada joined Nellie Wong in a biographical documentary on public television, "Mitsuye and Nellie: Two Asian-American Woman Poets." The film tells of actual events that happened to the speakers, their parents, grandparents and relatives. It uses poetry to tell Asian American history of biculturalism.

In 1982, she received a Vesta Award from the Los Angeles Woman's Building.

"Desert Run: Poems and Stories", returns to her experience at the internment camp. Here, Yamada explores her heritage and discovers that her identity involves a cultural straddle between Japan and the US, which she describes in "Guilty on Both Counts. " Some poems, especially "The Club," indicate that Yamada expanded her point of view to include feminist as well as racist issues because they recount sexual and domestic violence against women. Some of her poems are revisions of earlier versions in Camp Notes. The book contains the history and transition of the Japanese American in the U.S., including Yamada's perspective on gender discrimination.

In 2019, at 96 years old, Yamada released her work, Full Circle: New and Selected Poems Publisher: University of California at Santa Barbara Department of Asian American Studies.

== Works ==
- 1976 – Camp Notes and Other Poems
- 1976 – Anthologized in Poetry from Violence
- 1976 – Lighthouse
- 1976 – The Japanese-American Anthology
- 1981 – Mitsuye and Nellie: Two Asian-American Woman Poets
- 1989 – Desert Run: Poems and stories
- 1992 – Camp notes and other poems [2nd edition]
- 2003 – Three Asian American Writers Speak Out on Feminism
- 2019 — Full Circle: New and Selected Poems

== Compilation inclusions ==
- Sowing Ti Leaves (Multicultural Women Writers, 1991)
- "Invisibility is an unnatural disaster: Reflections of an Asian American Woman" (This Bridge Called My Back: Radical Writings by women of color) ed. Cherrie L. Moraga/ Gloria E. Anzaldua
- "Cultural Influences: Asian/Pacific American" (Women Poets of the World)
- "Cincinnati" (Bold Words: A century of Asian American writing) ed. Rajini Srikanth and Esther Y. Iwanaga
- "Looking Out" (New Worlds of Literature) ed. Jerome Beaty/J. Paul Hunter
- "To the Lady" (Literature: Thinking, Reading and Writing Critically) ed. Sylvan Barnet, Morton Berman, William Burto, William E. Cain
- "Cincinnati, 1943" (Sing, whisper, shout, PRAY! Feminist Visions for a just world) ed. M, Jacqui Alexander, Lisa Albrecht, Sharon Day, Mab Segrest
- "Invisibility is an Unnatural disaster: reflections of an Asian American woman" (Constellations: A contextual reader for writers) ed. John Schilb, Elizabeth Flynn, John Clifford
- "Desert Run" (Making Face, Making Soul: Creative and Critical Perspectives by Women of Color) ed. Gloria Anzaldua
- "Marriage Was a Foreign Country" (Literature Alive! The Art of Oral Interpretation) ed. Teri gamble, Michael Gamble
- "Warning" (Making More Waves: New Writing by Asian American Women) ed. Elaine H Kim, Lilia V Villanueva, And Asian United of California
- "I learned to sew" (Southern California Women Writers and Artists) ed. Rara Avis
- "Mitsuye Yamada" (Yellow Light: The Flowering of Asian-American Artists) ed. Amy Ling
- "A Bedtime Story" (Arrangement in Literature) Medallion Edition/American Reads (textbook)
- "Masks of Women" (On Women Turning 70) interviews by Cathleen Rountree
- "She Often Spoke of Suicide" (My Story's On: Ordinary Women Extrodinary Lives) ed. Paula Ross
- "Legacy of Silence" (Last Witnesses Reflection on the Wartime Internment of Japanese Americans) ed. Erica Harth
- (Textbook but highlights teaching career) "Experiential Approaches to teaching Joy Kogawa's Obasan" (Teaching American Ethnic Literatures" ed. John R Maitino and David R Peck
- "Living in a Transformed Desert" (Placing the academy: Essays on landscape, work, and identity) ed. Jennifer Sinor and Rona Kaufman

== Awards ==
- 1980 - Receives Orange County Arts Alliance Literary Arts Award.
- 1982 - Receives Vesta Award for Writing, Woman's Building of Los Angeles.
- 1983 - Serves as Resource Scholar, Multicultural Women's Institute, University of Chicago.
- 1984 - Receives Writer's Fellowship, Yaddo Artist Colony, Saratoga Springs, New York.

Receives Award for Contribution to the Status of Women from the organization Women For: Orange County.

- 1985 - Receives Women's Network Alert Literature Award.
- 1987 - Visiting Poet, Pitzer College, Claremont, California.

Receives Distinguished Teacher Award from North Orange County Community College District Receives award for contributions to ethnic studies from MELUS.

- 1990-1991 - Receives Woman of Achievement Award from the Santiago Ranch Foundation.
- 1992 - Receives the Jesse Bernard Wise Women Award from the Center for Women's Policy Studies, Washington, D.C.

Commencement speaker at CSU Northridge.

- 1995 - Receives "Write On, Women!" award from the Southern California Library for Social Studies and Research.
- 1997 - Receives Give Women Voice Award—during International Women's Day, U.S.A.
- 2007 - KCET Local Hero of the Year for Asian Pacific American Heritage Month
- 2009 - Receives Honorary Doctorate, Simmons College Boston

== Boards ==
Yamada served on the national board of Amnesty International for two terms.
