= Siner =

Siner may refer to:

== Places ==
- Siner, Chuvash Republic, a village in the Chuvash Republic, Russia
- Siner, Republic of Tatarstan, a settlement in the Republic of Tatarstan, Russia

== People ==
- Guy Siner (born 1947), English actor
- Hosea Siner (1885–1948), American baseball player

== See also ==
- Sine (disambiguation)
- Sinner (disambiguation)
- Signer (disambiguation)
- Siné, French political cartoonist
- Sinar (disambiguation)
- Sinor (disambiguation)
