= Signs of the Time (disambiguation) =

Signs of the Time is a 2005 album by Mob Rules.

Signs of the Time may also refer to:

- Signs of the Time (film), a documentary on the origin of hand signals in baseball
- Signs of the Time, a 2008 album by With Increase
- "Signs of the Time", track on 1987 Just as I Am (Yolanda Adams album)

== See also ==
- Sign of the Times (disambiguation)
