= Signes =

Signes may refer to:

- "Signes" (song), a 2005 single by Nâdiya
- Signes, Var, a commune in the Var department in France
- Signes, a corner on the Circuit Paul Ricard

== See also ==
- Signs (disambiguation)
