= German Design Award =

Official design award for Germany

Design Award of the Federal Republic of Germany
- Native name: Designpreis der Bundesrepublik Deutschland
- Description: The official design award for Germany (Inactive since 2014)
- Country: Germany
- Presented by: Federal Ministry for Economic Affairs and Climate Action
- Website: http://www.bundesdesignpreis.de/

The Design Award of the Federal Republic of Germany (German: Designpreis der Bundesrepublik Deutschland) is the official design award for Germany presented by the German Ministry for Economics and Technology. The award was given for the first time under the name 'Federal Award for Good Design' in 1969 and thereafter every two years. Moreover, the focus of the award was changed on each occasion. The name of the award was first changed in 1992. Thereafter, the Federal Product Design Award and the Federal Award Promoter of Design — which went to a personality for achievements in the design field — were presented annually. Since 2006, it has been called the Design Award of the Federal Republic of Germany and is given for outstanding achievements in the fields of product and communication design, and to a personality in the design sector. Since 2012, the prize competition has been administered by DMY Berlin GmbH & Co. KG.

A company can only enter the competition for the Design Award if its product has already been awarded a national or international design prize. Another precondition for entry is that companies must have been nominated by the Ministries and Senators of the Federal States or by the Federal Ministry of Economics and Technology.

== Modalities, history and criticism ==
Participants were nominated for it by the Federal Ministry of Economics and Technology or the relevant state ministries - and only if they had previously won another national or international design award. This is why the award was also called "the prize of prizes". It was not possible to apply for the prize oneself.

The award was decided by an independent and expert jury of ten members. It was made up of representatives from industry, academia, design and the media. It was appointed for a period of four years by the Federal Minister of Economics and Technology.

Like many other design prizes, this one did not entail any prize money for the participants; on the contrary, it was fee-based. The prize was therefore criticized by the professional public from 2006 onwards, triggered by an open letter from the nominated designer Juli Gudehus.

The organization of the prize was carried out by the German Design Council until 2011 and was entrusted for the first time in a new tender in 2012 to a young small private company, DMY Berlin GmbH & Co. KG, was entrusted with the task. Since then, the German Design Council has announced its own design prize, which was briefly called the "Designpreis Deutschland", and then renamed the German Design Award.

When the organization of the Design Award of the Federal Republic of Germany was transferred to the organizer DMY Berlin, the payment modalities changed: Companies or designers paid a participation fee as before; however, they no longer had to pay a "winner's fee." Young designers did have to pay an entry fee of €350 per submission, but the Young Designer Award had been endowed with €8000 since 2012.

Since the insolvency of the last organizer in 2014, the prize has not been offered again.

== Award winner ==
=== 2014 (selection) ===
- Karl Clauss Dietel for his life's work
- Yang Liu for the wayfinding system Albertinum Dresden (Gold)
- Graft (silver)
- oup kommunikation for "Diagrimme - 12 Children's and Household Tales by the Brothers Grimm as Infographics" (Silver)

=== 2013 (selection) ===
- Uwe Loesch for his life's work

=== 2012 (selection gold) ===
- Wolfgang Joop for his life's work
- Johannes Bergerhausen and Siri Poarangan (Gold) for the publication "decodeunicode - The characters of the world", Schmidt, Mainz
- The Electric Hotel (Gold)
- Frackenpohl Poulheim, Heimplanet (Gold): The Cave

=== 2011 (selection) ===
- Erik Spiekermann for his life's work
- Sebastian Herkner as best newcomer
- Runge GmbH & Co. KG (silver) for Theatrum, a new type of youth bench for public outdoor spaces (without a classic seat) by the Runge Design Team

=== 2010 (selection) ===
- Bulthaup (Gold) for bulthaup b2 kitchen
- Joachim Sauter (Gold) for the BMW Group kinetic sculpture
- Nils Frederking (Silver) for the folding table F2, produced by Ligne Roset
- 2010 Honorary Award for Ingo Maurer as "Designer Personality
- For the first time in 2010, an endowed Young Designers Award was also presented. The winner was the Berlin textile designer Elisa Strozyk.
- Festo for the Air Jelly bionics project.

=== 2009 (selection) ===
- IDEO (Gold) for the electricity saving meter from Yello Strom
- IDEO (Silver) for the MY_WAY printer from Olivetti
- Honorary Award 2009 for Richard Sapper as "Designer Personality"

=== 2008 (selection) ===
- Otto Bock HealthCare for Genu Arexa knee orthosis (gold) by Ora-Ito Paris and Christian Lehmann, Zurich
- BMW Group for BMW G650 Xcountry by BMW Group Design
- Daimler Immobilien GmbH for Mercedes-Benz Museum Stuttgart by hg merz architekten museumsgestalter stuttgart berlin
- ERCO Leuchten GmbH for the Grasshopper by Werksdesign/Inhouse: Alois Dworschak & Henk Kosche
- Mammut Sports Group AG for the climbing carabiner "Bionic" by Nose AG, Christian Harbeke
- Robert Bosch Hausgeräte GmbH for HBN 77 P750 by Werksdesign/Inhouse: Roland Vetter
- WMF AG for Nomos by Metz & Kindler product design.
- Honorary award 2008 for Manfred Lamy as "designer personality"

=== 2007 (selection) ===
- Loewe AG for the LCD television Individual 32, Phoenix Design
- Deutsche Bahn for the new house typeface DB Type, designed by Erik Spiekermann and Christian Schwartz
- Silver Medal Category Space: Florian Fischer for Kelten Römer Museum Manching

=== 2006 (selection) ===
- Porsche 911 Carrera C2/C2S
- Rowenta M-Edition
- Impact drill D 25203K/D 25304K from Black & Decker GmbH

=== 2002 ===
- Audi AG for the Audi A2

=== 1985/86 ===
- Antoinette de Boer for the design of the fabric "Akaba"

=== 1977 ===
- Rosenthal AG for the "Fuga" drinking glass series; design: Elsa Fischer-Treyden

== See also ==
- List of design awards
- List of industrial designers
