= Signori =

Signori is a surname. Notable people with the name include:

- Céline Signori (born 1938), Canadian politician
- Francesco Signori (born 1988), Italian footballer
- Gabriela Signori (born 1960), a Swiss historian
- Giacomo Signori (1914–2005), Italian swimmer and water polo player
- Giuseppe Signori (born 1968), Italian footballer
