= Hazeka (recluse) =

Roman Catholic Saint

Saint Hazeka
- Residence: North Rhine-Westphalia, Germany
- Died: 1261
- Venerated in: Roman Catholic Church
- Feast: January 26

Hazeka (also Haseka, d. 1261) was a saint and a recluse in what is today North Rhine-Westphalia, Germany. She was attached to a church in Schermbeck, enclosed in a cell near the city's Cistercian monastery, for 36 years, living off alms supplied by the monastery and cared for by her minstra (servant) Bertha, a devout woman from one of the Rhenish provinces. Hazeka wore a Cistercian habit and lived under the Cistercian rule. According to Hazeka's hagiographer Hermann Greven, who wrote her biography based upon a 9th-century text by the Benedictine monk Usuard between 1450 and 1479, she lived a pious life and had an "inclination against human company". Historian Francesca M. Steele, who wrote biographies of Hazeka and other female recluses during the Middle Ages in Europe, stated that "Hazeka here passed her life in much simplicity and great patience, spending her days in prayer and work, most likely embroidery for the monastery".

Hazeka is best known for one miracle, which scholar Gabriela Signori calls "remarkably unremarkable": changing rancid butter into freshly-churned butter. Greven reports that she was "very close" to her servant Bertha, who cared for her goods and ate with her at the same table. Laura Moncion, who translated Greven's biography of Hazeka, states that both Berta and the nameless widow to whom Hazeka appears after her death "suggest a rich landscape of non-cloistered religious women, existing alongside recluses and monasteries in this period". Steele states, about this incident: "There is something very natural in the indignation of the old servant at their labour being rewarded with rank butter, and we are told also that Hareka worked as hard as possible, so that Sister Bertha’s anger was excusable, especially as she probably had shared Hazeka’s lot out of devotion to her rather than because she was herself attracted to it". Cookbook author Jennifer McLagan, who relates the miracle, calls Hazeka "the patron saint of butter".

Greven relates a conflict between monasteries over the right to intern her body; she was eventually buried, after the bishop intervened, at the Cistercian monastery. After she was buried, she appeared to a widow in her sleep and promised that the widow's prayers to her would be answered. Hagiographer Agnes B.C. Dunbar reported that "miracles attended her burial". Greven predicted Hazeka's popular veneration; Steele stated that Hazeka was revered by many people. Hazeka's feast day is January 26.

== Works cited ==
- Steele, Francesca Maria (1903). Anchoresses of the West. London: Sands & Company.
