= SINE =

SINE can refer to:

- Short interspersed nuclear elements, a type of retrotransposon in DNA
- Selective inhibitors of nuclear export, a type of candidate cancer drug

== See also ==
- Sine (disambiguation)
