= Juli Gudehus =

German graphic designer

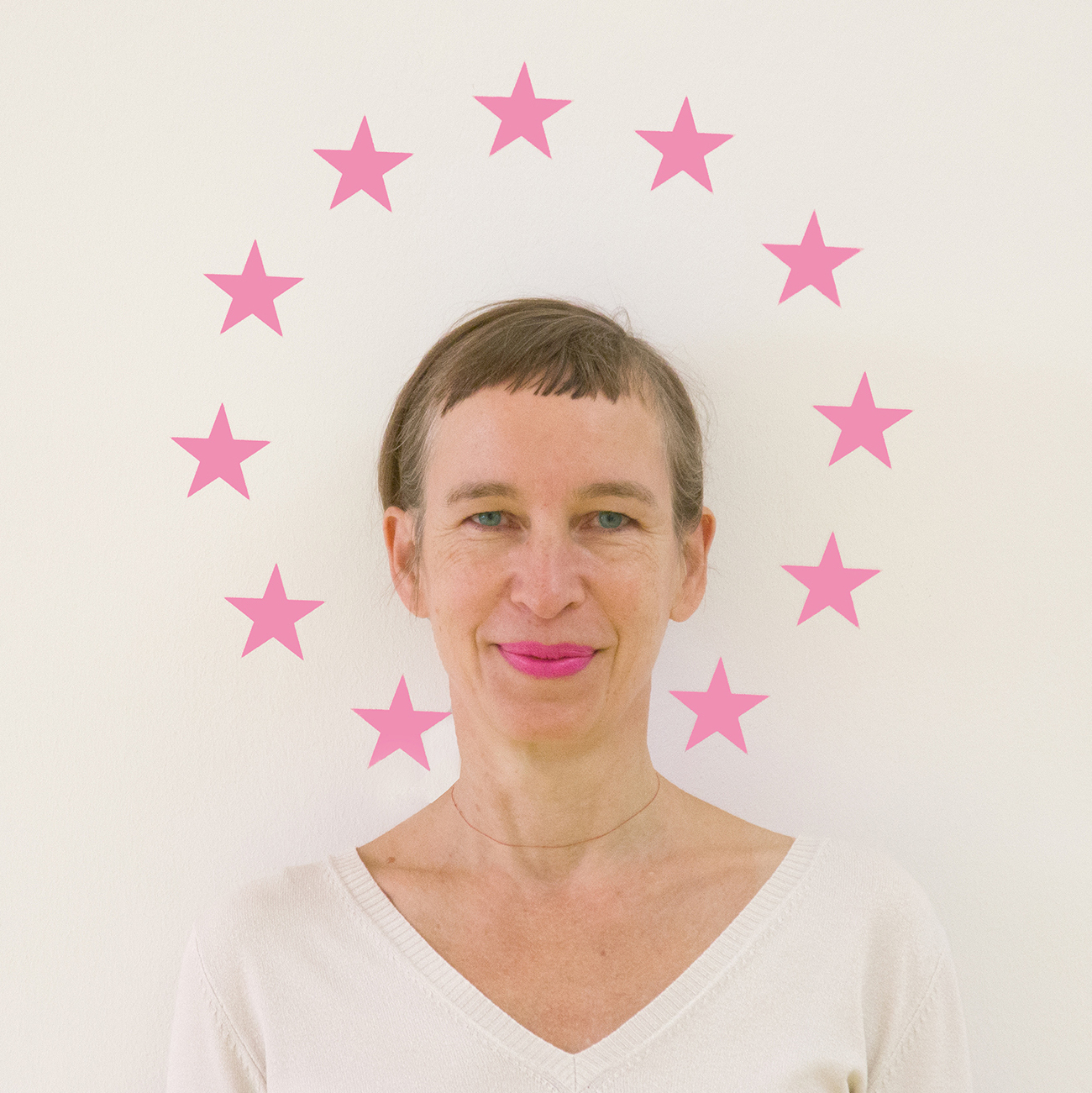
- Juli Gudehus, 2019
- Born: 1968 (age 57–58); Hamburg, Federal Republic of Germany
- Occupation: artist
- Known for: translation of the biblical creation story into a contemporary adaptation of the Egyptian hieroglyphs
- Parents: Timm Gudehus (father); Sö Gudehus (mother)

Juli Gudehus (born 1968) is a German artist. Her work is based on collecting, sorting and collaging. Juli Gudehus establishes connections between phenomenons, people, and things. Language and everyday culture are sources for her work.

== Life ==
Gudehus was born in Hamburg as the daughter of the manager and logistician Timm Gudehus and the artist Sö Gudehus. After training as a publishing bookseller at the art book publisher Wienand in Cologne, Juli Gudehus studied visual communication in Düsseldorf, from 1990 to 1996. She has been a freelance artist since 1996.

Juli Gudehus is best known for her translation of the biblical creation story into a contemporary adaptation of the Egyptian hieroglyphs, using pictograms, symbols, logos, and many other signs. A first full-page nationwide publication of her »Genesis« in the German newspaper Die Zeit on January, 1st, 1993 was followed by imprints in newspapers, magazines, and books until today. It was and is exhibited, both nationally and internationally, and has seen four book editions. With her Icon spell project, Juli Gudehus takes the idea of a visual global language that lines up icons one step further.

Her tear-off calendar „mindestens haltbar bis” (“best before ...”) was published in 1998. All 365 sheets show expiry dates of food, such as milk, biscuits, vinegar or flour.

2010 saw the publication of the Lesikon der visuellen Kommunikation, a 3000-page text collage. The book covers numerous areas of visual communication and brings together entries by 3513 people from over 3000 years on 9704 terms and names. The terms are not arranged alphabetically, but according to topics such as gardening, sex, mountaineering, and death. Gudehus herself, as well as 627 people invited by her, wrote contributions. About 70 per cent of the texts are quotations. There are usually several entries per term. The Lesikon does not contain a single illustration.

In 2020, on the occasion of the increased attention for toilet paper in connection with the COVID-19 pandemic, Juli Gudehus started a lecture series on YouTube about design for ass, in which she gives insight into her toilet paper collection of over 1,800 sheets, episode by episode, and talks about various design, manufacturing and sociological aspects.
