= The Sign =

The Sign can refer to:

- The Sign (Ace of Base album), an alternate name for the Ace of Base album Happy Nation
  - "The Sign" (song), a 1993 hit from this album
- The Sign (Crystal Lake album), the third studio album by Japanese metalcore band Crystal Lake, or its title track
- "The Sign" (Bluey), an episode of the Australian animated TV series Bluey
- "The Sign" (Agents of S.H.I.E.L.D.), an episode of the American TV series Agents of S.H.I.E.L.D.
- "The Sign", a song by Lizzo from her fourth studio album Special

== See also ==
- Sign (disambiguation)
