= Bulthaup =

German kitchen furniture manufacturer in Aich district of Bodenkirchen

Bulthaup GmbH & Co. KG
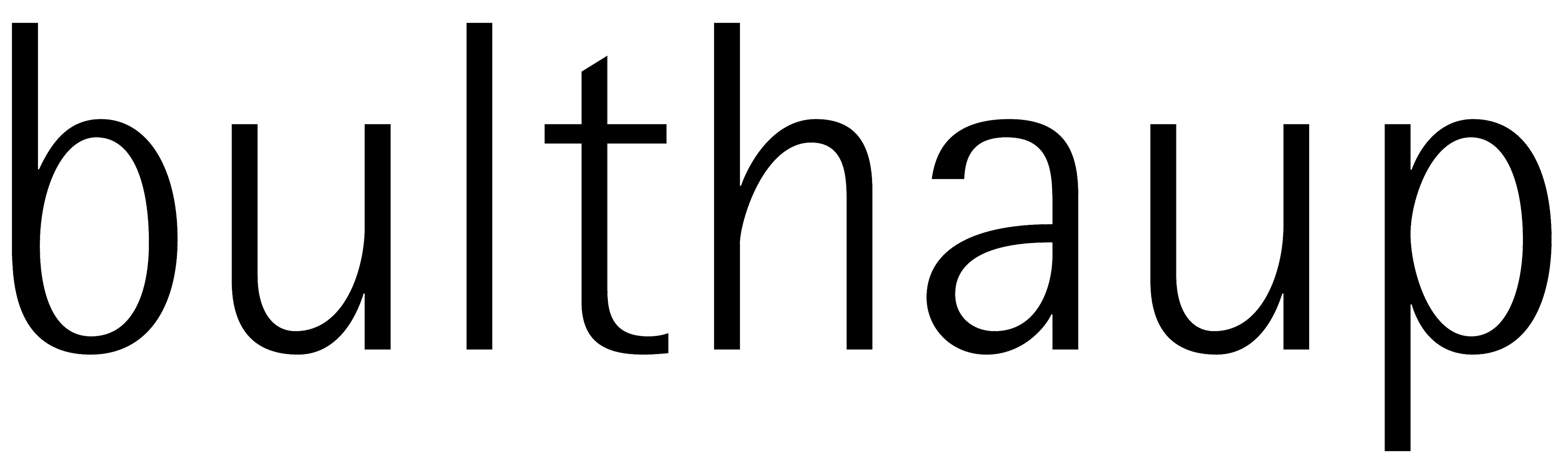
- Company type: Kommanditgesellschaft
- Founded: 1949
- Founder: Martin Bulthaup
- Headquarters: Aich, Bodenkirchen, Germany
- Key people: Marc O. Eckert: President & CEO
- Products: Kitchen furniture and accessories
- Revenue: 103.8 million € (2023)
- Number of employees: 542 (2023)
- Website: http://www.bulthaup.com

Bulthaup GmbH & Co. KG (stylised as bulthaup) is a German kitchen furniture manufacturer based in Aich, a district of Bodenkirchen near Landshut. The company is family-run in third generation and as of 2023 records revenues of over 100 million euros – over 83% of which is accounted for by exports.

== Corporate history ==
=== Early years ===
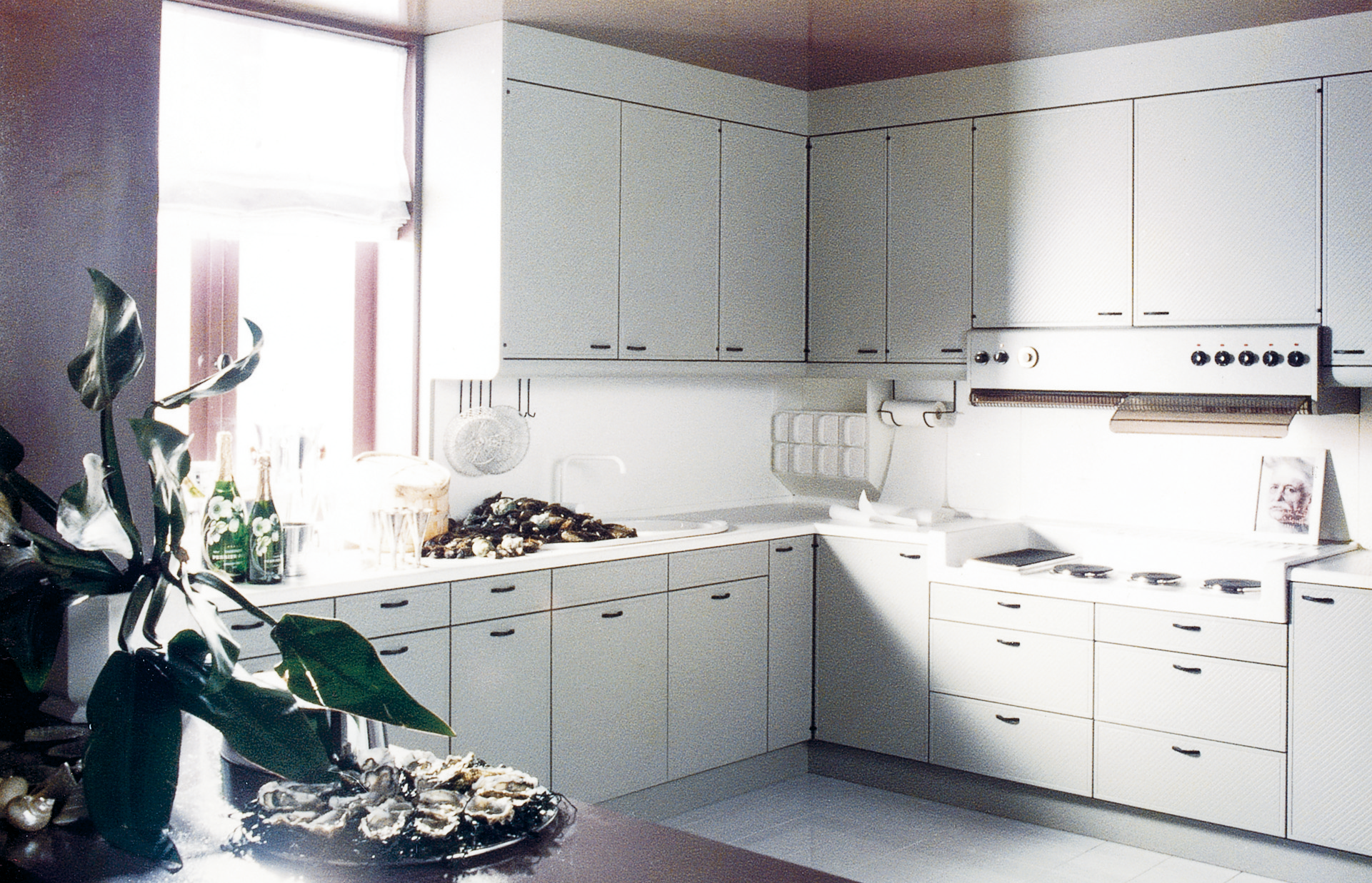
Bulthaup Concept 12 (1974)

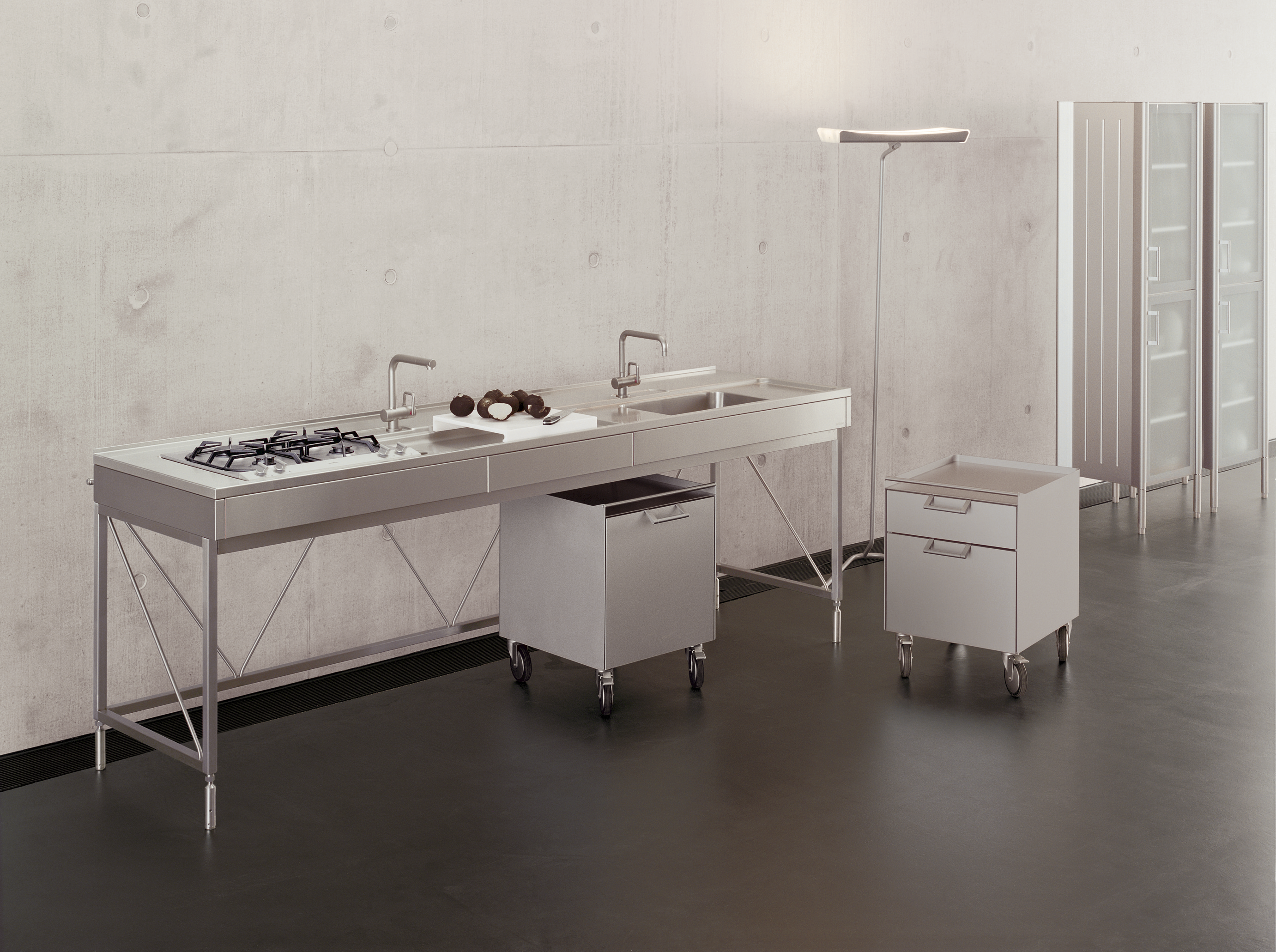
Bulthaup Kitchen Workbench (1988) and Bulthaup System 20 furniture

Martin Bulthaup, originally from East Westphalia, established the "Martin Bulthaup Möbelfabrik" (Martin Bulthaup furniture factory) in Bodenkirchen near Landshut in 1949. In 1951, he and his then seven employees commenced the production of kitchen furniture. The first product was a kitchen buffet with hand-sewn curtains. In 1953, he constructed a plant in Bodenkirchen, which was expanded in 1963 to include an office building and an additional production facility. At the same time, he introduced assembly-line production into the company's operations. In 1969, Bulthaup presented the Stil 75 product line.

With an annual turnover of approximately one hundred million Deutschmarks, the company ranked among the five largest German manufacturers of kitchen furniture by the late 1960s. In 1972, Bulthaup constructed a 40,000-square-metre production plant in Bodenkirchen-Aich, and in 1973 began exporting to the member states of the then European Economic Community (EEC). In 1974, the company introduced the Concept 12 (C12) kitchen system, which allowed for flexible planning utilitzing a 12-centimetre grid.

In 1976, the founder's son, Gerd Bulthaup (1944–2019), together with his twin sister, Ingeborg Eckert, entered the company. In 1979, Gerd Bulthaup assumed management of the business and consolidated various divisions within the new production facility at Bodenkirchen-Aich.

=== Collaboration with Otl Aicher ===
In 1980, Bulthaup began working with Otl Aicher, one of the founders of the Ulm School of Design. According to Aicher, kitchens should invite people to prepare meals together and kitchen tools should be kept within easy reach and visibly stored. In 1982, he published the book “Die Küche zum Kochen”. In the same year, Bulthaup launched the kitchen furniture program system b, which was inspired by Aicher's studies. In 1988, the Kitchen Workbench KWB followed, a combination of stainless steel cooking area, sink, and work surface that adopted design elements from professional kitchens. It was awarded several design prizes.

=== 1990s ===
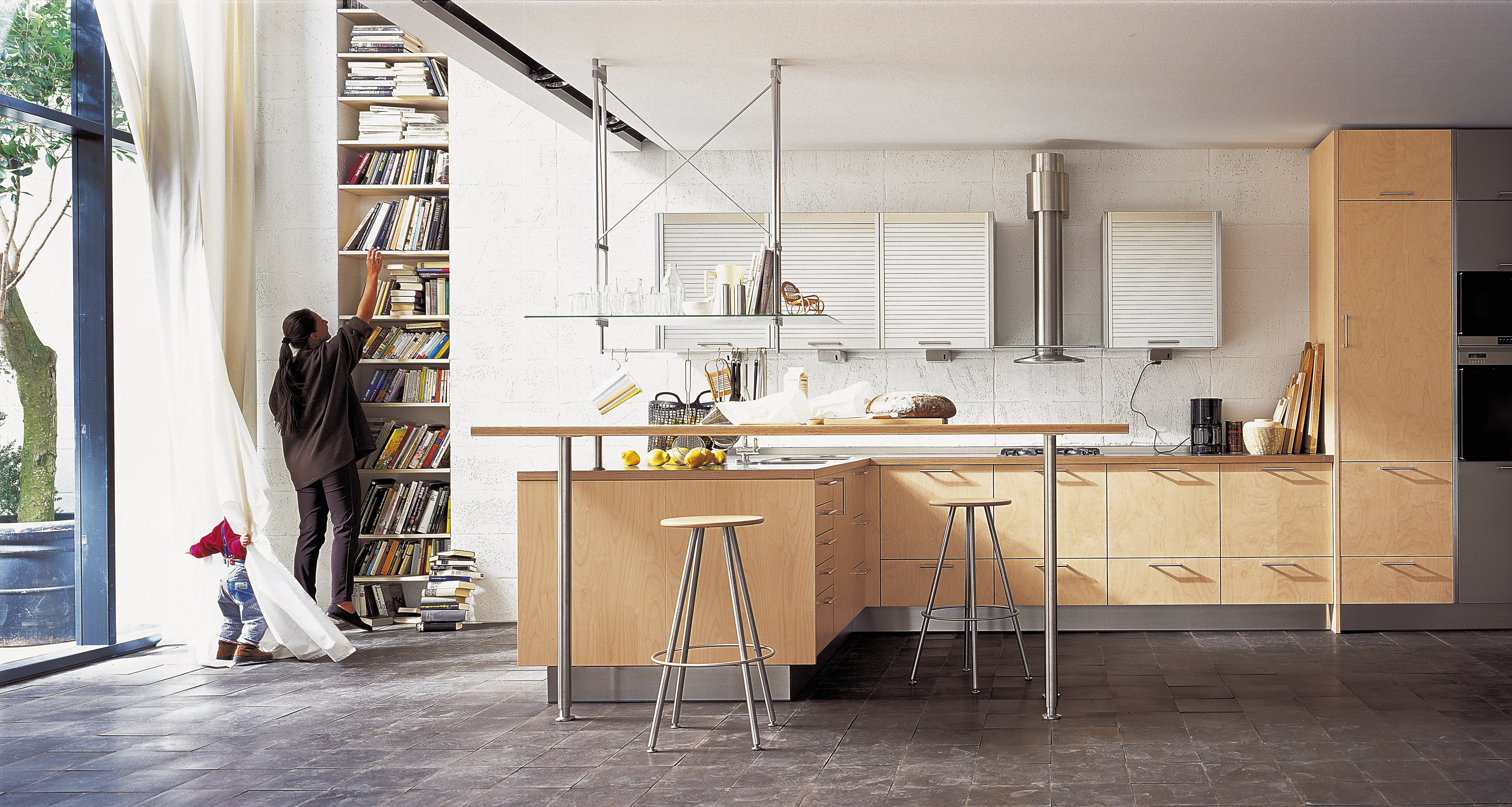
Bulthaup System 25 with Bulthaup exhaust hood und Duktus furniture (1992)

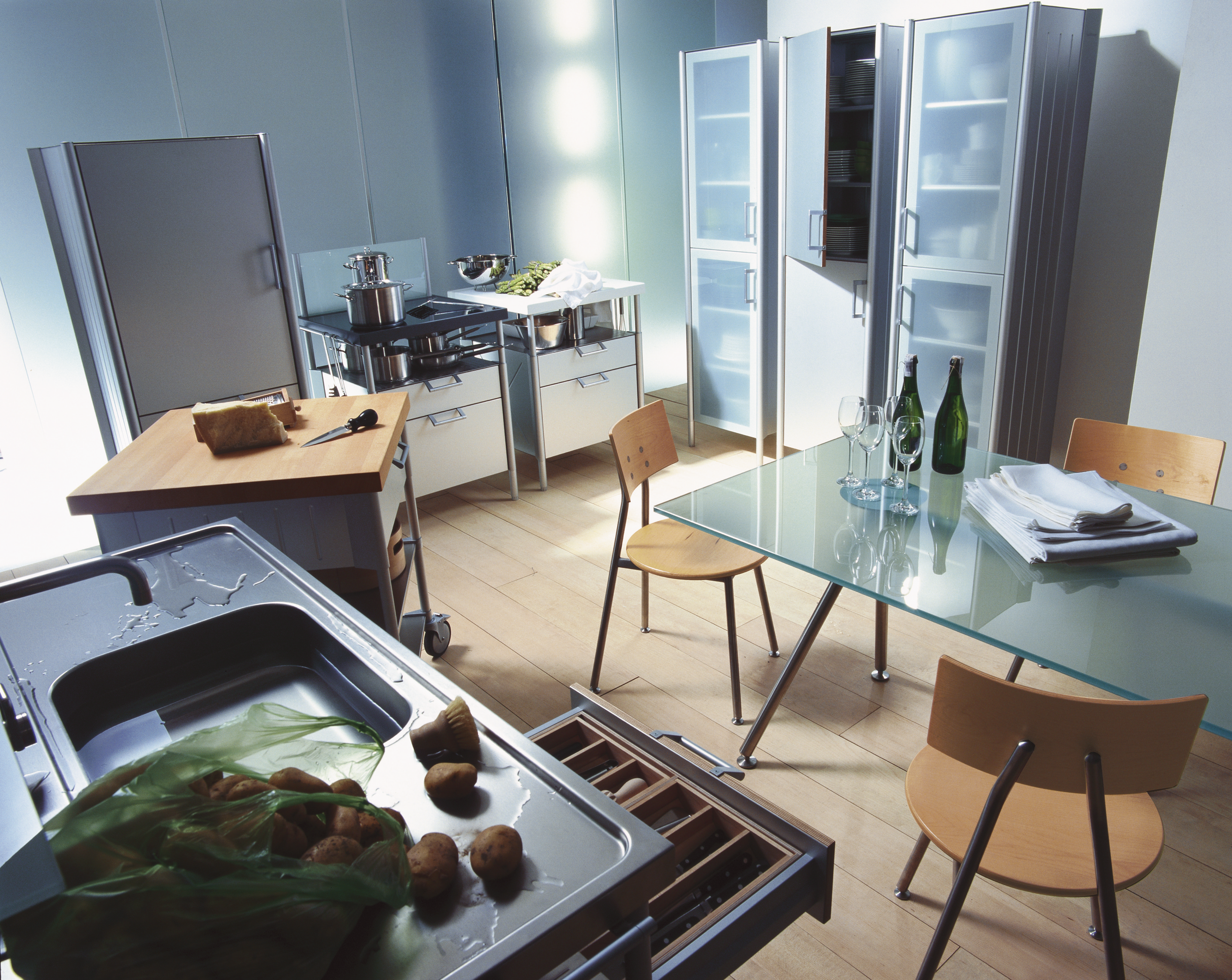
Bulthaup System 20 (1997)

1992 the company introduced the System 25. Its modular structure and diverse components enabled flexible kitchen designs. The name System 25 was derived from the 3D 25 × 25 × 25 mm grid the range was based on. Items that needed to be particularly hard-wearing could be produced using stainless steel, combined with glass, wood, or laminate surfaces. The new Bulthaup extractor, whose form and function were based on those used in professional kitchens, won several awards. During this period, Bulthaup also developed and launched Korpus and Duktus seating. In 1997, Bulthaup launched the mobile System 20, with its wheeled containers and freely moveable elements. Each item could be combined as the customer wished and placed anywhere in the room where there was an electricity and water supply.

=== 2000s ===
In 2003, Gerd Bulthaup stepped down from the day-to-day management of the company. For the next seven years, it was led by external managing directors. In 2004, Bulthaup launched the b3 kitchen line, working in collaboration with designer Herbert H. Schultes. In 2008, the company introduced the b2 concept, an open kitchen designed in the style of a workshop. At the end of 2009, Marc O. Eckert, the founder's grandson, rejoined the company's leadership, bringing a family member back into management. In 2010, he was appointed the company's sole managing director.

=== 2010s and 2020s ===
Due to the ongoing economic downturn, the company was forced in March 2010 to transfer 114 of its more than 550 employees to an employment and training company or to dismiss them. After a one-and-a-half-year period of short-time work had already come to an end, the employees were required to take up new employment following a nine-month retraining and support program.

In 2014, the new b Solitaire range was presented at the Milan trade fair. The line includes freestanding kitchen elements in a minimalist design.

In 2018, Bulthaup further developed a new kitchen concept, b.architecture, from its previous flagship system b3. It moved the focus away from the stove to the water and placing a greater emphasis on the preparation of cooking.

In the summer of 2023, the company opened its own steel and aluminum manufactory in Bodenkirchen.

In 2024, Bulthaup presented a new kitchen system at the Milan Furniture Fair, departing from the previously neutral and seamless construction and instead using solid materials such as wood and stainless steel. Susanne Maerzke wrote afterwards in the Küchen&Design Magazin that Bulthaup had completely transformed its product range, moving away from the minimal aesthetic towards a more "human" kitchen. In the process, the kitchen workbench from the 1980s was also reissued.

== Corporate structure ==
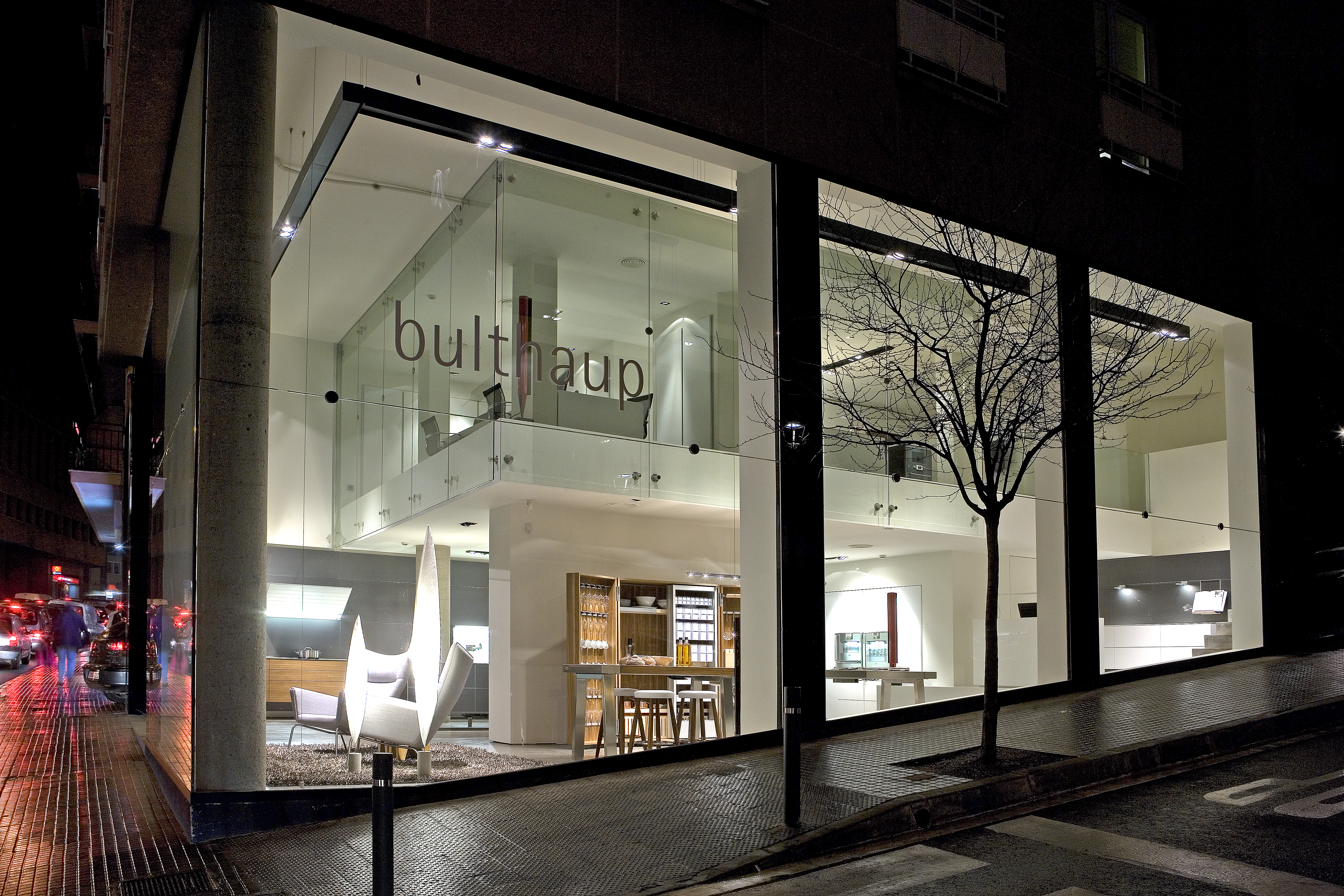
Bulthaup showroom (2014)

The Bulthaup GmbH & Co. KG is the parent company of the group. The managing director of Bulthaup is Marc Oliver Eckert. In 2023, the company generated revenues of approximately €103.8 million and employed 542 people. About 83 percent of this revenue was earned abroad. Bulthaup is a family-owned enterprise, with around 90 percent of its shares held by Marc Eckert.

Bulthaup operates its own stores and maintains 250 partner stores worldwide. The company also has subsidiaries abroad.

== Products ==
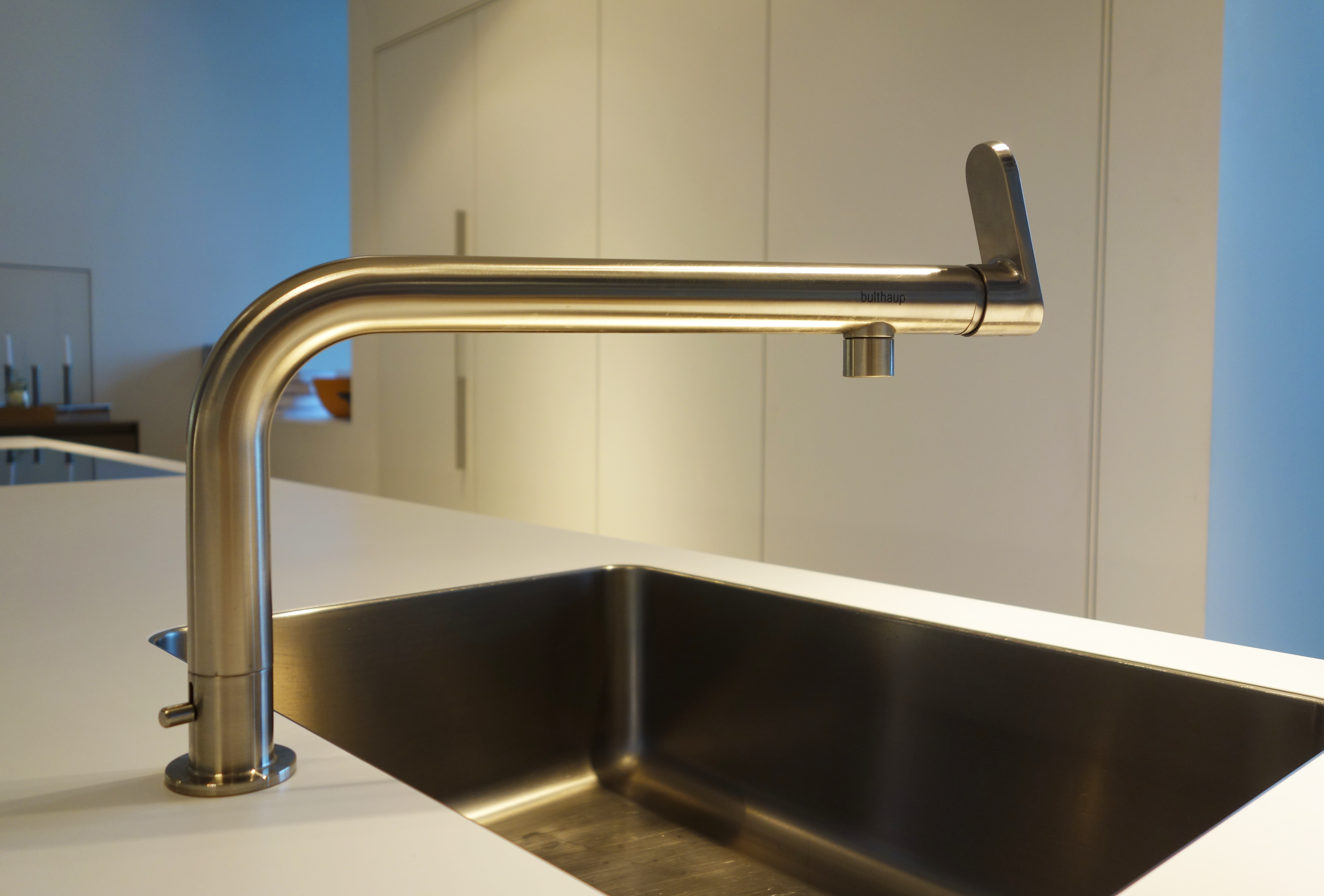
Bulthaup faucet (2014)

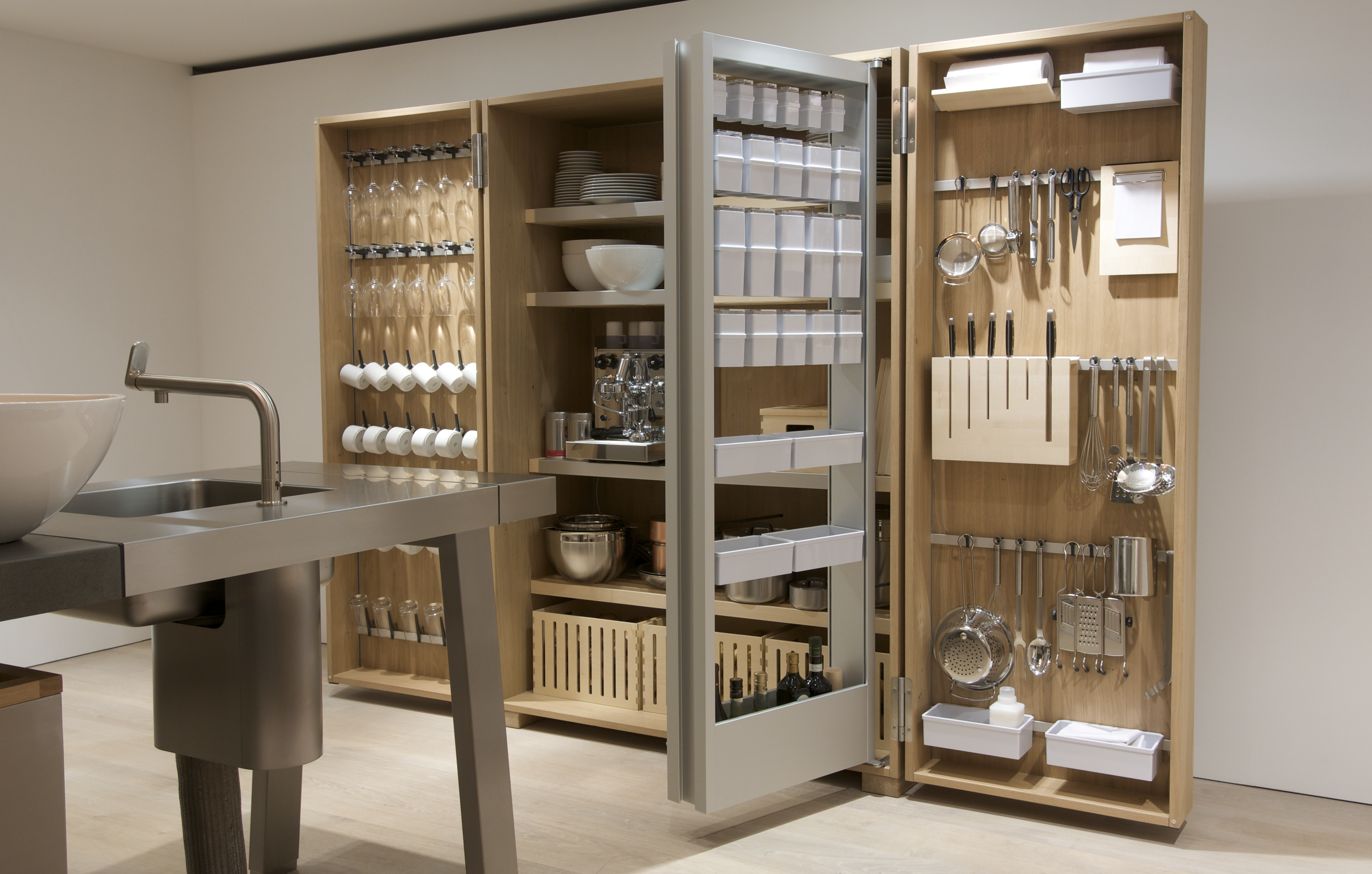
Bulthaup b2 kitchen (2014)

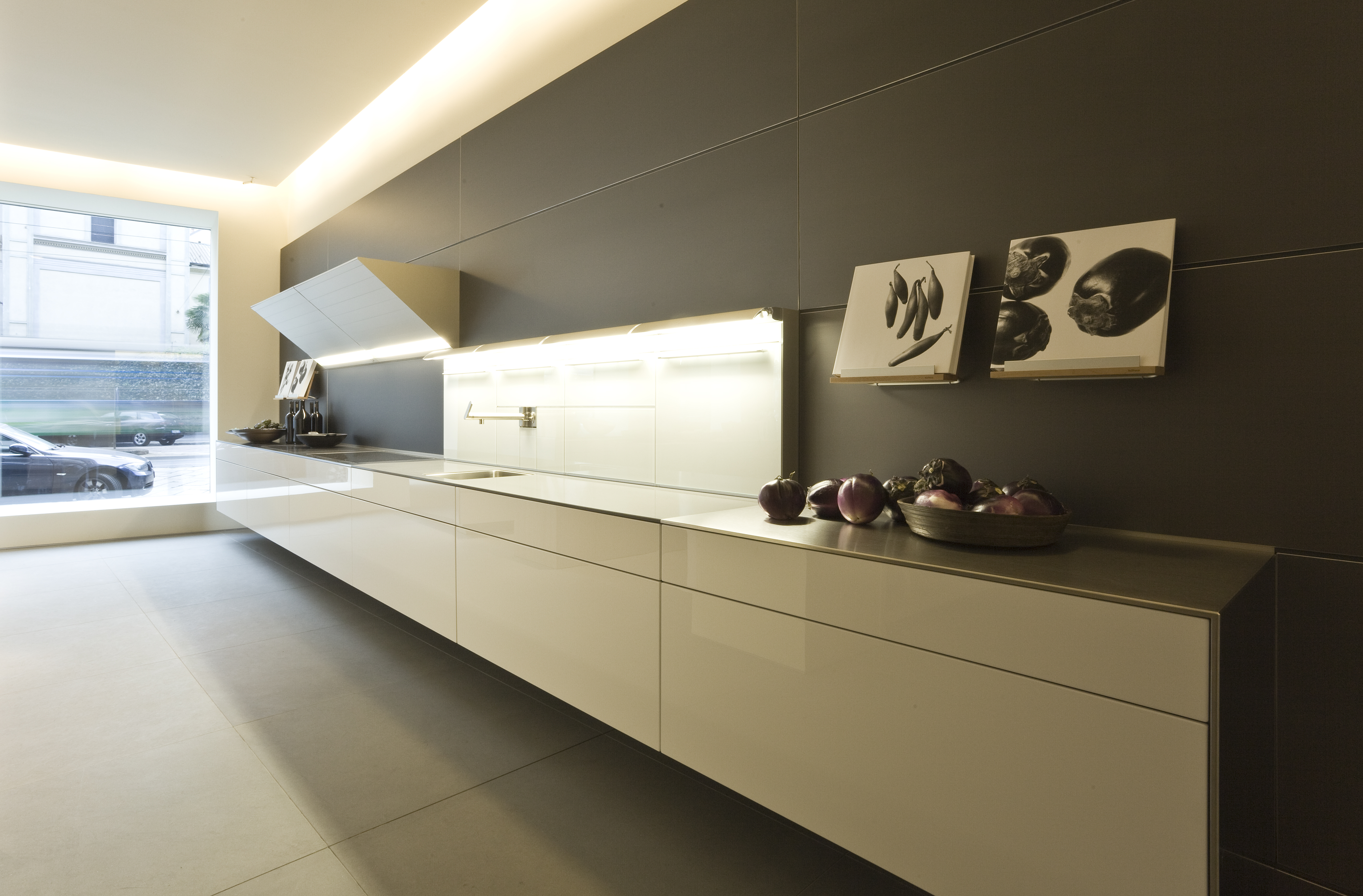
Bulthaup b3 kitchen (2014)

Bulthaup manufactures three different product lines: b Solitaire, b2 and b3.

Under the b Solitaire product line, Bulthaup produces products for the entire living space, which also extend beyond the kitchen.

The b2 product line is designed to combine all essential kitchen functions in one element. The kitchen is therefore reduced to the three central elements of workbench, work cabinet and tool cabinet. These are not dependent on static walls and can therefore be freely combined in the room. And the interior of the cabinets and the workbench both have a modular design.

Under the b3 product line, Bulthaup manufactures a multifunctional kitchen and room system that can be put together individually and changeably. Instead of the classic floor plan, this system includes a multifunctional wall that means that the living area and kitchen are no longer so separated from each other.

In addition, Bulthaup also offers kitchen accessories and utensils independently of the product lines.

Since 2024, the new line of kitchen furniture is made from solid materials such as solid wood and stainless steel. The range includes multiple furniture pieces, and instead of working with multiple lines as before, the new products are part of the "Bulthaup System". All accessories of the brand are designed to be hung on the metallic railing system of the furniture pieces. The induction and gas cooktops are produced by Bulthaup itself.

== Awards ==
- 1997: The European Commission presents Bulthaup with a Lifetime Achievement Award and the European Design Price
- 2003, 2006, 2012: IF Product Design Award
- 2010: The b2 system receives the German Design Award of the Federal Republic of Germany
- 2013: The rotary sliding door fitting 50 HA 120 DS 128 receives the German Design Award
- 2013: The full extension tall cabinet 53H45VZA receives the German Design Award
- 2013: Bulthaup's interior/ functional prisms receives the German Design Award
- 2013: The Bulthaup b3 receives the Good Design Award in the category kitchen/kitchen utensils from the Art Institute of Chicago
- 2013: Wallpaper Design Award
- 2014: Architects Partner Award in Gold from the AIT
- 2014: The German Design Council presents Bulthaup with the German Design Award in the category Personality

== Bibliography ==
- Aicher, Otl (2005). Die Küche zum Kochen: Werkstatt einer neuen Lebenskultur [The kitchen is for cooking: Workshop of a new culture of life] (unchanged new edition, 1st ed.), Staufen bei Freiburg: Ökobuch, ISBN 978-3-936896-18-3.
- Andritzky, Michael (1992). Oikos: von der Feuerstelle zur Mikrowelle, Haushalt und Wohnen im Wandel [Oikos – from the hearth to microwave. Household and living in transition] (in German) (1st ed.). Giessen: Anabas press. pp. 136 ff., ISBN 9783870381691.
- Krichbaum, Jörg (ed.): bulthaup system 25. In: German Standards. Products and Objects in Germany that stand out for the entirety. Names and terms from Aspirin to Zeiss in picture and word. 7th, extended edition. Cologne: Arcum press. 1995. p. 134, ISBN 978-3930912049.
