= Sign =

Entity whose presence indicates the probable existence of something else

Biohazard sign with a conventional symbol having no inherent relationship to what it represents

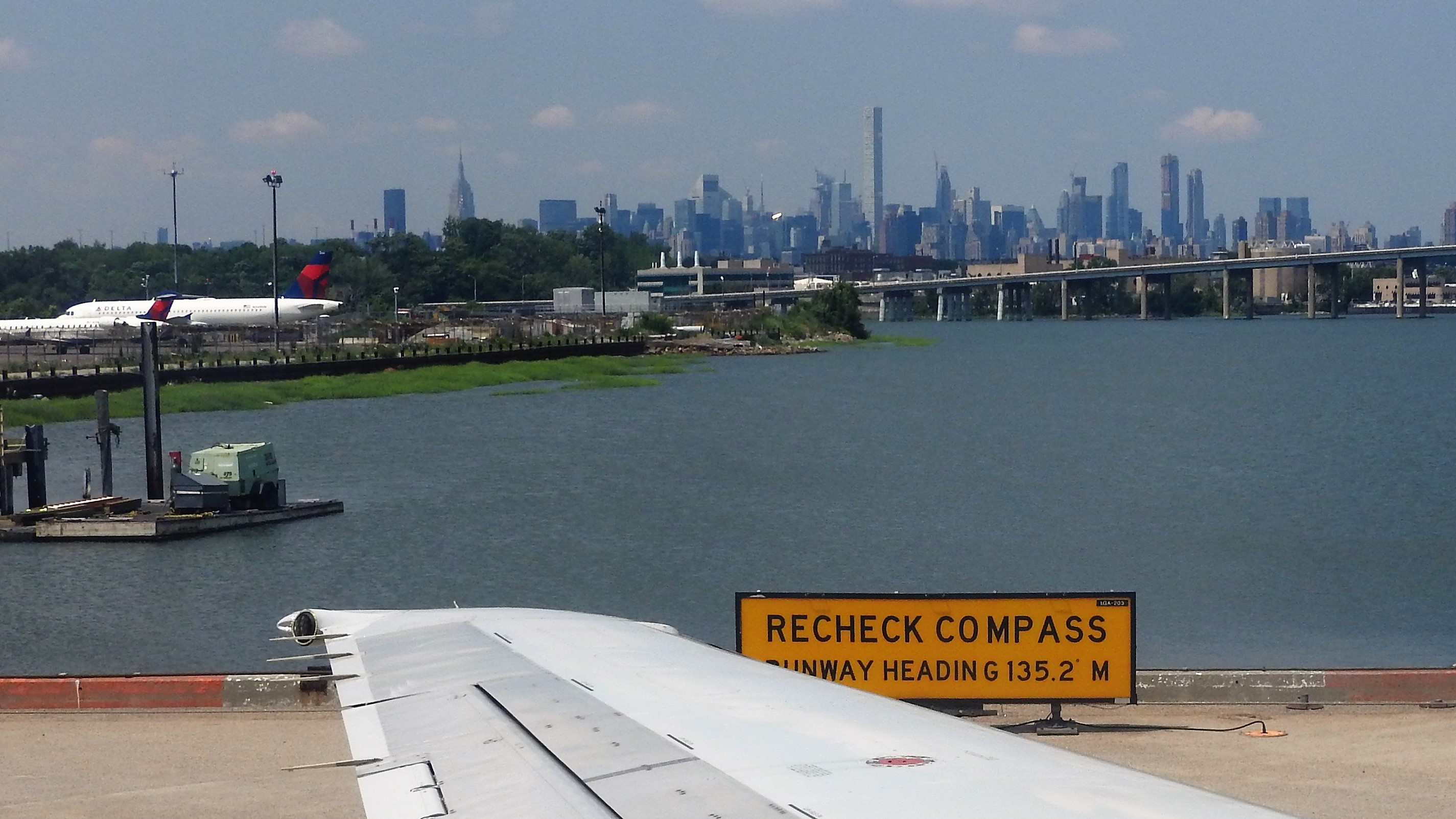
An airport sign at La Guardia Airport

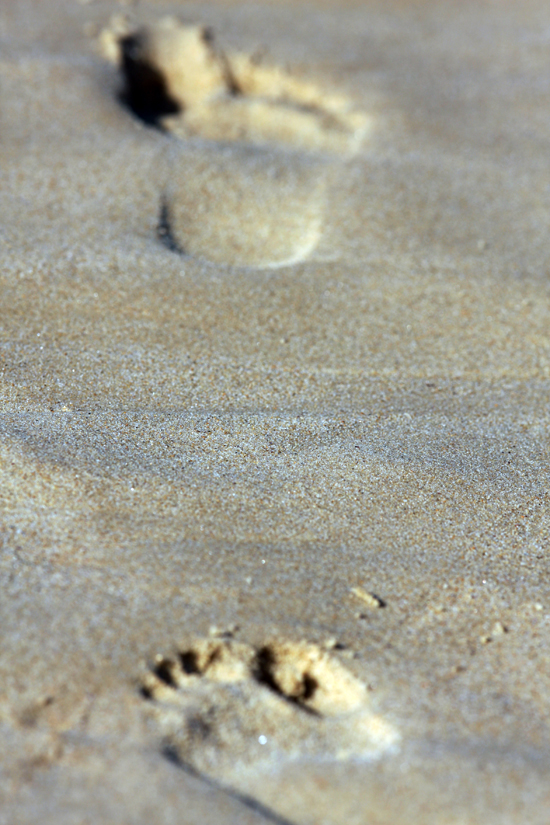
A natural sign in the environment indicating recent human activity

A sign is an object, quality, event, or entity whose presence or occurrence indicates the probable presence or occurrence of something else. A natural sign bears a causal relation to its object—for instance, thunder is a sign of storm, or medical symptoms a sign of disease. A conventional sign signifies by agreement, as a full stop signifies the end of a sentence; similarly the words and expressions of a language, which can be interpreted as bodily gestures, can be regarded as signs, expressing particular meanings. The physical objects most commonly referred to as signs (notices, road signs, etc., collectively known as signage) generally inform or instruct using written text, symbols, pictures or a combination of these.

The philosophical study of signs and symbols is called semiotics; this includes the study of semiosis, which is the way in which signs (in the semiotic sense) operate.

== Nature ==
Semiotics, epistemology, logic, and philosophy of language are concerned about the nature of signs, what they are and how they signify. The nature of signs and symbols and significations, their definition, elements, and types, is mainly established by Aristotle, Augustine, and Aquinas. According to these classic sources, significance is a relationship between two sorts of things: signs and the kinds of things they signify (intend, express or mean), where one term necessarily causes something else to come to the mind. Distinguishing natural signs and conventional signs, the traditional theory of signs (Augustine) sets the following threefold partition of things: all sorts of indications, evidences, symptoms, and physical signals, there are signs which are always signs (the entities of the mind as ideas and images, thoughts and feelings, constructs and intentions); and there are signs that have to get their signification (as linguistic entities and cultural symbols). So, while natural signs serve as the source of signification, the human mind is the agency through which signs signify naturally occurring things, such as objects, states, qualities, quantities, events, processes, or relationships. Human language and discourse, communication, philosophy, science, logic, mathematics, poetry, theology, and religion are only some of fields of human study and activity where grasping the nature of signs and symbols and patterns of signification may have a decisive value. Communication takes place without words but via the mind as a result of signs and symbols; They communicate/pass across/ messages to the human mind through their pictorial representation.

== Types ==
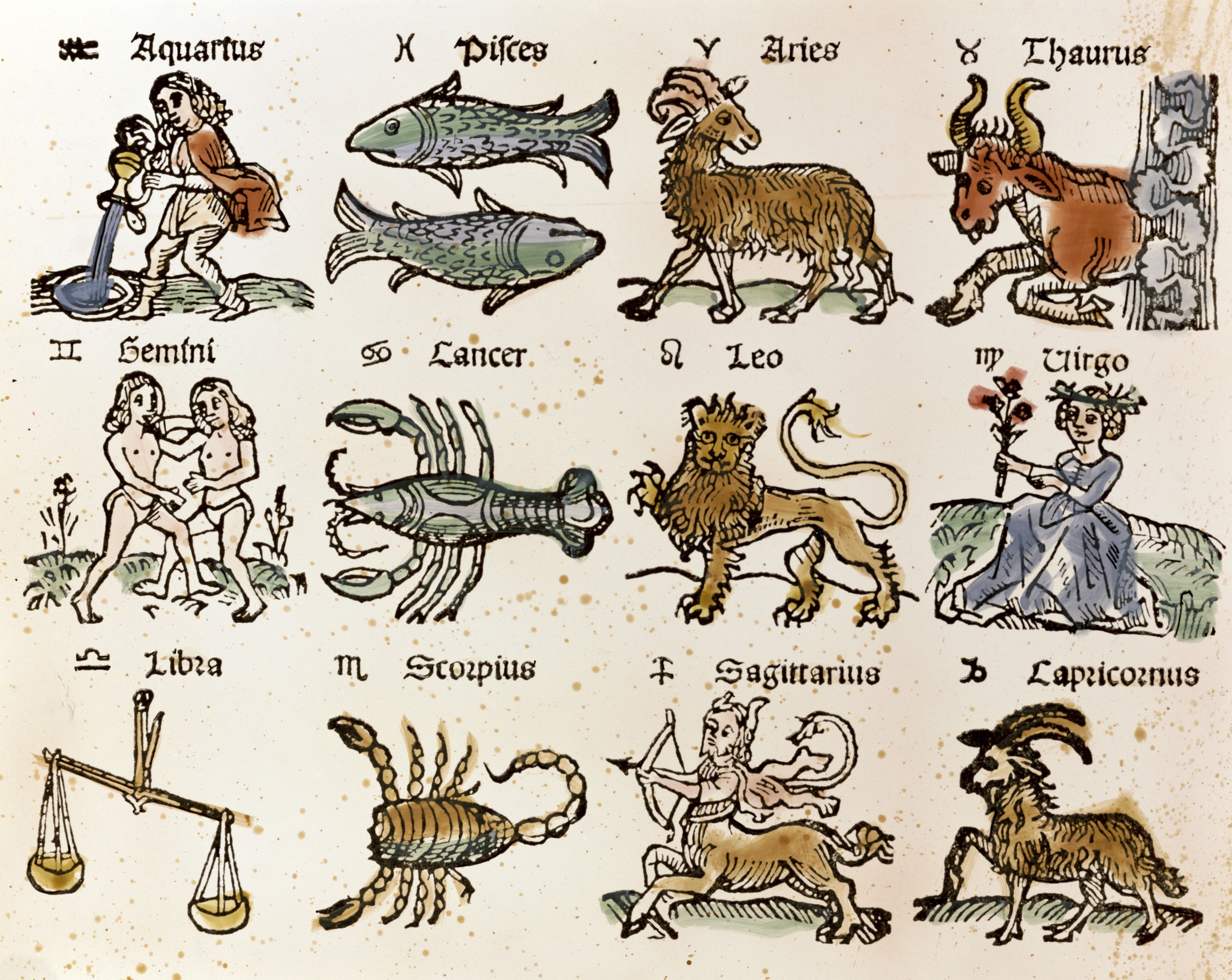
The western zodiac signs

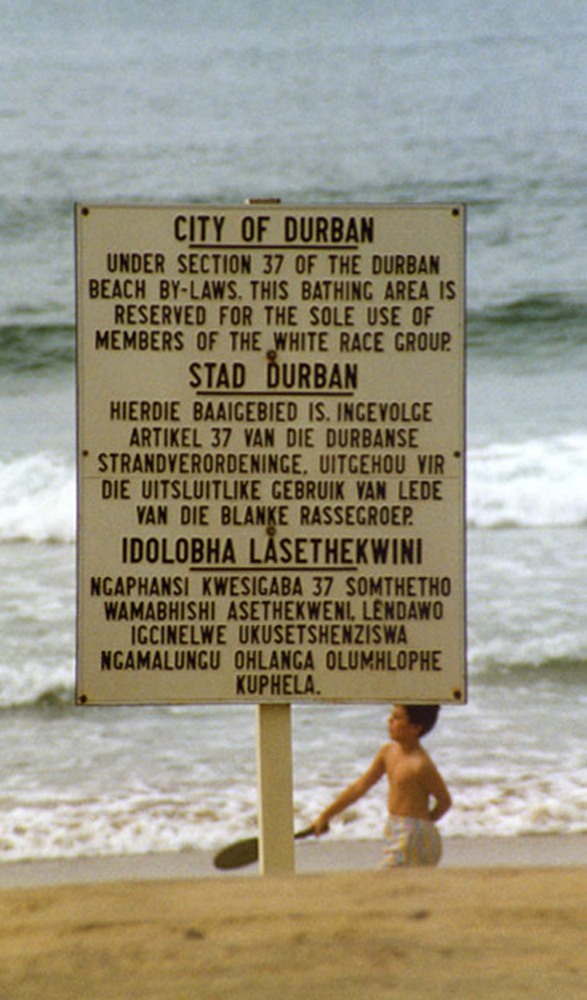
A signboard on a beach in Durban in apartheid-era South Africa indicates a racially segregated beach.

The word sign has a variety of meanings in English, including:

- Sun signs in astrology
- Sign or signing, in communication: communicating via hand gestures, such as in sign language.
- Gang signal
- Sign, in Tracking (hunting): also known as Spoor (animal); trace evidence left on the ground after passage.
- A signboard
- A sign, in common use, is an indication that a previously observed event is about to occur again
- Sign, in divination and religion: an omen, an event or occurrence believed to foretell the future
- Sign, in ontology and spirituality: a coincidence or surprising event thought to reveal divine will; see synchronicity
- Sign (linguistics): a combination of a concept and a sound-image described by Ferdinand de Saussure
- In mathematics, the sign of a number tells whether it is positive or negative. Also, the sign of a permutation tells whether it is the product of an even or odd number of transpositions.
- Signedness, in computing, is the property that a representation of a number has one bit, the sign bit, which denotes whether the number is non-negative or negative. A number is called signed if it contains a sign bit, otherwise unsigned. See also signed number representation
- Sign, in biology: an indication of some living thing's presence
- Medical sign, in medicine: objective evidence of the presence of a disease or disorder, as opposed to a symptom, which is subjective
- Sign (semiotics): the basic unit of meaning
- Information sign: a notice that instructs, advises, informs or warns people
- Traffic sign: a sign that instructs drivers; see also stop sign, speed limit sign, cross walk sign
- Sign, in a writing system: a basic unit. Similar terms which are more specific are character, letter or grapheme
- Commercial signage, including flashing signs, such as on a retail store, factory, or theatre
- Signature, in history: a handwritten depiction observed on a document to show authorship and will
- For marketing or advocacy purposes, a signage refers to the collective use of signs to convey a message.

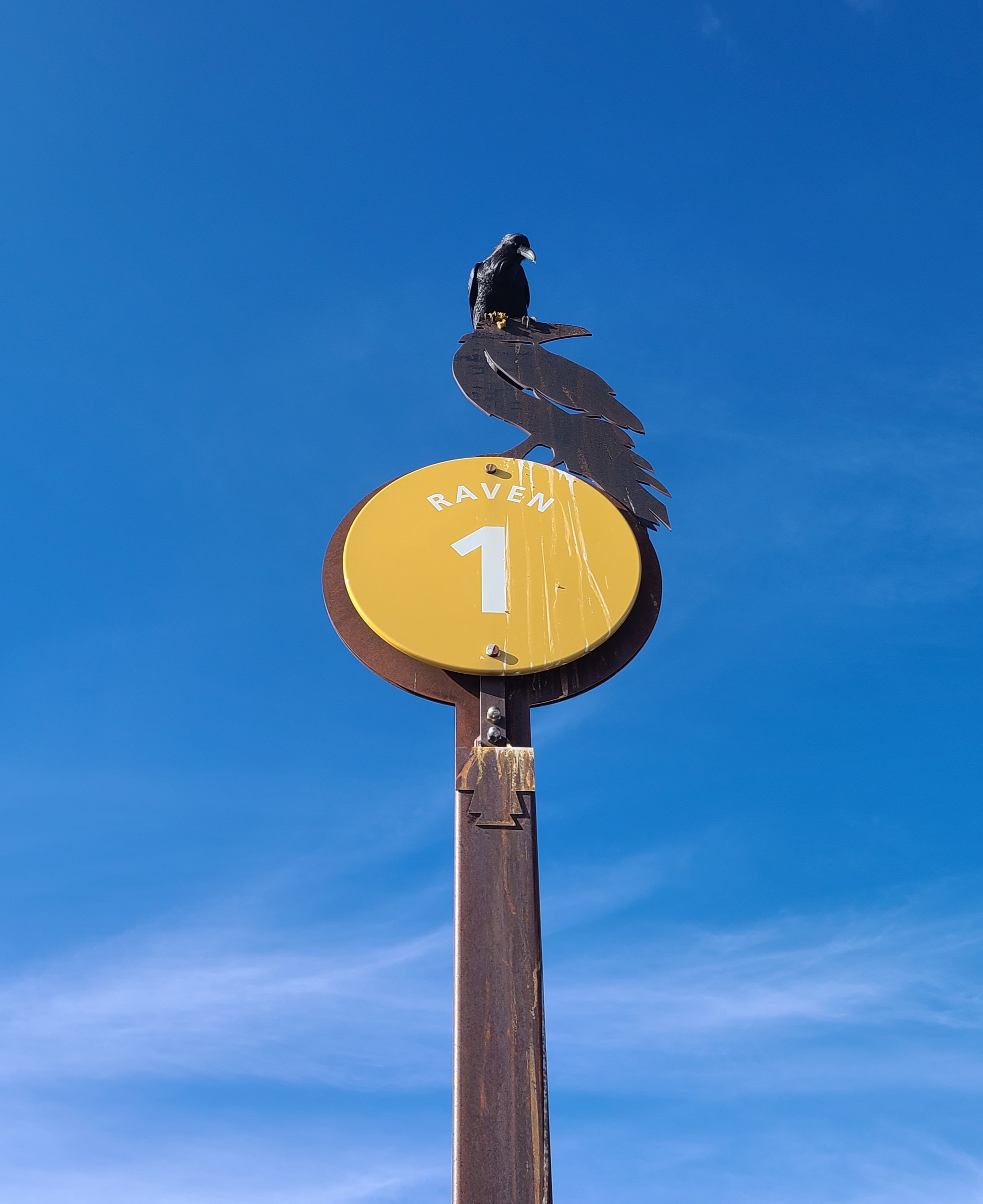
Raven sitting on a parking lot sign. A raven is a spiritual sign in many traditions.

== See also ==
- Asemic writing
- Roland Barthes
- Commercial signage
- Mary Douglas
- Semiotic theory of Charles Sanders Peirce
- Icon
- Icon (computing)
- Ideogram
- Interpretation of dreams
- Edmund Leach
- Claude Lévi-Strauss
- List of symbols
- Logotype
- Map-territory relation – view that an abstraction derived from something, or a reaction to it, is not the thing itself.
- Sorites paradox
- Theseus' paradox
- Identity of indiscernibles
- National symbol
- Neon sign
- Religious symbolism
- Representation
- Ferdinand de Saussure
- Semiotics
- Signing (disambiguation)
- Structuralism
- Symbol
- Synchronicity
- Traffic sign
- Universal language
