= Signify =

Signify or signifying may refer to:

- Signified and signifier, concepts in linguistics
- Signifyin', form of wordplay in African-American culture
- DJ Signify, American hip hop music producer
- Signify (album), a 1996 studio album by Porcupine Tree
- Signify N.V., Dutch multinational lighting corporation, formerly known as Philips Lighting N.V.
- signify (OpenBSD), OpenBSD utility

== See also ==
- Sign (disambiguation)
