= Signore, Udaipurwati =

dudiya
- Village
- Location in Rajasthan, India dudiya (India)
- Coordinates: 27.86461°N 75.47231°E
- Country: India
- State: Rajasthan
- District: Jhunjhunu

Government
  - Body: Panchayat
  - Sarpanch: SUMAN DEVI
- Elevation: 386 m (1,266 ft)

Population (2011)
  - Total: 5,674

Languages
  - Official: Hindi
- Time zone: UTC+5:30 (IST)
- PIN: 333032
- Telephone code: 91-1594
- ISO 3166 code: RJ-IN
- Vehicle registration: RJ-18
- Nearest city: Udaipurwati
- Distance from Udaipurwati: 18 kilometres (11 mi) (land)
- Distance from Nawalgarh: 20 kilometres (12 mi) (land)
- Distance from Jhunjhunu: 49 kilometres (30 mi) (land)
- Distance from Sikar: 39 kilometres (24 mi) (land)
- Avg. summer temperature: 46-48 °C
- Avg. winter temperature: 0-1 °C

Signore is a village in the north-eastern part of Indian state of Rajasthan. It is the Udaipurwati tehsil of Jhunjhunu.

== Demographics ==
According to the 2011 population census, the village has 5674 people. Out of those, 2857 are male and 2817 are females.

== Administration ==
Singnore village is a village panchayat in which Majhau and Dhani-Majhau are two revenue villages.

== Religion ==
Mataji temple is in Singnore village. Kalika Mata and Thakurji temples are in Majhau. A Shiva temple and a Gogaji temple are in Dhani Majhau. Jeen Mata Mandir is in Godara Ka Bass Singnor. The jeen mata mandir was renovated in 2017. A temple of Gogaji is in Godara Ki Dhani Singnor.

== Economy ==
The highway from Nawalgarh originates from the main market.
