= Sine (disambiguation) =

Sine is a trigonometric function.

Sine may also refer to:

- Maurice Sinet or Siné (1928–2016), a French cartoonist
- Sine Intira, a Thai actress, author and singer
- Sine FM, a community radio station based in Doncaster, South Yorkshire
- Short interspersed nuclear elements (SINEs), a short DNA sequences in eukaryote genomes
- Sine bar
- Sine (album), a 2008 album by C418

== Mathematics ==
- Abbe sine condition
- Discrete sine transform
- Sine wave, a mathematical function
- Sine and cosine transforms
- Sine quadrant
- Sine-Gordon equation

== Places ==
- Sinë, village in Albania
- Sine, Washington, a community in the United States
- Kingdom of Sine, a former kingdom in modern Senegal

== See also ==
- SINE (disambiguation)
- Port of Sines, a deep-water port in Portugal
- Sines Municipality, a city and municipality in Portugal
- Sinoatrial node
- Sine qua non
- Sign (disambiguation)
