= Flashing sign =

A flashing sign is a sign that contains a sequential flashing light source where the period of time of illumination is equal to the period of non-illumination, and is used solely to attract attention in a non-informative way.

The light can be intermittent or flashing, scintillating, blinking or traveling which give an illusion of flashing or intermittence or as an animation.

== See also ==
- Neon sign
- Flicker vertigo
- Photosensitivity
