= Signs =

Signs may refer to:

== Film and television ==
- Signs (film), a 2002 American science-fiction film written and directed by M. Night Shyamalan
- Signs (TV series) (Polish: Znaki), a 2018 Polish crime-thriller series
- "Signs" (Ted Lasso), a 2023 TV episode

== Music ==
=== Albums ===
- Signs (Badmarsh & Shri album) or the title song, 2001
- Signs (Jonny Lang album) or the title song, 2017
- Signs (Luke Bryan album), 2026
- Signs (Tedeschi Trucks Band album), 2019
- Signs, by Delerium, 2023
- Signs, by the Kathryn Tickell Band, 1993
- Signs, by Runtown, 2022

=== Songs ===
- "Signs" (Bloc Party song), 2009
- "Signs" (Cardiacs song), 1999
- "Signs" (Drake song), 2017
- "Signs" (Five Man Electrical Band song), 1970
- "Signs" (Luca Hänni song), 2018
- "Signs" (Snoop Dogg song), 2005
- "Signs", by Beyoncé featuring Missy Elliott from Dangerously in Love, 2003
- "Signs", by Creed from Weathered, 2001
- "Signs", by Guru Randhawa, 2022
- "Signs", by Starley, 2018
- "Signs", by Tate McRae from So Close to What, 2025

== Periodicals and publishing ==
- Signs (journal), a feminist academic journal
- Signs of the Times (magazine), a Seventh-day Adventist magazine published in the U.S. by Pacific Press
  - Signs of the Times (Australian magazine), the Australian edition of that magazine published by Signs Publishing Company
- Signs Publishing Company, Victoria, Australia

== Other uses ==
- Signs Gospel, a hypothetical source text for the Gospel of John, according to source criticism

== See also ==
- "Signes", a 2004 song by Nâdiya from 16/9
- Sign of the Times (disambiguation)
- Sign (disambiguation)
