= Bodenkirchen =

- Municipality
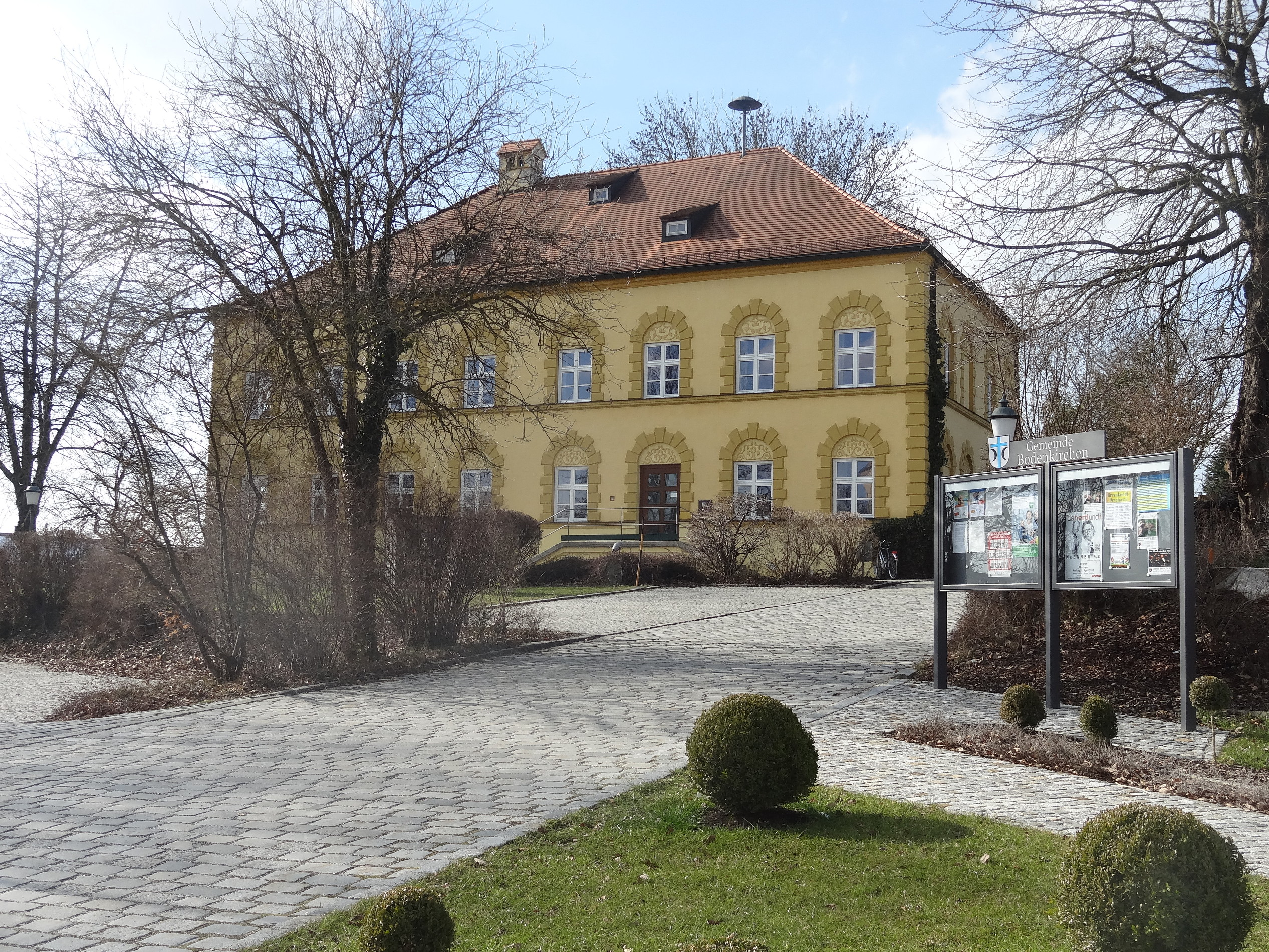
- Town hall

- Coat of arms

- Location of Bodenkirchen within Landshut district
- Interactive map of Bodenkirchen
- Location within Germany Location within Bavaria
- Coordinates: 48°22′N 12°22′E
- Country: Germany
- State: Bavaria
- Admin. region: Niederbayern
- District: Landshut
- Subdivisions: 4 Ortsteile

Government
  - Mayor (2020–26): Monika Maier (FW)

Area
  - Total: 62.00 km^{2} (23.94 sq mi)
- Elevation: 470 m (1,540 ft)

Population (2025-12-31)
  - Total: 5,259
  - Density: 84.82/km^{2} (219.7/sq mi)
- Time zone: UTC+01:00 (CET)
  - Summer (DST): UTC+02:00 (CEST)
- Postal codes: 84155
- Dialling codes: 08745
- Vehicle registration: LA
- Website: www.gemeinde-bodenkirchen.de

Bodenkirchen is a municipality in the district of Landshut in Bavaria in Germany.
