= Sennar (disambiguation) =

Sennar typically refers to one of two adjacent cities in the eastern Sudan near the Blue Nile.

It may also refer to:

- Sennar State, Sudan
- Funj Sultanate (1504–1821), also called the Kingdom of Sennar
- Plain of Sennar, the lowlands along the Blue Nile west of the Ethiopian Plateau

== See also ==
- Sennar Dam
