= Sign of the Times =

Sign of the Times, A Sign of the Times, or Signs of the Times may refer to:

== Christianity ==
- Matthew 16:2b–3, a passage in the Gospel of Matthew which contains the phrase the signs of the times (σημεῖα τῶν καιρῶν)
- Signs of Christ's return
- Sign of the times (Catholicism), a phrase associated with some Aggiornamentos of the Roman Catholic Church
- Signs of the Times Publishing Association, publishing house of the Seventh-day Adventist Church

=== Magazines ===
- Signs of the Times (magazine), Seventh-day Adventist monthly magazine for North America, published by Pacific Press
- Signs of the Times (Australian magazine), a Seventh-day Adventist monthly magazine, published by Signs Publishing Company

== Music ==
=== Albums ===
- Sign o' the Times, a 1987 album by Prince
- Sign of the Times (Axel Rudi Pell album), 2020
- Sign of the Times (Bob James album), 1981
- Sign of the Times: The Best of Queensrÿche, a 2007 compilation album by Queensrÿche
- Sign of the Times (Cosmic Gate album), 2009
- Sign of the Times (Rubettes album), 1976
- A Sign of the Times (Joe Pass album), 1966
- A Sign of the Times/My Love, originally My Love, a 1966 album by Petula Clark
- A Sign of the Times: The Spark Recordings 1975–1976, compilation album by Tommy Hunt

=== Songs ===
- "Sign of the Times" (Petula Clark song), also known as "A Sign of the Times", a 1966 song
- "Sign of the Times" (Bryan Ferry song), 1978
- "Sign of the Times" (Slade song), 1979
- "Sign of the Times" (The Belle Stars song), 1983
- "Sign o' the Times" (song), a 1987 song by Prince
- "Sign of the Times" (Queensrÿche song), 1997
- "Sign of the Times" (Harry Styles song), 2017
- "Sign of the Times", a 1981 song by Madness from 7
- "Sign of the Times", a 1984 song by Quiet Riot from the album Condition Critical
- "Sign of the Times", a 1985 song by Grandmaster Flash from the album They Said It Couldn't Be Done
- "Sign of the Times", a 1986 song by Cro-Mags from The Age of Quarrel
- "Sign of the Times", a 1988 song by Europe from Out of This World
- "Sign of the Times", a 2011 song by Three Days Grace from Transit of Venus
- "Sign of the Times", a 2015 song by CeeLo Green from Heart Blanche

== Other ==
- Sign o' the Times (film), a 1987 concert film featuring Prince
- "Signs of the Times", an 1829 essay by Thomas Carlyle
