= Signing =

Signing or Signed may refer to:

- Using sign language
- Signature, placing one's name on a document
- Signature (disambiguation)
- Manual communication, signing as a form of communication using the hands in place of the voice
- Digital signature, signing as a method of authenticating digital information
- Traffic sign, a road with a sign identifying is considered signed

== See also ==
- Wikipedia:Sign your posts on talk pages, the Wikipedia policy of signing Talk pages
