= Signing agent =

In American law, a signing agent or courtesy signer is an agent whose function is to obtain a formal signature of an appearer to a document. In common parlance, most jurisdictions require the appearer to sign before a notary public. From this, the practice of a notary public designating themselves as a signing agent has arisen. There are notaries public who specialize in the notarization of real estate transfer and loan document signings. Signing agents often have certification and training through private organizations, but is not a requirement in law, although it may be a requirement of the lender in the oversight of real estate transaction document signatures.

Also referred to as a notary signing agent or a loan signing agent, a signing agent should not be confused with a mortgage loan closer or closing agent. Signing agents are notaries public, who usually have experience and/or training concerning the proper execution of loan documents and are hired by mortgage companies, escrow companies, title companies, and signing services to identify loan documents, obtain the necessary signatures, and in some cases deliver the documents to the borrower. A signing agent is an impartial party to the transaction, and must adhere to the notary laws of their state or jurisdiction. In some states of the United States where signing agents are allowed, signing agents may identify documents and can point out terms to the loan transaction. However, signing agents are prohibited from giving legal advice or in any way explaining or interpreting the meaning of any terms or documents, and they are not permitted to prepare the documents, or alter them in any way. Any advice, explanation, or opinion can be considered unauthorized practice of law, except in the State of Louisiana, which is governed by Civil Law; in Louisiana, civil law notaries public have broad powers, and can actually prepare documents and discuss them with the signers.

The American Signing Agents Association Inc defines the signing agent as, "A signing agent is a trusted professional, usually a state commissioned notary public, that performs the closing ceremony for real estate transactions, mortgage loan transactions, legal process transactions and other similar transactions where an independent third part is requested. A signing agent should insure that they are disinterested in the transaction and have a mutual obligation to all parties to remain objective, neutral to any position, insure awareness of document contents by affiant and make a reasonable effort to prevent fraud and protect affiants from coercion."
