= Jennifer Sinor =

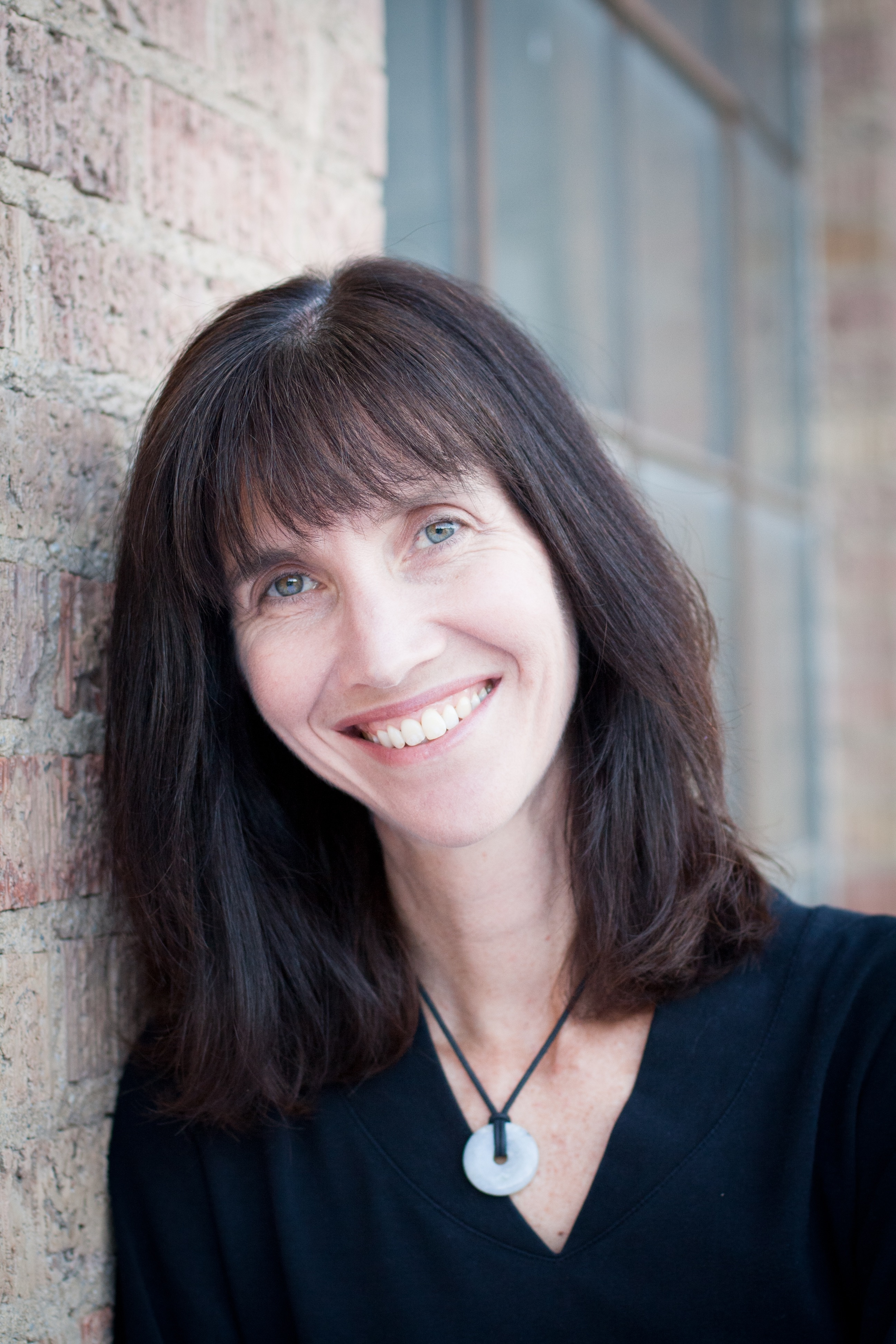
- Born: Jennifer Ann Sinor; Kingsville, Texas
- Education: University of Nebraska–Lincoln; University of Hawaii at Manoa; University of Michigan
- Occupations: Author, professor
- Writing career
- Genre: non-fiction
- Website: jennifersinor.com

Jennifer Ann Sinor is an American author and professor of English at Utah State University. She writes literary nonfiction, including memoirs and personal essays, as well as fiction. Her books include Ordinary Trauma: A Memoir (2017), Letters Like the Day: On Reading Georgia O'Keeffe (2017), and the novel The Beautiful Plain (2026). Her essays have been anthologized in The Best American Essays and The Norton Reader.

== Biography ==
Born in Kingsville, Texas, Sinor was raised as a military dependent. Her father, a naval lawyer specializing in international ocean law, was stationed in Hawaii several times as well as the Pentagon.

Sinor graduated from the University of Nebraska–Lincoln, in 1987 with degrees in both English and Russian. While teaching 7th and 8th graders at Assets School in Honolulu, Hawaii, Jennifer completed her MA in English from the University of Hawaii at Manoa in 1995. In 1995, she began her PhD in English and Education at the University of Michigan where she focused on women's autobiographical writing.

She graduated in 2000 and moved to Logan, Utah. Since then, Sinor has taught in the English Department at Utah State University where she has served as chair of creative writing, interim associate department head, and Director of Graduate Studies. She is a professor of English and teaches creative writing at the undergraduate and graduate levels.

== Writing career ==
Sinor has published essays in many journals and anthologies including The American Scholar, The Utne Reader, Creative Nonfiction, The Chronicle of Higher Education, Ecotone, The Colorado Review and Seneca Review. Her essay, "Confluences," appears in the 13th edition of the Norton Reader. Her essay, “The Lives of Bryan,” appears in Best American Essays 2024. Her essays have been nominated for the Pushcart Prize and a National Magazine Award.

== Awards and Honors ==
- Honorable Mention, Personal Essay, Utah Writing Competition, 2007, "Headwaters"
- First place, Utah Original Writing Competition, Book-length Nonfiction, 2009, Rogue Wave
- First place, Utah Original Writing Competition, Novel, 2010 How Thin the Line
- Faculty Service Award, Department of English and College of Arts and Sciences, Utah State University, 2026

== Selected works ==
=== Books ===
- The Extraordinary Work of Ordinary Writing: Annie Ray's Diary (University of Iowa Press, 2002) ISBN 978-0-87745-833-3
- Placing the Academy: Essays on the Landscape, Work and Identity. Co-editor with Rona Kaufman (University of Iowa Press, 2007) ISBN 978-0-87421-657-8
- Letters Like the Day: On Reading Georgia O'Keeffe (University of New Mexico Press, 2017) ISBN 978-0-8263-5783-0
- Ordinary Trauma: A Memoir (University of Utah Press, 2017) ISBN 978-1-60781-537-2
- Sky Songs: Meditations on Loving a Broken World (University of Nebraska Press, 2020) ISBN 9781496222640
- The Yogic Writer: Uniting Breath, Body, and Page (Bloomsbury Academic, 2024) ISBN 9781350371965
- The Beautiful Plain: A Novel (University of Nebraska Press, 2026) ISBN 9781496248039

=== Essays ===
- “The Marlin,” Fourth Genre, Fall 2004
- "The Marlin," Fourth Genre, Fall 2004
- “Running Through the Dark,” Creative Nonfiction 27, Summer 2008
- "Running Through the Dark," Creative Nonfiction 27, Summer 2008
- “Confluences,” The American Scholar, Winter 2008
- "Confluences," The American Scholar, Winter 2008
- “Creating Voice,” The Rose Metal Press Field Guide to Writing Flash Nonfiction, 2012
- "Creating Voice," The Rose Metal Press Field Guide to Writing Flash Nonfiction, 2012
- “Out in the West,” The American Scholar, Autumn 2011
- "Out in the West," The American Scholar, Autumn 2011
- “The Wanting Creature,” Creative Nonfiction, Winter 2017, Issue #62
