= Gabriela Signori =

Swiss historian (b. 1960)

Gabriela Signori (born 1960) is a Swiss historian of the Middle Ages. She served as a professor of medieval history at the University of Münster from 2001–2006, and is a professor at the University of Konstanz from 2006 to the present. Her main area of research in medieval studies is the social history of the era: medieval law, gender mores, piety, and religious beliefs.

== Biography ==
As a student, Gabriela Signori studied at the University of Basel, the University of Geneva, the University of Lausanne, and the University of Paris (Sorbonne). Her PhD advisor at Basel was the historian František Graus. Her focus was on the late medieval period of the 14th and 15th centuries.

She worked as a lecturer at Bielefeld University from 1992–2000. She was appointed as a professor of medieval history at the University of Münster, and worked there in 2001–2006. She then joined the University of Konstanz to continue her research and teaching.

Signori has both authored and edited several works on the history of the period, particularly its religious history and practices.
