= Eldon =

Eldon may refer to:

== Places ==
=== Australia ===
- Eldon Range, Tasmania, a mountain range

=== Canada ===
- Eldon, Alberta, a locality
- Eldon Parish, New Brunswick
- Eldon Township, Ontario, a former municipality
- Eldon, Ontario, a former railway stop
- Eldon, Prince Edward Island
- Rural Municipality of Eldon No. 471, Saskatchewan

=== United Kingdom ===
- Eldon, County Durham, England, a village
- Eldon Hill, Derbyshire, England
- Eldon Square, Newcastle upon Tyne, England

=== United States ===
- Eldon, Iowa, a city
- Eldon, Missouri, a city
- Eldon Township, Benson County, North Dakota
- Eldon, Oklahoma, a census-designated place
- Eldon, Washington, an unincorporated community

== People and fictional characters ==
- Eldon (given name), a list of people and fictional characters
- Eldon (surname), a list of people

== Businesses ==
- Eldon Group, a product manufacturer headquartered in Madrid
- Eldon Insurance, a United Kingdom insurance company
- Eldon (toy company), a defunct business based in California

== Other uses ==
- Earl of Eldon, a title in the Peerage of the United Kingdom
- Eldon (mango), a mango cultivar originating in Miami, Florida

== See also ==
- Eldon Lane, County Durham, England, a village
- Old Eldon, County Durham, England, a village
- Eldon Square (disambiguation)
- Elden (disambiguation)
- Eldin (disambiguation)
