= Sinners =

Sinners may refer to:

- Sinners, people who commit sin
- Sinners (1920 film), a lost silent American drama film based on a play of the same name by Owen Davis
- Sinners (2004 film), also known as Stateside, an American romance film starring Rachael Leigh Cook and Jonathan Tucker
- Sinners (2025 film), an American supernatural horror film written and directed by Ryan Coogler
  - Sinners (soundtrack), the soundtrack of the 2025 film
  - "Sinners" (song), by Rod Wave for the 2025 film's soundtrack
- Sinners (novel), a later title of Jackie Collins' 1971 novel Sunday Simmons & Charlie Brick
- Sinners (EP), an indie pop EP by Lauren Aquilina

== See also ==
- Sin (disambiguation)
- Sinful (disambiguation)
- Sinner (disambiguation)
