= Sinful =

Sinful may refer to:

- Sinful, being or committing a sin
- Sinful (album), a 1979 hard rock album
- Sinful (film), a 1965 Mexican film
- Sinful (album), the 1987 debut solo album by Pete Wylie
  - "Sinful" (song), the album's title track and Wylie's debut solo single

== See also ==
- Sin (disambiguation)
- Sinner (disambiguation)
- Sinners (disambiguation)
