= Elden =

Elden may refer to:

== Places ==
- Elden, Netherlands, a village near Arnhem
- Elden, Orta, Turkey, a village
- Elden, Yeşilova, Turkey, a village
- Mount Elden, a mountain near Flagstaff, Arizona, United States

== Other uses ==
- Elden (name), a list of people with the given name or surname
- USS Elden, a United States World War II destroyer escort
- Elden Racing Cars, a British company

== See also ==
- Elden Pueblo, a prehistoric Native American village at the foot of Mount Elden
- Eldin, given name and surname
- Eldon (disambiguation)
