= Saul Goodman (percussionist) =

American timpanist and teacher (1907–1996)

Saul Goodman (July 16, 1907 – January 26, 1996) was the principal timpanist of the New York Philharmonic from 1926 to 1972.

== Career ==
Goodman was born in New York, the son of Polish Jewish emigrants, Abraham L. Goodman and Yetta Feigenbaum Goodman. He grew up in Brooklyn, and learned under the instruction of Alfred Friese. At the age of 19, Goodman succeeded Friese as principal timpanist in the New York Philharmonic. Goodman was a member of the faculties at the Conservatoire de musique du Québec à Montréal and the Juilliard School of Music where he taught many who went on to become timpanists in symphony orchestras around the world.

During his career Goodman made innovations in drum and mallet construction, including a tuning system for drums and a line of timpani mallets, which Regal Tip began manufacturing in 1979. He played the first performance of a timpani concert to be broadcast. During his years at the philharmonic, he lived in Yonkers, NY.

His wife was Lillian Rehberg Goodman, cellist, winner of Naumburg Competition (1931) and the president of Violoncello Society of New York (1972–1975). Goodman died in Palm Beach, Florida.

== Works ==
=== Method Book ===
- Modern Method for Timpani
- Modern Classic Solos for Snare Drum
- Saul Goodman Memorial Percussion Ensemble Collection

=== Solo ===
- Introduction and Allegro (Timpani)
- Ballad for the Dance (Timpani & Suspended Cymbal)

=== Ensemble ===
- Scherzo for Percussion For 3 Players
- Theme and Variations For 4 Players
- Proliferation Suite For 7 Players

== Notable students ==
- Elden C. "Buster" Bailey, New York Philharmonic
- Everett "Vic" Firth, Boston Symphony Orchestra
- William Kraft, Los Angeles Philharmonic
- Leon Milo, composer, percussionist. and sound artist
- Ruth Underwood, percussionist Frank Zappa's Mothers of Invention from 1967 to 1977
- David Friedman, vibraphonist, Hochschule-Berlin
- Charles Dowd, percussionist, Eugene Symphony Orchestra, professor, University of Oregon, Author A Funky Primer and other texts
