= Sin (disambiguation) =

Sin is an act of transgression against divine law.

Sin or SIN may also refer to:

== Arts and entertainment ==
=== Fictional characters ===
- Sin (DC Comics)
- Sin (Marvel Comics)
- Sin, a Final Fantasy X character
- Sin (Devil May Cry), a demon in the video game Devil May Cry
- Sin Kiske, a Guilty Gear character

=== Film and television ===
- Sin (1915 film), an American silent drama film
- Sin (1928 film), a British-Swedish silent drama film
- Sin (1948 film), a Swedish drama film
- Sin (2003 film), an American crime thriller film
- Sin (2019 film), a Russian-Italian drama film
- Sin: The Movie, a 2000 Japanese animated film
- "Sin", an episode of Fullmetal Alchemist
- "Sin", an episode of Law & Order: Special Victims Unit (season 8)
- WCW Sin, a 2001 wrestling event
- Noticias SIN, a Dominican television news program

=== Music ===
- Sin (album), by Mother Superior, 2002
- Sin/Pecado, an album by Moonspell, 1998
- "Sin" (song), by Nine Inch Nails, 1990
- "Sin", a 1992 song by Stone Temple Pilots from Core
- "Sin", a 1997 song by Megadeth from Cryptic Writings
- "Sin", a 2011 song by Jani Lane
- "(It's No) Sin", a 1951 song
- "Sin Sin Sin", a single by Robbie Williams, 2006
- Sin, a former French band (see Transporter 2#Music)

=== Other uses in arts and entertainment ===
- SiN, a first-person shooter video game
- Sin (José novel), by F. Sionil José
- Sin (Prilepin novel), a 2007 novel by Zakhar Prilepin
- Sin Newspaper, a student newspaper in Galway, Ireland

== Businesses and organisations ==
- SIN Cars, a Bulgarian sports car manufacturer
- SIN (brand), a unique Czech glassmaking technology
- Servicio de Inteligencia Nacional (National Intelligence Service), Peru
- Sistema de Inteligencia Nacional (National Intelligence System), Argentina
- Service d'Intelligence National (National Intelligence Service), Haiti
- Spanish International Network, a former TV network
- Sin industry, a generic term for legal business activities often considered immoral

== People ==
- Shan (surname), the Chinese surname 單/单 or 冼, both romanised as Sin in Cantonese
- Shin (Korean surname), or Sin
- Šín, Czech surname
- Jaime Sin (1928–2005), Filipino cardinal, Archbishop emeritus of Manila
- Abigail Sin (born 1992), Singaporean concert pianist
- Sin Boon Ann (born 1958), Singaporean politician and lawyer
- Sin Chung-kai (born 1960), Hong Kong politician
- Dahlia Sin, American drag queen
- Damien Sin (1965–2011), Singaporean author, poet and musician
- Oleksandr Sin (born 1961), Ukrainian politician
- Oliver Sin (born 1985), Hungarian artist
- Sin Quirin, American guitarist

== Places ==
- Şin, Azerbaijan
- Sin, Iran, Isfahan province
- Sin Rural District, Isfahan province
- Sen, Iran, or Sin, Khuzestan province
- Sin River, Huai Mae Sin, Thailand
- Sin, the ancient Greek and Roman name for China
- Kingdom of Sine or Sin, in modern Senegal
- Sin, Hebrew name of Pelusium in ancient Egypt
- Singapore, UNDP country code
- Singapore Changi Airport, IATA airport code SIN
- Wilderness of Sin, a geographic area mentioned in the Bible

== Other uses ==
- Sin, abbreviation for sine, a math function
- Sin (Mandaeism), the Mandaean name for the moon
- Sin (mythology), a moon deity in the Mesopotamian religions
- Sin, the sky god and chief deity in Haida mythology
- Sinhala language, ISO 939-2/3 language code sin
- Sex Industry Network (SIN)
- Social insurance number (SIN)
- Las Vegas Sin, a team in the Legends Football League
- Shin (letter), or Šin, a letter of many Semitic alphabets

== See also ==
- Sins (disambiguation)
- Sinner (disambiguation)
- Sine (disambiguation)
- The Sin (disambiguation)
