= Aldin =

Male given name

- Gender: Male

Other gender
- Feminine: Aldina

Origin
- Meaning: Religion, faith, creed

Other names
- Variant form: Eldin

Aldin is a masculine given name and surname.

In the Balkans, Aldin is popular among Bosniaks in the former Yugoslav nations. The name is a modification to the suffix component ad-Din, and it holds the same meanings of religion, faith, creed.

In England, Aldin is used as a surname and it is derived from the Anglo-Saxon elements eald, meaning "old", and wine, meaning "friend".

== Given name ==
- Aldin Adžović (born 1994), Montenegrin football midfielder
- Aldin Ayo (born 1977), Filipino basketball coach
- Aldin Čajić (born 1992), Bosnian footballer
- Aldin Ćatović (born 2007), Serbian athlete
- Aldin Đidić (born 1983), Bosnian footballer
- Aldin Grout (1803–1894), American missionary
- Aldin Gurdijeljac (born 1978), Serbian-born Bosnian footballer
- Aldin Kurić (born 1970), Bosnian singer, songwriter, and composer
- Aldin Šetkić (born 1987), professional Bosnian tennis player
- Aldin Skenderović (born 1997), Luxembourgish international footballer
- Aldin Spahović, Bosnian volleyball player
- Aldin Turkeš (born 1996), Bosnian footballer

== Surname ==
- Cecil Aldin (1870–1935), British artist and illustrator
- Salih Saif Aldin (1975–2007), Iraqi journalist and correspondent

== See also ==
- Aldein
- Aldina
- Aldine (disambiguation)
- Khaldin (disambiguation)
