= Sins (disambiguation) =

Sins are acts of transgression against divine law.

Sins may also refer to:

== Film and television ==
- Sins (film), a 2005 Bollywood film
- Sins (miniseries), a 1986 CBS television miniseries
- The Sins, a 2000 British TV series
- Sins, episode from Series 7 of the British TV series Waking the Dead

== Other uses ==
- Sins (novel), a novel written by Sionil José
- "Sins", a song by Reks from Straight, No Chaser, 2012
- Johnny Sins, American pornographic actor, director, and YouTuber
- Les Sins, moniker for American singer, songwriter Chaz Bear
- Sins, Aargau, Switzerland

== See also ==
- Sin (disambiguation)
- Sins Invalid
