= Prague Sounds =

Music festival in the Czech Republic

Prague Sounds is a music festival presenting international artists in the fields of jazz, electronic music, hip-hop, contemporary classical music, and singer-songwriter projects. It takes place in various concert halls and clubs across Prague. The festival frequently presents Czech premieres of both established and emerging artists from around the world.

== History ==
Prague Sounds was founded in 1996 by Prague Castle music program curators Marek Vrabec and Martin Pechanec under the name Struny podzimu (Strings of Autumn). The first edition took place in 1996. With its programming, the festival addressed a wide audience and created space for encounters between lovers of classical music, jazz, and world music.

After a quarter of a century, however, the organizers felt that the festival had outgrown its original name. Today, the program no longer focuses solely on "strings", but on a carefully curated selection of music regardless of genre. In 2022, the festival was therefore renamed Prague Sounds.

== Festival stars ==
Over the years, the festival has presented numerous prominent musical figures and has systematically introduced a new generation of artists.

Among the festival’s guests are jazz legends such as Wayne Shorter, Herbie Hancock, Sonny Rollins, and Ahmad Jamal. From the world of contemporary composition, the festival has hosted figures including Steve Reich, Terry Riley, Julia Wolfe, and Michael Gordon.

The festival's genre-defying nature is also reflected in concerts by hip-hop group De La Soul or Czech musician Jiří Suchý. The Prague Sounds program further features representatives of contemporary scenes ranging from experimental hip-hop and electronic music (e.g. Shabazz Palaces, Young Fathers, Nils Frahm, Alva Noto), through jazz artists (e.g. Robert Glasper, Brad Mehldau, Jason Moran), to cross-genre innovators (e.g. Lambchop, Punch Brothers).

All of the above artists were presented by the festival in the Czech Republic for the very first time, as were Benjamin Clementine, Mexican singer Silvana Estrada, Pulitzer Prize winner Caroline Shaw, the vocal ensemble Roomful of Teeth, and the ensemble Sō Percussion. Thanks to Prague Sounds, electronic musician Oneohtrix Point Never also returned to the Czech stage after 15 years.

Prague Sounds also initiates new projects and productions, such as the concert performance of Zdeněk Liška’s music for Marketa Lazarová. The festival further creates opportunities for artistic encounters that may prove pivotal — for example, the reunion of Gregory Porter with Czech Hammond organist Ondřej Pivec led to a joint Grammy-winning album and long-term collaboration.

== Special concerts and new projects ==
The festival also organizes concerts on a floating stage directly on the surface of the Vltava River. These annual river concerts were created in response to the coronavirus pandemic in 2020. The concert titled Prague Sounds / Hope for Prague, featuring British violinist Daniel Hope, attracted significant international media attention. The event was recorded by Czech Television, reported on by Reuters, broadcast by the international cultural TV channel ARTE, and later included in the catalogue of the German label Deutsche Grammophon.

In subsequent years, performers included cellist Yo-Yo Ma and singer Lizz Wright.

In the year the festival was renamed Prague Sounds (2022), it continued its open-air Vltava series with the Concert for Europe, held on the occasion of the Czech Presidency of the Council of the European Union. The following year, Prague Sounds organized a concert in the Vladislav Hall of Prague Castle, featuring Britten's War Requiem.

In 2024, Prague Sounds introduced two new original festival projects — singers David Koller and Richard Müller paid tribute to Karel Kryl at the Rudolfinum, and a curated evening featuring young Czech and Slovak talents took place for the first time.

In 2026, Prague Sounds will celebrate its 30th anniversary edition.

== See also ==
- Designblok
