= SIN (brand) =

- Product type: three-dimensional objects of fused glass
- Current owner: Jiří Šín, Roman Pilíšek
- Country: Czech Republic
- Introduced: 2010

SIN is the name of a Czech glassmaking technology that enables the direct casting of three-dimensional glass objects using the Vitrum Vivum (Living Glass) technique. It has already been used to create monumental works of art with complex shapes or as part of architectural designs. The brand is named after its owner, Czech glass master Jiří Šín, who has been building it since 2010. SIN owns a workshop with glass furnaces in Bělá pod Bezdězem in the Central Bohemian Region and draws on many years of experience and know-how in the Czech glass industry. The co-owner of the brand is entrepreneur Roman Pilíšek.

Jiří Šín's Vitrum Vivum uses newly developed technology to cast three-dimensional glass objects into a closed mold, allowing for the realization of artistic designs of any size or spatial complexity. Since 2024, SIN has had its own gallery at Jungmannovo náměstí 21 in Prague 1.

== Brand history ==
The author of the unique technology of casting glass into a closed mold is Jiří Šín (* 1981), a graduate of the Secondary School of Applied Arts for Glassmaking in Kamenický Šenov and the Higher Vocational School of Glassmaking in Nový Bor. He also gained experience as a technologist for the companies Preciosa and Lasvit During his studies, he encountered the limitations of the then-current method of casting glass sculptures, so he built his own workshop with a furnace, where he spent twelve years transforming and improving established techniques. He also completed internships in Germany and the Netherlands, where he studied stained glass, glassblowing, and glass melting.

In 2010, he founded a glass workshop with two furnaces in Bělá pod Bezdězem, where he tested and introduced his own method of casting glass into molds, called "Vitrum Vivum."

=== Vitrum Vivum ===
The pioneers of molten glass sculptures in the 1960s were Stanislav Libenský and Jaroslava Brychtová, who introduced the technique of casting massive glass objects into open sand-plaster molds. However, this method did not allow for the creation of spatially complex and intricate shapes. Jiří Šín acknowledges their legacy, but attempted to overcome the limitations of the open mold, which always creates a flat surface of molten glass, requiring more complex shapes to be cut or glued together from multiple pieces. In contrast, Vitrum Vivum technology offers new possibilities and a shift in the glass industry towards greater creative freedom. It does not depend on the surface of molten glass in the mold and subsequent grinding or gluing, but allows three-dimensional objects to be created directly. The pinnacle of this method's possibilities is a perfect sphere—for example, a basketball with a completely imprinted relief.

Molten glass is poured into a mold through channels, similar to the casting of bronze artifacts. The process allows for the creation of monumental glass sculptures from a single piece of glass. The size of the sculptures is limited only by the size of the furnace, where gradual cooling takes place. Since 2022, Jiří Šín, together with the co-owner of the brand, entrepreneur Roman Pilíšek, have been building the world's largest furnace for molten sculpture in Humrov near Bělá pod Bezdězem. The new autonomous furnace, which can calculate the exact cooling time, will enable casting of objects up to five meters in size.

=== Realizations ===
In 2017, Jiří Šín began collaborating with Rony Plesl and later invited other artists to join him in creating glass sculptures that blur the line between fine art and applied art. One of them is Milan Knížák, who was given the opportunity at the SIN studio to create works that he was unable to realize in the 1980s. A typical feature of his designs is their multifunctional use. Jiří Šín is also inspired by the unconventional Carpenters Workshop Gallery in London, which offers artists the opportunity to create their works from materials found in the gallery's workshop.

In 2018, works designed by Rony Plesl and cast in the glassworks of Jiří Šín in Bělá pod Bezdězem appeared for the first time at the Designblok exhibition in the Lapidarium of the National Museum in Prague. Rony Plesl presented a glass installation entitled Fire Walk With Me inspired by David Lynch. Along with this installation, a glass object entitled Big Bang was also presented at Designblok in 2018, which predetermined the future path of the SIN brand. Big Bang is composed of six prisms of uranium glass, but melted into a single piece without any bonding. Its perfectly clean appearance and precise geometry of cut glass was inspired by basalt monoliths, which form huge columnar structures in the Czech landscape (e.g. Panská skála).

The result of their further collaboration was presented in 2019 at the Victoria and Albert Museum in London as a one-tonne object entitled Sacral Geometry. The first monumental glass sculptures, 215–225 cm high and 80 cm in diameter, were exhibited by Rony Plesl at the Venice Biennale as part of the International Year of Glass 2022. Three crystal glass objects with a surface texture resembling the bark of centuries-old oak trees and an object made of uranium glass with a bas-relief depicting the body of Jesus Christ, placed near the altar and illuminating the space with a mysterious light, were installed in the Church of Santa Maria della Visitazione. Architect Josef Pleskot participated in the design. The project was financially supported by the PPF Group.

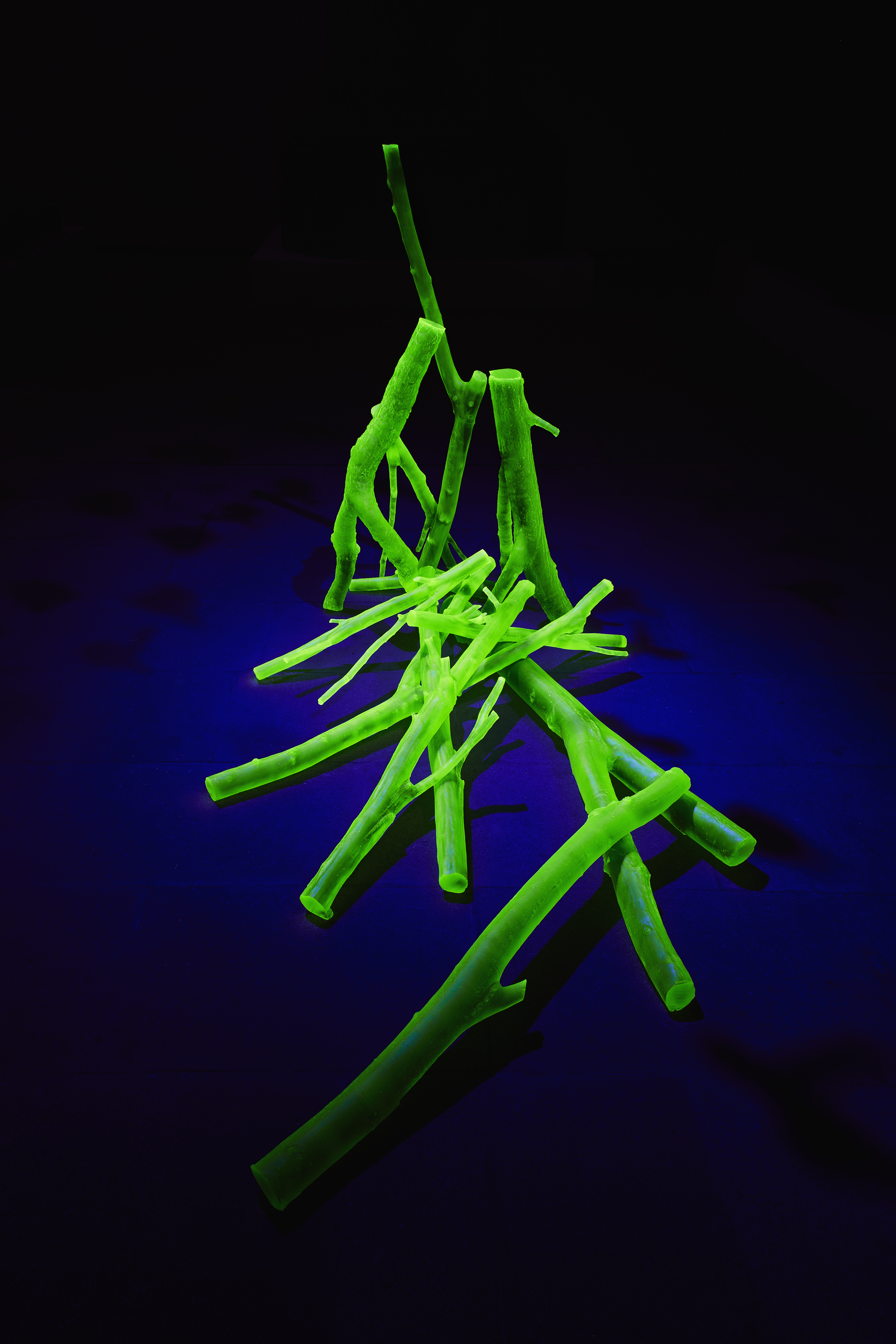
Studio SIN, Rony Plesl, Fire Walk With Me (2018)

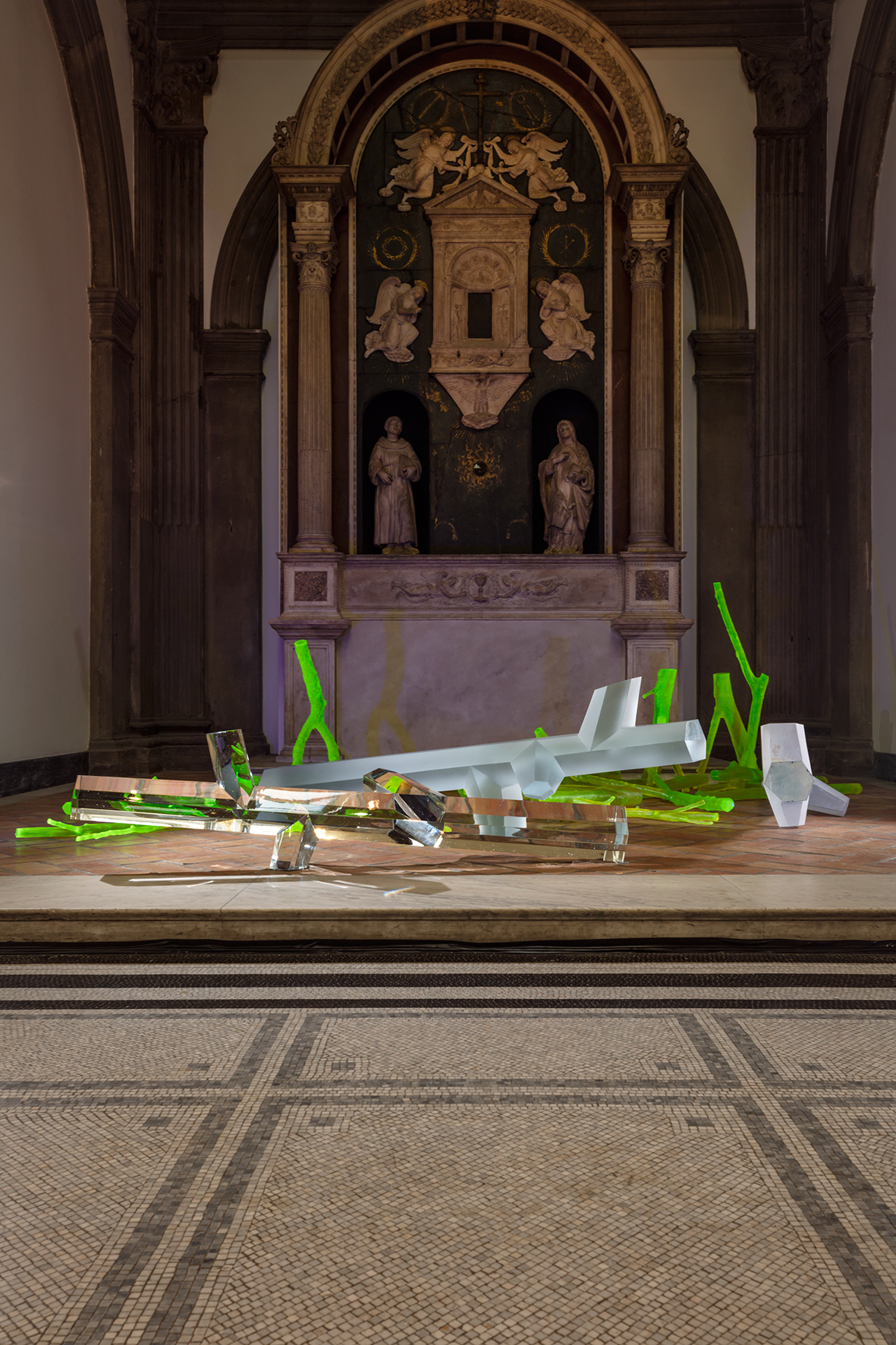
Studio SIN, Rony Plesl, Sacral Geometry (2019)

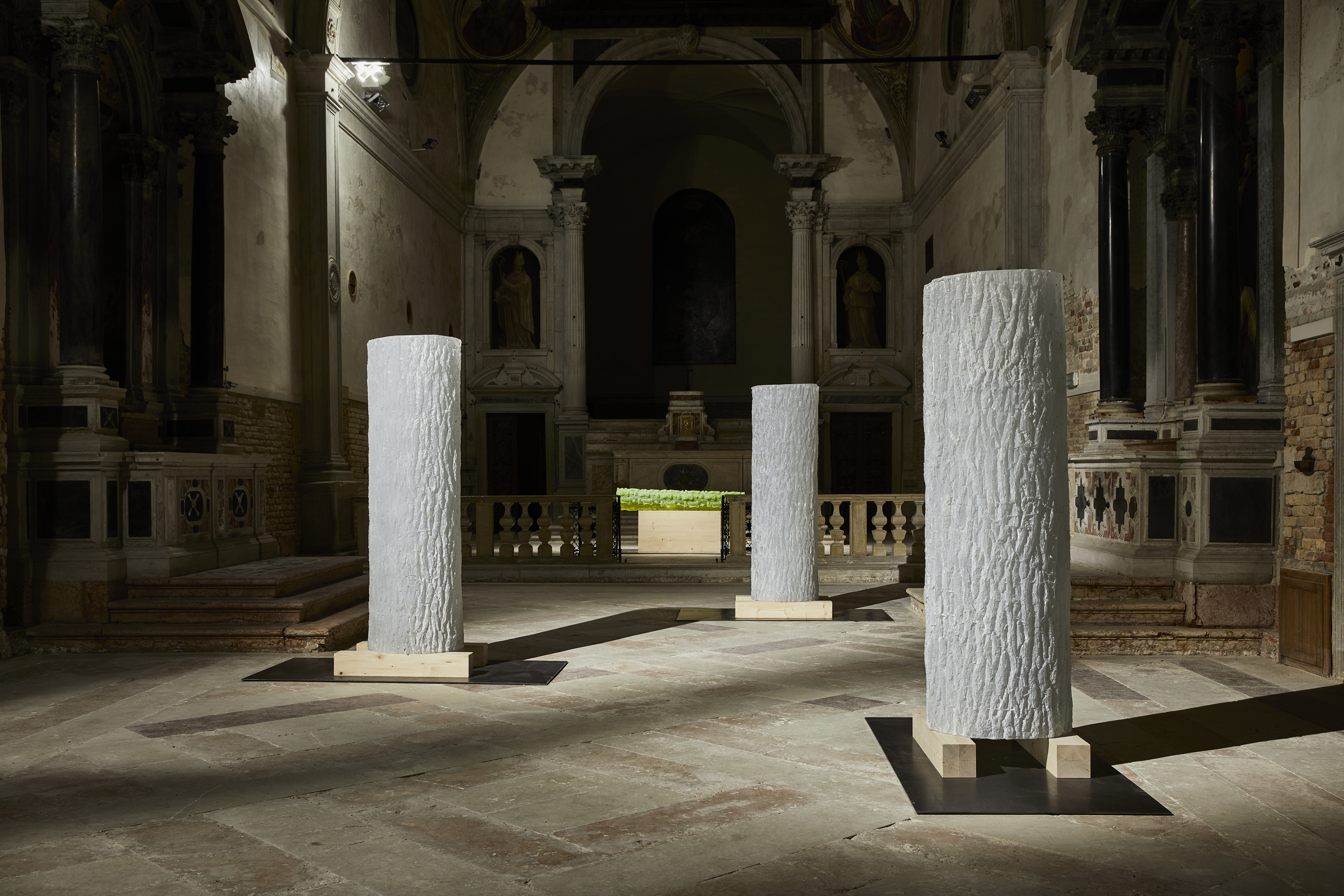
Studio SIN, Rony Plesl, Trees Grow from the Sky, Venice (2022)

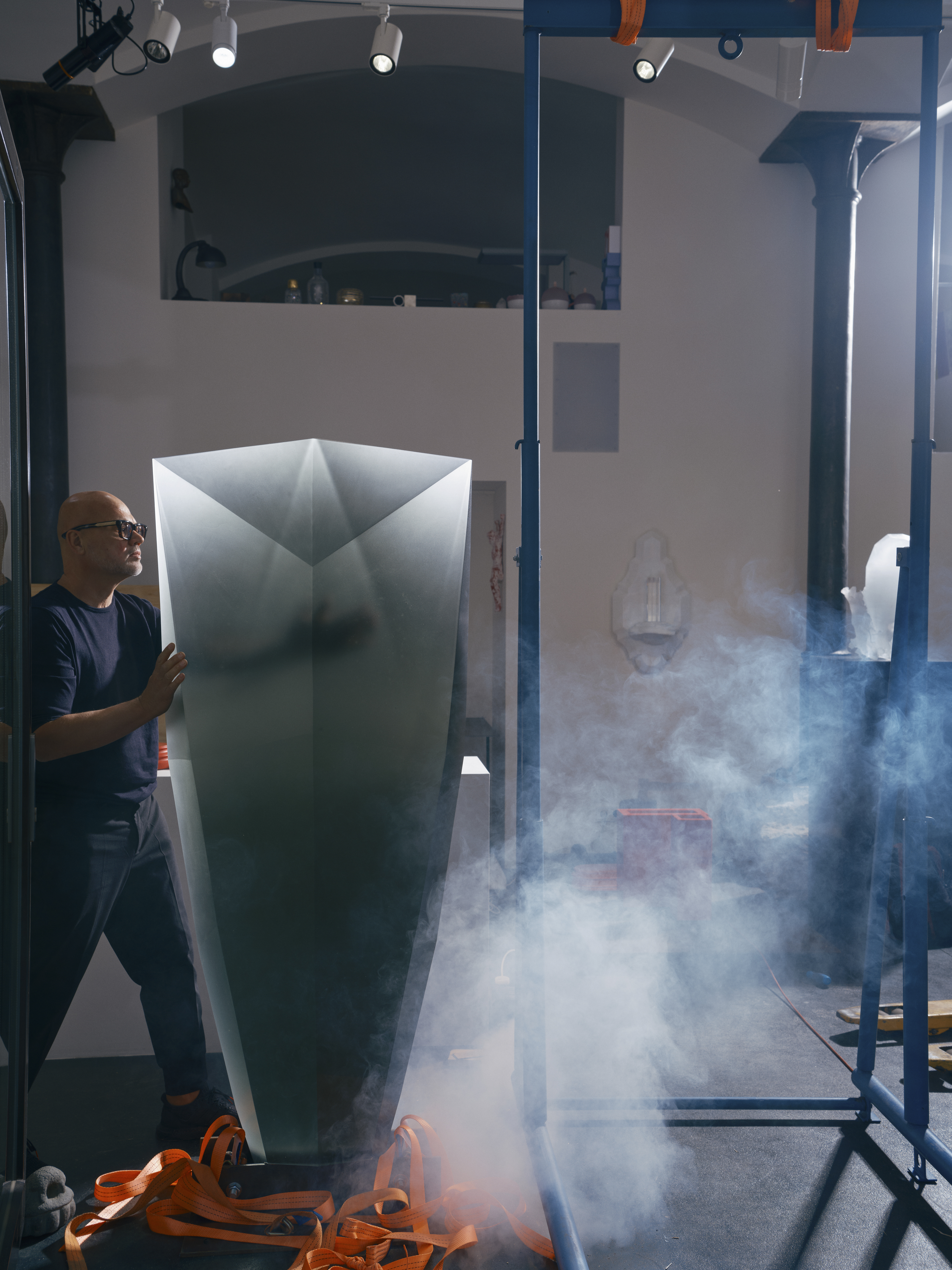
Studio SIN, Rony Plesl, Samurai Gi (2024)

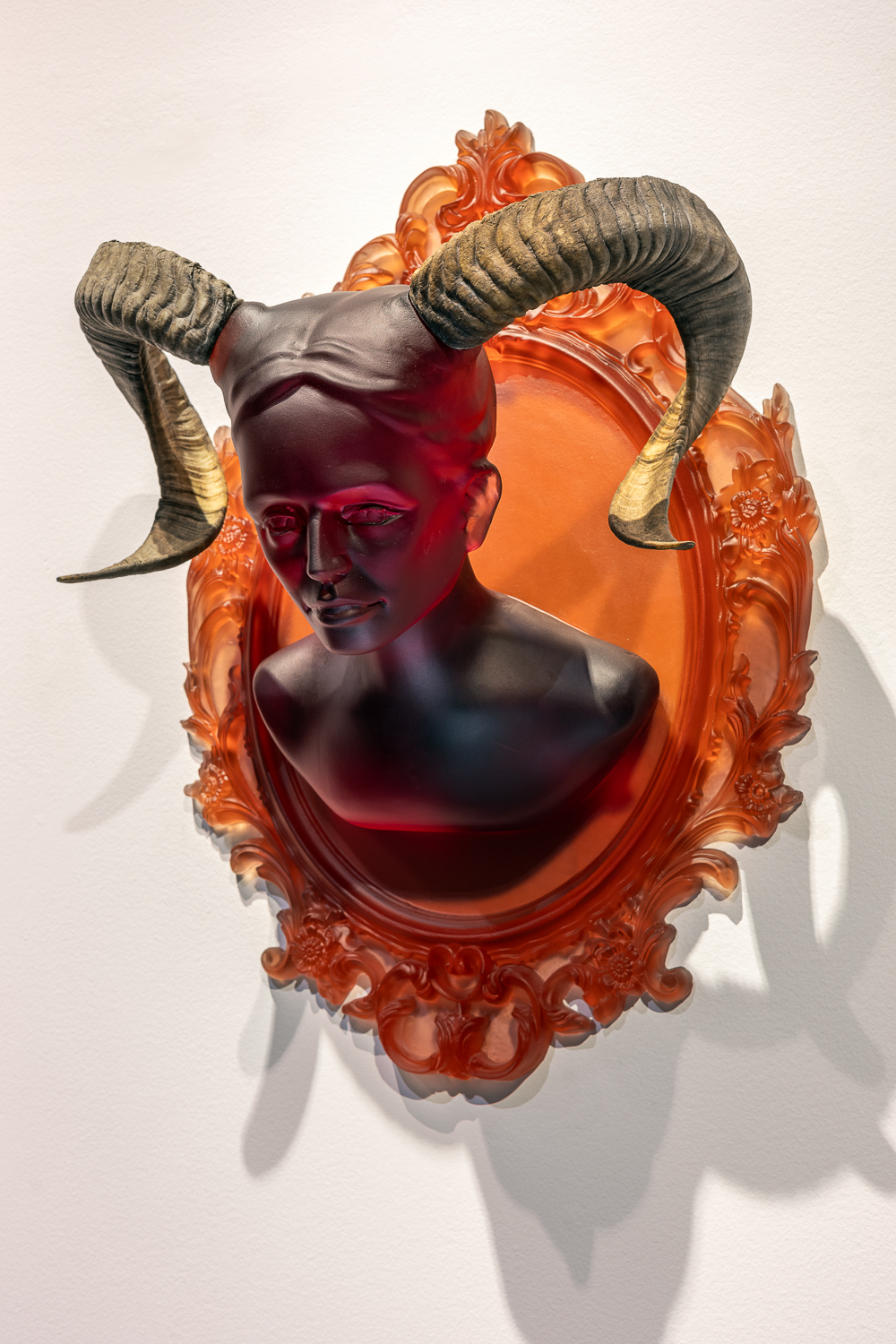
Studio SIN, Paulina Skavova, Trophy I (2024)

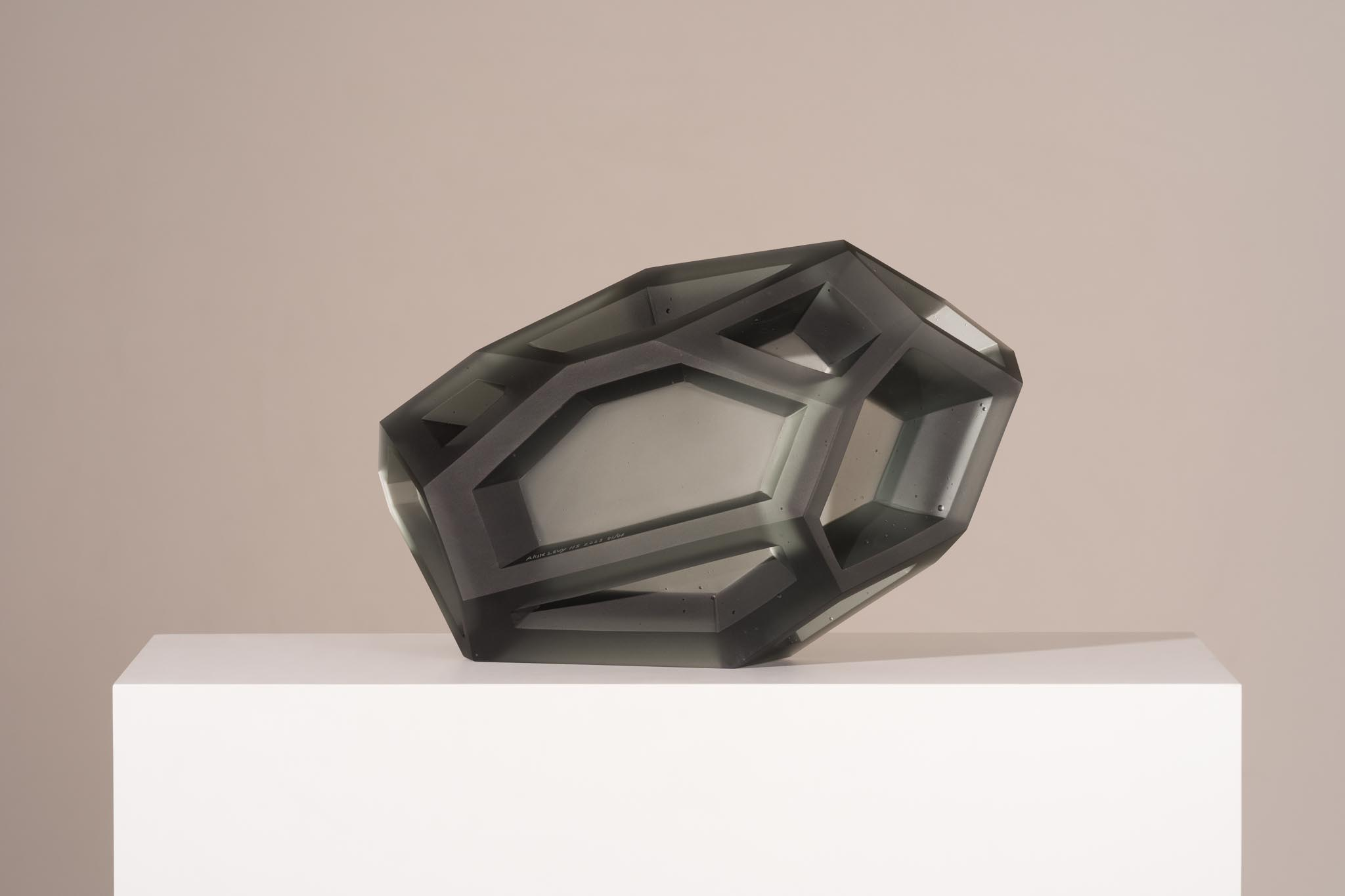
Studio SIN, Arik Levy, NegativeSpace 64 (2023)

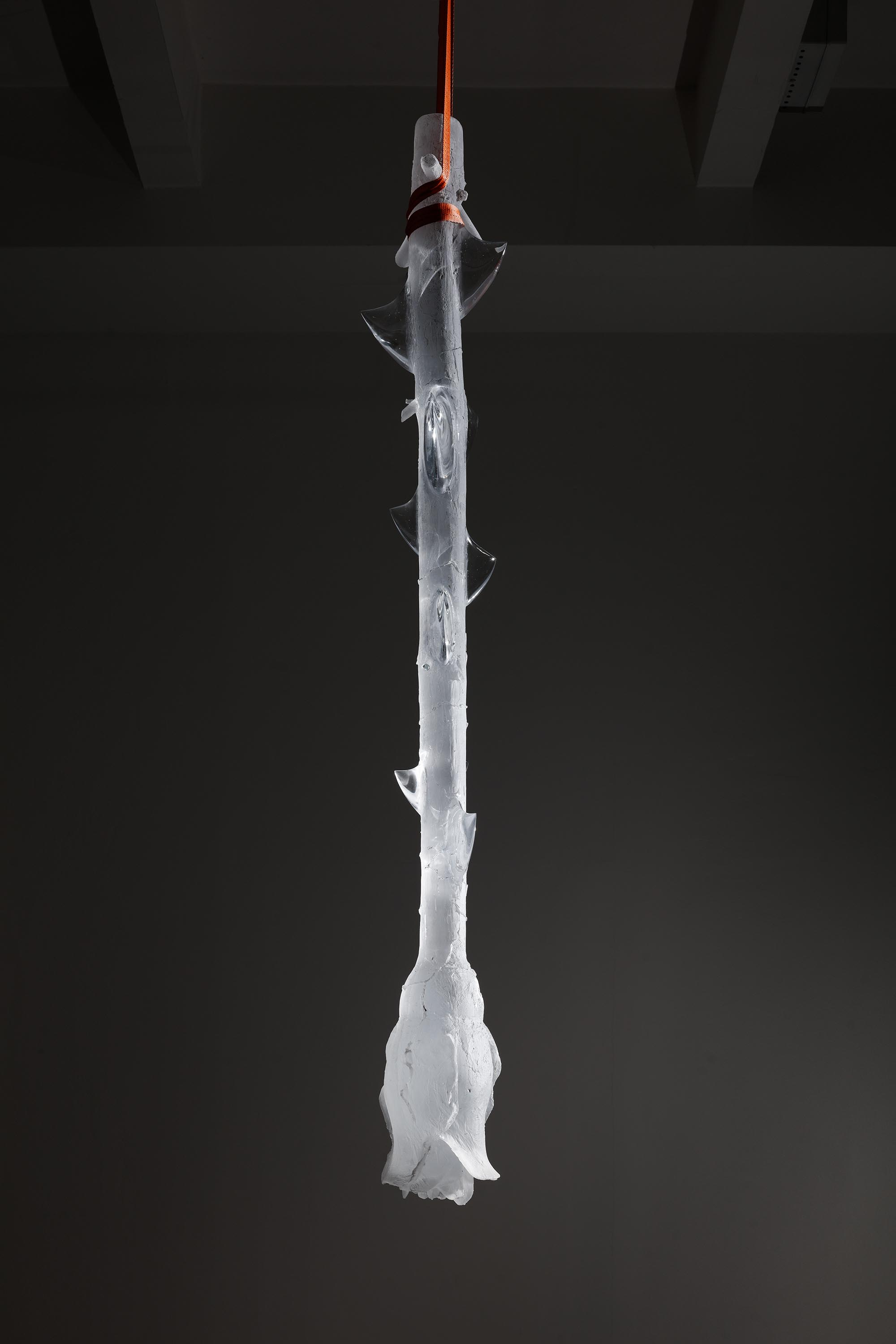
Studio SIN, Rony Plesl, Wild rose II (2023)

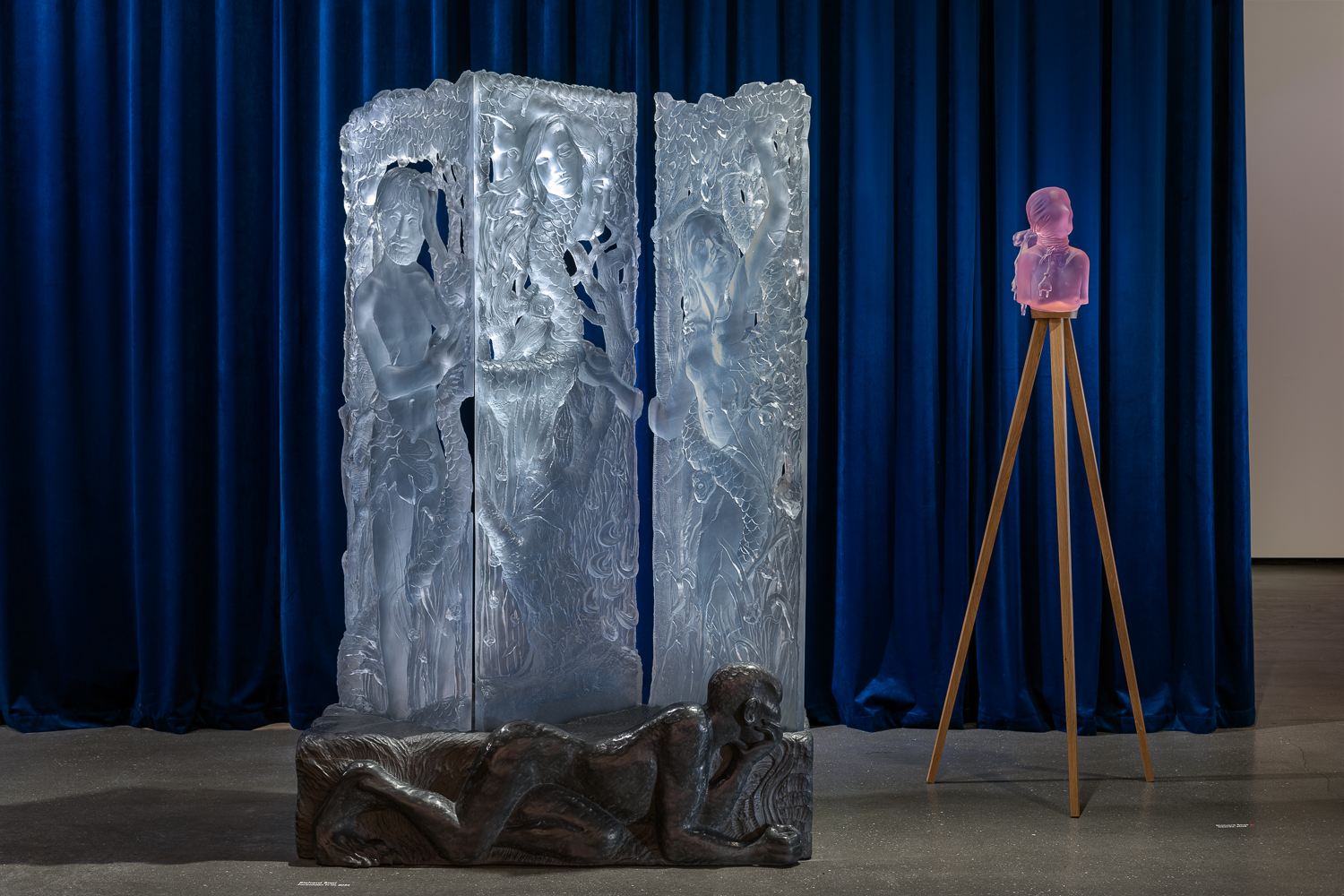
Studio SIN, Richard Štipl, Forbidden Fruit and Désirée (2024)

=== Artists ===
- Rony Plesl
- Arik Levy
- Jiří Černický
- Krištof Kintera
- Milan Knížák
- Laura Limbourg (painter born in Antwerp, graduate of the Academy of Fine Arts in Prague)
- Ondrash & Kašpárek
- Pasta Oner
- Paulina Skavova
- Richard Štipl
- Jan Kovářík (sculptor, graduate of the Academy of Fine Arts in Prague)

=== Collaboration ===
Since 2022, Studio Najbrt, which created the logo, presentation, and font, has been developing a new visual identity for the brand. SIN Studio's work also focuses on collectible sculptures that blend applied and fine art. The first series of glass vases, bowls, tables, and lamps, entitled "Translucent," was designed by Rony Plesl.

In 2025, SIN participates together with Rony Plesl in the world exhibition Expo 2025 in Osaka, Japan. Inside and outside the Czech national pavilion, it presents glass sculptures made using the "Vitrum Vivum" technology in an installation that symbolically connects the themes of nature and human existence.

=== Exhibitions ===
==== SIN ====
- 2024 Group exhibition Heavy Weights, DSC Gallery, Prague
- 2024 Group exhibition Objects of Desire by SIN feat. Benedikt Renč, Hauch Gallery
- 2025 Group exhibition Objects of Desire by SIN feat. Rony Plesl, ZOYA Museum, Modra
- 2025 Czech Pavilion at Expo 2025 in Osaka

==== Realizations for Rony Plesl ====
- 2018 Rony Plesl, Designblok, Prague International Design Festival
- 2019 Rony Plesl, Sacral Geometry, Victoria and Albert Museum, London (now part of the Imagine Museum: Contemporary glass art collection, St. Petersburg, Florida, USA)
- 2022 Rony Plesl, Trees Grow from the Sky, Chiesa di Santa Maria della Visitazione, Fondamenta Zattere ai Gesuati, 59th Venice Biennale
- 2023 Rony Plesl, Trees Grow from the Sky, Museum Kampa, Prague
- 2023 Made by Fire, Salone del Mobile Milano 2023 at the Milan Triennial (featuring works by Rony Plesl)

== Sources ==
- Josefína Pleslová ed., Objects of Desire by SIN, feat. Benedikt Renč, exhibition catalogue, SINGALLERY s.r.o., 2024
- Danica Kovářová, Avant-gardisté. Rozhovor s Jiřím Šínem / Avant-gardists. An interview with Jiří Šín, Vogue Life Interview, květen 2024, s. 86-87
- Jiří Mareček, SIN Studio gallery. Unikátní technologie ve službách umění / Unique technology at the service of art, Top Class 5, 2024, s. 56-58
- Rony Plesl, Translucent, Helbich Printing House a.s., 2022
