= Leon Milo =

American classical composer

Leon Milo (December 10, 1956 - August 31, 2014) was an American composer, percussionist and sound artist.

He was known for music and sonic environments in which instruments, electronics, natural sounds and synthesis are unified. His music is internationally recognized.

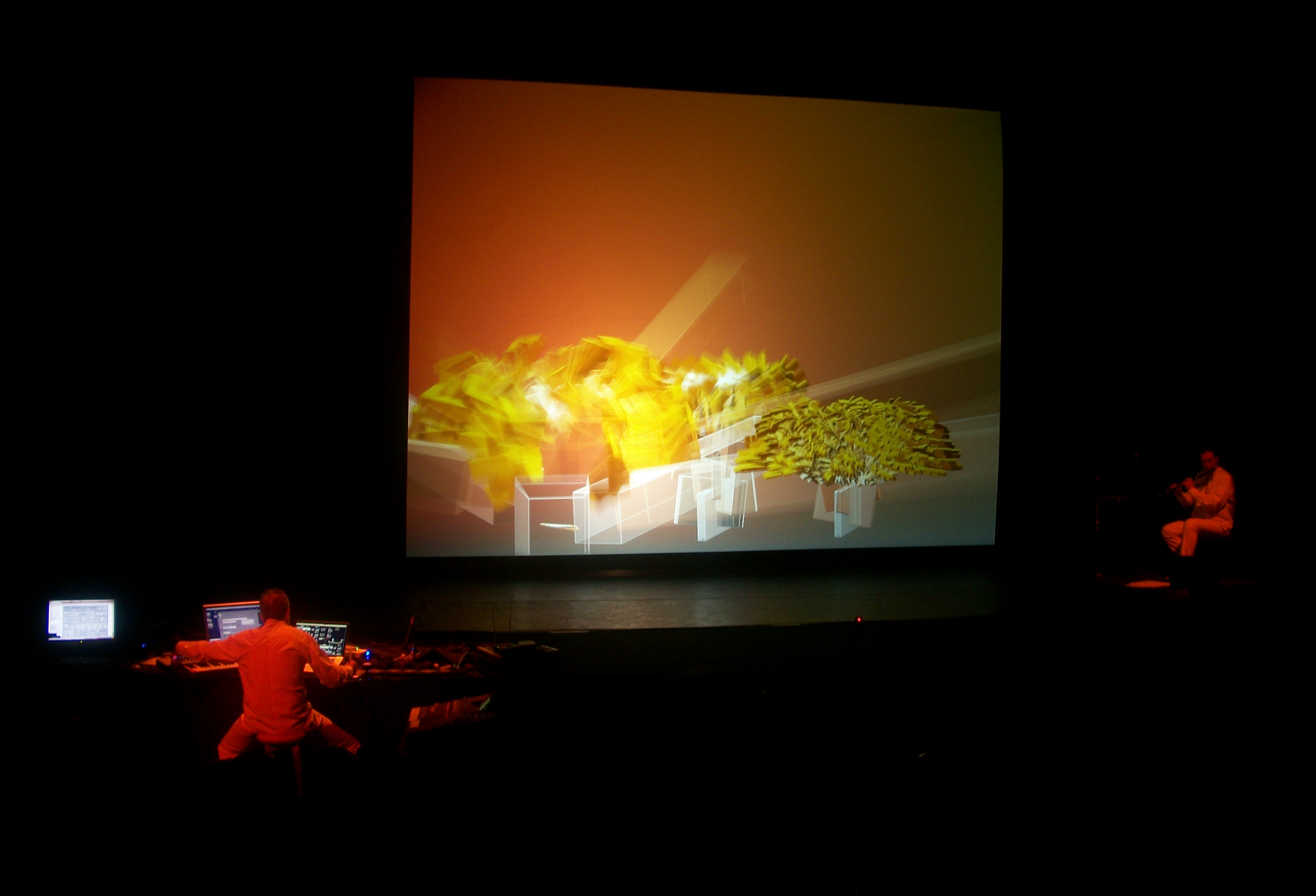
Live performance - Ensemble "Interact-Son" - Leon Milo and Francois Daudin Clavaud at Festival Mediarte in Monterrey (Mexico) in 2009, interactive video by Miguel Chevalier

== Biography ==
=== Early years ===
Growing up in the Hollywood Hills, Milo had access to the most important artists on the west coast. In his teens, he studied with the renowned drummers Bill Douglass, Charles Flores and Joe Porcaro. At 15 years old, he began studying timpani and orchestral percussion with William Kraft, who introduced him to the classical orchestral repertoire and contemporary music. Milo went on to study with Kraft’s own teacher, Saul Goodman, at the Juilliard School.

=== New York ===
In 1975, Milo was accepted into the Juilliard School to study timpani and percussion with Saul Goodman and Elden C. “Buster” Bailey. At the same time and also at Juilliard, he began studying composition and contemporary music analysis with Stanley Wolfe, who encouraged him while writing his first pieces.

Between 1975 and 1981 he worked in numerous orchestras and ensembles at Juilliard and as a freelance percussionist in New York City and outlying areas. He was percussionist and timpanist in the Greenwich Symphony Orchestra during these years.

At Juilliard, he worked with conductors such as Sixten Ehrling, Leonard Bernstein, Georg Solti, Herbert von Karajan, Pierre Boulez and Myung-Whun Chung.

Milo also performed at places like The Kitchen, presenting early minimal, improvised and aleatoric contemporary music. Attending workshops in the dance studio of Merce Cunningham he was influenced by the ideas of Cunningham and John Cage.

Milo received his Master of Music Degree from Juilliard School in 1980.

=== Israel ===
In 1981 he was invited to take the position of principal timpanist and percussionist with the Israel Sinfonietta Orchestra, Beer-Sheva. Between 1981 and 1984, he worked with conductors like Mendi Rodan, Jean-Pierre Rampal, Paul Tortelier, Zubin Mehta, Isaac Stern and Karsten Andersen.

Throughout this period he was a Student of composer Tzvi Avni, who composed the solo percussion piece “5 Variations for Mister K.” for Milo's Tel-Aviv Museum recital in 1983.

Milo played hundreds of concerts with the Israel Sinfonietta Orchestra, the Jerusalem Symphony Orchestra, Tel-Aviv Chamber Orchestra, as well as performing as soloist and in ensembles at the Israel Festival and at the Tel-Aviv Museum recital series.

In 1984 he sent off his music to Luciano Berio. Berio invited him to Florence for a meeting and put him in contact with Leonard Stein in Los Angeles.

=== Los Angeles ===
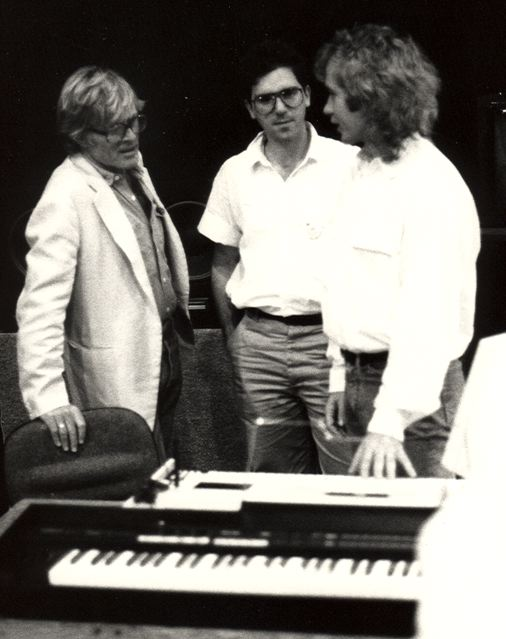
from left to right: Actor Robert Redford, Leon Milo, Peter Kaye

In the summer of 1984, Milo moved back to Los Angeles to work with Leonard Stein. From 1984 to 1989, Milo studied privately with Stein.

Stein was Arnold Schoenberg's teaching assistant in the 1940s, an important interpreter of Schoenberg music and director of the Schoenberg Institute (at the USC). As a Professor, he encouraged generations of composers to develop their own ideas. Among his others students was notably, La Monte Young.

A year later, he was accepted to the composer's workshop at the Aspen Music Festival where he studied with Luciano Berio, Jacob Druckman, Earle Brown and Morton Subotnick.

He began to take part in the LA music scene, first by joining the Independent Composers Association for whom he wrote “Antiphon” and “Hei-Kyo-Ku”. He played regularly with the Santa Barbara Symphony, Ventura Symphony Orchestra and The San Bernardino Symphony. He performed often at the Monday Evening Concerts with the “XTET” ensemble, which he co-founded.

In 1986, after two years of study with Leonard Stein, he was commissioned to write a piece for the LA Philharmonic new music ensemble, by the composer in residence John Harbison.

Milo was accepted as a Composer Fellow at the Sundance Institute Composer's Lab in 1987.

=== Paris ===
Milo moved to Paris with a Fulbright Fellowship for composition in 1989. That year, he studied privately with Gilbert Amy and attended master classes at the American School in Fontainebleau with Tristan Murail and Betsy Jolas.

In 1990, he received the Nadia and Lily Boulanger grant for composition during which time he wrote a work for large orchestra (Quintrillium) for the Ventura County Symphony Orchestra. The piece was commissioned by Leonard Stein and Betty Freeman. The premier was conducted by Leonard Stein. Also on the program was the Arnold Schoenberg’s Violin Concerto (Op. 36) with Rose Mary Harbison as soloist.

In the mid-nineties, he started to work on computer assisted composition, studying electronic music at the ateliers UPIC with Curtis Roads and Gérard Pape. He wrote his first electronic piece TimeTexture in that period.

Milo shares a long artistic partnership with designer/artist Arik Levy which began with creating music and sound design for Levy's films in 1995. Following, were numerous collaborations such as Levy's Pompidou Art Center installation, Love Counts and Osmosis for the SWAROVSKI CRYSTAL PALACE in Milan.

In 1998, he was accepted into the IRCAM Curses for composition.

Leon Milo composed Mexico for the Trio d'Argent in 2002 and soon after began developing interactive programming for live performance. He devised many interactive sequences in collaboration with Francois Daudin Clavaud for the Trio d'argent and dancer on tightrope for performances for a contemporary music evening called El Horizonte. In 2005, they played El Horizonte at the UNAM for the Festival Musica Y Escena in Mexico City.

Leon Milo and Francois Daudin Clavaud later founded Interact-Son., a duo for flute and live electronics.

Starting in 1992, he began composing film scores for European film and television. He has worked extensively since then for channels such as Arte, France 2, France 3, Canal+, among others.

He created music and sound design for the 3D animated short fiction entitled “The Last Minute” , by Nicolas Salis. The film was an Official Selection at the Cannes Film Festival in 2004 and won the prize for best music and sound design at the European Short Film Festival FEC Reus in 2005.

=== Recent work and projects ===
2005, Milo was commissioned by the Festival Île-de-France and the Trio d'Argent to write a piece for 3 percussionists, 3 flutists and live electronics. The composition of the new piece, "TranseSept, was financed by an award from the SACEM and was premiered in Paris.

2006 Milo was Artist in Residence at the United Sardine Factory in Bergen, Norway. 2007, he was soloist at the Borealis Contemporary Music Festival in Norway. Founded in 2004 Bergen's Borealis Contemporary Music Festival is a significant festival for contemporary music and experimental sound. His work consisted of an 8 hour improvised electronic work based on sounds brought to him by the public.

2007, Susanne Kessel, pianist and Leon Milo [electronics and percussion) founded "PIANOWAVES". Their first performances were for the renowned International Beethovenfest in Bonn in that year.

His transcription of the song I Miss You by Björk for piano and electronics was recorded on the Solo CD ICELAND by Susanne Kessel in 2007 as well.

Kessel and Milo also work with other artists such as the American saxophonist Demetrius Spaneas. 2008 they performed together at the Beethoven-Haus Bonn, which is a concert hall built at the birthplace of Ludwig van Beethoven.

In honor of French composer Olivier Messiaen's 100th birthday in 2008, Susanne Kessel conceived a program presented by "PIANOWAVES" at the International Beethovenfest. For this occasion Milo composed five soundscapes. These works based on various facets of Messian's music and his passions such as nature, religion, birdsong, ethnic percussion and improvisation.

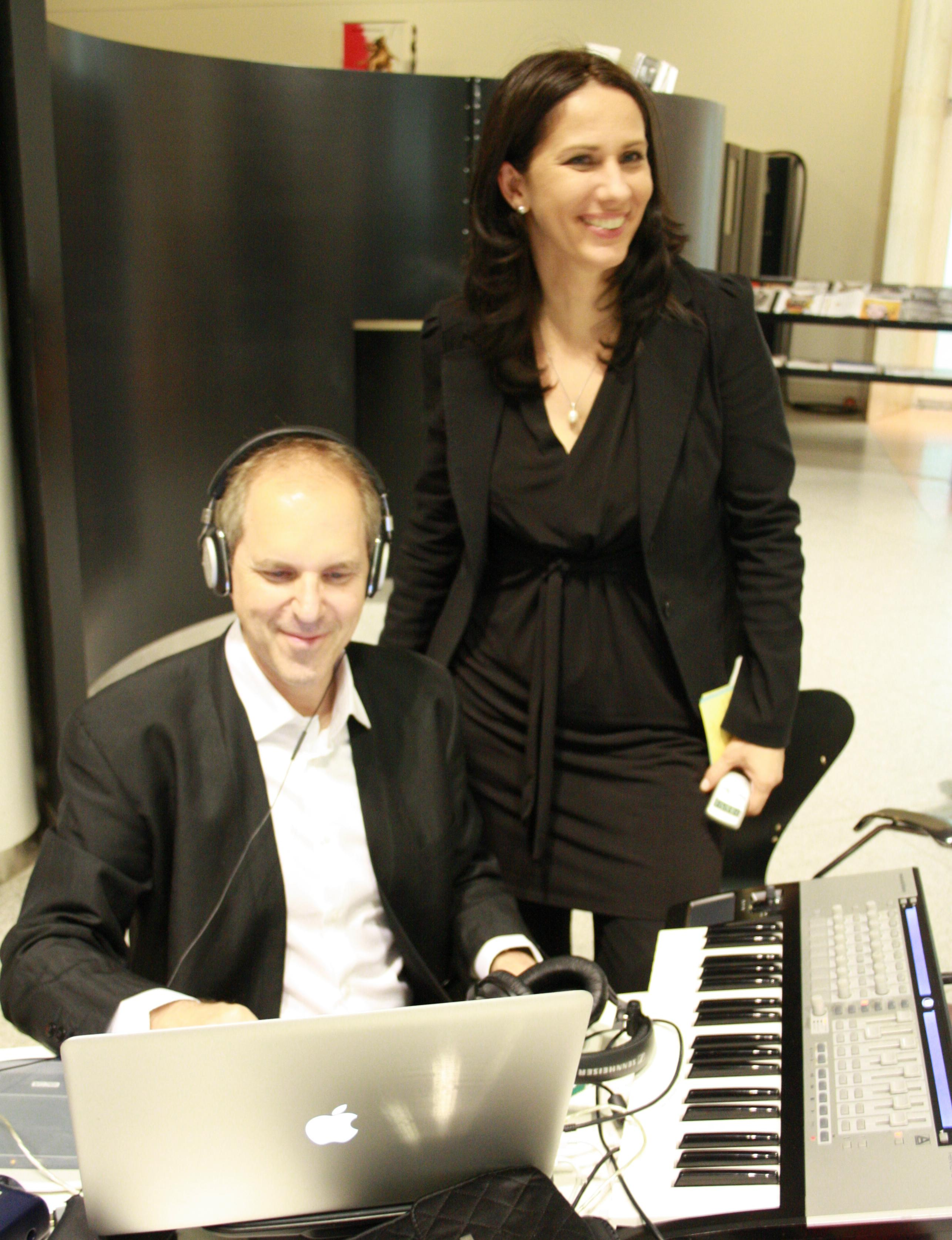
Live performance of Duo "Pianowaves" - Leon Milo and Susanne Kessel at a public "Musicircus" (by John Cage) at Beethovenfest 2012 in Bonn (Germany).

It is worth mentioning that Milo returned to the Aspen Music Festival in 2008, after having attended composition workshops as a student in 1985. This time he was engaged to be music consultant for live webcast for Medici Arts on medici.tv.

In September 2009, Milo and Francois Daudin Clavaud played their interactive performance entitled “Sound Gardens” numerous times in Mexico. Notable performances of the duo Interact-Son took place at the Festival Musica Y Escena in Mexico City and the Festival Mediarte / Arte y Nuevas Tecnologías in Monterrey. The interactive video shown at the performance was made by Miguel Chevalier.

He composed the music for two films featuring Nobel Prize Economist, Joseph Stiglitz, directed by Jacques Sarasin. “Where Is the World Going, Mr. Stiglitz? ” a video documentary from 2007, and the TV documentary “Around the World with Joseph Stiglitz: Perils and Promises of Globalization” (Original title: “Le monde selon Stiglitz”) from 2009, that was produced by Arte.

2009, his duo partner, Susanne Kessel, commissioned 12 international composers to write original works for her CD project “An Robert Schumann” (dedicated to Robert Schumann). Based on the 5th Kreisleriana fantasy of Schumann, Milo composed his Fantasie Electroacoustique for R.S. and S.K. for Kessel. Other contributing composers were Alex Shapiro, Alvin Lucier, Michael Denhoff, Ulrike Haage, Christoph Israel, Moritz Eggert, Ivan Sokolov, Mike Lang.

2010, he toured with Interact-Son throughout Angola in Africa, at the request of the Fondation Alliance Française.

2011, Interact-Son performed at the 7th Festival Présence Électronique presented by Le Groupe de Recherches Musicales.

2012, Milo wrote the original music for a ten-part fiction based on the novel Pedro Páramo produced by Radio France.

== Works ==
- Shinui - for marimba (1985), premiered at Los Angeles Harbor College, USA
- Trio - for clarinet, violin and cello (1986)
- Antiphon - for two flutes, clarinet, bass clarinet, string quartet and piano (1986), premiered at Los Angeles Harbor College, conducted by Lucas Richman, commissioned by the Independent Composers Association
- Hei-Kyo-Ku - soprano and 18 instruments (1987), premiered by USC New Music Ensemble, conducted by Donald Crockett, commissioned by Independent Composers Association, Los Angeles. (It was written for the Japan-America Theater where it was performed in March 1987.)
- Verset - for 10 Instruments (1988), premiered by Los Angeles Philharmonic New Music Ensemble, conducted by David Alan Miller, commissioned by John and Rose Mary Harbison
- Solo for Cello (1990), premiered by Vincent Segal at the American Embassy in Paris
- Quintrillium - for large Orchestra (1991), premiered by the Ventura County Symphony Orchestra, conducted by Leonard Stein, commissioned by Leonard Stein and Betty Freeman
- TimeTexture - for piano and electronics (1997), premiered by Gloria Cheng (piano) at Los Angeles Piano Spheres in 1997, commissioned by Los Angeles Piano Spheres, Leonard Stein and Betty Freeman
- Sa! - for violin solo and electronics (1999), premiered by Nicolas Miribel (violin) at Auditorium St. Germain in Paris in 1999, presented by IRCAM
- Mexico - for flute trio and electronics (2002), premiered by Trio d'Argent at the Festival 38eme Rugissants in Grenoble
- In The Air - for electronics (2003), premiered at Gallery Sentou, Paris, commissioned by Arik Levy
- L’Amour en Cage - for cello, live electronics and tightrope dancer (2004), premiered at Carré Magique in Lannion, France
- TranseSept - for three flutes, three percussionists and live electronics (2005), premiered in Vincennes, near Paris, by Trio d’Argent (Paris) and the trio Sete Portas (Salvador de Bahia) at the Festival Île-de-France, commissioned by the SACEM
- Stellar Blue - for piano and electronics (2006), premiered by Susanne Kessel at the Beethoven House in Bonn
- Résonances - for electronics (2006), premiered at Enghien les Bains, commissioned by Arik Levy
- I Miss You - Transcription for piano and electronics Björk/Milo (2007), commissioned by Susanne Kessel
- Birdscape - for prerecorded sounds and electronics (2008), premiered at the Beethovenfest in Bonn/Germany, performed with Susanne Kessel (Pianist) as PIANOWAVES
- Pariscape - for prerecorded sounds and electronics (2008), premiered at the Beethovenfest in Bonn/Germany, performed with Susanne Kessel as PIANOWAVES
- Voicescape - for electronics (2008), premiered at the Beethovenfest in Bonn/Germany, performed with Susanne Kessel as PIANOWAVES
- Sound Gardens - for flute, live electronics and interactive video (2009), premiered at the Musica Y Escena, Mexico, in collaboration with Francois Daudin Clavaud, interactive video was made by Miguel Chevalier.
- Fantasie Electro-Acoustique for R.S. & S.K. - for sampled piano solo and electronics (2010), commissioned by Susanne Kessel
- Huiteme Porte - for flute trio and live electronics (2012) premiered at the Festival Detours de Babel in Grenoble
- Régards - for live electronics (2012), premiered at Radio France in 2012

== Sound installations ==
- Collaborations with Arik Levy, designer, for Swarovski Crystal Palace, Milan (2009) and at the Slott Gallery, Paris (2010).
- Centre Des Arts, (with Arik Levy, designer) Enghein (2007),
- Borealis Festival, Bergen (2007).
- Jardin de Luxemborg (2007)
- «ArtSenat» with Florence Bost Designer, Paris (2007),
- Centre Pompidou Paris (2005)
- Video et design sonore, avec Nataliya Lyakh Photographe, Fiac Paris (2004)
- Gallery Sentou, avec Arik Levy, Designer, Paris (2002)
- La Maison Saint Victoire Présentation multimedia, Aix en Provence, France (1996)
- Le Musée Archéologique de Saint Romain en Gal, Audioguidage Vienne, France (1994)
- Interact-Sound Duo concert with Francois Daudin Clavaud at the Musica y Escena Festival, Mexico City (2009).

== Artistic direction ==
- Music consultant for Medici Arts and Ideale Audience for live streaming broadcast of the Aspen Music Festival, (2008).
