= Fools (EP) =

EP by Lauren Aquilina
- Released: 22 October 2012
- Genre: Indie pop
- Length: 16:09
- Label: Self-released
- Producer: Daniel Goudie

Lauren Aquilina chronology
Fools (2012)	Sinners (2013)

Fools is the debut extended play by English singer-songwriter Lauren Aquilina, self-released on 22 October 2012. Without record label support, independent funding, radio support or any PR, the EP reached number 10 in the main UK iTunes album chart, peaking ahead of many releases from major labels during that week. The title track "Fools" also reached number 72 in the official UK singles chart, making her the only English artist to achieve an official chart placement in 2012.

== Reception ==
Fools received critical acclaim upon its release in 2012, Aquilina's loyal fanbase guided her to becoming the biggest selling independent artist in the UK in 2012 with this single release. The title track "Fools" was chosen for BBC Radio 1's 'BBC Introducing Playlist', where the song was played on daytime radio throughout January 2013. During this time, the EP received positive responses from Greg James, Jen Long and Huw Stephens.

== Track listing ==
All tracks are written by Lauren Aquilina and Daniel Goudie, and produced by Goudie.

No.	Title	Length
1.	"Fools"	3:33
2.	"Lilo"	3:41
3.	"King"	3:58
4.	"Wonder"	3:58

== Tour ==
In February 2013, Aquilina performed her first ever set of headline shows to support the EP's release. The 4-date tour sold-out completely within 2 days of sale.
