= The Sin =

The Sin may refer to:

- The Sin (1965 film), an Egyptian drama film
- The Sin (2004 film), a Thai film
- White Sister, also known as The Sin, a 1972 Italian comedy film
- The Sin (Lossow), an 1880 painting by Heinrich Lossow drawing inspiration from the Banquet of Chestnuts
- The Sin (Stuck), an 1893 painting by Franz Stuck
- "Chapter 3: The Sin", an episode of The Mandalorian

== See also ==
- Sin (disambiguation)
