= Khaldin =

Khaldin or Khaledin or Khaledeyn (Persian: خالدين) may refer to:

- Khaledeyn, Hormozgan
- Khaldin, Qazvin
