= Elden (name) =

Elden is a given name and surname. Notable people with the name include:

== Given name ==
- Elden Auker (1910–2006), American Major League Baseball pitcher
- Elden C. Bailey (1922–2004), American percussionist
- D. Elden Beck (1906–1967), American professor of zoology and entomology
- Elden Benge (1904–1960), American symphony orchestra principal trumpet player, trumpet designer and manufacturer and company founder
- Elden Campbell (1968–2025), American basketball player
- Elden Francis Curtiss (born 1932), American prelate of the Roman Catholic Church
- Elden Henson (born 1977), American actor
- Elden H. Johnson (1921–1944), United States Army soldier posthumously awarded the Medal of Honor
- Elden Kingston (1909–1948), American founder of the Davis County Cooperative Society, a fundamentalist denomination within the Latter Day Saint movement
- Elden Mills (1908–1965), American politician

== Surname ==
- Bård Jørgen Elden (born 1968), Norwegian Nordic combined skier
- John Christian Elden (born 1967), Norwegian barrister and politician
- Marte Elden (born 1986), Norwegian cross-country skier
- Spencer Elden (born 1991), who sued because his baby picture was used for the cover of the Nirvana album Nevermind
- Trond Einar Elden (born 1970), Norwegian Nordic combined skier

== See also ==
- Kristen van Elden (born 1981), Australian former tennis player
- Eldin, given name and surname
- Eldon (given name)
- Eldon (surname)
