= Eldon (surname) =

Eldon is a surname which may refer to:

- Dan Eldon (1970-1993), former British photojournalist stoned to death by a mob in Mogadishu
- David Eldon (born 1945), former chairman of The Hong Kong and Shanghai Banking Corporation
- Kevin Eldon (born 1960), English actor and comedian
- Stan Eldon (born 1936), British former cross-country champion
- Stewart Eldon, British former diplomat, former ambassador to Ireland and ambassador to NATO
- Þor Eldon, Icelandic/American singer, member of The Sugarcubes

== See also ==
- Eldin, given name and surname
- Elden (name)
