= Šín =

Šín (feminine: Šínová) is a Czech surname. It was probably derived from the German adjective schön ('beautiful', 'nice') or from the Middle High German word schin ('shine','glow'). It was therefore created based on the appearance of the bearer of the surname. Notable people with the surname include:

- Matěj Šín (born 2004), Czech footballer
- Matylda Růžičková-Šínová (1933–2025), Czech gymnast
- Otakar Šín (1881–1943), Czech composer, theoretician and pedagogue
