= Old Eldon =

Village in County Durham, England

Coordinates: 54.645°N 1.616°W

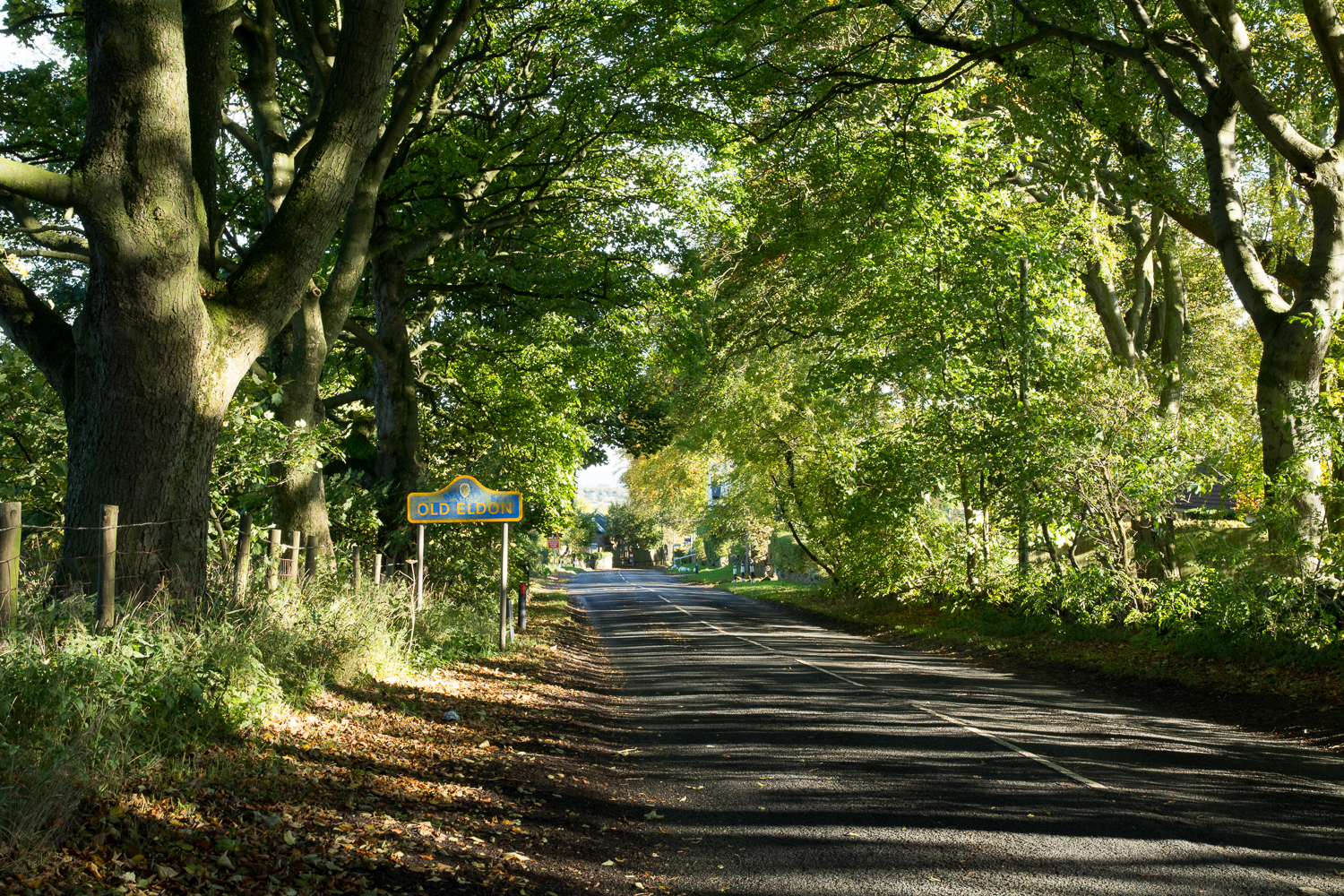
Entering Old Eldon

Old Eldon is a village in County Durham, in England. It is situated a short distance to the east of Bishop Auckland.
