= Eldon Lane =

Village in County Durham, England

Coordinates: 54°38′41.85″N 1°38′55.64″W

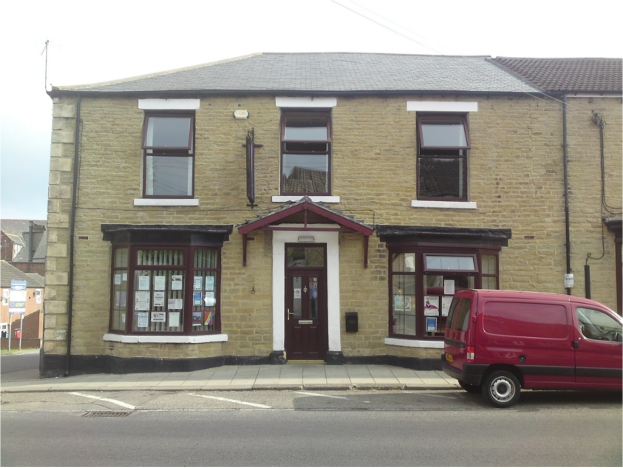
- One Stop Shop

- Location within County Durham
- Population: 394 (2001 census)
- Civil parish: Dene Valley
- Unitary authority: County Durham
- Ceremonial county: County Durham
- Region: North East
- Country: England
- Sovereign state: United Kingdom

Eldon Lane is a village in County Durham, in England. It is situated a few miles south-west of Bishop Auckland, a short distance from Shildon. In 2021 it had a population of 998.

== 2025 Tornado ==
Eldon came to attention in July 2025 after being hit by a rare IF0.5 Tornado, causing roof damage to sheds and houses, as well as ripping up fences and causing other minor damage. The tornado was the first recorded in the Historic County since 2007, and the strongest tornado since 1998.
