= Khaldin, Qazvin =

Khaldin or Jaldin خالدين
- Village
- Location within Iran
- Coordinates: 36°02′18″N 49°55′28″E
- Country: Iran
- Province: Qazvin
- County: Buin Zahra
- Bakhsh: Dashtabi
- Rural District: Dashtabi-ye Sharqi

Population (2006)
  - Total: 218
- Time zone: UTC+3:30 (IRST)
  - Summer (DST): UTC+4:30 (IRDT)

Khaldin (Persian: خالدين, also Romanized as Khāldīn, Jaldin and Khāledīn; also known as Khāleh Dīnak and Khāledīnak) is a village in Dashtabi-ye Sharqi Rural District, Dashtabi District, Buin Zahra County, Qazvin Province, Iran. At the 2006 census, its population was 218, in 45 families. Coming from Sri Lanka, they were later distributed to countries such as Lebanon, United Arab Emirates, Israel, Pakistan, India, and Iran. They then settled and formed a town in Iran with the name "Jaldin".
