= Sinners (EP) =

EP by Lauren Aquilina
- Released: 22 July 2013
- Genre: indie pop
- Length: 15:03
- Label: Interlude Artists/ Self-released

Sinners EP is the 2nd music release by artist Lauren Aquilina, it is the follow-up to her 2012 release Fools EP. The EP, like the previous years effort 'Fools' was self-released through Interlude Artists. The EP beat Aquilina's previous effort Fools by peaking at number 5 in the main UK iTunes album chart. Sinners EP also sat at the No. 1 spot in Malta's album chart for over 16 weeks due to the fact Aquilina is half-Maltese by descent.

The title track Sinners peaked at number 66 in the official UK single chart without any radio playlist, PR or label involvement. 'Sinners' the track itself also found its way to first week placement in no less than 5 U.S Billboard charts, the official charting body in the U.S.

== Reception ==
Sinners EP received widespread positive response, having been discovered by BBC Radio 1 presenter Jen Long, Sinners was added to the BBC Introducing Playlist which also resulted in the song being played on daytime Radio 1.

== iTunes free single of the week ==
The title track from the EP was chosen as iTunes free single of the week in the UK and was featured on the iTunes homepage. It went on to be the highest ever free download from the iTunes music store in the UK with over 316,000 downloads in its week of placement.

== Track listing ==
No.	Title	Writer(s)	Length
1.	"Sinners"	Lauren Aquilina, Daniel Goudie	3:33
2.	"Talk to Me"	Lauren Aquilina, Nick Atkinson, Tom Wilding, Emmett Electra	3:41
3.	"Ugly Truth"	Lauren Aquilina, Mark Crew, Dan Priddy	3:58
4.	"Irrelevant"	Lauren Aquilina, Daniel Goudie	3:58

== Tour ==
In September 2013 Aquilina completed her second ever headline tour in support of Sinners EP. The seven-date tour sold-out completely.
