= Aldine =

Aldine is an adjective pertaining to Renaissance printer Aldus Manutius, including the renowned publications and typography of the Aldine Press he founded in 1494. It is used synonymously with the Garalde classification of typefaces.

Aldine may also refer to:

- Aldine, Indiana, an unincorporated community in Starke County
- Aldine, New Jersey, an unincorporated community in Salem County
- Aldine, Texas, a census-designated place in unincorporated Harris County, adjacent to Houston
- Aldine Independent School District, serving portions of Harris County and Houston, Texas
- Aldine Edition of the British Poets, a series reprinting classic works, first begun in 1830
- The Aldine, a monthly American art journal published in New York from 1868 to 1879
- Aldine roman, alternate name for the typeface Bembo
- Ruth Aldine, alter ego of X-Men mutant Blindfold, a character in Marvel comics
