= Eldon Square =

Eldon Square may refer to:

- Eldon Square, Reading, an urban square and public park in the English borough of Reading
- Old Eldon Square, a square in the English city of Newcastle-upon Tyne, formerly known as Eldon Square
  - Eldon Square Shopping Centre, a shopping centre built around Old Eldon Square
  - Eldon Square Bus Station, a bus station adjacent to Old Eldon Square
