= Eldon (given name) =

Eldon is a masculine given name. It may refer to:

== People ==
- Eldon Bargewell (1947–2019), American general
- Eldon Danenhauer (1935–2021), American football player
- Eldon Davis (1917–2011), American architect
- Eldon Dedini (1921–2006), American cartoonist
- Eldon Edwards (1909–1960), American Ku Klux Klan leader
- Eldon Fortie (1941–2021), American football player
- Eldon Garnet (born 1946), Canadian artist and novelist
- Eldon Grier (1917–2001), Canadian poet and artist
- Eldon Gorst (1861–1911), British diplomat
- Eldon Griffiths (1925–2014), British politician and journalist
- Eldon C. Hall, American computer engineer
- Eldon Hoke (1958–1997), American musician
- Eldon Jenne (1899–1993), American pole vaulter and sports coach
- Eldon Arthur Johnson (1919–2001), Canadian politician
- Eldon Lautermilch (1949–2026), Canadian politician
- Eldon Maquemba (born 1984), Angolan footballer
- Eldon Miller (born 1939), American basketball coach
- Eldon A. Money (1933–2010), American politician and radio journalist
- Eldon Nelson (1927–2012), American jockey
- Eldon Nygaard (born 1946), American politician from South Dakota
- Eldon Rathburn (1916–2008), Canadian composer
- Pokey Reddick (born 1964), Canadian hockey player
- Eldon Rudd (1920–2002), American politician from Arizona
- Eldon Shamblin (1916–1998), American guitarist and arranger
- Eldon Smith, Canadian cardiologist
- Eldon Woolliams (1916–2001), Canadian politician

== Fictional characters ==
- Eldon Chance, on the American TV series Chance
- Eldon Tyrell, in the film Blade Runner

== See also ==
- Elden (name), given name and surname
- Eldin, given name and surname
