= Arik Levy =

Israeli artist and industrial designer

Arik Levy אריק לוי
- Born: Arik Levy; 1963 (age 62–63); Tel-Aviv, Israel.
- Education: Art Center Europe in Switzerland, Graduated with distinction in 1991.
- Known for: Artist
- Notable work: RockGrowth at Hermitage Moscow 2018, RockGrowth 808 at Atomium, Brussels; CraterCorten E, Singapore

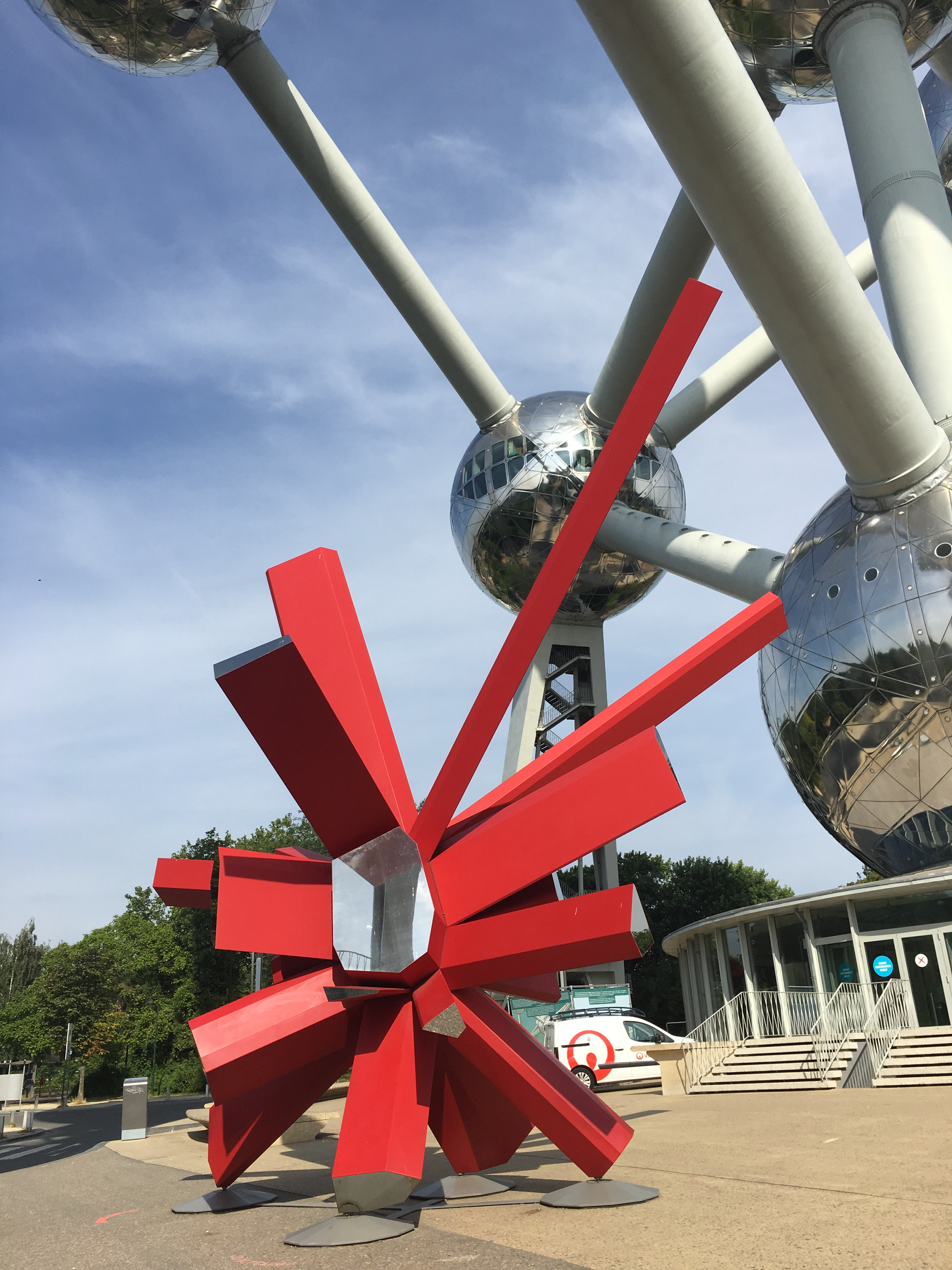
Atomium, Brussels

Arik Levy (Hebrew: אריק לוי) was born in Tel Aviv. An artist and industrial designer, he attended the Art Center Europe in Switzerland where he graduated with distinction in 1991. Levy employs a multi-disciplinary approach in both the art and industrial design fields. His works have been included in multiple museum collections. Levy lives and works in Paris.

== Biography ==
After graduating at Art Center College of Design (Art Center, La Tour-de-Peilz, Switzerland), Levy went to Japan where he consolidated his ideas producing products and pieces for exhibitions. He then returned to Europe where he contributed his artistry to contemporary dance and opera creating set designs. Known for his sculptures and the "Rock" series, Levy's work is collected in public and private collections. His sculpture RockGrowth Atomium 808 was acquired by Atomium in Brussels.

== Art exhibitions and installations ==
2020

- Installation of the monumental sculpture RockGrowth 2000, on Bratyev Vesninykh Boulevard, Moscow. It is 21 meters high and made of mirror polished stainless steel.

2019

- BLICKACHSEN 12, 05/2019 to 10/2019, Bad Homburg and Frankfurt Rhine-Main

2017

- Louise Alexander Gallery, Porto Cervo "Sculpture park"
- Installation of RockTripleFusion VerticalGiant 660 and RockTripleFusionGiant 500, Taipei. two monumental public sculptures commissioned to be part of the residential project Da-An Park Towers by Sir Richard Rogers, in Taipei, Taiwan.
- Baker Museum, Florida – solo exhibition – 09/2017
- Swarovski Crystal Worlds Museum, Wattens – 11/2017
- Louise Alexander Gallery, Nomad, Monaco – Solo exhibition – 04/2017
- Aeroplastic, Brussels – group exhibition – 04/2017
- Setareh gallery, Düsseldorf – I Remembered It Differently - solo exhibition – 03/2017
- Samsung, commission for BaselWorld – Galaxy Stand – 03/2017
- Jensen Gallery, Sydney – group exhibition – 03/2017

2016

- Atomium, Brussels – RockGrowth 808 Atomium – public space permanent installation – 04/2014
- Alon Segev Gallery, Tel Aviv – Absent Presence - solo exhibition – 03/11/2016
- Design Miami, Miami – Ice by Arik Levy – 12/2016
- Les Rencontres D’arles, Arles – 20/20 – Group Exhibition – 07/2016 to 09/2016
- PODGORNY ROBINSON gallery temporary space, Saint Paul de Vence – Summer group exhibition – 07/2016
- Louise Alexander Gallery, Porto Cervo "Crater"

2015

- Set decoration for the fifth season of American Horror Story
- Marlborough Gallery at Art Basel Hong Kong
- Louise Alexander Gallery, Shanghai, China – DesignShanghai 2015 – solo exhibition – 03/2015

2014

- Louise Alexander Gallery, Porto Cervo – Uncontrolled Nature – solo exhibition – 06/2014
- Ilan Engel Gallery, Paris – New Works – solo exhibition – 06/2014
- RockGrowth 808 Atomium – Atomium, Brussels - public space permanent installation and exhibition – 04/2014
- Aeroplastics Contemporary, Brussels – Full House: 100 artists – group exhibition – 04/2014
- Fondation EDF, Paris – Que la lumière soit – RewindableLight art video – 04/2014

2013

- Musée des Arts Décoratifs, Paris – AbstractRock series and other artworks alongside the exhibition “Dans la ligne de mire” – 09/2013 to 03/2014
- Vitra Museum, Weil am Rhein – RewindableLight art video – Lightopia group exhibition – 09/2013 to 03/2014
- Galerist, Istanbul – Activated Nature – solo exhibition – 11/2013
- Enclos des Bernardins, Paris – RockGrowth installation – 09/2013
- Mitterrand+Cramer, Geneva – new sculptures – solo exhibition – 03/2013
- Galerie Maubert, Paris – Nouvelle Lune – group exhibition – 04/2013
- Mitterrand+Cramer, Geneva – new sculptures – solo exhibition – 03/2013
- Alon Segev Gallery, London – Art13 London – art fair – 02/2013
- Priveekollektie, Rotterdam – Raw Art Fair – art fair – 02/2013
- Priveekollektie, Grand–Saconnex, Switzerland – Artgenève – art fair – 01/2013

2012

- Passage de Retz, Paris – Nothing is quite as it seems – solo exhibition – 11/2012
- Fondazione Bisazza, Montecchio Maggiore, Italy – Experimental growth – solo exhibition – 11/2012
- Swarovski Crystal Worlds, Wattens, Austria – Transparent Opacity – solo exhibition – 09/2012
- Galerist Tepebaş, Istanbul – Le Jardin de la Spéculation Cosmique – group exhibition – 11/2012
- Alon Segev Gallery, Tel Aviv – Genetic Intimacy – solo exhibition – 09/2012
- London Design Museum, London – Osmosis Interactive installation at Swarovski's Digital Crystal – group exhibition – 09/2012
- Jardin du Hauvel, Saint-Hymer – Art et Nature – group exhibition curated by Jean–Gabriel Mitterrand – 06/2012
- Hedge Gallery, San Francisco – Flections – group exhibition curated by Sabrina Buell – 06/2012
- Priveekollektie, Heusden aan de Maas – EmotionalDeflection – solo exhibition – 05/2012
- Galerie Maubert, Paris – Le Sacre du Printemps – group exhibition – 04/2012
- Alon Segev Gallery, Tel Aviv – Arik Levy & Guy Yanai – group exhibition – 03/2012
- Stonetouch, Geneva – Candelabra – group exhibition – Nuit des Bains – 03/2012

2011

- Natural History Museum, London – installation – Regeneration: Osmosis Chaton Superstructures at the Natural History Museum – 09/2011
- JGM. Galerie, Paris – M+C Design 2008–2011 – group exhibition – Facetmoon + WireFlowRandom + BigRock – 03/2011
- Galerie Pierre–Alain Challier, Paris – Un regard d'Obsidienne – group exhibition – Absence – 01/2011
- Design Museum Holon, Israel – Post Fossil: excavating 21st century creation – group exhibition – RockFusion + SelfArcheology – 01/2011

2010

- 21_21 Design Sight gallery, Tokyo – Reality Lab – group exhibition – Fixing Nature Log installation – 11/2010
- Alon Segev Gallery, Tel Aviv – Natural Disorder – solo exhibition – 10/2010
- Mitterrand+Cramer, Geneva – Geotectonic – solo exhibition – 09/2010
- Priveekollektie, Heusden aan de Maas, The Netherlands – My Name is Arik – solo exhibition – 09/2010
- Istanbul Modern – Log Forest – 08/2010
- Personality Disorder Social Codes installation – No Holds Barred – Art Amsterdam – 05/2010
- Eighth Veil Gallery, Los Angeles – Out there logging – solo exhibition – 05/2010
- Santa Monica Museum of Art, USA – Luminescence, between Fire & Ice – solo exhibition – 05/2010
- Lambretto Art Project, Milano – 13 798 grams of design – group exhibition – RockFusion Brass – 04/2010
- 21_21 Design Sight gallery, Tokyo – Post Fossil: excavating 21st century creation – group exhibition – RockFusion and SelfArcheology – 04/2010

2009

- Slott Gallery, Paris – Confessions – group exhibition Préliminaires – 12/2009
- Kenny Schachter/ROVE, London – Fruit & Flowers – group exhibition 10/2009
- Vienna Design Week, Vienna – Arik Levy & Swarovski Osmosis Chaton Superstructures at the Liechtenstein Museum and TableScape architectural Jewellery at Sotheby's – 10/2009
- Swarovski Crystal Palace, Ex Magazzini di Porta Genova Milano – Osmosis – 04/2009
- Oratorio Basilica di S. Ambrogio, Milano – Prophets & Penitents, Confessions of a Chair – group exhibition– Identity Disorder chair – 04/2009
- Galleria Nina Lumer, Milano – Love Design – group exhibition – Powered by JimmyJane – 04/2009

2008

- Design Miami, Miami – Beyond Organic: Design In the State of Nature – group exhibition – 12/2008
- Kenny Schachter/ROVE, London – Diversion – group exhibition – 11/2008
- Chatsworth, UK – Beyond Limits – group exhibition – Log Corner + Log Corner Grid – 09/2008
- Sudeley Castle, UK – The Artist's Playground – group exhibition – Moon Tables – 06/2008
- Wright20, Chicago, IL – Absent Nature – 04/2008
- Barbara Davis Gallery, Houston, TX – Imperative Design – group exhibition – 01/2008
- Galerie Alain Gutharc, Paris – Propositions lumineuses 2 – group exhibition – 01/2008

2007

- Galerie NumerisCausa, Paris – Il était une fois... – group exhibition for the gallery's opening – Shine light sculpture – 12/2007
- The Mews Gallery by Rabih Hage, London – Sitting Pretty – exhibition of photos by Jonathan Root, featuring a portrait of Arik Levy with his creation Identity Disorder – 09/2007
- Dialogues méditerranéens, St. Tropez – Big Rock – installation – 07/2007
- Centre des arts, Enghien–les–Bains – L’Autre – 01/2007

2006

- Drugstore Publicis, Paris – MiniMaxi – installation – 09/2006
- Baccarat, Paris – Phantom – installation – Designer's Days 06/2006
- Passage de Retz, Paris – Big Rock – permanent installation – 05/2006
- Centre culturel français, Milan – République Libre du Design – installation Organ – 04/2006

2005

- Passage de Retz / Mouvements modernes, Paris – Du Bois Don't On Se Chauffe – 12/2005
- Gallery Alain Gutharc – Propositions lumineuses – 2005–2006
- Centre Georges Pompidou, Paris – D.Day – installation From primitive to virtual – 06/2005
- Garanti Gallery, Istanbul – Feel before you see – 05/2005
- National Glass Centre/Glass Gallery, Sunderland, UK – Brilliant – 02/2005

2004

- Park Ryusook Gallery, Korea – Love counts – 09/2004
- Victoria & Albert Museum, London – Brilliant – 02/2004

2002

- Hertzlia Museum, Israel Video Zone Biennale – Two stars hotel – in collaboration with Sigalit Landau, 2002

2001

- Pascale Cottard–Ollsson Gallery, Stockholm – personal exhibition – 11/2001

2000

- Isart Contemporary Art Gallery, Munich – Virtual light – 2000
- Isart Contemporary Art Gallery, Munich – Virtual/Religious’ – 2000

1997

- Sculpture Biennale Ein Hod, Israel – Humanism 2020 – 1997

1996

- Louisiana Museum, Danemark – Design og identitet – 1996

1986

- Sculpture Park, Jaffa, Israel – 1986

== Museum collections ==
- The Art Institute of Chicago, Chicago – Contemporary Domestic Confessional – 2010
- Centre Georges Pompidou, Paris – Installation Fractal Cloud – 2006
- Seoul Arts Center, Hangaram Design Museum, Seoul – Umbilical Light – 2005
- Centre Georges Pompidou, Paris – Xm3 duo, Light pocket, Alchemy tube lights – 2002
- HSBC Connection Collection / Volume 1 – Rockshelves + Rocksplit – 2009

== Competitions and awards ==
2014

- Design Plus powered by Light+Building 2014 award: Best of Design Plus - Wireflow pendants by Arik Levy for Vibia – Frankfurt
- Wallpaper* Design Awards 2014 – Best line work – Wireflow pendants by Arik Levy for Vibia – London

2013

- Best of Year 2013 awards/INTERIOR DESIGN : category Lighting: Floor and Sconce – Fold lighting collection by Arik Levy for Vibia – USA

2011

- Good Design award: Emu Pattern collection for Coalesse – USA
- Design Plus powered by ISH 2011 award: best product – Structure collection for Inbani – Frankfurt

2010

- Grand Prix Stratégies du Design 2010: best Branding Packaging – bottle A Scent for Issey Miyake – Paris

2009

- Red Dot Design Award: best product design 2009 – SH05 ARIE shelving system by E15 – Essen
- The Interior Innovation Award, category “Best of the Best” – SH05 Arie shelving system by E15 – Köln
- Wallpaper* Design Awards 2009 – Best new beds – Landscape by Arik Levy for Verardo – Italy
- Wallpaper* Design Awards 2009 – Best shelving – Fluid by Arik Levy for Desalto – Italy

2008

- JANUS Award for Industry, design and innovation 2008 – Log Light by Saasz – Paris
- Label VIA, Torch table lamp by Baccarat – France, 2008
- Red Dot Design Award: best product design 2008 – Mistic collection by Gaia & Gino – Essen, Germany
- ELLE Decoration International Design Awards 2008 – Designer of the year

2008

- Wallpaper* Design Awards 2007 – Best modular furniture – Cubic Meter by A. Levy for Kenny Schachter – London
- Design PLUS Award 2008, Mitos glassware collection by Kvetna – Frankfurt
- Globes de Cristal Award Arts et Culture 2008 Paris Première – Best Designer – Paris

2007

- JANUS Award for Industry, design and innovation 2007, Invisible system by Visplay – Paris
- Wallpaper* Design Awards 2007, Furniture designer of the year, finalist – London
- Wallpaper* Design Awards 2007 – Best centerpiece – Mistic collection by Gaia & Gino – London

2006

- Design PLUS Award 2006, Mistic vase by Gaia&Gino

2005

- The Interior Innovation Award, category “Best detail” 4to8 table by Desalto – Köln
- The Interior Innovation Award, category “Best detail” Liko glass table by Desalto – Köln
- Elle Decoration magazine Design Award for lighting (2nd edition)

2003

- The Interior Innovation Award, category “Best of the Best” Liko table by Desalto – Köln

2002

- Prix de l’Observeur du Design/APCI, Arik sofa by Ligne Roset – France
- Grand Prix de la Presse Internationale de la Critique du Meuble Contemporain, Arik sofa by Ligne Roset – France, 2002
- Label VIA, Arik sofa by Ligne Roset – France, 2002

2001

- Cartier international office furniture and light system in collaboration with Vitra
- Label VIA, Slim stacking chair by Ligne Roset – France, 2001
- George Nelson Award, Interior magazine, 2001

2000

- Label Via, U cd shelf by Ligne Roset – France, 2000
- iF Award light fixtures – Germany, 2000
- L'Express Best of category Light – France, 2000
- Carte blanche VIA – France

1999

- Label VIA, Light Pocket lamp by Ligne Roset – France
- Grand Prix de la Presse Internationale de la Critique du Meuble Contemporain, Cloud lamp – France
- Design PLUS Award 1999, Ambiente Fair, Seed porcelaine lamp – Frankfurt

1997

- Mouvement français de la qualité – posters for “Qualité 97” campaign – Paris, 1997

1991

- Seiko Epson (International Art Center Award) – Japan, 1991
