= Designblok =

Annual design festival in Prague

Designblok is a design festival held in Prague, Czech Republic annually in October since 1999.

== History ==
The festival was inspired by Milan Design Week. The first edition of the festival in 1999 had fourteen participants, and was aimed at people working in the design industry. It has grown to about 200 participants and 30,000 visitors.

== Venues ==
The festival is held at a main venue, Superstudio, which is a different place for each edition, together with a number of other venues in Prague.
