= Sinner =

A sinner refers to a person who commits a sin.

Sinner or The Sinner may also refer to:

== People ==
- Carl Ahasver von Sinner (1754–1821), Swiss architect
- George A. Sinner (1928–2018), American politician, 29th Governor of North Dakota
- George B. Sinner, American politician
- Jannik Sinner (born 2001), Italian tennis player
- Martin Sinner (born 1968), German tennis player
- Mat Sinner (born 1964), German musician

== Arts and entertainment ==
=== Film and TV ===
- The Sinful Woman, also known as The Sinner, a 1916 Italian film
- The Sinner (1928 film), a German silent drama film
- The Sinner (1940 film), an Italian drama film
- The Sinner (1951 film), a German drama film
- The Sinner (1975 film), an Italian drama film
- Sinner, a 1972 Spanish film directed by Jesús Franco, aka Intimate Diary of a Nymphomaniac
- La ragazza dalla pelle di luna, also known as The Sinner, a 1973 Italian film
- Sinner (2007 film), a film starring Nick Chinlund and Georgina Cates
- Sinner (2026 film), an upcoming South Korean drama film
- The Sinner (TV series), an anthology series based on the novel of the same name by Petra Hammesfahr

=== Literature ===
- Sinner (Dekker novel), a 2008 fantasy book by Ted Dekker
- Sinner (Douglass novel), a 1997 fantasy novel by Sara Douglass
- Sinner (Rulli book), a 2011 religious book by Lino Rulli
- The Sinner (novel), a 2003 novel by Tess Gerritsen
- The Sinner, a 2003 novel by Madeline Hunter

=== Music ===
- Sinner (band), a German heavy metal band
- "Sinner" (Judas Priest song), 1977
- Sinner (Drowning Pool album), 2001
- "Sinner" (Drowning Pool song), 2002
- "Sinner" (Neil Finn song), 1998
- Sinner (Joan Jett album), 2006
- "Sinner" (Andy Grammer song), 2014
- Sinner (Aaron Lewis album), 2016
- "Sinner" (The Last Dinner Party song), 2023

=== Video games ===
- Sinner: Sacrifice for Redemption, a 2018 action game

== Other uses ==
- SS-16 Sinner, the NATO reporting name for the RT-21 Temp 2S intercontinental ballistic missile

== See also ==
- Siner (disambiguation)
- Sinnar, a city in Maharashtra, India
- Sinnar taluka, Maharashtra, India
- Sinners (disambiguation)
