= Eldin =

Male given name

- Gender: Male

Other gender
- Feminine: Eldina

Origin
- Meaning: Religion, faith, creed

Other names
- Variant form: Aldin

Eldin is a masculine given name and surname.

In the Southeastern Europe, Eldin is popular among Bosniaks in the former Yugoslav nations. The name is a modification to the suffix component ad-Din, and it holds the same meanings of religion, faith, creed. These countries also have a female equivalent: Eldina (for example, Eldina Ahmić).

== Given name ==
- Eldin Adilović (born 1986), Bosnian footballer
- Eldin Džogović (born 2003), Luxembourgish footballer
- Eldin Hadžić (born 1991), Bosnian footballer
- Eldin Huseinbegović (born 1978), Bosnian singer-songwriter
- Eldin Jakupović (born 1984), Bosnian-Swiss footballer
- Eldin Karisik (born 1983), Bosnian-Swedish footballer
- Eldin Lolić (born 2004), Bosnian footballer

== Surname ==
- Dzulmi Eldin (born 1960), mayor of Medan, North Sumatra
- Mohammed Eldin (born 1985), Sudanese footballer
- Mohamed Bahaa Eldin (born 1947), Egyptian politician
- Mohamed Hossam Eldin (born 2001), Egyptian footballer
- Peter Eldin (born 1939), British author and magician

== Fictional characters ==
- Eldin the Wanderer, in the Cthulhu Mythos story cycle

== See also ==
- John Clerk of Eldin (1728–1812), a figure in the Scottish Enlightenment, remembered for his writings on naval tactics in the Age of Sail
  - John Clerk, Lord Eldin (1757–1832), Scottish judge, eldest son of John Clerk of Eldin
- Elden (name), given name and surname
- Eldon (given name)
- Eldon (surname)
