= Sin (José novel) =

1973 novel by F. Sionil José

- Book cover for F. Sionil José's novel Sin.
- Author: F. Sionil José
- Language: English
- Genre: Fiction
- Publisher: Solidaridad Publishing House (Philippines) Random House (USA)
- Publication date: 1973
- Publication place: Philippines
- ISBN: 971-8845-24-0

Sin: A Novel, also known as Sins, is a 1973 politico-historical novel written by Filipino National Artist F. Sionil José. This particular work of literature features the History of the Philippines, for the most part spanning the twentieth century, through the eyes of the "amoral" Don Carlos Cobello, a wealthy patriarch also known by the moniker "C.C.".

Being a part of that era, Cobello reaps most of what he sowed when he was already on his "deathbed". During this time, Cobello recalled the loves of his life, those that he had lost and longed for. A literary account of the "steady degradation" of the Philippines, Sin was described by Pico Iyer of The New York Times Book Review as a book" … set in the Philippines, this amorality tale shadows a rake's impenitent progress …"

== Description ==
Filipino author Allen Gaborro described Sin as the “most controversial” and the "most bohemian" or unconventional among José’s novels because it portrayed the indecencies of Don Carlos Cobello in spite of the characterisation and reputation of Philippine Society as a highly conservative and predominantly Roman Catholic. The novel is a narrative that challenges the well-established moral codes in the Philippines through the literary use of storylines equipped with adulterous and incestuous affairs, a genre that creates an artifice of sexual tension within the pages of the book. Sin is a work of literature that serves as a threat to the foundations of traditional Filipino mores and the infallibility of fundamental Christianity, the mainstay of the psyche of the majority and the epistemic and spiritual strength of many Filipinos. From a larger perspective, José’s Sin is a novel that galvanises the call to mass consciousness due to its exposé of vanity and greed entrenched in the elite configuration of supremacy and control in countries worldwide.

José also presented in Sin the contrasting inequity between the wealthy and the poverty-stricken, making the book an assault on the unending control of wealth, resources, and social capital by Filipino aristocrats. It also assails on the theme of racial discrimination committed by the landed, mestizo gentry against the Indios, or the indigenous Malay race of Filipino society, who were victims of the same prejudice beginning with the arrival of the Spanish in 1521. The narration in José’s Sin has been compared to the novels written by Milan Kundera.

== Principal character ==
The main character of the novel is Don Carlos Cobello, a Spanish mestizo or a Filipino with Spanish ancestry who had little direct contact with brown-skinned Filipinos, or Indios. According to José’s narrative and portrayal, Cobello is the embodiment of a “libidinous fornicator”, the egotistic and selfish aristocrat who himself described sinfulness as a social definition instead of being a moral designation, and further described sin as an absurd and grotesque creation of society. Cobello is also a believer in the statement that "historical interpretation is reserved for the ‘strong’". Cobello later becomes a paraplegic because of a freak accident that occurred in his bathroom. The handicap stripped Cobello of his pride and physical capabilities, but it was an impairment that was not able to rule over his soul. The literary interludes that are composed of Cobello’s obsessive recollections are the "sinner’s" form of repentance, to avoid bequeathing a legacy of hubris, decadence, greed, and iniquities. José, however, leaves the readers unsure whether Cobello was sincere or just pandering during the character’s outburst of "penitent language".

Cobello has two children — Angela, the heiress of Cobello’s wealth, and Delfin, Cobello’s antithesis. Although presented to the public as Cobello’s decorous and culturally sophisticated niece, Angela is in truth Cobello’s daughter, the product of a union with his sister, Corito. Although the incestuous relationship is kept secret from Angela herself, she remains a constant reminder to both Cobello and Corito of their acts and guilt. On the other hand, Delfin, born from the womb of Cobello’s teenage lover of an impecunious background, becomes a lawyer and defender of the rights of the poor, who avoids following in Cobello’s footsteps. Delfin rejected his father’s offer of a privileged and luxurious lifestyle, becoming a person who disapproves of the oligarchy, their excesses, and the abuses committed by them. Delfin did not want to belong to the elite world into which his father, Cobello had long stubbornly ensconced himself.
