= Elden C. Bailey =

American percussionist

Elden C. Bailey, (April 22, 1922 – April 13, 2004) was an American percussionist.
