= Emaft =

Emaft امافت
- Village
- Location within Iran
- Coordinates: 35°57′48″N 53°07′52″E
- Country: Iran
- Province: Mazandaran
- County: Savadkuh
- Bakhsh: Central
- Rural District: Rastupey
- Elevation: 1,600 m (5,200 ft)

Population (2016)
  - Total: 156
- Time zone: UTC+3:30 (IRST)

Emaft (Persian: امافت, also Romanized as Emāft) is a village in Rastupey Rural District, in the Central District of Savadkuh County, Mazandaran Province, Iran.

== Geography ==
Emaft is located in central Alborz mountains in the forests of southern Savadkuh. It is connected to Road 79 by a secondary road. Emaft's nearby villages include Kangelo, Melerd and Sartangeh in south, Kerman in northwest and Bernat in northeast.

== Demographics ==
At the 2016 census, Emaft's population was 156, in 54 families, up from 108 people in 2006. People of Emaft are employed in farming, gardening, and animal husbandry activities. Agricultural products include wheat, barley, Walnut, cherry, apple and plum.
