= Ejet =

Ejet اجت
- Village
- Interactive map of Ejet
- Coordinates: 35°54′57″N 52°57′47″E
- Country: Iran
- Province: Mazandaran
- County: Savadkuh
- Bakhsh: Central
- Rural District: Rastupey
- Elevation: 1,800 m (5,900 ft)

Population (2016)
  - Total: 48
- Time zone: UTC+3:30 (IRST)

Ejet (Persian: اجت) is a village in Rastupey Rural District, in the Central District of Savadkuh County, in the Mazandaran Province, Iran.

It is a mountainous village in the central Alborz mountain range, 24 km (15 mi) southwest of Pol-e Sefid, and 70 km (43 mi) southwest of Sari. Ejet is surrounded by the forests and is in a short distance from Firuzkuh Road, making it a touristic village. The closest village to Ejet is Veresk in southeast.

== Demographics ==
Ejet was registered as a village in early 2010s, following the construction of houses in the pastures. People of the village are active in Animal husbandry and speak the Mazanderani language.

At the 2016 census, its population was 48, in 19 families.
