= Arim, Savadkuh =

Arim آریم
- village
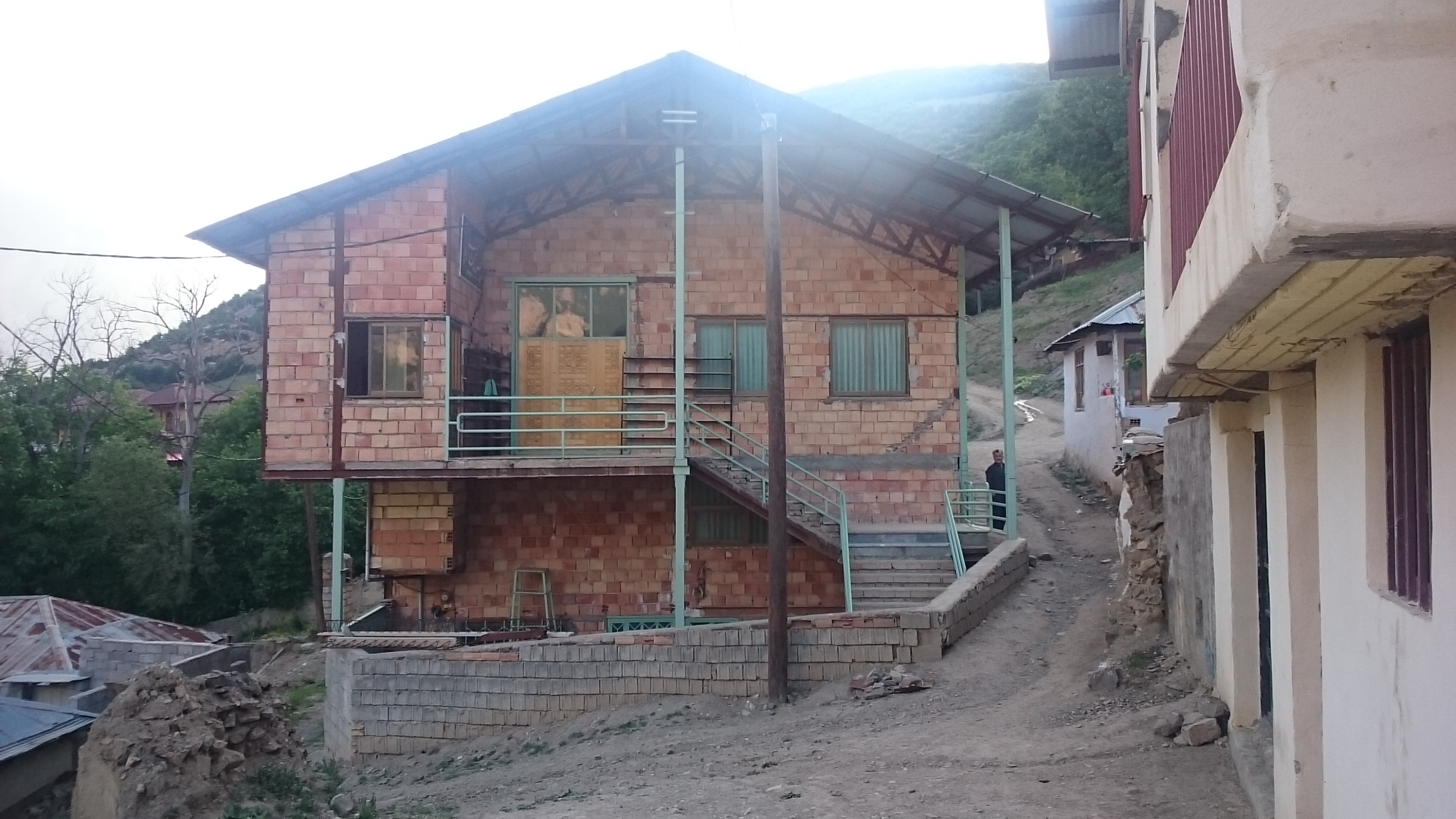
- Tekiyeyearim

- Location within Iran
- Coordinates: 35°56′21″N 53°11′52″E
- Country: Iran
- Province: Mazandaran
- County: Savadkuh
- Bakhsh: Central
- Rural District: Rastupey

Population (2006)
  - Total: 111
- Time zone: UTC+3:30 (IRST)

Arim (Persian: آریم, also Romanized as Ārīm) is a village in Rastupey Rural District, in the Central District of Savadkuh County, Mazandaran Province, Iran. Arim located after Kangelo Village . At the 2016 census, its population was 61, in 26 families, down from 111 people in 2006.
