= Kord Asiab =

Kord Asiab کردآسیاب
- Village
- Interactive map of Kord Asiab
- Coordinates: 35°59′18.65″N 53°08′5″E
- Country: Iran
- Province: Mazandaran
- County: Savadkuh
- Bakhsh: Central
- Rural District: Rastupey

Population (2016)
  - Total: 31
- Time zone: UTC+3:30 (IRST)

Kord Asiab (Persian: کردآسیاب, also romanized as "Kord-āsiyāb" and "Kord Aseyab") is a village in Rastupey Rural District, in the Central District of Savadkuh County, in Mazandaran Province, Iran.

It is a mountainous village with a temperate climate, 23 km (14 mi) southeast of Pol-e Sefid city and 9 km (5.6 mi) east of Dowgol Station.

== Demographics ==
In Iran's Geographical dictionary published in 1950, Kord Asiab was part of the Savadkuh District in Shahi County. Its population was 450 people, who were shia muslim and spoke Mazanderani and Persian languages. The water source of the village was the natural springs, with rice, Dairy product and cereal being the village's products. Scarf weaving has also been common among the women.

At the 1966 census, Kord Asiab's population was 63 people in 10 households. The village had a mosque and its products were wheat and barley. The 1976 census recorded a population of 44 people in 7 households.

At the 2016 census, its population was 31, in 11 households.
