= Baye Kola, Savadkuh =

Village in Mazandaran province, Iran

Baye Kola Persian: بايع كلا
- Village
- Location within Iran
- Coordinates: 36°01′40″N 53°06′45″E
- Country: Iran
- Province: Mazandaran
- County: Savadkuh
- District: Central
- Rural District: Rastupey

Population (2016)
  - Total: 287
- Time zone: UTC+3:30 (IRST)

Baye Kola (Persian: بايع كلا) (Note: Also romanized as Bāye‘ Kolā; also known as Bā’ī Kolā, Bāy Kalā, and Bāy Kolā) is a village in Rastupey Rural District of the Central District in Savadkuh County, Mazandaran province, Iran.

== Demographics ==
=== Population ===
At the time of the 2006 National Census, the village's population was 55 in 18 households. The following census in 2011 counted 315 people in 91 households. The 2016 census measured the population of the village as 287 people in 92 households.
