= Pain Do Ab =

Pain Do Ab پايين دواب
- Village
- Location within Iran
- Coordinates: 36°00′29″N 53°02′52″E
- Country: Iran
- Province: Mazandaran
- County: Savadkuh
- Bakhsh: Central
- Rural District: Rastupey

Population (2006)
  - Total: 122
- Time zone: UTC+3:30 (IRST)

Pain Do Ab (Persian: پايين دواب, also Romanized as Pā’īn Do Āb) is a village in Rastupey Rural District, in the Central District of Savadkuh County, Mazandaran Province, Iran. At the 2016 census, its population was 77, in 33 families, down from 122 people in 2006.
