= Sang Sarag =

Sang Sarag سنگ سرگ
- Village
- Location within Iran
- Coordinates: 35°58′50″N 52°58′32″E
- Country: Iran
- Province: Mazandaran
- County: Savadkuh
- Bakhsh: Central
- Rural District: Rastupey

Population (2016)
  - Total: 92
- Time zone: UTC+3:30 (IRST)

Sang Sarag (Persian: سنگ سرگ; also known as Sang Sarak and Sang S‘erek) is a village in Rastupey Rural District, in the Central District of Savadkuh County, Mazandaran Province, Iran. At the 2016 census, its population was 92, in 35 families, up from 79 people in 2006.
