= Aseh =

Aseh اسه
- Village
- Location within Iran
- Coordinates: 36°03′07″N 53°08′12″E
- Country: Iran
- Province: Mazandaran
- County: Savadkuh
- Bakhsh: Central
- Rural District: Rastupey

Population (2006)
  - Total: 79
- Time zone: UTC+3:30 (IRST)

Aseh (Persian: اسه, also Romanized as Āseh) is a village in Rastupey Rural District, in the Central District of Savadkuh County, Mazandaran Province, Iran. At the 2016 census, its population was 39, in 14 families, down from 79 people in 2006.
