= Shurek Chal =

Shurek Chal شوركچال
- Village
- Location within Iran
- Coordinates: 35°55′55″N 53°01′17″E
- Country: Iran
- Province: Mazandaran
- County: Savadkuh
- Bakhsh: Central
- Rural District: Rastupey

Population (2016)
  - Total: 107
- Time zone: UTC+3:30 (IRST)

Shurek Chal (Persian: شوركچال, also Romanized as Shūrek Chāl) is a village in Rastupey Rural District, in the Central District of Savadkuh County, Mazandaran Province, Iran. At the 2016 census, its population was 107, in 33 families, up from 80 people in 2006.
