= Tale, Iran =

Village in Mazandaran province, Iran

Tale Persian: طالع
- Village
- Location within Iran
- Coordinates: 36°03′46″N 53°02′24″E
- Country: Iran
- Province: Mazandaran
- County: Savadkuh
- District: Central
- Rural District: Rastupey

Population (2016)
  - Total: 241
- Time zone: UTC+3:30 (IRST)

Tale (Persian: طالع) (Note: Also romanized as Ţāle‘) is a village in Rastupey Rural District of the Central District in Savadkuh County, Mazandaran province, Iran.

== Demographics ==
=== Population ===
At the time of the 2006 National Census, the village's population was 111 in 31 households. The following census in 2011 counted 144 people in 58 households. The 2016 census measured the population of the village as 241 people in 83 households.
