= Pelpa =

Pelpa پل پا
- Village
- Location within Iran
- Coordinates: 35°58′10″N 53°02′22″E
- Country: Iran
- Province: Mazandaran
- County: Savadkuh
- Bakhsh: Central
- Rural District: Rastupey

Population (2006)
  - Total: 28
- Time zone: UTC+3:30 (IRST)

Pelpa (Persian: پل پا, also Romanized as Pelpā; also known as Pelīā) is a village in Rastupey Rural District, in the Central District of Savadkuh County, Mazandaran Province, Iran. At the 2006 census, its population was 28, in 8 families.
