= Posht-e Gol, Mazandaran =

Posht-e Gol پشتگل
- Village
- Location within Iran
- Coordinates: 35°57′40″N 52°58′48″E
- Country: Iran
- Province: Mazandaran
- County: Savadkuh
- Bakhsh: Central
- Rural District: Rastupey

Population (2016)
  - Total: 41
- Time zone: UTC+3:30 (IRST)

Posht-e Gol (Persian: پشتگل; also known as Pesteh Kal and Posht Kal) is a village in Rastupey Rural District, in the Central District of Savadkuh County, Mazandaran Province, Iran. At the 2016 census, its population was 41, in 12 families, up from 29 people in 2006.
