= Darka Rudbar =

Darka Rudbar دركارودبار
- Village
- Country: Iran
- Province: Mazandaran
- County: Savadkuh
- Bakhsh: Central
- Rural District: Rastupey

Population (2006)
  - Total: 176
- Time zone: UTC+3:30 (IRST)

Darka Rudbar (Persian: دركارودبار, also Romanized as Darkā Rūdbār) is a village in Rastupey Rural District, in the Central District of Savadkuh County, Mazandaran Province, Iran. At the 2006 census, its population was 53, in 16 families, down from 176 people in 2006.
