= Varpey =

Varpey ورپي
- Village
- Location within Iran
- Coordinates: 36°01′11″N 53°09′38″E
- Country: Iran
- Province: Mazandaran
- County: Savadkuh
- Bakhsh: Central
- Rural District: Rastupey

Population (2016)
  - Total: 71
- Time zone: UTC+3:30 (IRST)

Varpey (Persian: ورپي; also known as Varī Pey) is a village in Rastupey Rural District, in the Central District of Savadkuh County, Mazandaran Province, Iran. At the 2016 census, its population was 71, in 24 families, up from 14 people in 2006.
