= Laluk, Savadkuh =

Laluk للوك
- Village
- Location within Iran
- Coordinates: 36°05′29″N 53°04′14″E
- Country: Iran
- Province: Mazandaran
- County: Savadkuh
- Bakhsh: Central
- Rural District: Rastupey

Population (2006)
  - Total: 76
- Time zone: UTC+3:30 (IRST)

Laluk (Persian: للوك, also Romanized as Lalūk) is a village in Rastupey Rural District, in the Central District of Savadkuh County, Mazandaran Province, Iran. At the 2006 census, its population was 76, in 22 families.
