= Bagh-e Sorkhabad =

Bagh-e Sorkhabad باغ سرخ آباد
- Village
- Interactive map of Bagh-e Sorkhabad
- Country: Iran
- Province: Mazandaran
- County: Savadkuh
- Bakhsh: Central
- Rural District: Rastupey

Population (2016)
  - Total: 19
- Time zone: UTC+3:30 (IRST)

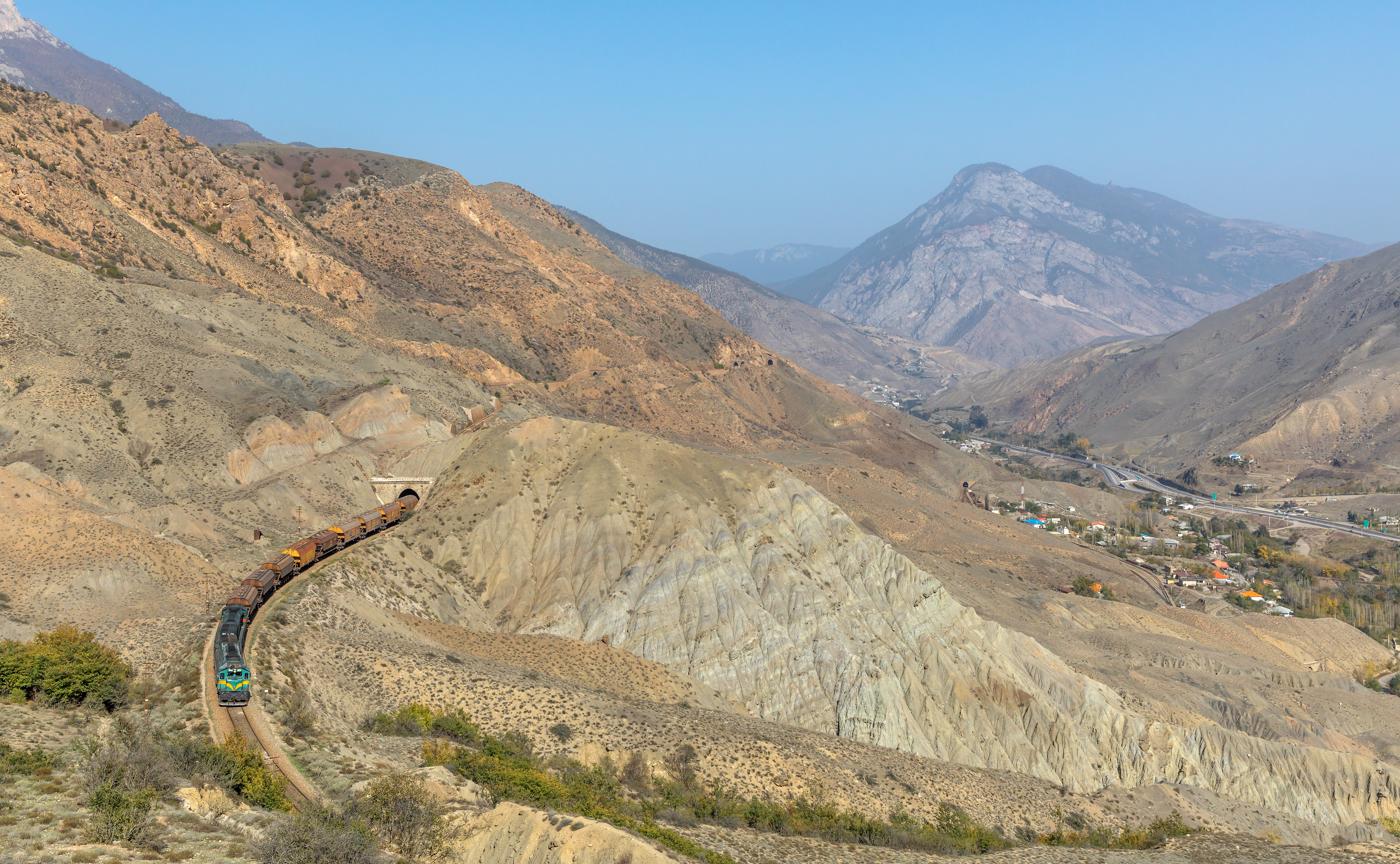
Railway in Sorkhabad

Bagh-e Sorkhabad (Persian: باغ سرخ آباد) is a village in Rastupey Rural District, in the Central District of Savadkuh County, in the Mazandaran Province, Iran. At the 2016 census, its population was 19, in 9 families.
