= Sar Chaleshk =

Sar Chaleshk سرچلشك
- Village
- Location within Iran
- Coordinates: 36°00′23″N 53°04′51″E
- Country: Iran
- Province: Mazandaran
- County: Savadkuh
- Bakhsh: Central
- Rural District: Rastupey

Population (2006)
  - Total: 22
- Time zone: UTC+3:30 (IRST)

Sar Chaleshk (Persian: سرچلشك) is a village in Rastupey Rural District, in the Central District of Savadkuh County, Mazandaran Province, Iran. At the time of the 2006 census, its population was 22, spread among 6 families. In 2016 there were less than 4 households in the village.
