= Bala Do Ab =

Bala Do Ab بالادواب
- Village
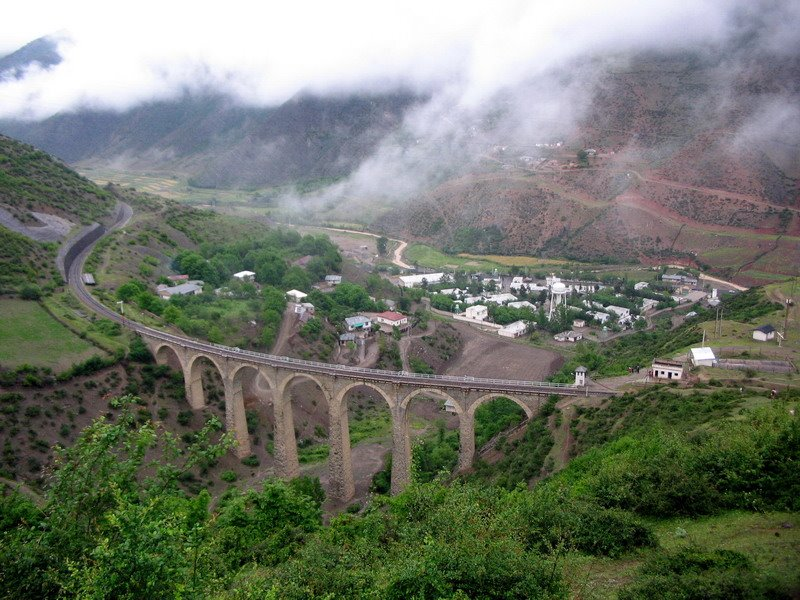

- Location within Iran
- Coordinates: 36°01′10″N 53°02′43″E
- Country: Iran
- Province: Mazandaran
- County: Savadkuh
- Bakhsh: Central
- Rural District: Rastupey

Population (2006)
  - Total: 104
- Time zone: UTC+3:30 (IRST)

Bala Do Ab (Persian: بالادواب, also Romanized as Bālā Do Āb; also known as Do Āb, Dow Āb, Duab, Lā Do Āb, and Rovāt Sar) is a village in Rastupey Rural District, in the Central District of Savadkuh County, Mazandaran Province, Iran. At the 2016 census, its population was 78, in 28 families, down from 104 people in 2006.
