= Dehkhoda, Mazandaran =

Dehkhoda دهخدا
- Village
- Location within Iran
- Coordinates: 36°01′24″N 53°02′42″E
- Country: Iran
- Province: Mazandaran
- County: Savadkuh
- Bakhsh: Central
- Rural District: Rastupey

Population (2006)
  - Total: 96
- Time zone: UTC+3:30 (IRST)

Dehkhoda (Persian: دهخدا, also Romanized as Dehkhodā) is a village in Rastupey Rural District, in the Central District of Savadkuh County, Mazandaran Province, Iran. At the 2016 census, its population was 48, in 15 families, down from 96 people in 2006.
