= Esas =

Village in Mazandaran province, Iran

Esas Persian: اساس
- Village
- Location within Iran
- Coordinates: 36°08′33″N 53°03′54″E
- Country: Iran
- Province: Mazandaran
- County: Savadkuh
- District: Central
- Rural District: Rastupey

Population (2016)
  - Total: 332
- Time zone: UTC+3:30 (IRST)

Esas (Persian: اساس) (Note: Also romanized as Esās) is a village in Rastupey Rural District of the Central District in Savadkuh County, Mazandaran province, Iran.

== Demographics ==
=== Population ===
At the time of the 2006 National Census, the village's population was 274 in 71 households. The following census in 2011 counted 217 people in 68 households. The 2016 census measured the population of the village as 332 people in 128 households.
