= Mali Darreh =

Mali Darreh مالي دره
- Village
- Location within Iran
- Coordinates: 35°57′58″N 52°57′09″E
- Country: Iran
- Province: Mazandaran
- County: Savadkuh
- Bakhsh: Central
- Rural District: Rastupey

Population (2006)
  - Total: 9
- Time zone: UTC+3:30 (IRST)

Mali Darreh (Persian: مالي دره, also Romanized as Mālī Darreh) is a village in Rastupey Rural District, in the Central District of Savadkuh County, Mazandaran Province, Iran. At the 2006 census, its population was 9, in 4 families. In 2016, there were less than 4 households residing in the village.
