= Ziarat Sar =

Ziarat Sar زيارت سر
- Village
- Location within Iran
- Coordinates: 35°58′20″N 52°59′25″E
- Country: Iran
- Province: Mazandaran
- County: Savadkuh
- Bakhsh: Central
- Rural District: Rastupey

Population (2016)
  - Total: 48
- Time zone: UTC+3:30 (IRST)

Ziarat Sar (Persian: زيارت سر, also Romanized as Zīārat Sar) is a village in Rastupey Rural District, in the Central District of Savadkuh County, Mazandaran Province, Iran. At the 2016 census, its population was 48, in 22 families, up from 22 people in 2006.
