= Owrim Rudbar =

Owrim Rudbar اوريم رودبار
- Village
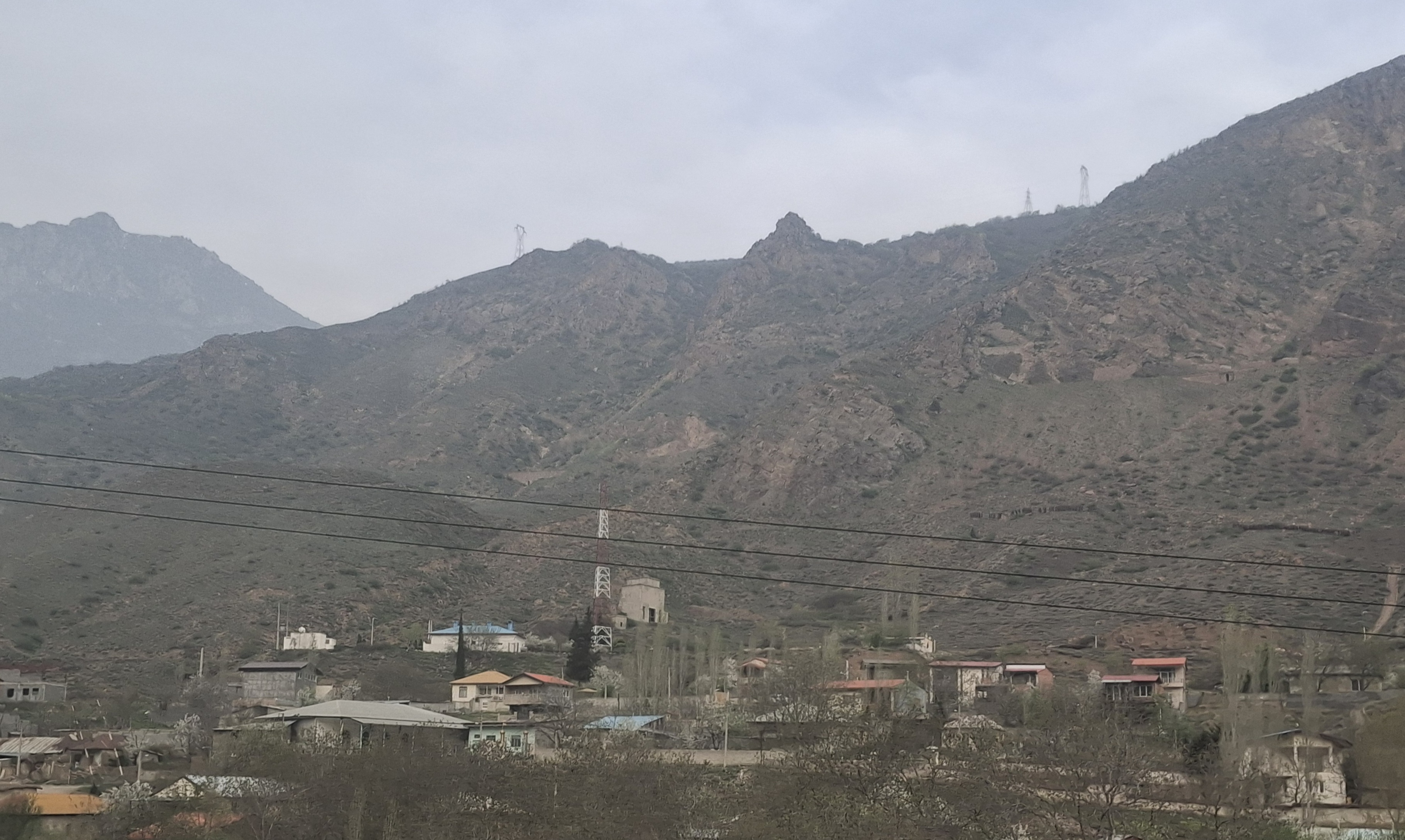
- Sorkhabad in Owrim Rudbar

- Location within Iran
- Coordinates: 35°56′50″N 53°00′11″E
- Country: Iran
- Province: Mazandaran
- County: Savadkuh
- Bakhsh: Central
- Rural District: Rastupey

Population (2006)
  - Total: 189
- Time zone: UTC+3:30 (IRST)

Owrim Rudbar (Persian: اوريم رودبار, also Romanized as Owrīm Rūdbār and Ūrīm Rūdbār) is a village in Rastupey Rural District, in the Central District of Savadkuh County, Mazandaran Province, Iran. At the 2016 census, its population was 157, in 59 families. Down from 189 people in 2006.
