= Zal Darreh =

Zal Darreh ذال دره
- Village
- Location within Iran
- Coordinates: 35°59′06″N 53°01′53″E
- Country: Iran
- Province: Mazandaran
- County: Savadkuh
- Bakhsh: Central
- Rural District: Rastupey

Population (2006)
  - Total: 28
- Time zone: UTC+3:30 (IRST)

Zal Darreh (Persian: ذال دره, also Romanized as Z̄āl Darreh and Zāl Darreh) is a village in Rastupey Rural District, in the Central District of Savadkuh County, Mazandaran Province, Iran. At the 2016 census, its population was 11, in 4 families, down from 28 people in 2006.
