= Estakhr Sar, Savadkuh =

Estakhr Sar استخرسر
- Village
- Location within Iran
- Coordinates: 36°08′16″N 53°02′07″E
- Country: Iran
- Province: Mazandaran
- County: Savadkuh
- Bakhsh: Central
- Rural District: Rastupey

Population (2016)
  - Total: 174
- Time zone: UTC+3:30 (IRST)

Estakhr Sar (Persian: استخرسر) is a village in Rastupey Rural District, in the Central District of Savadkuh County, Mazandaran Province, Iran. At the 2006 census, its population was 174, in 49 families, up from 109 people in 2006.
