= Simet =

Village in Mazandaran province, Iran

Simet Persian: سيمت
- Village
- Location within Iran
- Coordinates: 36°00′58″N 53°02′25″E
- Country: Iran
- Province: Mazandaran
- County: Savadkuh
- District: Central
- Rural District: Rastupey

Population (2016)
  - Total: 240
- Time zone: UTC+3:30 (IRST)

Simet (Persian: سيمت) (Note: Also romanized as Sīmat and Sīmet) is a village in Rastupey Rural District of the Central District in Savadkuh County, Mazandaran province, Iran.

== Demographics ==
=== Population ===
At the time of the 2006 National Census, the village's population was 189 in 60 households. The following census in 2011 counted 124 people in 41 households. The 2016 census measured the population of the village as 240 people in 85 households.
