= Deh Mian, Mazandaran =

Village in Mazandaran province, Iran

Deh Mian Persian: ده ميان
- Village
- Location within Iran
- Coordinates: 36°02′45″N 53°09′01″E
- Country: Iran
- Province: Mazandaran
- County: Savadkuh
- District: Central
- Rural District: Rastupey

Population (2016)
  - Total: 241
- Time zone: UTC+3:30 (IRST)

Deh Mian (Persian: ده ميان) (Note: Also romanized as Deh Meyān and Deh Mīān; also known as Deh-e Manān) is a village in Rastupey Rural District of the Central District in Savadkuh County, Mazandaran province, Iran.

== Demographics ==
=== Population ===
At the time of the 2006 National Census, the village's population was 156 in 39 households. The following census in 2011 counted 181 people in 57 households. The 2016 census measured the population of the village as 241 people in 90 households.
