= Vesiyeh Sar =

Village in Mazandaran province, Iran

Vesiyeh Sar Persian: وسيه سر
- Village
- Location within Iran
- Coordinates: 35°58′18″N 52°59′22″E
- Country: Iran
- Province: Mazandaran
- County: Savadkuh
- District: Central
- Rural District: Rastupey

Population (2016)
  - Total: 253
- Time zone: UTC+3:30 (IRST)

Vesiyeh Sar (Persian: وسيه سر) (Note: Also romanized as Vesīyeh Sar and Vesyeh Sar; also known as Vesī Sar) is a village in Rastupey Rural District of the Central District in Savadkuh County, Mazandaran province, Iran.

== Demographics ==
=== Population ===
At the time of the 2006 National Census, the village's population was 210 in 65 households. The following census in 2011 counted 281 people in 112 households. The 2016 census measured the population of the village as 253 people in 94 households.
