= Aleban =

Aleban البن
- Village
- Location within Iran
- Coordinates: 36°02′41″N 53°02′49″E
- Country: Iran
- Province: Mazandaran
- County: Savadkuh
- Bakhsh: Central
- Rural District: Rastupey

Population (2006)
  - Total: 18
- Time zone: UTC+3:30 (IRST)

Aleban (Persian: البن) is a village in Rastupey Rural District, in the Central District of Savadkuh County, Mazandaran Province, Iran. At the 2016 census, its population was 7, in 4 families, down from 18 people in 2006.
