= Dowgol Station =

Dowgal دوگل
- Village/railway station
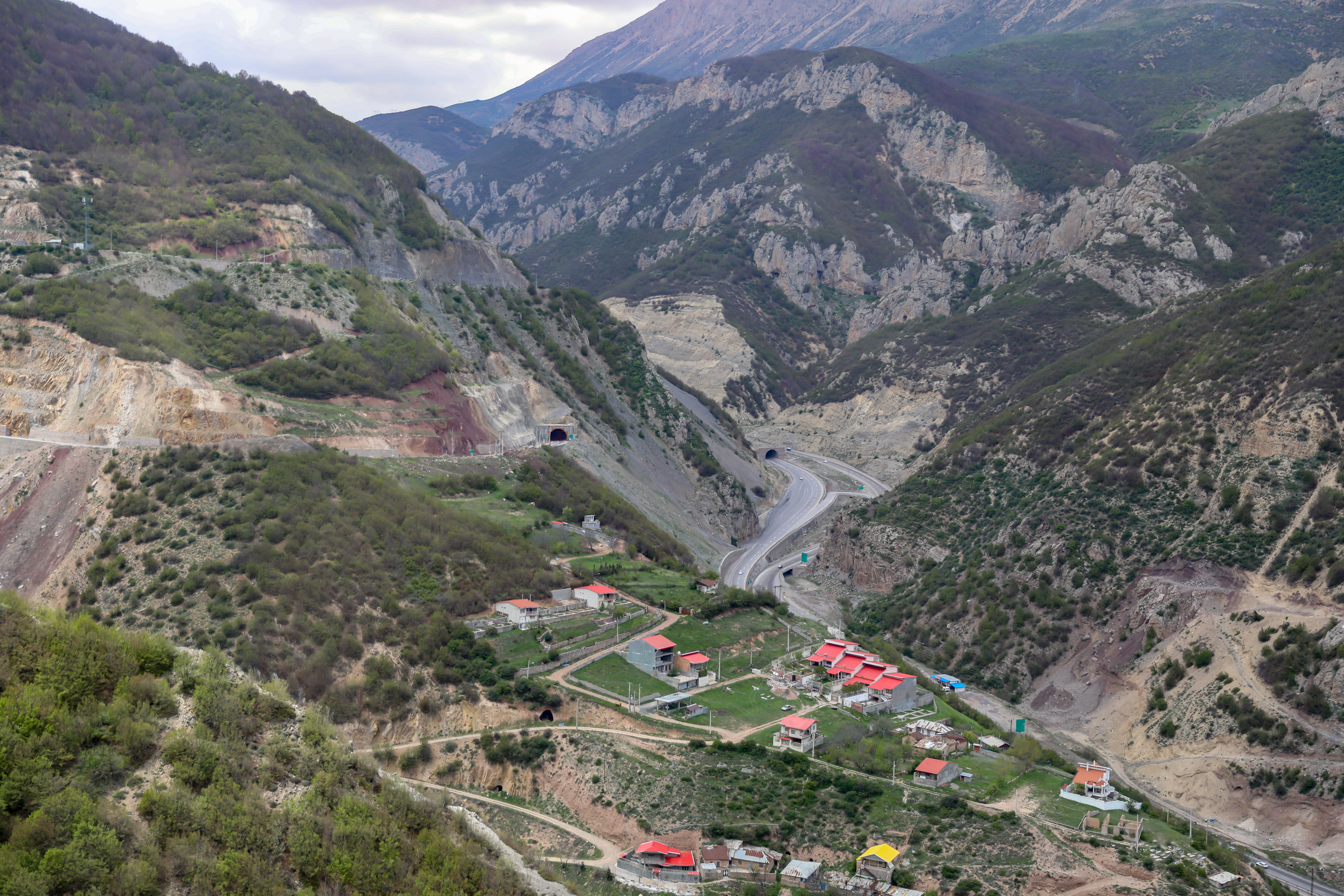
- Dowgal village and Road 79, view from the Tehran-Shomal railway
- Interactive map of Dowgal
- Coordinates: 35°52′40.782″N 52°57′54.094″E
- Country: Iran
- Province: Mazandaran
- County: Savadkuh
- Bakhsh: Central
- Rural District: Rastupey
- Elevation: 1,800 m (5,900 ft)

Population (2016)
  - Total: 17
- Time zone: UTC+3:30 (IRST)

Dowgal (Persian: دوگل, romanized: Dowgal, also known as Dowgal Station (Persian: ایستکاه دوگل, romanized: Istgah-e Dowgal)) is a village and railway station in Rastupey Rural District, in the Central District of Savadkuh County, Mazandaran Province, Iran. The station and the nearby railway bridges are part of the Trans-Iranian Railway constructed during the Reza Shah era and were registered as a national monument in 2005.

== Demographics ==
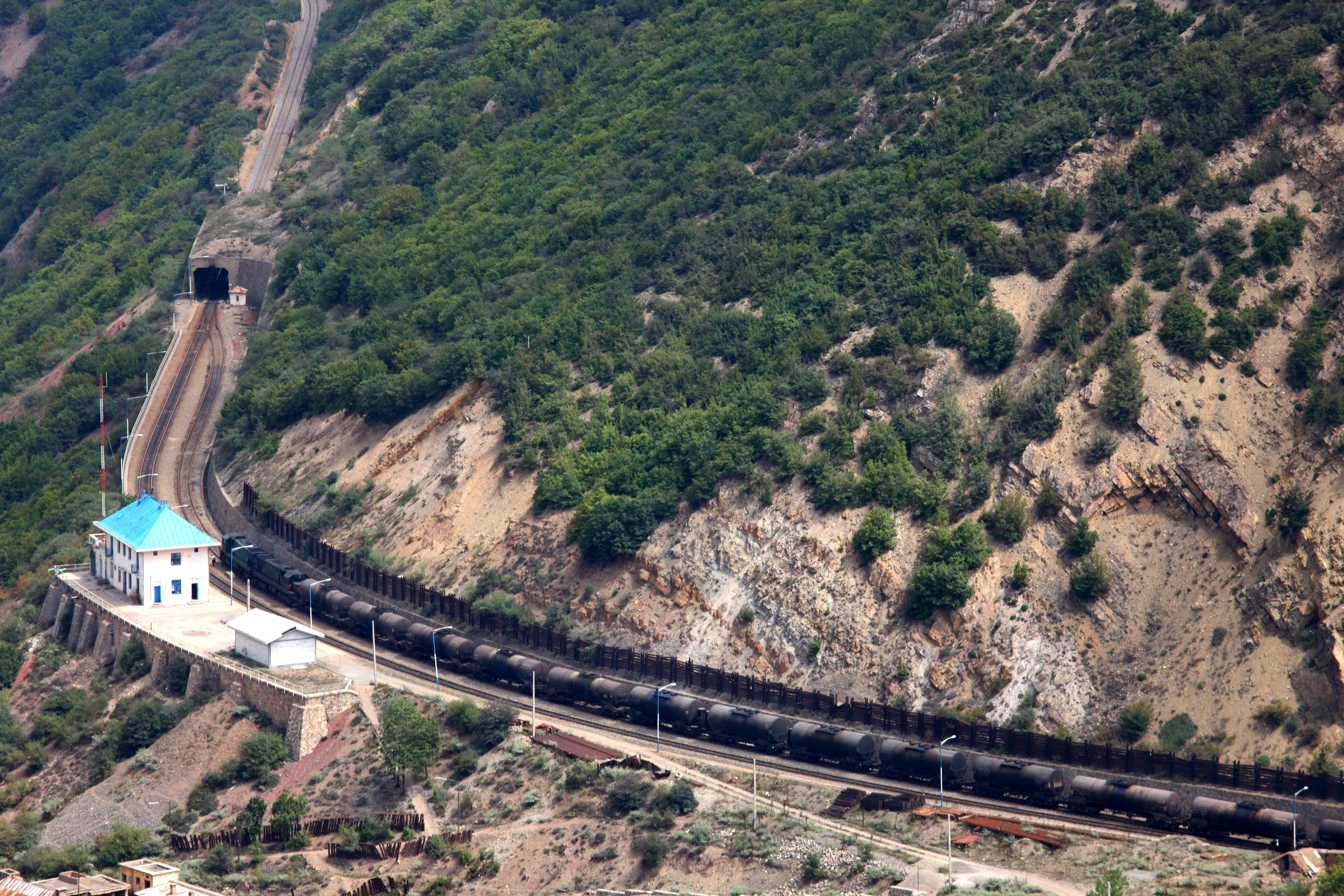
Dowgal Train Station

During Iran's first public census in 1956, Dowgal had a population of 157 people.

At the time of the 1986 census, Dowgal's population was 124 people in 28 households, of which 60 were educated and 24 were employed. The village had access to power, but not tap water, and elementary school was also present.

At the 2006 census, its population was 16, in 7 families. In 2016, Dowgal's population was 17, in 6 households.

The main activity of the villagers is Animal husbandry. The spoken language by the people is Mazanderani.
