= Shur Mast-e Rudbar =

Village in Mazandaran province, Iran

Shur Mast-e Rudbar Persian: شورمست رودبار
- Village
- Location within Iran
- Coordinates: 36°05′17″N 53°04′05″E
- Country: Iran
- Province: Mazandaran
- County: Savadkuh
- District: Central
- Rural District: Rastupey

Population (2016)
  - Total: 200
- Time zone: UTC+3:30 (IRST)

Shur Mast-e Rudbar (Persian: شورمست رودبار) (Note: also romanized as Shūr Mast-e Rūdbār) is a village in, and the capital of, Rastupey Rural District in the Central District of Savadkuh County, Mazandaran province, Iran.

== Demographics ==
=== Population ===
At the time of the 2006 National Census, the village's population was 138 in 43 households. The following census in 2011 counted 160 people in 58 households. The 2016 census measured the population of the village as 200 people in 77 households.
