= Kamar Posht =

Kamar Posht كمرپشت
- Village
- Location within Iran
- Coordinates: 35°58′30″N 53°03′43″E
- Country: Iran
- Province: Mazandaran
- County: Savadkuh
- Bakhsh: Central
- Rural District: Rastupey

Population (2006)
  - Total: 144
- Time zone: UTC+3:30 (IRST)

Kamar Posht (Persian: كمرپشت) is a village in Rastupey Rural District, in the Central District of Savadkuh County, Mazandaran province, Iran. At the 2016 census, its population was 87, in 36 families, down from 144 people in 2006.

During winter times in Iran, temperatures drop below the freezing point with snow often being so severe that access to the mountain and village becomes cut off. Due to the severe weather conditions and inaccessibility to food and resources no resident lives in kamarposht permanently but rather families who have had a presence there for a long time go up their for weeks or months at a times.
