= Folurd =

Village in Mazandaran province, Iran

Folurd Persian: فلورد
- Village
- Location within Iran
- Coordinates: 36°03′47″N 53°07′33″E
- Country: Iran
- Province: Mazandaran
- County: Savadkuh
- District: Central
- Rural District: Rastupey

Population (2016)
  - Total: 479
- Time zone: UTC+3:30 (IRST)

Folurd (Persian: فلورد) (Note: Also romanized as Folūrd and Felūrd) is a village in Rastupey Rural District of the Central District in Savadkuh County, Mazandaran province, Iran.

== Demographics ==
=== Population ===
At the time of the 2006 National Census, the village's population was 402 in 93 households. The following census in 2011 counted 253 people in 77 households. The 2016 census measured the population of the village as 479 people in 178 households.
