= Kuh-e Estel =

Coordinates: 36°01′34″N 53°09′08″E

Kuh-e Estel كوه استل
- Village
- Interactive map of Kuh-e Estel
- Country: Iran
- Province: Mazandaran
- County: Savadkuh
- Bakhsh: Central
- Rural District: Rastupey

Population (2006)
  - Total: 133
- Time zone: UTC+3:30 (IRST)

Kuh-e Estel (Persian: كوه استل, also Romanized as Kūh-e Estel) is a village in Rastupey Rural District, in the Central District of Savadkuh County, Mazandaran Province, Iran. At the 2016 census, its population was 80, in 33 families. Down from 133 people in 2006.
