= Sefiddar Goleh =

Sefiddar Goleh سفيددارگله
- Village
- Location within Iran
- Coordinates: 35°59′29″N 53°02′21″E
- Country: Iran
- Province: Mazandaran
- County: Savadkuh
- Bakhsh: Central
- Rural District: Rastupey

Population (2006)
  - Total: 96
- Time zone: UTC+3:30 (IRST)

Sefiddar Goleh (Persian: سفيددارگله, also Romanized as Sefīddār Goleh and Sefīdār Goleh) is a village in Rastupey Rural District, in the Central District of Savadkuh County, Mazandaran Province, Iran. At the 2016 census, its population was 66, in 27 families. down from 96 people in 2006.
