= Anarom =

Anarom انارم
- Village
- Location within Iran
- Coordinates: 36°01′48″N 53°09′58″E
- Country: Iran
- Province: Mazandaran
- County: Savadkuh
- Bakhsh: Central
- Rural District: Rastupey

Population (2016)
  - Total: 169
- Time zone: UTC+3:30 (IRST)

Anarom (Persian: انارم, also Romanized as Anārom; also known as Anārūm) is a village in Rastupey Rural District, in the Central District of Savadkuh County, Mazandaran Province, Iran. At the 2016 census, its population was 169, in 59 families, up from 158 people in 2006.
