= Lamzer =

Lamzer لمزر
- Village
- Location within Iran
- Coordinates: 36°04′45″N 53°06′02″E
- Country: Iran
- Province: Mazandaran
- County: Savadkuh
- Bakhsh: Central
- Rural District: Rastupey

Population (2006)
  - Total: 84
- Time zone: UTC+3:30 (IRST)

Lamzer (Persian: لمزر; also known as Lamarz) is a village in Rastupey Rural District, in the Central District of Savadkuh County, Mazandaran Province, Iran. At the 2016 census, its population was 73, in 28 families, down from 84 people in 2006.
