= Asadabad, Savadkuh =

Asadabad اسداباد
- Village
- Location within Iran
- Coordinates: 36°02′53″N 53°03′30″E
- Country: Iran
- Province: Mazandaran
- County: Savadkuh
- Bakhsh: Central
- Rural District: Rastupey

Population (2016)
  - Total: 37
- Time zone: UTC+3:30 (IRST)

Asadabad (Persian: اسداباد, also Romanized as Asadābād; also known as Asadīābād) is a village in Rastupey Rural District, in the Central District of Savadkuh County, Mazandaran Province, Iran. At the 2016 census, its population was 37, in 13 families, up from 33 people in 2006.
