= Pit Sara =

Pit Sara پيت سرا
- Village
- Location within Iran
- Coordinates: 36°01′35″N 53°03′17″E
- Country: Iran
- Province: Mazandaran
- County: Savadkuh
- Bakhsh: Central
- Rural District: Rastupey

Population (2016)
  - Total: 123
- Time zone: UTC+3:30 (IRST)

Pit Sara (Persian: پيت سرا, also Romanized as Pīt Sarā; also known as Pītsareh and Pīt Sūreh) is a village in Rastupey Rural District, in the Central District of Savadkuh County, Mazandaran Province, Iran. At the 2016 census, its population was 123, in 49 families, up from 101 people in 2006.
