= Rajeh =

Village in Mazandaran province, Iran

Rajeh Persian: رجه
- Village
- Location within Iran
- Coordinates: 36°02′33″N 53°07′45″E
- Country: Iran
- Province: Mazandaran
- County: Savadkuh
- District: Central
- Rural District: Rastupey

Population (2016)
  - Total: 236
- Time zone: UTC+3:30 (IRST)

Rajeh (Persian: رجه) is a village in Rastupey Rural District of the Central District in Savadkuh County, Mazandaran province, Iran.

== Demographics ==
=== Population ===
At the time of the 2006 National Census, the village's population was 272 in 80 households. The following census in 2011 counted 169 people in 56 households. The 2016 census measured the population of the village as 236 people in 86 households.
