= Tale-e Rudbar =

Tale-e Rudbar طالع رودبار
- Village
- Location within Iran
- Coordinates: 36°03′18″N 53°03′08″E
- Country: Iran
- Province: Mazandaran
- County: Savadkuh
- Bakhsh: Central
- Rural District: Rastupey

Population (2006)
  - Total: 86
- Time zone: UTC+3:30 (IRST)

Tale-e Rudbar (Persian: طالع رودبار, also Romanized as Ţāle‘-e Rūdbār and Ţāle‘ Rūdbār) is a village in Rastupey Rural District, in the Central District of Savadkuh County, Mazandaran Province, Iran. At the 2016 census, its population was 72, in 25 families, down from 86 people in 2006.
