= Garzin Kheyl =

Garzin Kheyl گرزين خيل
- Village
- Location within Iran
- Coordinates: 35°57′54″N 52°57′34″E
- Country: Iran
- Province: Mazandaran
- County: Savadkuh
- Bakhsh: Central
- Rural District: Rastupey

Population (2016)
  - Total: 70
- Time zone: UTC+3:30 (IRST)

Garzin Kheyl (Persian: گرزين خيل, also Romanized as Garzīn Kheyl; also known as Garzīneh Kheyl) is a village in Rastupey Rural District, in the Central District of Savadkuh County, Mazandaran Province, Iran. At the 2016 census, its population was 70, in 21 families. Up from 23 people in 2006.
