= Arzhang Rudbar =

Arzhang Rudbar ارژنگ رودبار
- Village
- Location within Iran
- Coordinates: 35°59′14″N 53°03′01″E
- Country: Iran
- Province: Mazandaran
- County: Savadkuh
- Bakhsh: Central
- Rural District: Rastupey

Population (2006)
  - Total: 107
- Time zone: UTC+3:30 (IRST)

Arzhang Rudbar (Persian: ارژنگ رودبار, also Romanized as Arzhang Rūdbār) is a village in Rastupey Rural District, in the Central District of Savadkuh County, Mazandaran Province, Iran. At the 2016 census, its population was 80, in 28 families, down from 107 people in 2006.
