= Kerman, Mazandaran =

Kerman کرمان
- Village
- Interactive map of Kerman
- Coordinates: 35°58′38″N 53°05′57″E
- Country: Iran
- Province: Mazandaran
- County: Savadkuh
- Bakhsh: Central
- Rural District: Rastupey

Population (2016)
  - Total: 27
- Time zone: UTC+3:30 (IRST)

Kerman (Persian: کرمان) is a village in Rastupey Rural District, in the Central District of Savadkuh County, in the Mazandaran Province, Iran.

It is a mountainous village with a cold climate and traditional texture. There are 2 mausoleums in the village.

== Demographics ==
In Iran's Geographical dictionary published in 1950, Kerman was part of the Savadkuh District in Sari County. Its population was 190 people, who were shia muslim and spoke Mazanderani and Persian languages. The water source of the village was from the Komrud river and natural springs, with rice, cereal and Dairy product being the village's products.

At the 2016 census, its population was 27, in 13 households. Lower than 48 people recorded in 2011 census.
