= Owrim =

Oorim اوريم
- Village
- Location within Iran
- Coordinates: 35°56′50″N 52°58′34″E
- Country: Iran
- Province: Mazandaran
- County: Savadkuh
- Bakhsh: Central
- Rural District: Rastupey

Population (2006)
  - Total: 118
- Time zone: UTC+3:30 (IRST)

Oorim (Persian: اوريم, also Romanized as Owrīm and Ūrīm) is a village in Rastupey Rural District, in the Central District of Savadkuh County, Mazandaran Province, Iran. At the 2016 census, its population was 97, in 31 families, down from 118 people in 2006.
