= Melerd =

Village in Mazandaran province, Iran

Melerd Persian: ملرد
- Village
- Location within Iran
- Coordinates: 35°57′16″N 53°05′51″E
- Country: Iran
- Province: Mazandaran
- County: Savadkuh
- District: Central
- Rural District: Rastupey

Population (2016)
  - Total: 214
- Time zone: UTC+3:30 (IRST)

Melerd (Persian: ملرد) (Note: Also known as Melārd) is a village in Rastupey Rural District of the Central District in Savadkuh County, Mazandaran province, Iran.

== Demographics ==
=== Population ===
At the time of the 2006 National Census, the village's population was 75 in 21 households. The following census in 2011 counted 360 people in 105 households. The 2016 census measured the population of the village as 214 people in 82 households.
