= Urim (disambiguation) =

"Urim and Thummim" (Hebrew: האורים והתומים) is a phrase found in the Hebrew Bible.

Urim may also refer to:

- Ur, an ancient Sumerian city-state
- Urim, Iran
- Urim, Israel
- Urim and Thummim (Latter Day Saints)
- Urim language, spoken in Papua New Guinea
- Urim Publications, an Israeli Jewish publisher
- Urim SIGINT Base, an Israeli intelligence-gathering installation
- Rabbi Jonathan Eybeschutz, author of the Urim ve-Tummim, a legal commentary on the Jewish Code of Law (Shulchan Aruch)
