= Shur Mast =

Village in Mazandaran province, Iran

Shur Mast Persian: شورمست
- Village
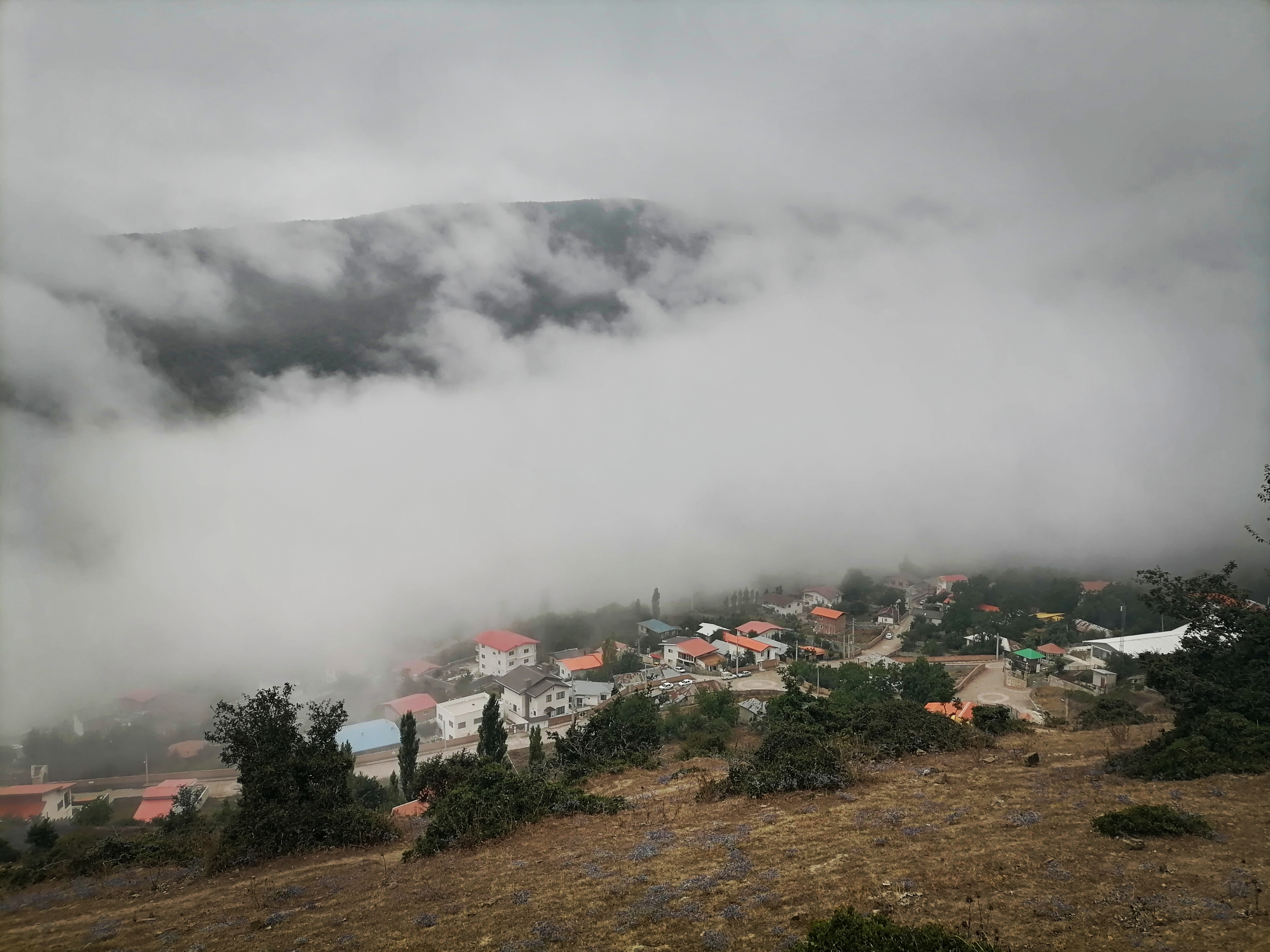
- The village of Shur Mast

- Location within Iran
- Coordinates: 36°05′28″N 53°02′20″E
- Country: Iran
- Province: Mazandaran
- County: Savadkuh
- District: Central
- Rural District: Rastupey

Population (2016)
  - Total: 270
- Time zone: UTC+3:30 (IRST)

Shur Mast (Persian: شورمست) (Note: Also romanized as Shūr Mast) is a village in Rastupey Rural District of the Central District in Savadkuh County, Mazandaran province, Iran.

== Demographics ==
=== Population ===
At the time of the 2006 National Census, the village's population was 187 in 56 households. The following census in 2011 counted 80 people in 34 households. The 2016 census measured the population of the village as 270 people in 111 households.
