= Kalim =

Kalim may refer to:

- Kalim, Iran, a village in Mazandaran Province, Iran
- Mírzá Músá (died 1887), an Apostle of Bahá'u'lláh
- Shah Kalim Allah Jahanabadi, (died 1729), a late seventeenth to early eighteenth century Indian Chisti Sufi master
