= Sartangeh, Mazandaran =

Sartangeh سرتنگه
- Village
- Country: Iran
- Province: Mazandaran
- County: Savadkuh
- Bakhsh: Central
- Rural District: Rastupey

Population (2006)
  - Total: 10
- Time zone: UTC+3:30 (IRST)

Sartangeh (Persian: سرتنگه) is a village in Rastupey Rural District, in the Central District of Savadkuh County, Mazandaran Province, Iran. At the 2006 census, its population was 10, in 5 families. In 2016 there were less than 4 households residing in the village.
