= Shur Ab, Mazandaran =

Shur Ab شوراب
- Village
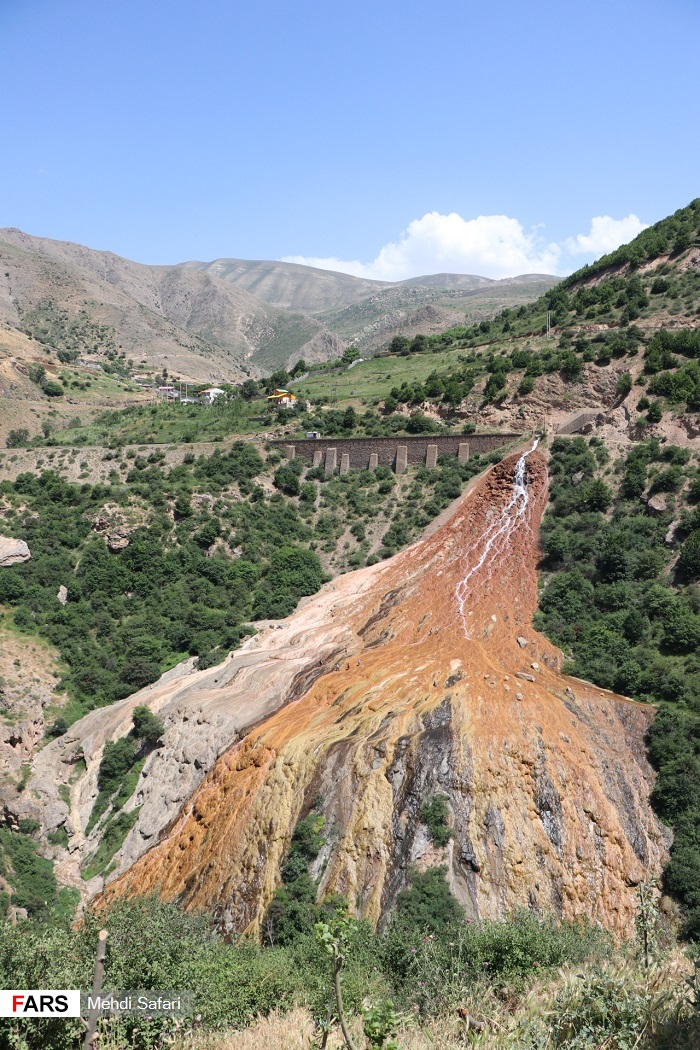

- Location within Iran
- Coordinates: 35°51′44″N 52°57′55″E
- Country: Iran
- Province: Mazandaran
- County: Savadkuh
- Bakhsh: Central
- Rural District: Rastupey

Population (2016)
  - Total: 183
- Time zone: UTC+3:30 (IRST)

Shur Ab (Persian: شوراب, also Romanized as Shūr Āb) is a village in Rastupey Rural District, in the Central District of Savadkuh County, Mazandaran Province, Iran. At the 2016 census, its population was 183, in 81 families. Up from 112 people in 2006.
