= Road 79 (Iran) =

Road in Iran

Road 79
- جاده 79
- Firuzkuh Road
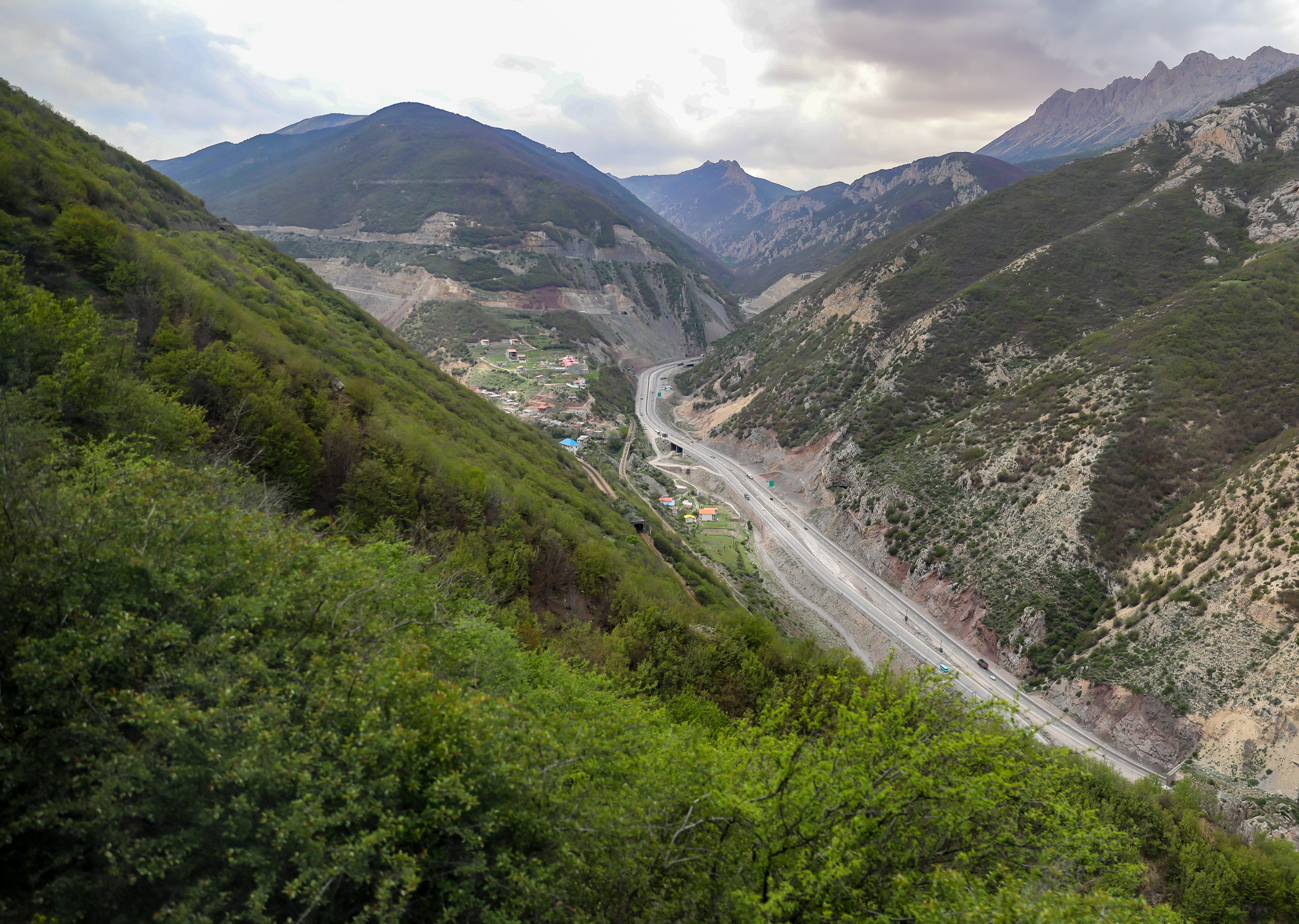

Route information
- Length: 247 km (153 mi)

Major junctions
- From: Rudehen, Tehran; Road 77
- Road 36
- To: Qaem Shahr, Mazandaran; Road 22

Location
- Country: Iran
- Provinces: Tehran, Mazandaran
- Major cities: Firuzkuh, Tehran Province; Damavand, Tehran Province; Pol-e Sefid, Mazandaran Province; Zirab, Mazandaran; Shirgah, Mazandaran

Highway system
- Highways in Iran; Freeways

Road 79 or Firuzkuh Road or Savadkuh Road is one of the major roads running north from Tehran, crossing over the Central Alborz mountain range, and down to the coast of the Caspian Sea in Iran.

It route is within Tehran Province and Mazandaran Province.

== History ==
Firoozkooh Road, also known as Savadkooh Road, is the oldest road from Mazandaran Province to Tehran Province after Chalus Road and Haraz Road in terms of its opening date. The construction of this road took about 16 years.

== Route ==
From North to South
Al-Ghadeer Unlevel Intersection	Gorgan-Sari-Rasht Expressway; East to Qaem Shahr - Sari - Gorgan; West to Babol - Amol - Chalus
Mahdavi Expressway
Mahdavi Expressway
	Salehi Mazandarani Boulevard; Towards Qaem Shahr - City Center
Qaem Shahr
	Vailabad
	Sari-Qaemshahr Freeway; Towards Sari - Gorgan
	Beshel
	Ahangar Kola; Towards Nizami Road - Qaem Shahr
Shirgah Service Station
Shirgah
	Timuri Street; Towards Shirgah - City Center - Babol
	Afshar Street; Towards Shirgah Railway Station - Shirgah - City Center - Babol
Shirgah
	Javarem Forest Park
	Javarem
Zirab
Imam Square	Towards Zirab Railway Station - Zirab - City Center
Zirab
Pol-e Sefid
	Alasht - Savadkouh Azad University
Darkhosh Martyrs Square	Towards Pol-e Sefid - City Center
Pol-e Sefid Municipality Service Station
	Railway Street; Towards Pol-e Sefid Railway Station - Pol-e Sefid - City Center
Shohada Square	Towards Pol-e Sefid Railway Station - Pol-e Sefid - City Center
	Shahid Nezhadi Street; Towards Ozod Road
	Beheshti Street; Towards Shur Mast- Karafarin Square - Pol-e Sefid - City Center
Pol-e Sefid Municipality Service Station
	Sang Deh
Shahid Soleimani Square	Towards Sang Deh - Pol-e Sefid - City Center
Pol-e Sefid
	Shurmast Industrial Town
Cham Cham Service Station
	Cham Cham Forest Park
	Ekhvat Tomb
	Do Ab; Towards Savadkouh Railway Station
	Khatirkouh Road; Towards Shahmirzad - Semnan
	Arfa Deh
	Urim
	Veresk; Towards Versk Railway Station - Veresk Bridge
Gadouk Pass
	Dogal; Towards Dugal Railway Station
	Shur Ab
Mazandaran Province; Tehran Province
	Gadouk; Towards Gadouk Railway Station
Gadouk Pass
Alborz Service Station
	Sar Chaman
	Amiriyeh
	Firuzkuh-Semnan-Taybad Expressway; Towards Semnan - Sorkheh -Mashhad
Firuzkuh
Sepah Square	Pasdaran Street; Towards Firuzkuh Railway Station - Firuzkuh - City Center
	Valiasr Street; Towards Firuzkuh Islamic Azad University - Firuzkuh - City Center
Imam Ali Square	Pasdaran Street; Towards Firuzkuh Railway Station - Firuzkuh - City Center
Firuzkuh Municipality Service Station
Firuzkuh
	Tares; Towards Lasem - Pleur - Amol
	Harandeh
	Aminabad
	Seyyedabad; Towards Simindasht
Sayedabad Service Station
	Sarbandan
	Jaban
	Absard
Apple Service Station
Damavand
	Beheshti Street; Towards Damavand - City Center - Amol
Damavand
	Besat Boulevard; Towards Damavand - City Center - Amol
	Roudehen Islamic Azad University
Rudehen
	Bumehen Southern Bypass Freeway; Towards Pardis - Tehran
	Haraz Road; North to Amol - Sari - Gorgan; West to Bumehen - Pardis - Tehran
From South to North

== See also ==
- Alborz (Elburz) mountain range topics
- Roads in Iran

== Central Alborz mountain range map ==
Map of central Alborz	Peaks:	1 Alam-Kuh
−25 to 500 m (−82 to 1,640 ft) 500 to 1,500 m (1,600 to 4,900 ft) 1,500 to 2,500 m (4,900 to 8,200 ft) 2,500 to 3,500 m (8,200 to 11,500 ft) 3,500 to 4,500 m (11,500 to 14,800 ft) 4,500 to 5,610 m (14,760 to 18,410 ft)	2 Azad Kuh	3 Damavand
−25 to 500 m (−82 to 1,640 ft) 500 to 1,500 m (1,600 to 4,900 ft) 1,500 to 2,500 m (4,900 to 8,200 ft) 2,500 to 3,500 m (8,200 to 11,500 ft) 3,500 to 4,500 m (11,500 to 14,800 ft) 4,500 to 5,610 m (14,760 to 18,410 ft)	4 Do Berar	5 Do Khaharan
−25 to 500 m (−82 to 1,640 ft) 500 to 1,500 m (1,600 to 4,900 ft) 1,500 to 2,500 m (4,900 to 8,200 ft) 2,500 to 3,500 m (8,200 to 11,500 ft) 3,500 to 4,500 m (11,500 to 14,800 ft) 4,500 to 5,610 m (14,760 to 18,410 ft)	6 Ghal'eh Gardan	7 Gorg
−25 to 500 m (−82 to 1,640 ft) 500 to 1,500 m (1,600 to 4,900 ft) 1,500 to 2,500 m (4,900 to 8,200 ft) 2,500 to 3,500 m (8,200 to 11,500 ft) 3,500 to 4,500 m (11,500 to 14,800 ft) 4,500 to 5,610 m (14,760 to 18,410 ft)	8 Kholeno	9 Mehr Chal
−25 to 500 m (−82 to 1,640 ft) 500 to 1,500 m (1,600 to 4,900 ft) 1,500 to 2,500 m (4,900 to 8,200 ft) 2,500 to 3,500 m (8,200 to 11,500 ft) 3,500 to 4,500 m (11,500 to 14,800 ft) 4,500 to 5,610 m (14,760 to 18,410 ft)	10 Mishineh Marg	11 Naz
−25 to 500 m (−82 to 1,640 ft) 500 to 1,500 m (1,600 to 4,900 ft) 1,500 to 2,500 m (4,900 to 8,200 ft) 2,500 to 3,500 m (8,200 to 11,500 ft) 3,500 to 4,500 m (11,500 to 14,800 ft) 4,500 to 5,610 m (14,760 to 18,410 ft)	12 Shah Alborz	13 Sialan
−25 to 500 m (−82 to 1,640 ft) 500 to 1,500 m (1,600 to 4,900 ft) 1,500 to 2,500 m (4,900 to 8,200 ft) 2,500 to 3,500 m (8,200 to 11,500 ft) 3,500 to 4,500 m (11,500 to 14,800 ft) 4,500 to 5,610 m (14,760 to 18,410 ft)	14 Tochal	15 Varavašt
−25 to 500 m (−82 to 1,640 ft) 500 to 1,500 m (1,600 to 4,900 ft) 1,500 to 2,500 m (4,900 to 8,200 ft) 2,500 to 3,500 m (8,200 to 11,500 ft) 3,500 to 4,500 m (11,500 to 14,800 ft) 4,500 to 5,610 m (14,760 to 18,410 ft)	Rivers:	0
−25 to 500 m (−82 to 1,640 ft) 500 to 1,500 m (1,600 to 4,900 ft) 1,500 to 2,500 m (4,900 to 8,200 ft) 2,500 to 3,500 m (8,200 to 11,500 ft) 3,500 to 4,500 m (11,500 to 14,800 ft) 4,500 to 5,610 m (14,760 to 18,410 ft)	1 Alamut	2 Chalus
−25 to 500 m (−82 to 1,640 ft) 500 to 1,500 m (1,600 to 4,900 ft) 1,500 to 2,500 m (4,900 to 8,200 ft) 2,500 to 3,500 m (8,200 to 11,500 ft) 3,500 to 4,500 m (11,500 to 14,800 ft) 4,500 to 5,610 m (14,760 to 18,410 ft)	3 Do Hezar	4 Haraz
−25 to 500 m (−82 to 1,640 ft) 500 to 1,500 m (1,600 to 4,900 ft) 1,500 to 2,500 m (4,900 to 8,200 ft) 2,500 to 3,500 m (8,200 to 11,500 ft) 3,500 to 4,500 m (11,500 to 14,800 ft) 4,500 to 5,610 m (14,760 to 18,410 ft)	5 Jajrood	6 Karaj
−25 to 500 m (−82 to 1,640 ft) 500 to 1,500 m (1,600 to 4,900 ft) 1,500 to 2,500 m (4,900 to 8,200 ft) 2,500 to 3,500 m (8,200 to 11,500 ft) 3,500 to 4,500 m (11,500 to 14,800 ft) 4,500 to 5,610 m (14,760 to 18,410 ft)	7 Kojoor	8 Lar
−25 to 500 m (−82 to 1,640 ft) 500 to 1,500 m (1,600 to 4,900 ft) 1,500 to 2,500 m (4,900 to 8,200 ft) 2,500 to 3,500 m (8,200 to 11,500 ft) 3,500 to 4,500 m (11,500 to 14,800 ft) 4,500 to 5,610 m (14,760 to 18,410 ft)	9 Noor	10 Sardab
−25 to 500 m (−82 to 1,640 ft) 500 to 1,500 m (1,600 to 4,900 ft) 1,500 to 2,500 m (4,900 to 8,200 ft) 2,500 to 3,500 m (8,200 to 11,500 ft) 3,500 to 4,500 m (11,500 to 14,800 ft) 4,500 to 5,610 m (14,760 to 18,410 ft)	11 Seh Hazar	12 Shahrood
−25 to 500 m (−82 to 1,640 ft) 500 to 1,500 m (1,600 to 4,900 ft) 1,500 to 2,500 m (4,900 to 8,200 ft) 2,500 to 3,500 m (8,200 to 11,500 ft) 3,500 to 4,500 m (11,500 to 14,800 ft) 4,500 to 5,610 m (14,760 to 18,410 ft)	Cities:	1 Amol
−25 to 500 m (−82 to 1,640 ft) 500 to 1,500 m (1,600 to 4,900 ft) 1,500 to 2,500 m (4,900 to 8,200 ft) 2,500 to 3,500 m (8,200 to 11,500 ft) 3,500 to 4,500 m (11,500 to 14,800 ft) 4,500 to 5,610 m (14,760 to 18,410 ft)	2 Chalus	3 Karaj
−25 to 500 m (−82 to 1,640 ft) 500 to 1,500 m (1,600 to 4,900 ft) 1,500 to 2,500 m (4,900 to 8,200 ft) 2,500 to 3,500 m (8,200 to 11,500 ft) 3,500 to 4,500 m (11,500 to 14,800 ft) 4,500 to 5,610 m (14,760 to 18,410 ft)	Other:	D Dizin
−25 to 500 m (−82 to 1,640 ft) 500 to 1,500 m (1,600 to 4,900 ft) 1,500 to 2,500 m (4,900 to 8,200 ft) 2,500 to 3,500 m (8,200 to 11,500 ft) 3,500 to 4,500 m (11,500 to 14,800 ft) 4,500 to 5,610 m (14,760 to 18,410 ft)	E Emamzadeh Hashem	K Kandovan Tunnel
−25 to 500 m (−82 to 1,640 ft) 500 to 1,500 m (1,600 to 4,900 ft) 1,500 to 2,500 m (4,900 to 8,200 ft) 2,500 to 3,500 m (8,200 to 11,500 ft) 3,500 to 4,500 m (11,500 to 14,800 ft) 4,500 to 5,610 m (14,760 to 18,410 ft)	* Latyan Dam	** Lar Dam
