= Chehel Dar Castle =

Castle in Mazandaran Province, Iran

Chehel Dar castle
- قلعه چهل در
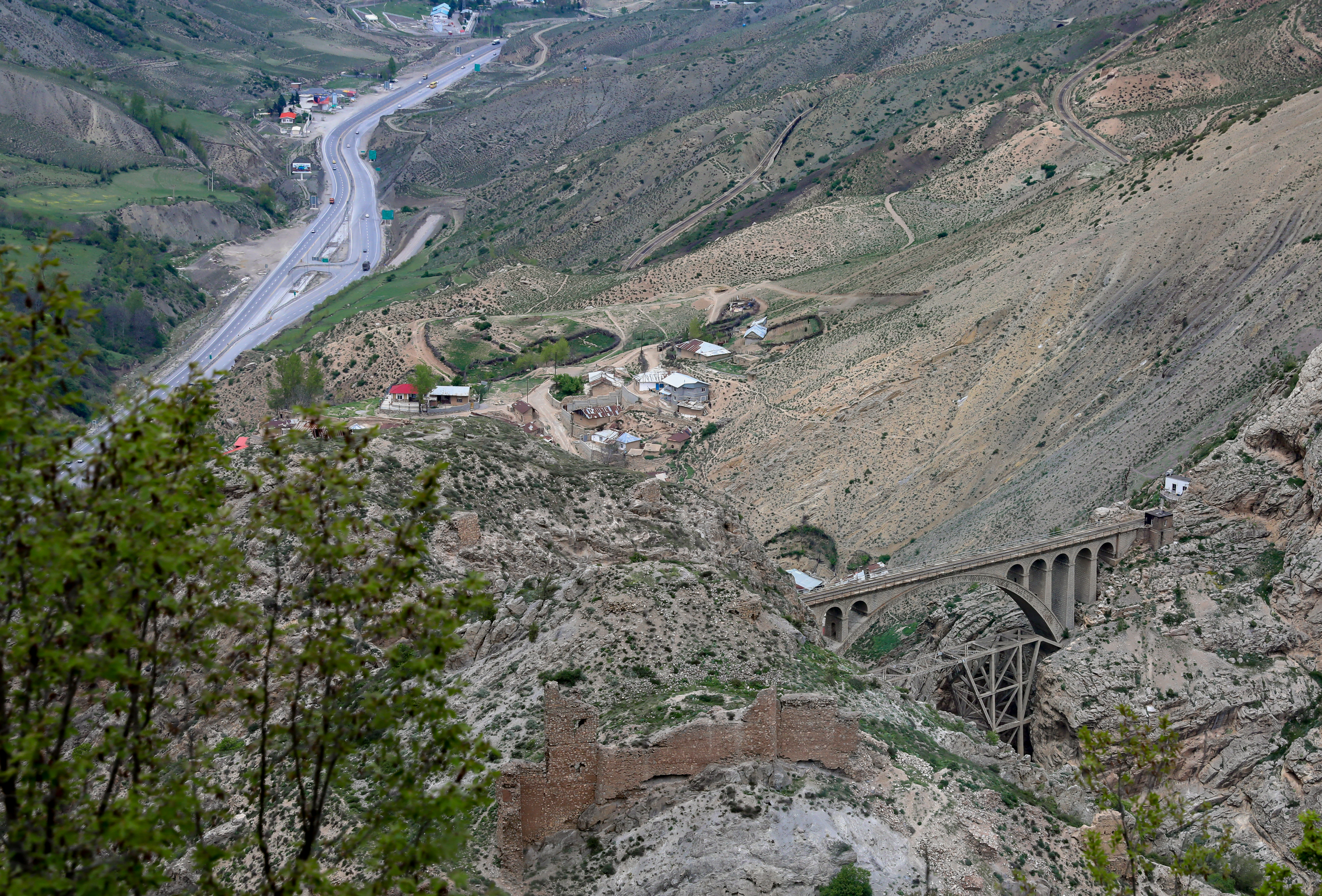

General information
- Type: Castle
- Location: Savadkuh County, Iran

Chehel Dar castle (Persian: قلعه چهل در) is a historical castle located in Savadkuh County in Mazandaran Province, The longevity of this fortress dates back to the 6th and 7th centuries AH.
