= Arfa Deh =

Village in Mazandaran province, Iran

Arfa Deh Persian: ارفع ده
- Village
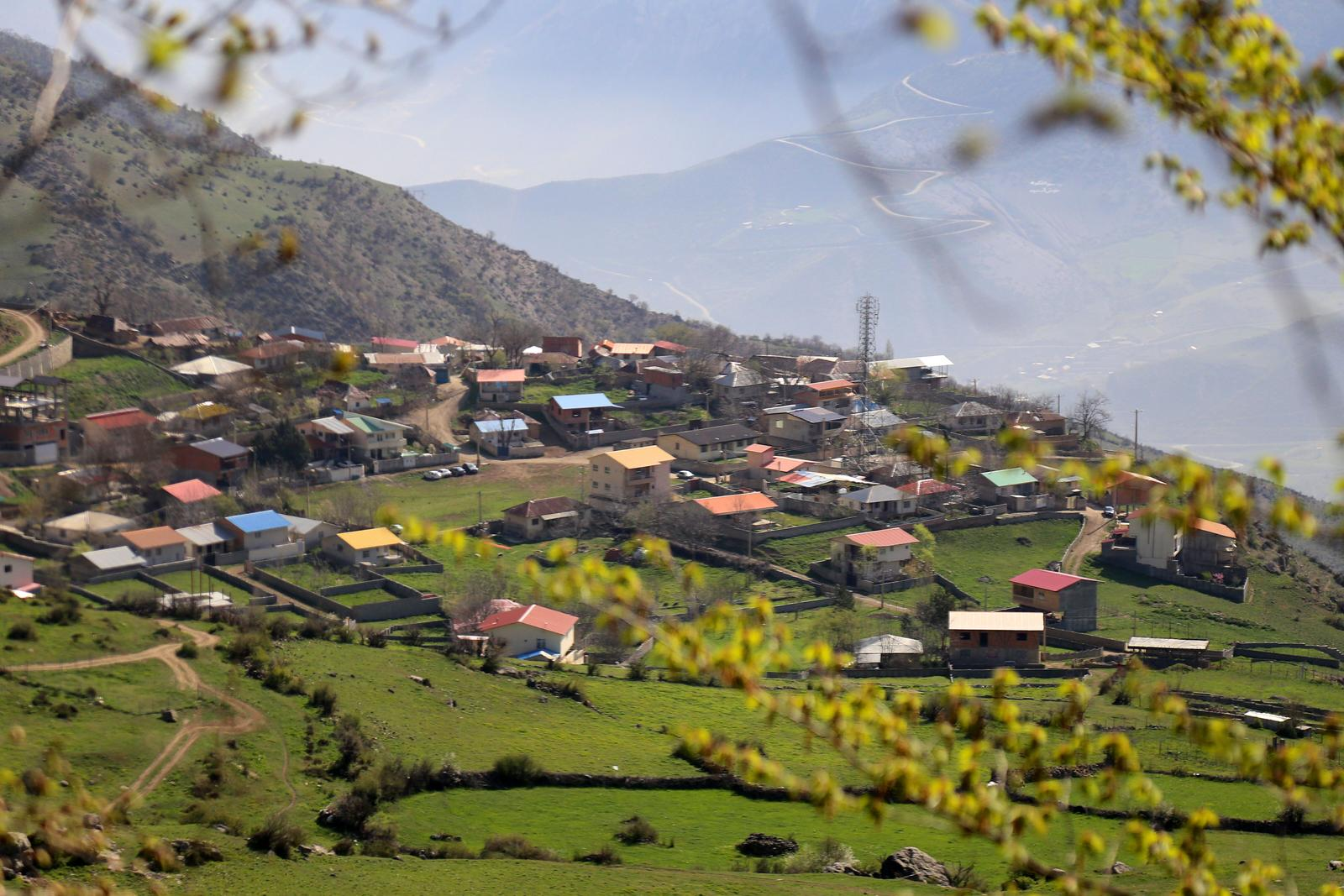
- The village of Arfa Deh

- Location within Iran
- Coordinates: 35°59′11″N 53°00′32″E
- Country: Iran
- Province: Mazandaran
- County: Savadkuh
- District: Central
- Rural District: Rastupey

Population (2016)
  - Total: 384
- Time zone: UTC+3:30 (IRST)

Arfa Deh (Persian: ارفع ده) (Note: Also romanized as Arfa‘ Deh; also known as Afarūdbār, Arfa‘ Rūdbār, Arfeh Deh, and Arfeh Kūh) is a village in Rastupey Rural District of the Central District in Savadkuh County, Mazandaran province, Iran.

== Demographics ==
=== Population ===
At the time of the 2006 National Census, the village's population was 379 in 99 households. The following census in 2011 counted 329 people in 102 households. The 2016 census measured the population of the village as 384 people in 132 households.

== Gallery ==
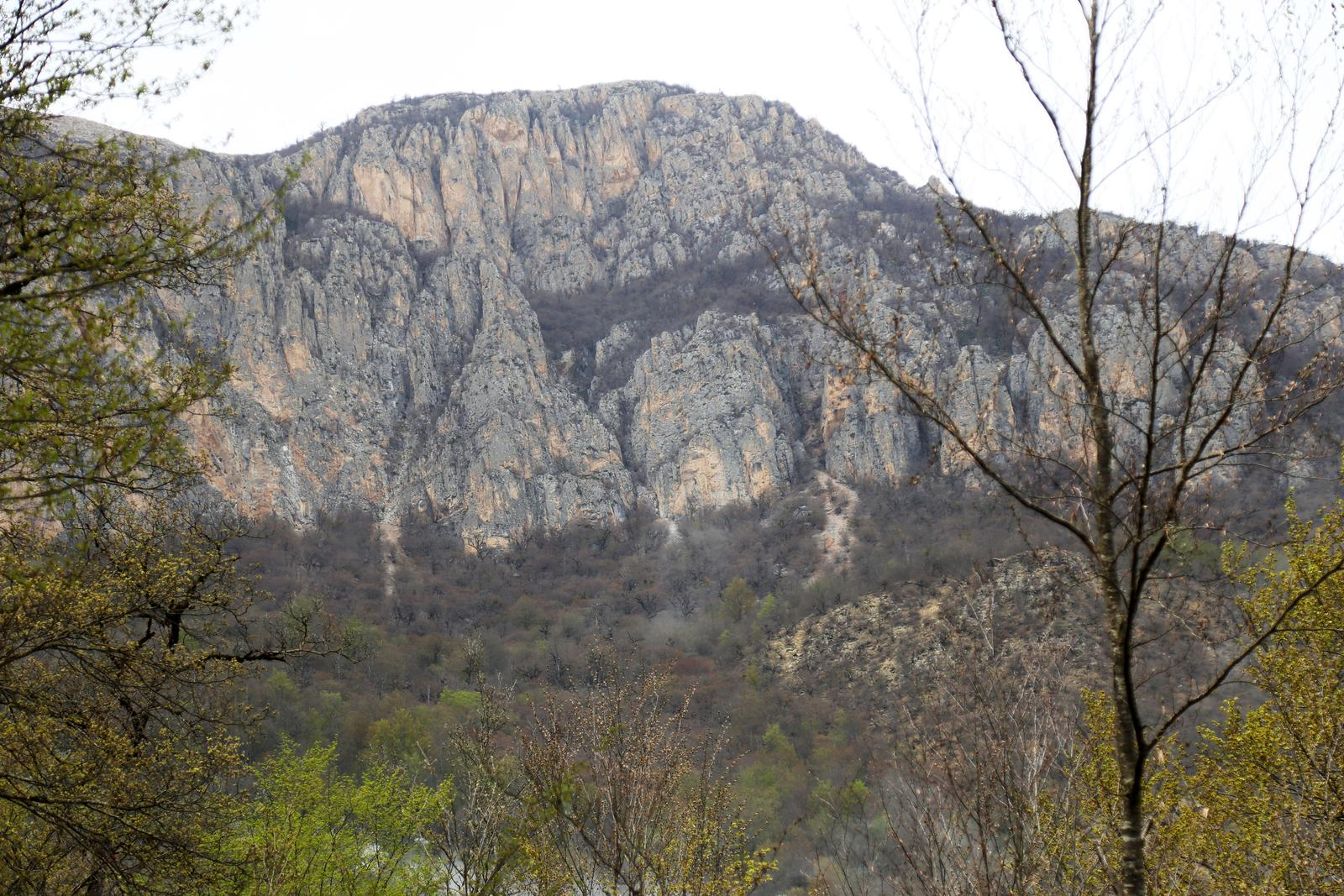
Arfa Kuh (Mount Arfa)

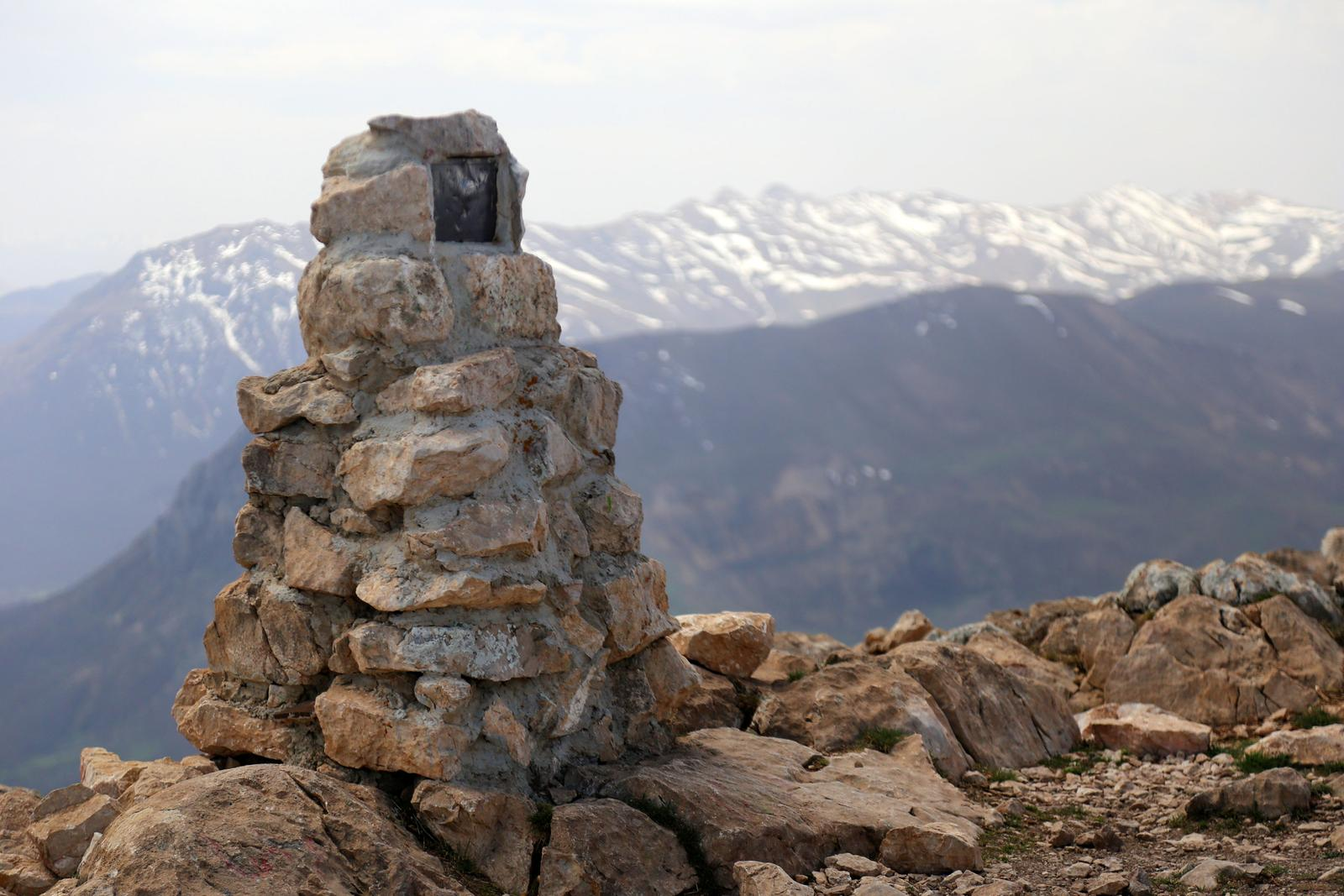
Arfa Kuh summit

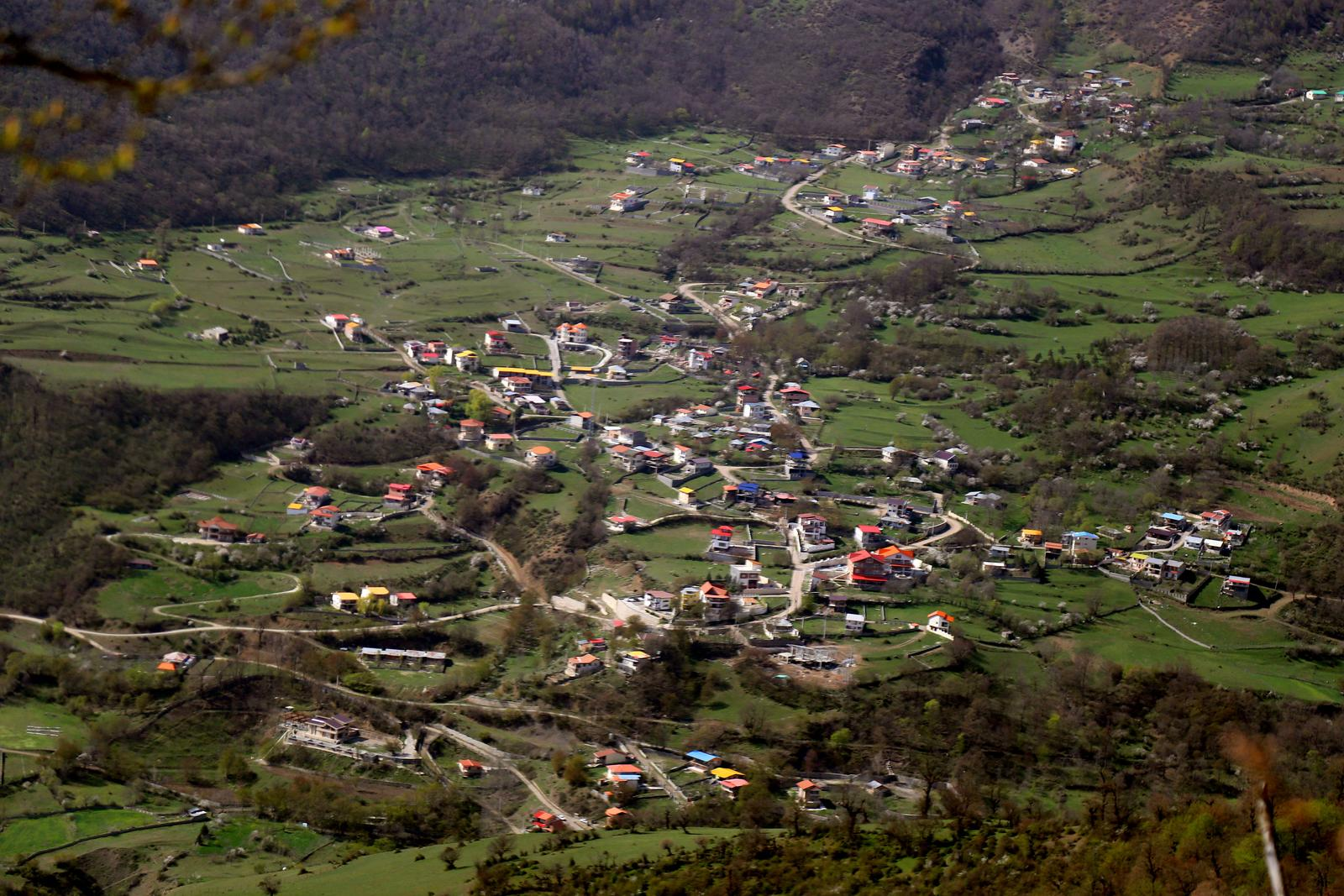
The village of Arfa Deh
