= Veresk, Iran =

Village in Mazandaran province, Iran

Veresk Persian: ورسک
- Village
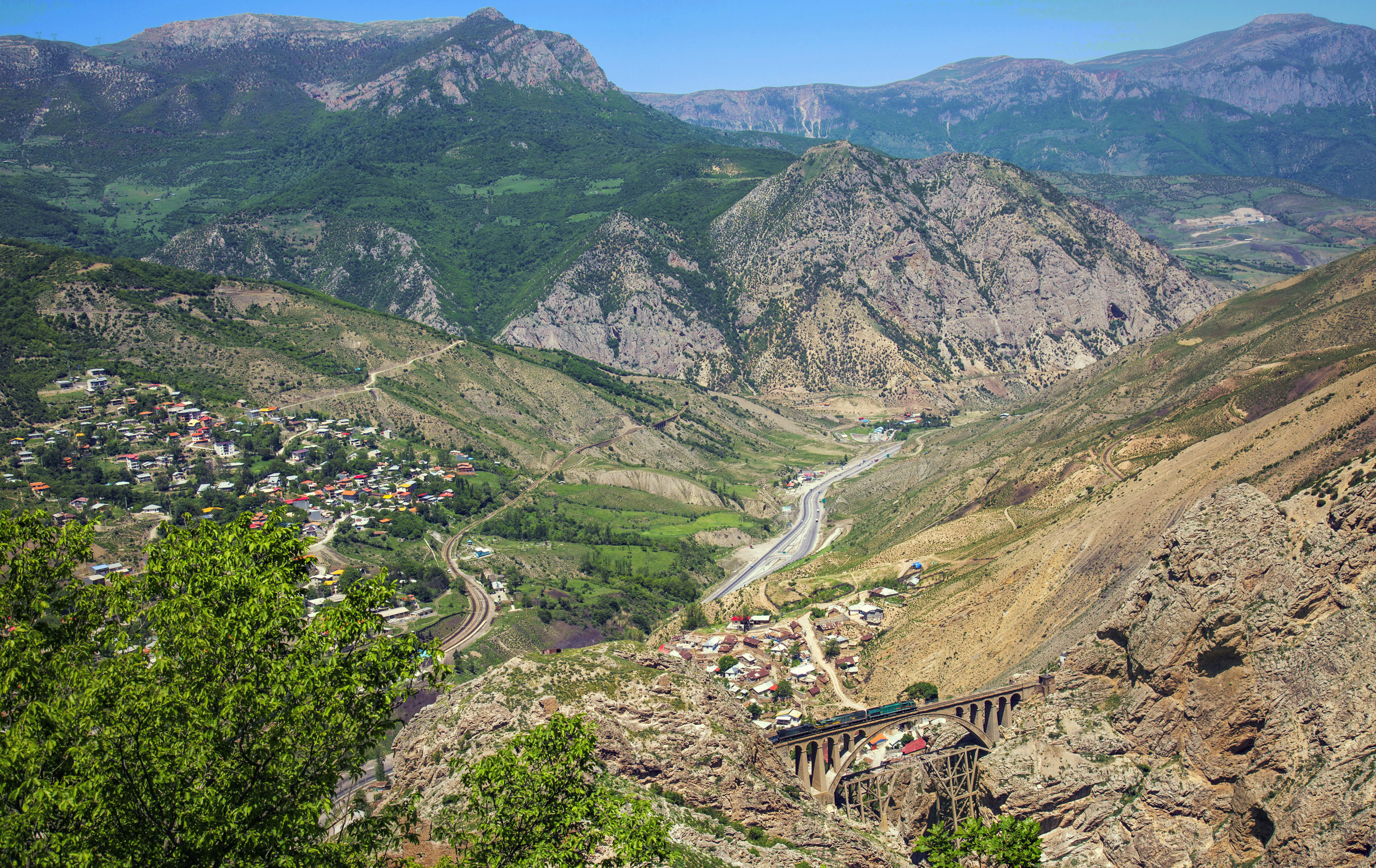
- The village of Veresk

- Location within Iran
- Coordinates: 35°54′28″N 52°58′59″E
- Country: Iran
- Province: Mazandaran
- County: Savadkuh
- District: Central
- Rural District: Rastupey

Population (2016)
  - Total: 807
- Time zone: UTC+3:30 (IRST)

Veresk (Persian: ورسک) (Note: Also known as Varīsk) is a village in Rastupey Rural District of the Central District in Savadkuh County, Mazandaran province, Iran.

== Demographics ==
=== Population ===
At the time of the 2006 National Census, the village's population was 1,460 in 398 households. The following census in 2011 counted 1,084 people in 350 households. The 2016 census measured the population of the village as 807 people in 285 households, the most populous in its rural district.
