= Bernat, Iran =

Village in Mazandaran province, Iran

Bernat Persian: برنت
- Village
- Location within Iran
- Coordinates: 36°00′05″N 53°09′01″E
- Country: Iran
- Province: Mazandaran
- County: Savadkuh
- District: Central
- Rural District: Rastupey

Population (2016)
  - Total: 206
- Time zone: UTC+3:30 (IRST)

Bernat (Persian: برنت) is a village in Rastupey Rural District of the Central District in Savadkuh County, Mazandaran province, Iran.

== Demographics ==
=== Population ===
At the time of the 2006 National Census, the village's population was 55 in 18 households. The following census in 2011 counted 315 people in 91 households. The 2016 census measured the population of the village as 287 people in 92 households.
