= Owlad Castle =

Castle in Mazandaran Province, Iran

- قلعه اولاد
- Interactive map of the Owlad Castle area

General information
- Type: Castle
- Location: Savadkuh County, Iran

Owlad Castle (Persian: قلعه اولاد) is a historical castle located in Savadkuh County in Mazandaran Province, The longevity of this fortress dates back to the Sasanian Empire.
