= Rastupey Rural District =

Rural district in Mazandaran province, Iran

Rastupey Rural District Persian: دهستان راستوپي
- Rural District
- Location within Iran
- Coordinates: 36°00′N 53°02′E
- Country: Iran
- Province: Mazandaran
- County: Savadkuh
- District: Central
- Capital: Shur Mast-e Rudbar

Population (2016)
  - Total: 7,529
- Time zone: UTC+3:30 (IRST)

Rastupey Rural District (Persian: دهستان راستوپي) is in the Central District of Savadkuh County, Mazandaran province, Iran. Its capital is the village of Shur Mast-e Rudbar.

== Demographics ==
=== Population ===
At the time of the 2006 National Census, the rural district's population was 7,084 in 2,022 households. There were 7,557 inhabitants in 2,294 households at the following census of 2011. The 2016 census measured the population of the rural district as 7,529 in 2,731 households. The most populous of its 71 villages was Veresk, with 807 people.

=== Other villages in the rural district ===
- Aleban
- Anarom
- Arfa Deh
- Arim
- Arzhang Rudbar
- Asadabad
- Aseh
- Azan Deh
- Bagh-e Sorkhabad
- Bala Do Ab
- Baye Kola
- Bernat
- Darka Rudbar
- Deh Mian
- Dehkhoda
- Dowgol Station
- Ejet
- Emaft
- Esas
- Estakhr Sar
- Folurd
- Garzin Kheyl
- Kalim
- Kamar Posht
- Kangolu
- Kerman
- Kord Asiab
- Kuh-e Estel
- Laluk
- Lamzer
- Mali Darreh
- Melerd
- Owrim
- Owrim Rudbar
- Pain Do Ab
- Pelpa
- Pit Sara
- Posht-e Gol
- Rajeh
- Sang Sarag
- Sar Chaleshk
- Sartangeh
- Sefiddar Goleh
- Shur Ab
- Shur Mast
- Shurek Chal
- Simet
- Tale
- Tale-e Rudbar
- Varpey
- Vesiyeh Sar
- Zal Darreh
- Ziarat Sar
