= Kangelo =

Village in Mazandaran province, Iran

Kangelo کنگلو
- Village
- Location within Iran
- Coordinates: 35°56′52″N 53°09′32″E
- Province: Mazandaran
- County: Savadkuh
- Bakhsh: Central
- Rural District: Rastupey

Population (2016)
  - Total: 66
- Time zone: UTC+3:30 (IRST)

Kangelo (Persian: کنگلو; also known as Kangelou) is a village in Rastupey Rural District, in the Central District of Savadkuh County, Mazandaran Province, Iran. Kangelo Castle dates back to the Sassanian empire.

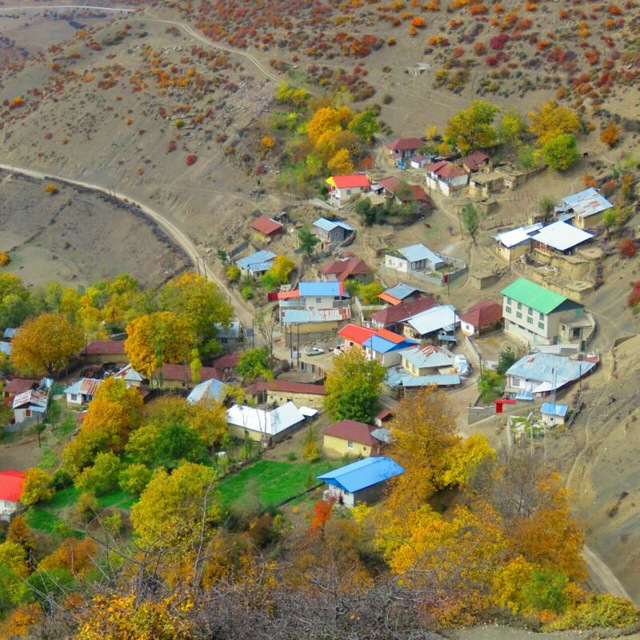
