= Veresk =

Russian alcoholic beverage company

Veresk is an alcoholic drink producing company. It is located in Kashin, Russia in the Tver Oblast.

Veresk was founded in 1901. In 1992, it became a corporation under the name of ОАО «Вереск» (Veresk), and in 1996 it began to be called the open stock corporation «Кашинский ликеро-водоч-ный завод «Вереск» (Veresk Liquor-Vodka Factory of Kashin).

== Products ==
- Bitter brewed beverage "ТВЕРСКАЯ" (Tverskaya)
- Brewed beverage "ТВЕРСКАЯ брусничная" (Tverskaya Brusnichanya)
- Brewed beverage "РЯБИНОВАЯ на коньяке" (Riabnovaya na konyake)
- Brewed beverage "СМОРОДИНОВАЯ" (Smorodinaya)
- Brewed beverage "ЧЕРЕМУХОВАЯ" (Cheremuhovaya)
- Brewed beverage "КЛЮКВЕННАЯ" (Klyukvenaya)
- Bitter brewed beverage "ДЖИН" (Gin)
- Bitter brewed beverage "ВЕРЕСКОВЫЙ МЕД " (Vereskovyi Med)
- Tonic "СТАРЫЙ КАШИН" (Staryi Kashin)
- Vodka "МИРОВАЯ" (Mirovaya)
- Vodka "ПРЕСТОЛЬНАЯ" (Prestolnaya)
- Vodka "АФАНАСИЙ НИКИТИН" (Afanasii Nikitin)
- Vodka "ХЛЕБНАЯ особая" (Hlebnaya Osobaya)
- Vodka "ТВЕРЬ" (Tver)
- Vodka "РУССКАЯ особая" (Ruskaya Osobaya)
- Low alcohol cocktails
- Mineral water "АННА КАШИНСКАЯ" (Anna Kashinskaya)
- Cream-liqueur "СОЛО" (Solo) with cream
- Liqueur "КОФЕЙНЫЙ" (Kofeinyi)
