= Central District (Savadkuh County) =

District in Mazandaran province, Iran

Central District (Savadkuh County) Persian: بخش مرکزی شهرستان سوادكوه
- District
- Location within Iran
- Coordinates: 36°00′N 52°57′E
- Country: Iran
- Province: Mazandaran
- County: Savadkuh
- Capital: Pol-e Sefid

Population (2016)
  - Total: 22,537
- Time zone: UTC+3:30 (IRST)

The Central District of Savadkuh County (Persian: بخش مرکزی شهرستان سوادكوه) is in Mazandaran province, Iran. Its capital is the city of Pol-e Sefid.

== History ==
In 2012, Kaseliyan and Sorkhkola Rural Districts, and the city of Zirab, were separated from the district in the formation of Zirab District.

== Demographics ==
=== Population ===
At the time of the 2006 National Census, the district's population was 42,679 in 11,396 households. The following census in 2011 counted 40,969 people in 12,545 households. The 2016 census measured the population of the district as 22,537 inhabitants in 7,831 households.

=== Administrative divisions ===
Central District (Savadkuh County) Population
Administrative Divisions	2006	2011	2016
Kaseliyan RD (Note: Transferred to Zirab District)	3,872	4,064	
Rastupey RD	7,084	7,557	7,529
Sorkhkola RD	520	552	
Valupey RD	3,538	4,535	5,521
Alasht (city)	976	874	1,193
Pol-e Sefid (city)	8,473	7,708	8,294
Zirab (city)	18,216	15,679	
Total	42,679	40,969	22,537
RD = Rural District
