= Savadkuh County =

County in Mazandaran province, Iran

Savadkuh County Persian: شهرستان سوادكوه
- County
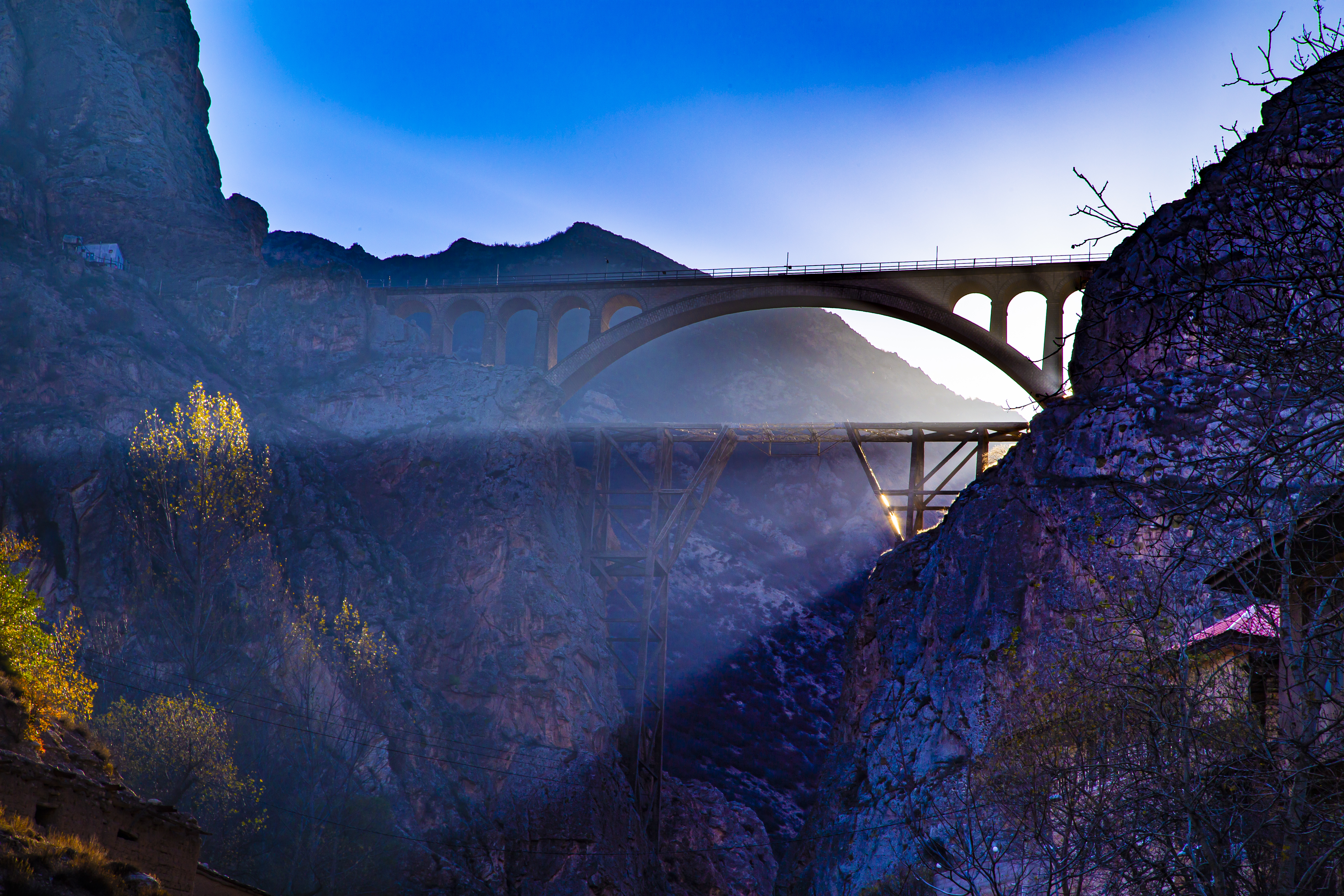
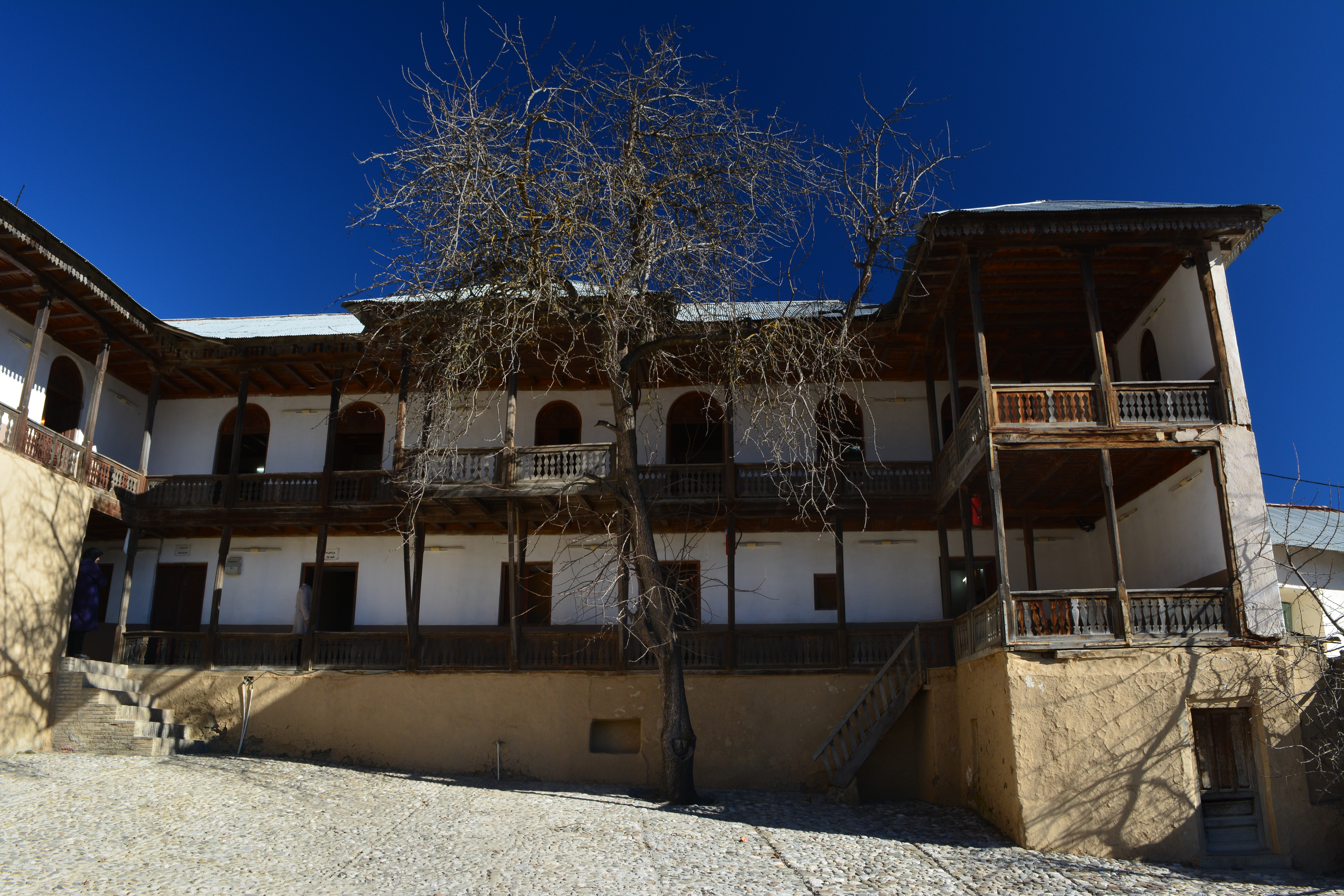
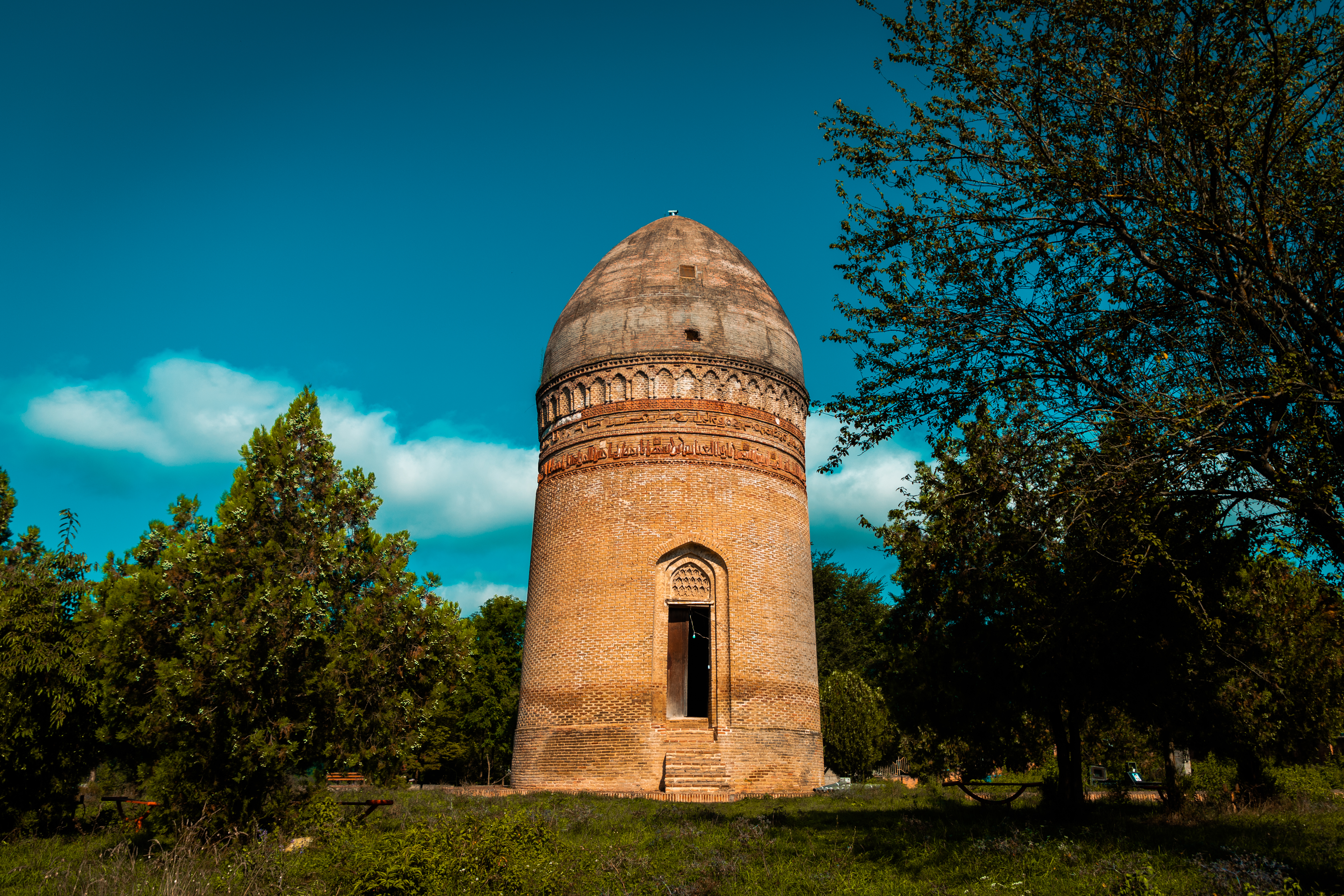
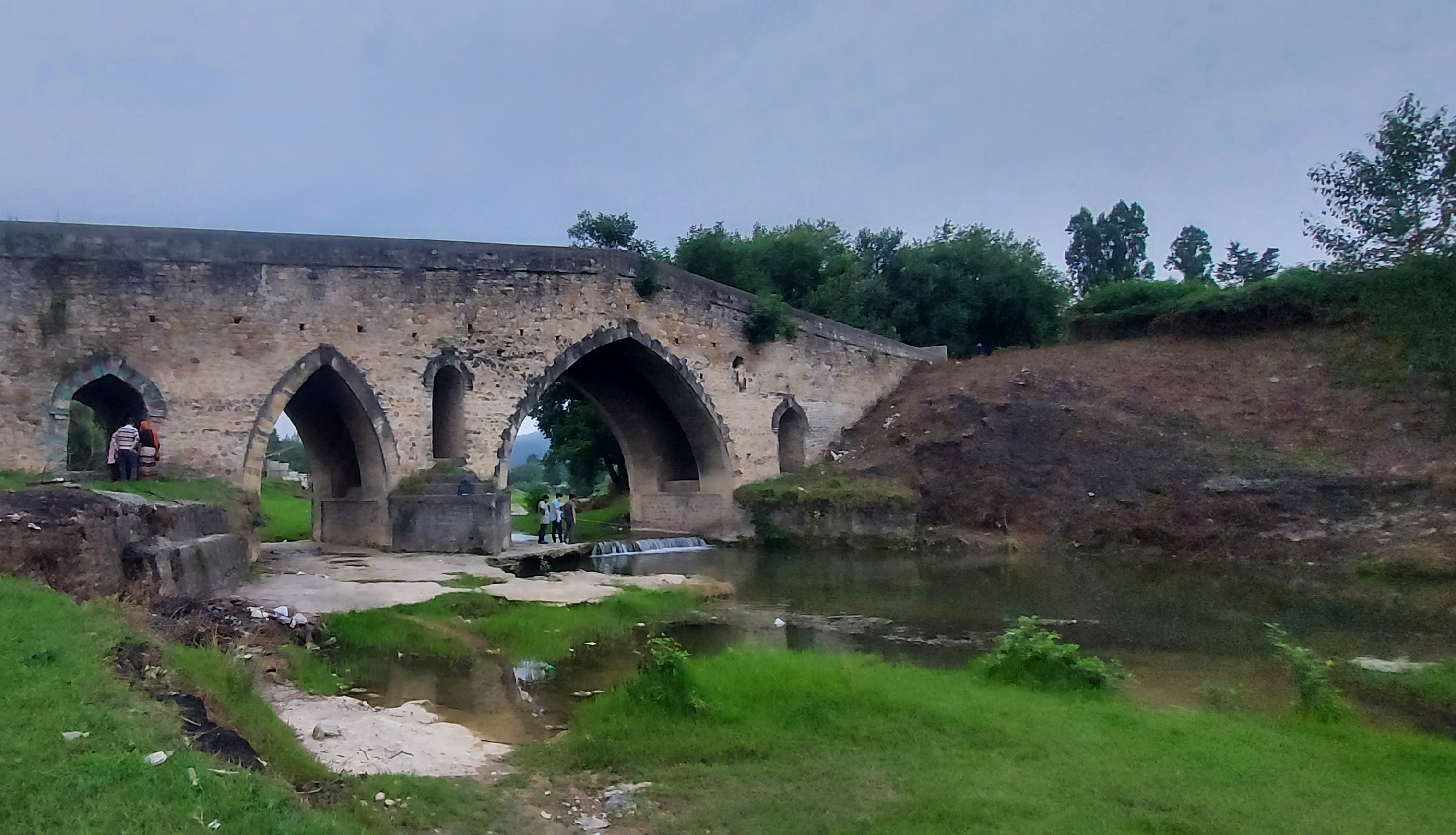
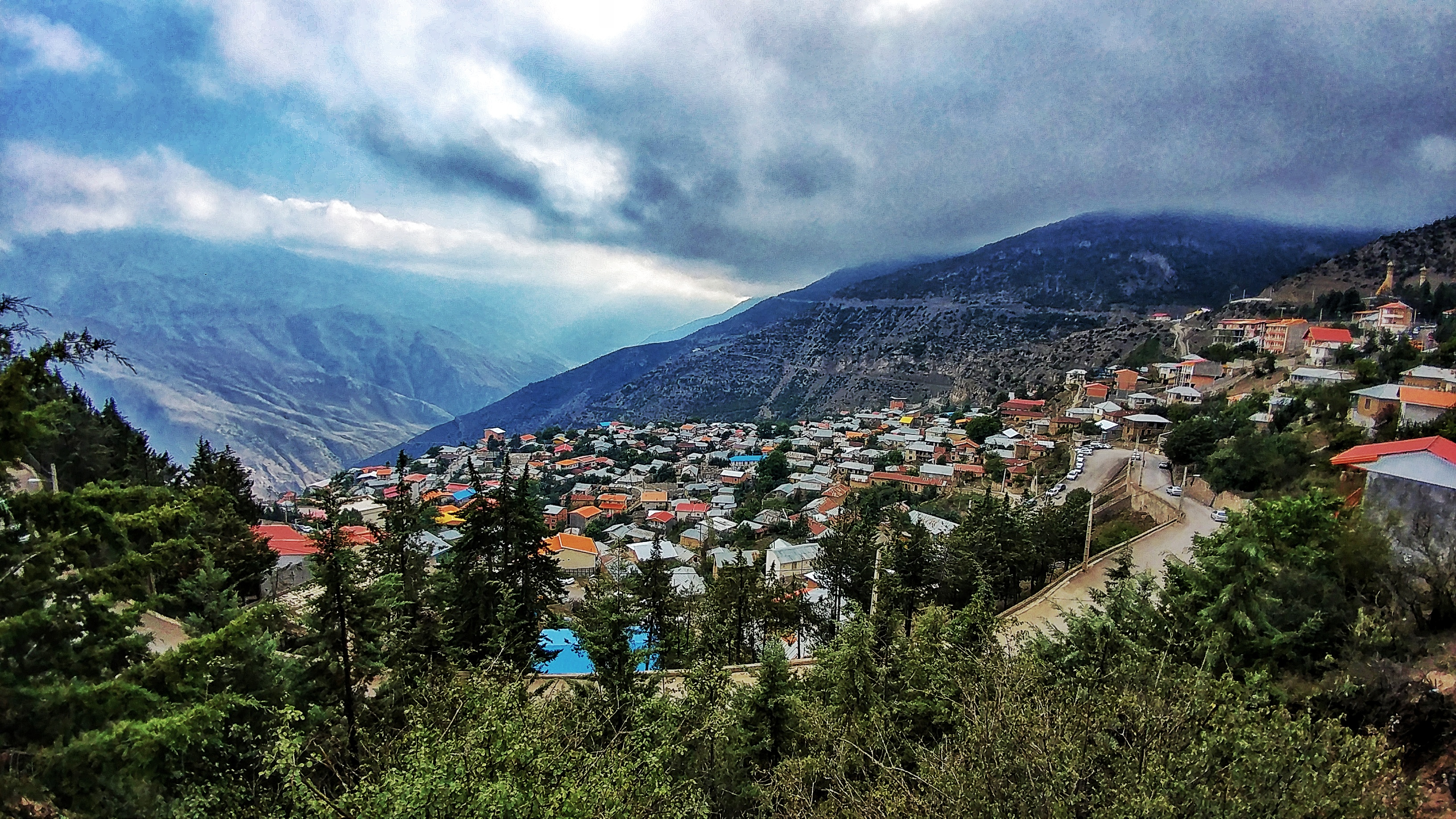
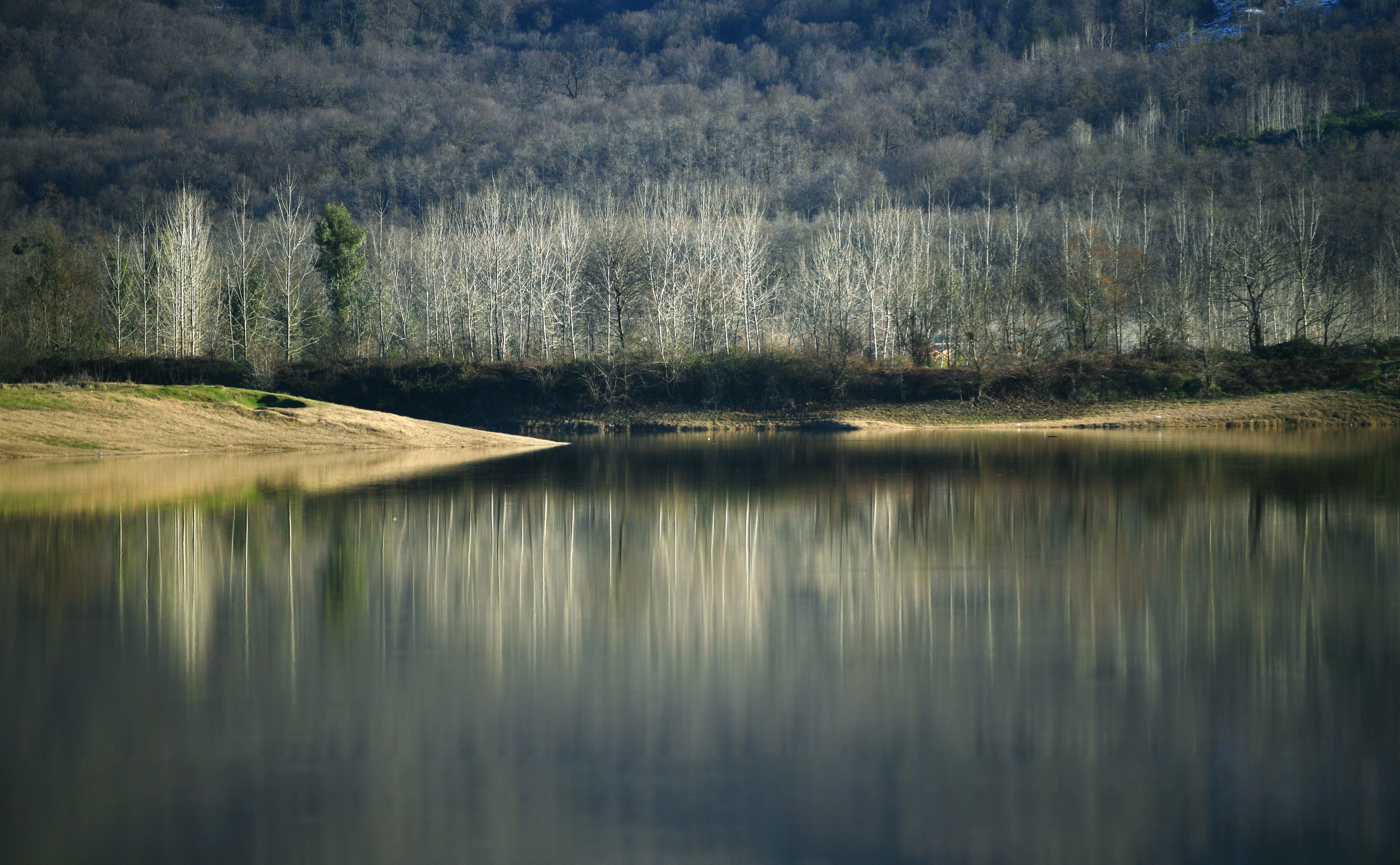
- Kangelo, Savadkuh

- Location of Savadkuh County in Mazandaran province (bottom, yellow)

- Location of Mazandaran province in Iran
- Coordinates: 36°06′N 52°56′E
- Country: Iran
- Province: Mazandaran
- Capital: Pol-e Sefid
- Districts: Central, Zirab

Area
  - Total: 2,078.00 km^{2} (802.32 sq mi)

Population (2016)
  - Total: 43,913
  - Density: 21.132/km^{2} (54.733/sq mi)
- Time zone: UTC+3:30 (IRST)

Savadkuh County (Persian: شهرستان سوادكوه) (Note: Also romanized as Ŝahrestāne Sawādkuh, Savadkooh, and Savadkouh) is in Mazandaran province, Iran. Its capital is the city of Pol-e Sefid.

== History ==
Darius the Great, the Achaemenid monarch, mentions Pâtišvâreš in the Behistun inscription as one of the territories under his rule. This Old Persian form subsequently became Middle Persian Pateŝxârgar and, following the Arab conquest, Perso-Arabic Faršavâdjar. The Greek historiographer Strabo records this name as Prâxovâtrâs.

In his inscription at Ka'ba-ye Zartosht, the second Sassanid monarch Shapur I, refers to the region as Pâdešxâr. In the Book of Deeds of Ardashir, Son of Babag, it is Patešxâr again. Ibn Isfandiyar and Mir Zahir al-Din Mar'ashi – the old geographers of Mazandaran – give its name as Patešxârgar as a large area in present-day Mazandaran, including Azerbaijan, Gilan, Tabaristan, Kumesh and Damghan.

Mohammad Hassan Khan (Etemad Saltaneh's Tadvin Fi Ahval Jebal Shervin, History of Savadkuh) mentions it as the old name of the ancient area of Savâdkuh. They believe that the word "Savad" was distorted and changed to Faršavât. Savadkuh enjoyed great importance in the history of Tabaristan and even in Iran.

Its tall mountains were the feudal seats of the Bavand dynasty, with which the Karan-Vands were allied. They defended the area against the invasions of the Amawid and Abbasids and tried to preserve their Zoroastrian religion and culture. The existence of numerous fortresses and military fortifications that date to the 8th–10th centuries vindicate this claim. In addition, Lajim tower with its 10th century brick-face inscription in Pahlavi script demonstrates the attention of the Savâdkuhs to the script, language and customs of their ancestors. The population of this region composed many poems, describing the heroic efforts and bravery of their notables.

=== Administrative changes ===
In 2012, Kaseliyan and Sorkhkola Rural Districts, and the city of Zirab, were separated from the Central District in the formation of Zirab District. In 2013, Shirgah District was separated from the county in the establishment of North Savadkuh County.

== Demographics ==
=== Language ===
The languages spoken in Savadkuh are Mazandarani and Persian, for the major part; and Mazandarani and Persian for the inhabitants of the villages. Its native inhabitants are Shiite Muslims.

=== Population ===
At the time of the 2006 National Census, the county's population was 66,430 in 17,918 households. The following census in 2011 counted 64,378 people in 19,506 households. The 2016 census measured the population of the county as 43,913 in 14,956 households.

=== Administrative divisions ===
Savadkuh County's population history and administrative structure over three consecutive censuses are shown in the following table.

Savadkuh County Population
Administrative Divisions	2006	2011	2016
Central District	42,679	40,969	22,537
Kaseliyan RD	3,872	4,064	
Rastupey RD	7,084	7,557	7,529
Sorkhkola RD	520	552	
Valupey RD	3,538	4,535	5,521
Alasht (city)	976	874	1,193
Pol-e Sefid (city)	8,473	7,708	8,294
Zirab (city)	18,216	15,679	
Shirgah District (Note: Transferred to North Savadkuh County)	23,751	23,409	
Lafur RD	4,826	4,493	
Sharq va Gharb-e Shirgah RD	10,396	10,787	
Shirgah (city)	8,529	8,129	
Zirab District			21,376
Kaseliyan RD			4,217
Sorkhkola RD			968
Zirab (city)			16,191
Total	66,430	64,378	43,913
RD = Rural District

== Geography ==
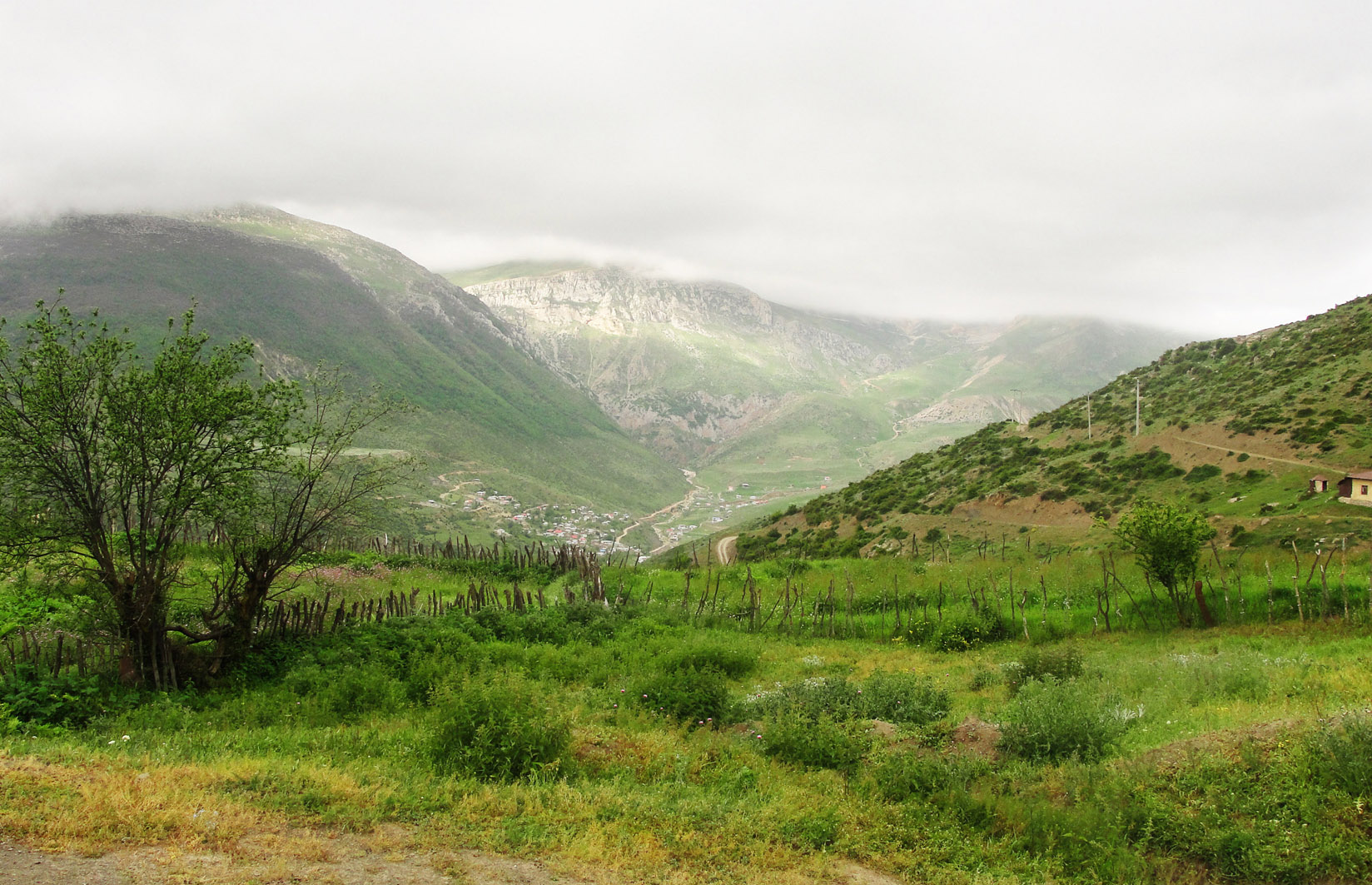
Derasele, Savadkuh

Covering an area of 2,441 square kilometres (942 mi^{2}), Savadkuh is at the centre of Mazandaran Province. It is limited northwestward by North Savadkuh County, westward by Babol County, eastward by Sari County, southward by the Alborz mountain range and Tehran province, and southeast by Semnan province. The main part of this county is located in a valley, in the central Alborz region, where the Tâlâr river passes through it. There are 250 seasonal and permanent villages.

The tallest summit of Savadkuh, is Khero-Naru, with a height of 3,620 metres (11,880 ft). The most important rivers flowing in the city are Tâlâr and Babol-rud, which originate from the Alborz mountain range southeast and southwest of Savadkuh. These rivers irrigate the farmlands in Babol, Babolsar and Qaemŝahr. Including two areas of mountain in the north and foothill in the south, the mountainous area has a temperate and humid climate, and the weather in the south is dry and cold.

== Economy ==
The farmlands in Savadkuh are limited because of its large forests and mountainous areas. So the farmers use their crops themselves, including rice, wheat, barley and sugar cane. According to geographical features, the economy of this city is based on apiculture and animal husbandry, more than agriculture.

== Natural attractions ==
The most important natural attractions of Savadkuh are: Ŝur Mast lake, near a village by the same name, Gazu waterfall in Lafur hamlet, waterfalls of Shirga and Gaduk, the mountains of Arfa Kuh, Sangar and Qadamgah, in Rassto Pei hamlet and Shervin mountain in Valu Pei hamlet; and Alasht city.

== Historical sites and landmarks ==
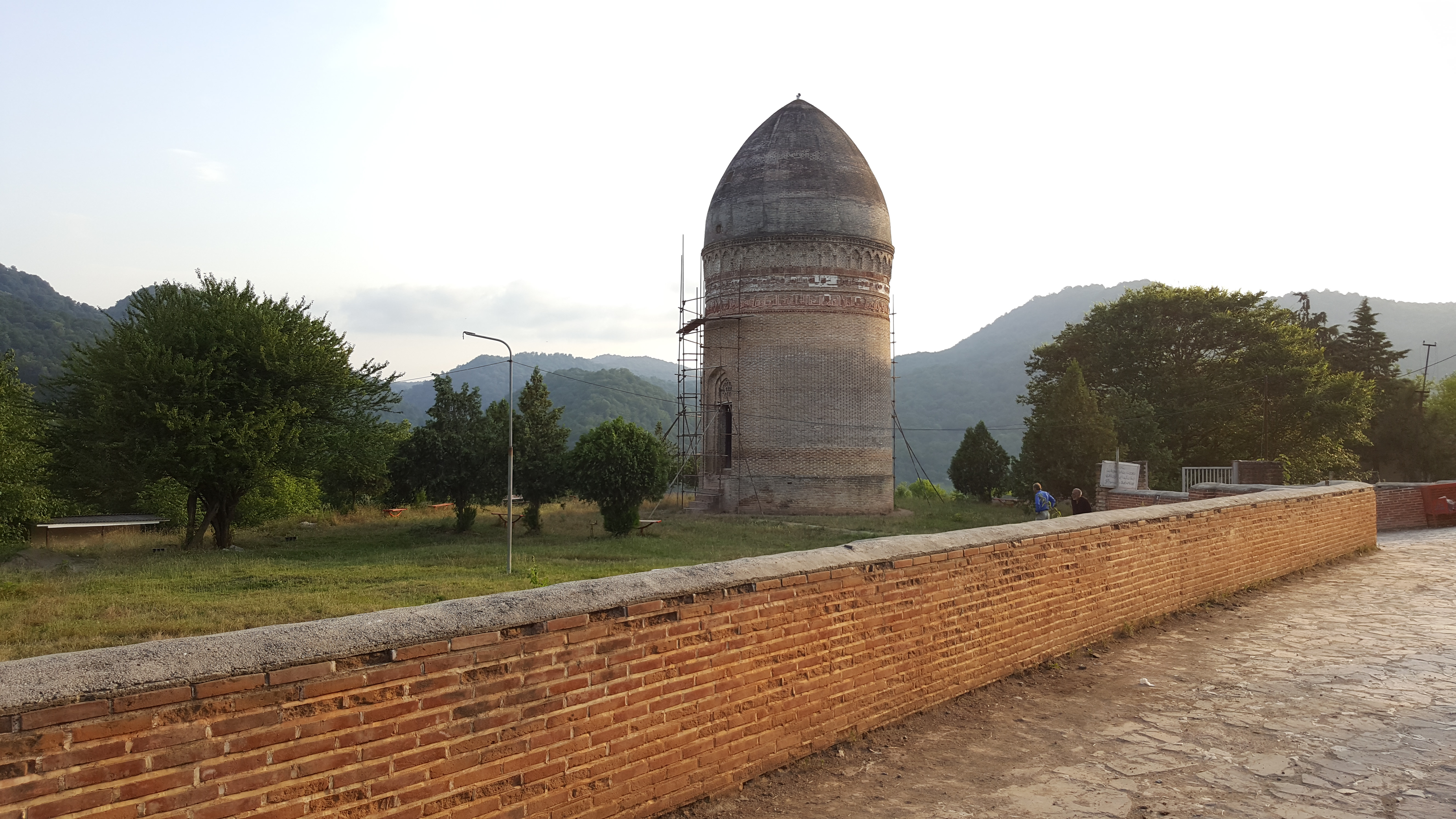
Lajim Tower

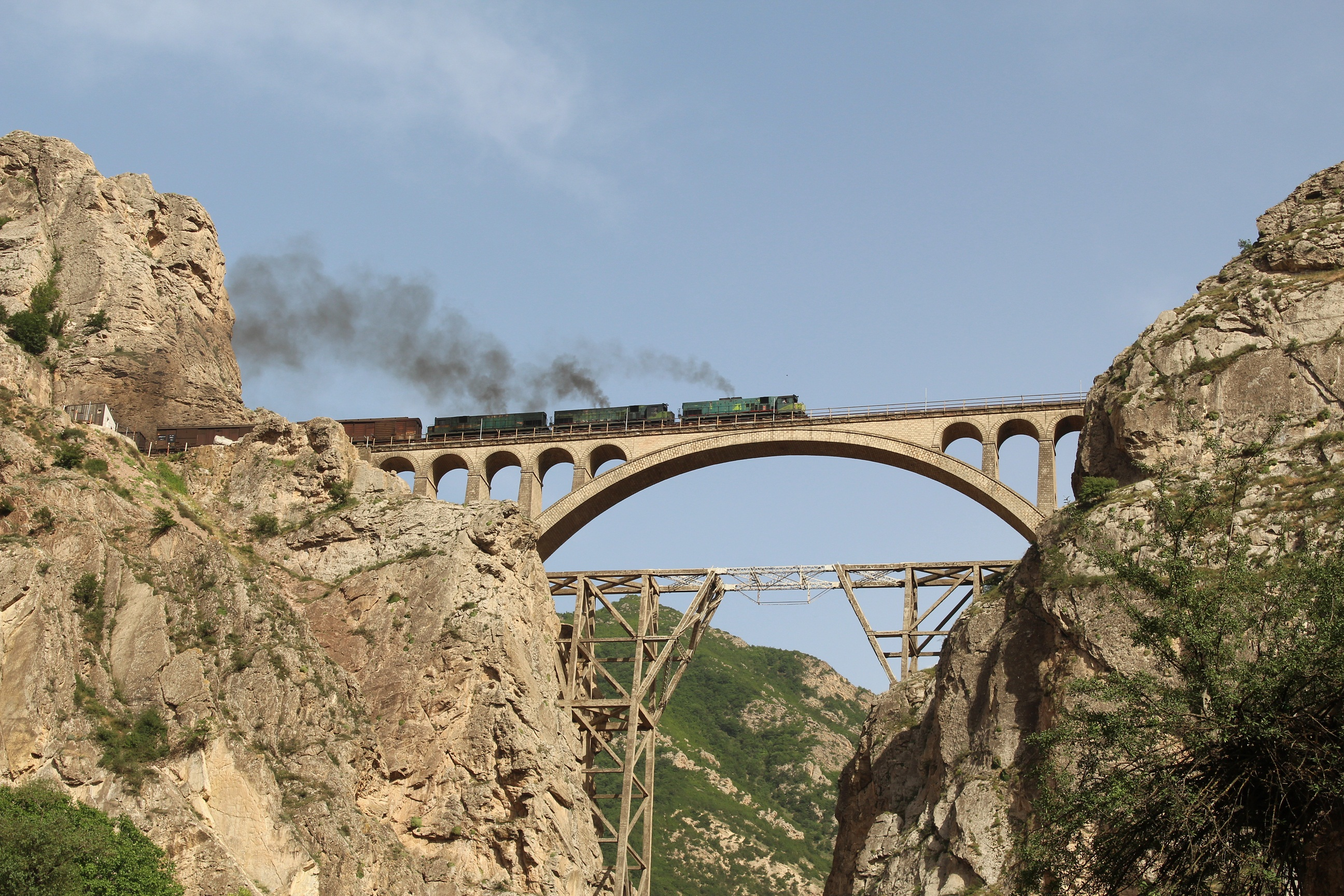
Veresk Bridge

=== Veresk Bridge ===
The Veresk Bridge is a masonry arch bridge in northern Iran. It was constructed mostly by Austrians before World War II and during the reign of Reza Shah under the leadership of an engineer named Walter Aigner. It is located in the Veresk district of Savadkuh County, in Mazandaran province.

During World War II, it was known as the Pol-e Piroozi ("The bridge of victory"). The bridge stands 110 metres (360 ft) tall and its arch measures 66 metres (217 ft) long. The bridge serves the Trans-Iranian Railway network in Northern Iran. The Veresk bridge connects the railway between Tehran and the Caspian Sea region. It is located in Mazandaran Veresk district of Savadkuh, 85 kilometers south of Ghaemshahr and connects two of the mountains in the Abbas Abad region. The bridge is one of the masterpieces of the Danish engineering firm Kampsax, (consisting of Danish, German and Austrian engineers) serving the Trans-Iranian Railway network in Northern Iran. The construction of this bridge included craftsmen of many nationalities, including many Italian. The Master Carpenter for the construction of the lumber concrete forms was Giacomo Di Marco, from the Friuli region of Italy, and detailed in the book he authored. It has been said after finishing the bridge, people had a fear that the train wouldn't be able to pass the narrow bridge and that it would break. As a result, the engineer and his family stood under it when the first train passed the bridge (local accounts claim that Reza Shah had asked them to do so anyway).

=== Lajim Tower ===
Lajim Tower, also known as Tomb Tower of Lajim, is a tall cylindrical tower in the village of Lajim in Mazandaran province, Iran. The tower was built around 1022 AD. The Lajim inscriptions includes the first documented example of the word qubba referring to the domed structure of the building. There is no doubt that the Lajim Tower was the mausoleum of an unknown Persian prince of Tabaristan.

=== Kangelo Castle ===
Kangelo Castle is a historical fortress located in Savadkuh and in the village of Kangelo. The Kangelo Castle was constructed in the Sasanian era. According to historians, the castle of Kangelo was used as a place to worship the mirta.

=== Espahbod Khorshid Cave ===
This cave is located between the railway station of Pol-e Sefid and Surkh Abad, in the vicinity of Do Ab. It was discovered in 1956. The cave has a simple area or hall, with a ceiling 80 m. in width and height, and is considered spectacular in the world. Near this cave is a remnant of a ruined castle and tower, which was once a beautiful structure of stone and mortar. This cave is also known as Dej-e-Afsanehie, and this was most probably the defense center of the House of Ispahbudhan of Mazandaran in the past.

=== Balu Bridge ===
Located along the Shirgah-Zirab road, near Talar river, it was made of fired bricks and mortar. The main part of this bridge was destroyed because of breaking, and now two herring-bone-shaped arches remained intact. One of them is 3 metres (9.8 ft) wide and 4.75 metres (15.6 ft) high, and another is 4.5 metres (15 ft) wide and 5.50 metres (18.0 ft) high. According to its architectural features, it probably dates back to before the Safavid dynasty.

=== Urim Rudbar Church ===
This monument was built, following the erection of the northern Iranian railway. It was used for religious ceremonies by foreign personnel. The church consists of a chamber, measuring 4.20 by 5.20 metres (13.8 by 17.1 ft). With a height of 4 metres (13 ft), it houses a prayer niche and four cement candlesticks. The construction was made of stone and cement.

== Notable people ==
Savadkuh is the birthplace of Reza Shah, the founder of the Pahlavi dynasty, and Habibollah Badiee, a noted musician.

== See also ==
Media related to Savadkuh County at Wikimedia Commons
