= Seyyedabad =

Seyyedabad or Seydabad (Persian: صيداباد) may refer to:

== Alborz Province ==
- Seyyedabad, Alborz, a village in Savojbolagh County

== Ardabil Province ==
- Seyyedabad, Ardabil, a village in Germi County

== East Azerbaijan Province ==
- Seyyedabad, East Azerbaijan, a village in Varzaqan County

== Fars Province ==
- Seyyedabad, Bavanat, a village in Bavanat County

== Gilan Province ==
- Seyyedabad, Gilan, a village in Fuman County

== Golestan Province ==
- Seyyedabad, Golestan, a village in Azadshahr County
- Seydabad, Golestan, a village in Torkaman County

== Hamadan Province ==
- Seydabad, Hamadan, a village in Famenin County

== Hormozgan Province ==
- Seyyedabad, Hormozgan, a village in Bandar Abbas County

== Isfahan Province ==
- Seyyedabad, Isfahan, a village in Isfahan County
- Seyyedabad, Shahin Shahr and Meymeh, a village in Shahin Shahr and Meymeh County

== Kerman Province ==
- Seyyedabad, Anbarabad, a village in Anbarabad County
- Seyyedabad-e Ilkhani, a village in Anbarabad County
- Seyyedabad, Bam, a village in Bam County
- Seyyedabad, Razmavaran, a village in Rafsanjan County
- Seyyedabad, Ravar, a village in Ravar County

== Kohgiluyeh and Boyer-Ahmad Province ==
- Seyyedabad, Kohgiluyeh and Boyer-Ahmad, a village in Charam County

== Kurdistan Province ==
- Seyyedabad-e Jamian, a village in Saqqez County

== Lorestan Province ==
- Seyyedabad, Lorestan, a village in Azna County

== Markazi Province ==
- Seyyedabad, Khomeyn, a village in Khomeyn County
- Seyyedabad, Komijan, a village in Komijan County
- Seydabad, Markazi, a village in Saveh County
- Seyyedabad, Zarandieh, a village in Zarandieh County

== Mazandaran Province ==
- Seyyedabad, Mazandaran, a village in Savadkuh County
- Seyyedabad, Sari, a village in Sari County

== North Khorasan Province ==
- Seyyedabad, Bojnord, a village North Khorasan Province, Iran

== Qazvin Province ==
- Seyyedabad, Qazvin, a village in Iran

== Qom Province ==
- Seydabad, Qom, a village in Iran
- Seyyedabad, Qom, a village in Iran
- Seydabad, Jafarabad, a village in Qom Province, Iran
- Sadabad, Qom, a village in Iran

== Razavi Khorasan Province ==
- Seyyedabad, Chenaran, a village in Chenaran County
- Seyyedabad, Golbajar, a village in Chenaran County
- Seyyedabad-e Akrad, a village in Joghatai County
- Seyyedabad, Khvaf, a village in Khvaf County
- Seyyedabad, Ahmadabad, a village in Mashhad County
- Seyyedabad, Darzab, a village in Mashhad County
- Seyyedabad, Mashhad, a village in Mashhad County
- Seyyedabad, Nishapur, a village in Nishapur County
- Seyyedabad, Sarvelayat, a village in Nishapur County
- Seyyedabad-e Asadollah Khan, a village in Nishapur County
- Seyyedabad-e Bar Madan, a village in Nishapur County
- Seyyedabad, Rashtkhvar, a village in Rashtkhvar County
- Seyyedabad-e Kalut, a village in Sabzevar County
- Seyyedabad, Torbat-e Jam, a village in Torbat-e Jam County

== Semnan Province ==
- Seydabad, Semnan, a village in Damghan County
- Seyyedabad, Semnan, a village in Semnan County

== Sistan and Baluchestan Province ==
- Seyyedabad, Bampur, a village in Bampur County
- Seyyedabad, Chabahar, a village in Chabahar County

== South Khorasan Province ==
- Seyyedabad, Birjand, a village in Birjand County
- Seyyedabad, Fakhrud, a village in Darmian County
- Seyyedabad, Qohestan, a village in Darmian County
- Seyyedabad, Tabas, a village in Tabas County

== Tehran Province ==
- Seyyedabad, Damavand, a village in Damavand County

== West Azerbaijan Province ==
- Seyyedabad, Bukan, a village in Bukan County
- Seyyedabad-e Qajer, a village in Bukan County
- Seyyedabad, Mahabad, a village in Mahabad County

== Yazd Province ==
- Seyyedabad, Bafq, a village in Bafq County
- Seyyedabad, Meybod, a village in Meybod County

== Zanjan Province ==
- Seydabad, Zanjan, a village in Ijrud County

== See also ==
- Saidabad (disambiguation)
- Sayed Abad, Afghanistan
