= Saidabad (disambiguation) =

Saidabad is a city in Hyderabad, India.

Saidabad or Saiyidabad (Persian: سعيداباد) may also refer to:

== Afghanistan ==
- Saydabad District, a district in Maidan Wardak Province, Afghanistan
  - Saydabad, the capital of Saydabad District, Maidan Wardak, Afghanistan

== Iran ==
- Saidabad Rural District (disambiguation), administrative subdivisions of Iran

=== Alborz Province ===
- Saidabad, Alborz, a village in Alborz Province, Iran

=== Ardabil Province ===
- Saidabad, Ardabil, a village in Namin County
- Saidabad, Nir, a village in Nir County

=== Bushehr Province ===
- Saidabad, Bushehr, a village in Bushehr Province, Iran

=== East Azerbaijan Province ===
- Saidabad, Bostanabad, a village in Bostanabad County
- Saidabad, Maragheh, a village in Maragheh County

=== Golestan Province ===
- Saidabad, Golestan, a village in Torkaman County

=== Hamadan Province ===
- Saiyidabad, alternate name of Seydabad, Hamadan, a village in Famenin County

=== Hormozgan Province ===
- Saidabad, Hormozgan, a village in Bandar Abbas County

=== Isfahan Province ===
- Saidabad, Golpayegan, a village in Golpayegan County
- Saidabad, Lenjan, a village in Lenjan County
- Saidabad, Shahin Shahr and Meymeh, a village in Shahin Shahr and Meymeh County

=== Kerman Province ===
- Saidabad, former name of Sirjan, a city in Kerman Province, Iran
- Saidabad, Anbarabad, a village in Anbarabad County
- Saidabad-e Olya, Kerman, a village in Anbarabad County
- Saidabad-e Sofla, Kerman, a village in Anbarabad County
- Saidabad, Bam, a village in Bam County
- Saidabad, Kahnuj, a village in Kahnuj County
- Saidabad, Kerman, a village in Kerman County
- Saidabad, Chatrud, a village in Kerman County
- Saidabad, Derakhtengan, a village in Kerman County
- Saidabad, Golbaf, a village in Kerman County
- Saidabad, Razmavaran, a village in Rafsanjan County
- Saidabad-e Shafipur, a village in Rafsanjan County
- Saidabad, Rigan, a village in Rigan County
- Saidabad, Rudbar-e Jonubi, a village in Rudbar-e Jonubi County

=== Kurdistan Province ===
- Saidabad, Kurdistan, a village in Dehgolan County

=== Markazi Province ===
- Saidabad, Markazi, a village in Markazi Province, Iran
- Sayidabad, Markazi, a village in Markazi Province, Iran

=== Mazandaran Province ===
- Saidabad, Sari, a village in Sari County
- Saidabad, Chahardangeh, a village in Sari County
- Saidabad, alternate name of Aqeh Kheyl, a village in Sari County

=== Qazvin Province ===
- Saidabad, Avaj, a village in Qazvin Province, Iran
- Saidabad, Dashtabi, a village in Qazvin Province, Iran
- Saidabad, Takestan, a village in Qazvin Province, Iran

=== Qom Province ===
- Saidabad, alternate name of Sadabad, Qom Province, Iran

=== Razavi Khorasan Province ===
- Saidabad, Razavi Khorasan, a village in Mashhad County, Razavi Khorasan Province, Iran
- Saiyidabad, alternate name of Seyyedabad, Chenaran, Razavi Khorasan Province, Iran
- Saidabad, alternate name of Seyyedabad, Khoshab, Razavi Khorasan Province, Iran
- Saidabad, alternate name of Sadabad, Fariman, Razavi Khorasan Province, Iran
- Saiyidabad, alternate name of Sadabad, Rashtkhvar, Razavi Khorasan Province, Iran

=== Semnan Province ===
- Saidabad, alternate name of Sadabad, Shahrud, Semnan Province, Iran

=== Sistan and Baluchestan Province ===
- Saidabad, Bampur, a village in Bampur County
- Saidabad, Hirmand, a village in Hirmand County

=== South Khorasan Province ===
- Saidabad, South Khorasan, a village in Tabas County
- Saiyidabad, alternate name of Seyyedabad, Fakhrud, South Khorasan Province, Iran
- Saiyidabad, alternate name of Seyyedabad, Qohestan, South Khorasan Province, Iran
- Saidabad, alternate name of Kalateh-ye Seyyed Ali, South Khorasan, Iran

=== Tehran Province ===
- Saidabad, Shahriar, a village in Shahriar County
- Saidabad-e Jajrud, a village in Pardis County
- Saidabad Rural District (Pardis County)
- Saidabad Rural District (Shahriar County)
- Saidabad, Pishva, a village in Tehran Province, Iran
- Saidabad, alternate name of Seyyedabad, Damavand, a village in Tehran Province, Iran
- Saidabad, alternate name of Nematabad-e Ghar, Tehran Province, Iran

=== West Azerbaijan Province ===
- Saidabad, Chaldoran, a village in Chaldoran County
- Saidabad, Khoy, a village in Khoy County
- Saidabad, Maku, a village in Maku County
- Saidabad, Shahin Dezh, a village in Shahin Dezh County

=== Yazd Province ===
- Saidabad, Yazd, a village in Taft County

=== Zanjan Province ===
- Saidabad-e Olya, Zanjan, in Ijrud County
- Saidabad-e Sofla, Zanjan, in Ijrud County
- Saidabad Rural District (Zanjan Province), in Ijrud County
- Saidabad, Zanjan, in Khodabandeh County

== See also ==
- Seyyedabad (disambiguation)
