= Meymeh =

City in Isfahan province, Iran

Meymeh Dari: ميمه
- City
- Location within Iran
- Coordinates: 33°26′43″N 51°10′16″E
- Country: Iran
- Province: Isfahan
- County: Meymeh and Vazvan
- District: Central

Population (2016)
  - Total: 5,651
- Time zone: UTC+3:30 (IRST)

Meymeh (Dari: ميمه) (Note: Also romanized as Meimeh) is a city in the Central District (Note: Formerly Meymeh District of Shahinshahr County) of Meymeh and Vazvan County, Isfahan province, Iran, serving as capital of the county. It is in the vicinity of the arterial road of Tehran-Isfahan.

== History ==
=== Ancient history ===
Meymeh's significance has largely derived from its position on the route between Isfahan and Tehran. The town converted from Zoroastrianism to Islam in four waves, one between 695 AD and 700 AD, one between 735 AD to 740 AD, one between 945 AD and 960 AD, and one between 1520 AD and 1530 AD. The earliest evidence of the trade routes passing through Meymeh is the presence of two Seljuk-era rebats in the area. One is in Meymeh itself, near a later Mongol-era mosque. The other, now known as Rebat-e Tork, lies further north on the road to Delijan. Originally built as a military outpost, Rebat-e Tork was later converted into a caravanserai.

Textual sources from this time make no mention of Meymeh, but they do appear to mention the nearby town of Vazvan. The 10th-century writer Ibn Khordadbeh described "Rebāṭ-e Vazz" as the station after Borkhvar on the road from Isfahan to Ray (then the main city in the Tehran area). The name "Vazz" is an apparent reference to Vazvan, indicating that it was originally the main town in the area. Meymeh itself is first mentioned by Yaqut al-Hamawi, several centuries later, who describes Meymeh as a wilayat of Isfahan.

However, Hamdallah Mustawfi, the main authority on Iranian geography in the following 14th century, makes no mention of Meymeh. By the Safavid era, the main trade route from Isfahan to Tehran had shifted away from Meymeh, now passing through the towns of Natanz, Qohrud, and Kashan in the Kargas mountains. This remained the preferred route through the time of the Qajar dynasty. Meymeh's modern importance came after the automobile gained popularity in Iran, replacing the camel caravans of earlier times. The arrival of the automobile caused the preferred route to shift from the mountains to the plains of Meymeh and Delijan.

=== Meymeh in the 1930s ===
The ethnographic writings of Ann Lambton, in 1936–37, provide a snapshot of life in Meymeh and Jowsheqan during the 1930s, when traditional small-town life was just beginning to be affected by the sweeping reforms of Reza Shah Pahlavi. Most people in Meymeh were peasants who owned their own land. The town's agricultural area was divided into 2,016 habbas, with the average holding being 2-5 habbas, although there was one large landowner who owned a large portion of the habbas, along with several thousand sheep and goats. Meymeh also had a carpenter, a blacksmith, a potter, a builder, a brickmaker, a couple of shopkeepers, and two sellers of clothing. There were two public baths and two mosques.

Also at this time, Meymeh was the seat of the deputy governor of the district of Meymeh and Jowsheqan. The deputy governor's main responsibility was to preside over the solhiya court that met in Meymeh and was mostly concerned with financial disputes. Traditional education by the mullahs had already been abolished and replaced with secular, state-run schools. Meymeh and Jowsheqan each had a school, and the two of them together were overseen by a raʾis-e maʿāref, or "head of [the department of] education". Each town also had a kadkhoda, or "head of the village", appointed by the governor of Kashan based on the recommendations of the locals. The kadkhoda's responsibilities were mainly concerned with agriculture, especially cleaning the qanats. By this time, however, use of the qanats in Meymeh had declined—of its ten qanats in Meymeh, only two (the Bir and the Mordabad) were still in use. The kadkhoda had three subordinates, or pakars, and there was also a mirab in charge of water distribution.

Despite the decline of the qanats, Meymeh remained a prosperous town. There was little to no emigration to the growing metropolis of Tehran, especially in contrast to neighboring districts. Meymeh enjoyed a fairly constant water supply and good farmland. It also had vineyards. Surplus crops were stored in an old fort in the town. An important tradition connecting Meymeh with Kashan was the festival of Esbandi, which Lambton observed during her time here, although celebration of Esbandi declined dramatically in the following decades and was moribund by the end of the 1960s.

=== Administrative history ===
During the late Qajar period, Meymeh was part of the district of Jowsheqan. Under the Pahlavi dynasty, in 1921–22, Meymeh was put in Jowsheqan boluk of Kashan County. By 1950, the boluk had been made a dehestan (rural district), and by 1954 it was raised to a bakhsh (district), and named Meymeh. Then, in 1957, Meymeh District was transferred from Kashan to Isfahan County, upsetting the residents of Jowsheqan, who had traditionally identified with Kashan more. Thus, the district was split in two, with Meymeh going into Isfahan and Jowsheqan into Kashan.

In 1990, the county of Borkhar and Meymeh was formed by merging those two districts. The capital of the new county was the new city of Shahinshahr. Under this new arrangement, Meymeh remained a district with two rural districts, Vandadeh and Zarkan. In 2024, Meymeh District (Note: Renamed the Central District of Meymeh and Vazvan County) was separated from the county in the establishment of Meymeh and Vazvan County and renamed the Central District, with Meymeh as the new county's capital.

Despite all these changes, the borders of the city of Meymeh itself have remained essentially unchanged since at least the original Pahlavi arrangement.

== Demographics ==
=== Population ===
At the time of the 2006 National Census, the city's population was 5,733 in 1,790 households, when it was capital of Meymeh District in Borkhar and Meymeh County. The following census in 2011 counted 5,449 people in 1,732 households, by which time the district had been separated from the county in the establishment of Shahin Shahr and Meymeh County. (Note: Renamed Shahinshahr County) The 2016 census measured the population of the city as 5,651 people in 1,909 households.

== Geography ==
=== Location ===
Meymeh is located on a high plain in the western foothills of the Kargas mountains, which separate Meymeh from Natanz to the east. To the west lies a wasteland, at the other end of which is Khvansar County.

Clustered around Meymeh are the town of Vazvan and the villages of Ziadabad, Azan, Vandadeh, and Khosrowabad. To the northeast is Chaqadeh. To the northwest, the outlying village of Muteh stands isolated on a rural road leading to Golpayegan.

=== Climate ===
Meymeh has a cold semi-arid climate (Köpper Bsk) with an average temperature of 13.6 °C.

Climate data for Meymeh (1999-2010 normals)
Month	Jan	Feb	Mar	Apr	May	Jun	Jul	Aug	Sep	Oct	Nov	Dec	Year
Daily mean °C (°F)	−0.5 (31.1)	2.1 (35.8)	6.3 (43.3)	11.8 (53.2)	16.3 (61.3)	21.8 (71.2)	24.9 (76.8)	23.8 (74.8)	19.8 (67.6)	13.6 (56.5)	6.0 (42.8)	2.3 (36.1)	12.4 (54.2)
Average precipitation mm (inches)	25.8 (1.02)	9.5 (0.37)	21.2 (0.83)	34.5 (1.36)	11.9 (0.47)	3.4 (0.13)	2.1 (0.08)	1.7 (0.07)	0.0 (0.0)	2.8 (0.11)	17.6 (0.69)	33.2 (1.31)	163.7 (6.44)
Average snowy days	3.6	2.6	1.0	0	0	0	0	0	0	0	0.3	1.9	9.4
Average relative humidity (%)	64	51	40	39	28	20	22	20	20	30	50	62	37
Average dew point °C (°F)	−7.0 (19.4)	−8.1 (17.4)	−7.6 (18.3)	−2.7 (27.1)	−3.1 (26.4)	−1.7 (28.9)	1.9 (35.4)	−0.4 (31.3)	−3.5 (25.7)	−4.0 (24.8)	−4.7 (23.5)	−4.7 (23.5)	−3.8 (25.1)
Source: IRIMO(dew point 1999-2005)

== Economy ==
=== Agriculture ===
The economy of Meymeh is primarily rural and agricultural. Irrigation comes from a seasonal river as well as from qanats, although the use of qanats had declined by the 1930s. Major crops at this time included cereals, beans, cotton, fruits, and vegetables. Cultivation of opium was forbidden in 1937. Surplus crops were stored in an old fort. A unique feature of the Meymeh region is the presence of bumkands, which are manmade caverns used to shelter livestock during the harshest part of winter.

Meymeh has historically been known for its dried fruit, sold in Isfahan and Kashan. They are either sold plain or in jowzeqand form, where the dried fruit skin is stuffed with sugar.

=== Service industry ===
Modern Meymeh also derives economic significance from its position on the Tehran-Isfahan highway. Much of modern Meymeh's service economy is dedicated to stores and restaurants along the main highway.
