= Lushab =

Village in Isfahan province, Iran

Lushab Persian: لوشاب
- Village
- Location within Iran
- Coordinates: 33°26′06″N 50°46′02″E
- Country: Iran
- Province: Isfahan
- County: Meymeh and Vazvan
- District: Laybid
- Rural District: Zarkan

Population (2016)
  - Total: 305
- Time zone: UTC+3:30 (IRST)

Lushab (Persian: لوشاب) (Note: Also romanized as Lūshāb) is a village in Zarkan Rural District of Laybid District in Meymeh and Vazvan County, Isfahan province, Iran.

== Demographics ==
=== Population ===
At the time of the 2006 National Census, the village's population was 342 in 113 households, when it was in Meymeh District (Note: Renamed the Central District of Meymeh and Vazvan County) of Borkhar and Meymeh County. The following census in 2011 counted 239 people in 96 households, by which time the district had been separated from the county in the establishment of Shahin Shahr and Meymeh County. (Note: Renamed Shahinshahr County) The 2016 census measured the population of the village as 305 people in 115 households.

In 2024, the district was separated from the county in the establishment of Meymeh and Vazvan County and renamed the Central District. The rural district was transferred to the new Laybid District.
