= Muteh =

Village in Isfahan province, Iran

Muteh Persian: موته
- Village
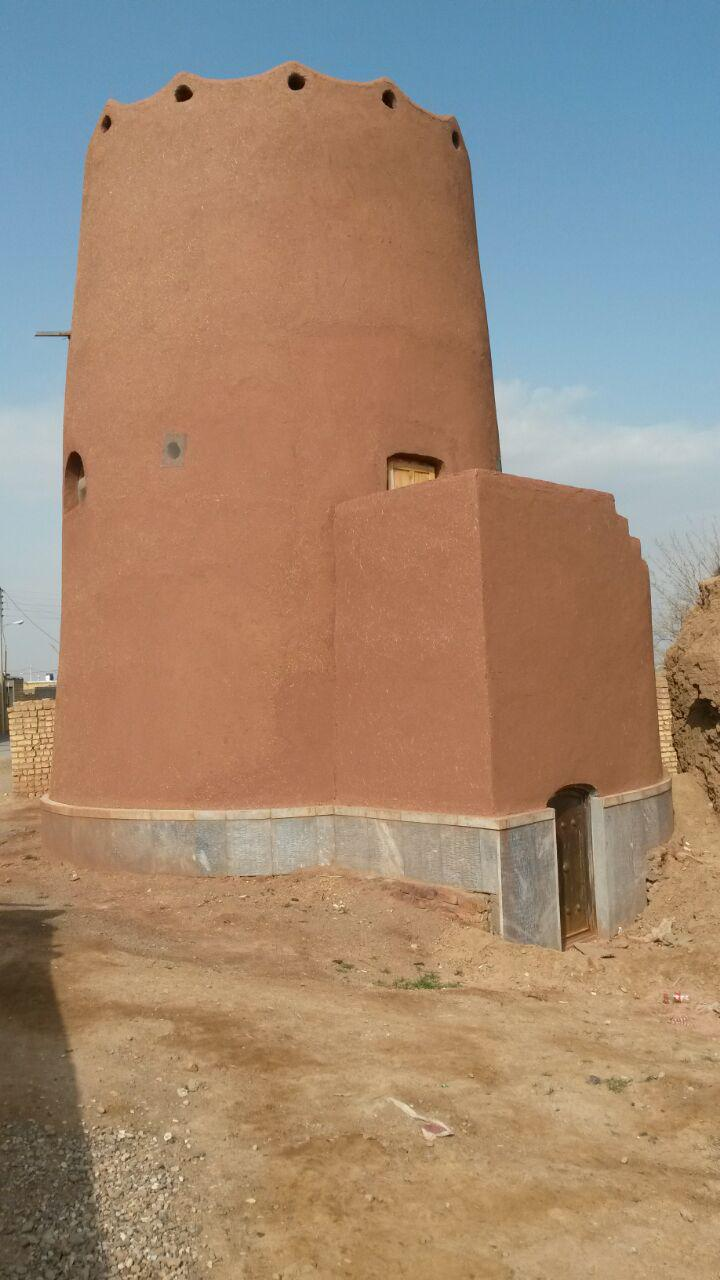
- Muteh tower

- Location within Iran
- Coordinates: 33°37′26″N 50°47′13″E
- Country: Iran
- Province: Isfahan
- County: Meymeh and Vazvan
- District: Laybid
- Rural District: Muteh

Population (2016)
  - Total: 898
- Time zone: UTC+3:30 (IRST)

Muteh (Persian: موته) (Note: Also romanized as Mūteh; also known as Nūteh) is a village in, and the capital of, Muteh Rural District in Laybid District of Meymeh and Vazvan County, Isfahan province, Iran.

== Demographics ==
=== Population ===
At the time of the 2006 National Census, the village's population was 908 in 242 households, when it was in Zarkan Rural District of Meymeh District (Note: Renamed the Central District of Meymeh and Vazvan County) in Borkhar and Meymeh County. The following census in 2011 counted 827 people in 249 households, by which time the district had been separated from the county in the establishment of Shahin Shahr and Meymeh County. (Note: Renamed Shahinshahr County) The 2016 census measured the population of the village as 898 people in 289 households.

In 2024, the district was separated from the county in the establishment of Meymeh and Vazvan County and renamed the Central District. The rural district was transferred to the new Laybid District, and Muteh was transferred to Muteh Rural District created in the same district.
