= Kalateh-ye Seyyed Ali =

Kalateh-ye Seyyed Ali (Persian: كلاته سيدعلي) may refer to:

- Kalateh-ye Seyyed Ali, Gonabad, Razavi Khorasan Province
- Kalateh-ye Seyyed Ali, Mashhad, Razavi Khorasan Province
- Kalateh-ye Seyyed Ali, South Khorasan
