= Hasan Robat-e Pain =

Village in Isfahan province, Iran

Hasan Robat-e Pain Persian: حسن رباط پائين
- Village
- Location within Iran
- Coordinates: 33°24′27″N 50°48′40″E
- Country: Iran
- Province: Isfahan
- County: Meymeh and Vazvan
- District: Laybid
- Rural District: Zarkan

Population (2016)
  - Total: 1,700
- Time zone: UTC+3:30 (IRST)

Hasan Robat-e Pain (Persian: حسن رباط پائين) (Note: Also romanized as Ḩasan Robāţ-e Pā’īn; also known as Ḩasanrobāţ) is a village in, and the capital of, Zarkan Rural District in Laybid District of Meymeh and Vazvan County, Isfahan province, Iran.

== Demographics ==
=== Population ===
At the time of the 2006 National Census, the village's population was 1,762 in 362 households, when it was in Meymeh District (Note: Renamed the Central District of Meymeh and Vazvan County) of Borkhar and Meymeh County. The following census in 2011 counted 1,682 people in 527 households, by which time the district had been separated from the county in the establishment of Shahin Shahr and Meymeh County. (Note: Renamed Shahinshahr County) The 2016 census measured the population of the village as 1,700 people in 563 households. It was the most populous village in its rural district.

In 2024, the district was separated from the county in the establishment of Meymeh and Vazvan County and renamed the Central District. The rural district was transferred to the new Laybid District.
