= Qanbar (disambiguation) =

Qanbar (Persian: قنبر) or its variants may refer to:

== Iran ==
=== Ardabil province ===
- Qanbarabad, South Khorasan, a village in Germi County

=== Chaharmahal and Bakhtiari province ===
- Qanbar Sini, a village in Kuhrang County

=== Fars province ===
- Qanbari, Fars, a village in Sarvestan County

=== Gilan province ===
- Qanbar Mahalleh, Astara, a village in Astara County
- Qanbar Mahalleh, Talesh, a village in Talesh County

=== Kermanshah province ===
- Khub Yaran-e Sofla, a village also known as Qanbar in Kermanshah County

=== Lorestan province ===
- Qanbar Ali-ye Olya, a village in Selseleh County

=== North Khorasan province ===
- Qanbar Baghi, a village in Bam and Safiabad County

=== Qazvin province ===
- Qanbarabad, Qazvin, a village in Takestan County

=== South Khorasan province ===
- Qanbarabad, South Khorasan, a village in Tabas County

== Iraq ==
- Qanbar Ali, Baghdad, an old neighborhood in al-Rusafa
