= Chakab =

Chakab or Chekab (Persian: چكاب) may refer to:

- Chakab, Razavi Khorasan
- Chekab, South Khorasan
