= Deh-e Shadi =

Deh-e Shadi (Persian: ده شادي) may refer to:

- Deh-e Shadi, Sistan and Baluchestan
- Deh-e Shadi, Hirmand, Sistan and Baluchestan Province
- Deh-e Shadi, South Khorasan
