= Maravand =

Village in Isfahan province, Iran

Maravand Persian: مراوند
- Village
- Location within Iran
- Coordinates: 33°32′22″N 51°26′19″E
- Country: Iran
- Province: Isfahan
- County: Meymeh and Vazvan
- District: Central
- Rural District: Vandadeh

Population (2016)
  - Total: 14
- Time zone: UTC+3:30 (IRST)

Maravand (Persian: مراوند) (Note: Also romanized as Marāvand; also known as Marvand) is a village in Vandadeh Rural District of the Central District (Note: Formerly Meymeh District of Shahinshahr County) in Meymeh and Vazvan County, Isfahan province, Iran.

== Demographics ==
=== Population ===
At the time of the 2006 National Census, the village's population was 16 in 10 households, when it was in Meymeh District (Note: Renamed the Central District of Meymeh and Vazvan County) of Borkhar and Meymeh County. The following census in 2011 counted 11 people in six households, by which time the district had been separated from the county in the establishment of Shahin Shahr and Meymeh County. (Note: Renamed Shahinshahr County) The 2016 census measured the population of the village as 14 people in six households.

In 2024, the district was separated from the county in the establishment of Meymeh and Vazvan County and renamed the Central District.
