= Ziadabad, Isfahan =

Village in Isfahan province, Iran

Ziadabad Persian: زياداباد
- Village
- Location within Iran
- Coordinates: 33°26′04″N 51°09′22″E
- Country: Iran
- Province: Isfahan
- County: Meymeh and Vazvan
- District: Central
- Rural District: Azan

Population (2016)
  - Total: 1,826
- Time zone: UTC+3:30 (IRST)

Ziadabad (Persian: زياداباد) (Note: Also romanized as Zeyādābād and Zīādābād) is a village in Azan Rural District of the Central District (Note: Formerly Meymeh District of Shahinshahr County) in Meymeh and Vazvan County, Isfahan province, Iran.

== Demographics ==
=== Population ===
At the time of the 2006 National Census, the village's population was 1,487 in 442 households, when it was in Vandadeh Rural District of Meymeh District (Note: Renamed the Central District of Meymeh and Vazvan County) in Borkhar and Meymeh County. The following census in 2011 counted 1,739 people in 516 households, by which time the district had been separated from the county in the establishment of Shahin Shahr and Meymeh County. (Note: Renamed Shahinshahr County) The 2016 census measured the population of the village as 1,826 people in 578 households.

In 2024, the district was separated from the county in the establishment of Meymeh and Vazvan County and renamed the Central District. Ziadabad was transferred to Azan Rural District created in the same district.
