= Valu Kash =

Valu Kash ولوكش
- Village
- Location within Iran
- Coordinates: 36°13′45″N 52°59′00″E
- Country: Iran
- Province: Mazandaran
- County: Savadkuh
- Bakhsh: Zirab
- Rural District: Kaseliyan

Population (2016)
  - Total: 99
- Time zone: UTC+3:30 (IRST)

Valu Kash (Persian: ولوكش, also Romanized as Valū Kash) is a village in Kaseliyan Rural District, in Zirab District of Savadkuh County, Mazandaran Province, Iran. At the 2006 census, its population was 103, in 27 families. In 2016, its population was 99, in 34 households.
