= Pir Naim =

Pir Naim پيرنعيم
- Village
- Location within Iran
- Coordinates: 36°13′24″N 53°01′54″E
- Country: Iran
- Province: Mazandaran
- County: Savadkuh
- Bakhsh: Zirab
- Rural District: Kaseliyan

Population (2016)
  - Total: 181
- Time zone: UTC+3:30 (IRST)

Pir Naim (Persian: پيرنعيم, also Romanized as Pīr Na‘īm; also known as Per Na‘īm) is a village in Kaseliyan Rural District, in Zirab District of Savadkuh County, Mazandaran Province, Iran. At the 2006 census, its population was 251, in 64 families. In 2016, its population was 181 in 71 households.
