= Sukhteh Sara =

Sukhteh Sara سوخته سرا
- Village
- Location within Iran
- Coordinates: 36°17′27″N 53°00′47″E
- Country: Iran
- Province: Mazandaran
- County: Savadkuh
- Bakhsh: Zirab
- Rural District: Kaseliyan

Population (2016)
  - Total: 109
- Time zone: UTC+3:30 (IRST)

Sukhteh Sara (Persian: سوخته سرا, also Romanized as Sūkhteh Sarā) is a village in Kaseliyan Rural District, in Zirab District of Savadkuh County, Mazandaran Province, Iran. At the 2016 census, its population was 109, in 40 families. Up from 96 in 2006.
