= Razmgah Kammando of Iran =

The Razmgah Kammando of Iran (Persian: رزمگاه کماندو ایران), also known as Razmgah-e Kommando-ye Iran, emerged as a significant entity in Iran's sport-cultural sphere. Founded by Abdolhamid Bagherian Jamnani in February 1984, its establishment marked a notable development in the country's sporting landscape. Beginning its formal registration process in 1989, Razmgah attained official recognition from the Ministry of Sport and Youth (Iran) on August 16, 1997. This distinction as the pioneering Iranian institution blending cultural and martial arts pursuits underscores its pivotal role in shaping the nation's athletic ethos.

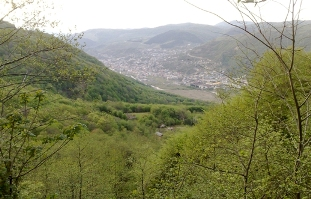
Campus of the Razmgah Kammando of Iran.

The term Kammando (English: Commando) has been elucidated by the founder of Razmgah in an interview with Radio Tehran as possessing Persian etymology. According to this interpretation, Kammando comprises Kamman (English: Arc) and Do (English: Two), connoting two upper and lower arcs symbolizing the holistic nature of human existence, encompassing both physical and spiritual dimensions.

== Establishment and Early History (1993-2007) ==
The Persian term Razmgah (English: Battlefield) denotes a sport-culture complex inaugurated in 1993 within the scenic expanse of the Alborz forest mountain range in Zirab, Savadkuh County . Despite fervent advocacy within the Islamic Consultative Assembly for the allocation of funds towards its construction, bureaucratic delays initially impeded progress. Nevertheless, after a protracted period spanning 14 years, Razmgah materialized into a fully-fledged sports training campus, featuring five villa buildings alongside essential infrastructure and sanitation amenities.

During the years 2005 to 2007, the organization experienced a period of notable growth and development under the auspices of the Islamic Republic of Iran. This phase coincided with the construction of two additional buildings, namely Mahan and Tabarestan, which further expanded the facilities of the campus. Sporting and cultural activities held on-site attracted participation from youth representing fourteen provinces across Iran. Concurrently, efforts spearheaded by Yekita aimed at promoting Razmgah and securing government-funded support unfortunately met with limited success.

== Encounters with Official Entities ==
On December 5, 2008, officials from the Ministry of Intelligence apprehended Bagherian and the director of Razmgah while en route to the campus. Over the subsequent week, several Razmgah employees were also detained and held in solitary confinement at a Ministry of Intelligence detention facility in Sari, Iran. While most detainees were released on bail within three months, Bagherian and his companion remained in custody until September 2009. Subsequently, the Islamic Revolutionary Guard Corps characterized Razmgah Kammando of Iran as a hub of malign influence promoting aberrant ideologies.

== Razmgah Campus Raid of 2012 ==
On November 3, 2012, a contingent of the Armed Forces of the Islamic Republic of Iran, supported by Ministry of Intelligence operatives and accompanied by an Islamic cleric (referred to as akhoond or Mullah), embarked on a mission to the campus located in Savadkuh County. Employing heavy machinery, they cleared a path through the forest by cutting through seedlings and trees. Upon reaching the campus, the armed forces apprehended several Razmgah employees who were residing in the Mahan building, utilized as both a Hussainiya (a Shia gathering place) and an educational and reconciliation center. Subsequently, the armed forces proceeded to demolish the Mahan building, as well as sanitary facilities and the Alachiq Building assembly hall situated on the southern part of the campus. Concurrently, a squad of armed forces conducted an assault on the central office of Razmgah in Tehran on the same day.

== 2015 Incident ==
In February 2015, Razmgah's campus underwent a notable incident involving the armed forces. During this period, the remaining structures on the campus were demolished, and the facilities were set on fire. Subsequently, the prosecutor's attorney of Savadkuh issued arrest warrants for members of Razmgah, including those who had been detained in December 2008. These occurrences prompted allegations of human rights violations within the Islamic Republic of Iran, as documented in the monthly journal Bashariyat published in Germany.

== Literary and Scholarly Contributions ==
Razmgah has authored three books: Serenity Within, Voice of Passion and Love, and, The Lost Story of Martial Arts, The last one stands out as a compilation of articles focusing on historical evidence pertaining to Persian martial arts. Yekita has contributed to research in mathematics and science, receiving acknowledgment in published papers for providing ideas, review and support.
