= Deh-e Shadi, South Khorasan =

Deh-e Shadi ده شادي
- Village
- Location within Iran
- Coordinates: 33°00′37″N 57°40′46″E
- Country: Iran
- Province: South Khorasan
- County: Tabas
- Bakhsh: Deyhuk
- Rural District: Kavir

Population (2006)
  - Total: 46
- Time zone: UTC+3:30 (IRST)
  - Summer (DST): UTC+4:30 (IRDT)

Deh-e Shadi (Persian: ده شادي, also Romanized as Deh-e Shādī) is a village in Kavir Rural District, Deyhuk District, Tabas County, South Khorasan Province, Iran. At the 2006 census, its population was 46, in 12 families.
