= Atu, Iran =

Village in Mazandaran province, Iran

Atu Persian: اتو
- Village
- Location within Iran
- Coordinates: 36°13′46″N 53°01′04″E
- Country: Iran
- Province: Mazandaran
- County: Savadkuh
- District: Zirab
- Rural District: Kaseliyan

Population (2016)
  - Total: 510
- Time zone: UTC+3:30 (IRST)

Atu (Persian: اتو) (Note: Also romanized as Atū and Otū) is a village in, and the capital of, Kaseliyan Rural District in Zirab District of Savadkuh County, Mazandaran province, Iran.

== Demographics ==
=== Population ===
At the time of the 2006 National Census, the village's population was 565 in 133 households, when it was in the Central District. The following census in 2011 counted 351 people in 129 households. The 2016 census measured the population of the village as 510 people in 185 households, by which time the rural district had been separated from the district in the formation of Zirab District.
