= Esfahak =

Village in South Khorasan province, Iran

Esfahak Persian: اصفهك
- Village
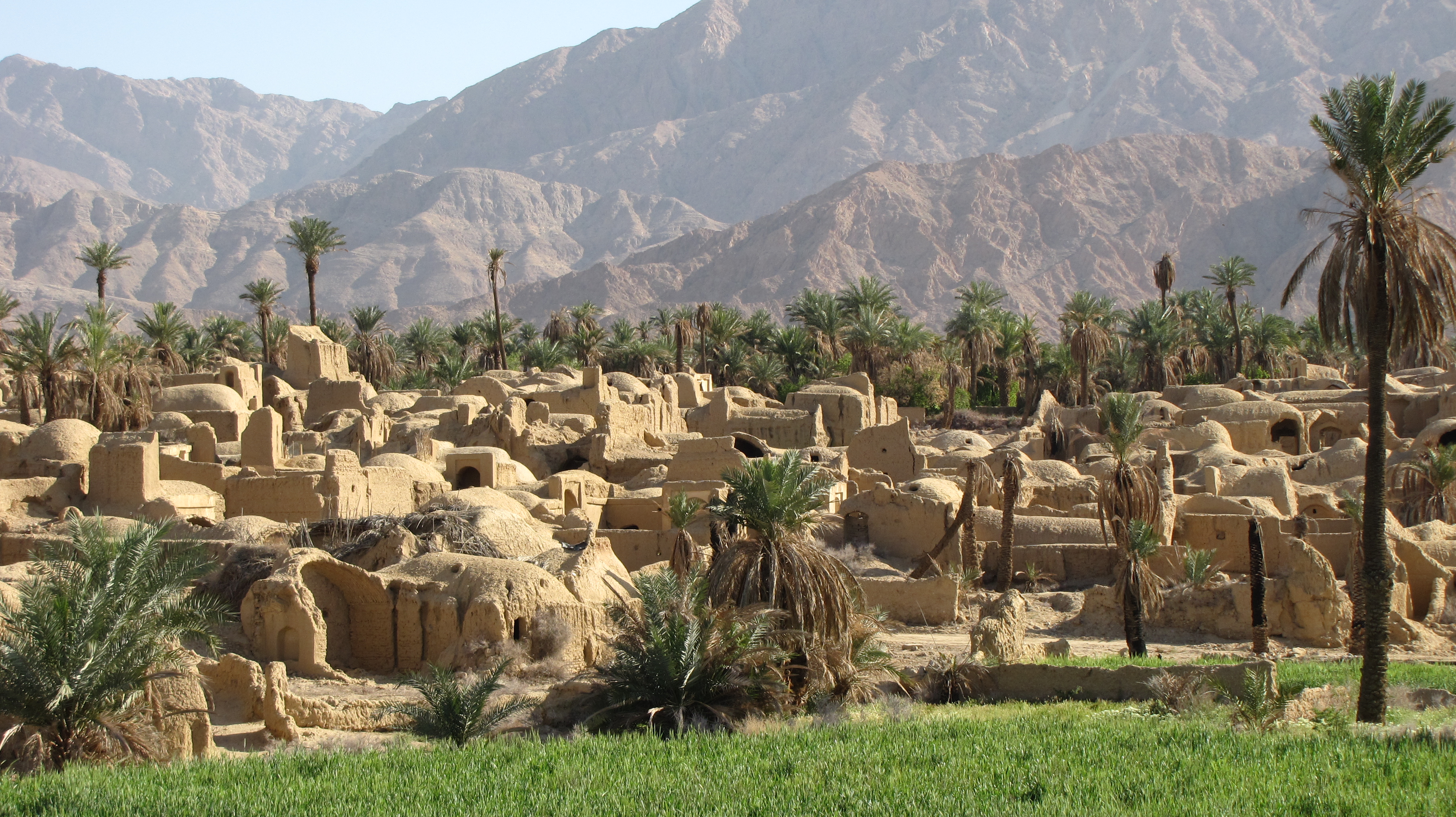
- The village of Esfahak

- Location within Iran
- Coordinates: 33°23′18″N 57°11′31″E
- Country: Iran
- Province: South Khorasan
- County: Tabas
- District: Deyhuk
- Rural District: Deyhuk

Population (2016)
  - Total: 763
- Time zone: UTC+3:30 (IRST)

Esfahak (Persian: اصفهك) (Note: Also romanized as Eşfahak; also known as Aspāk) is a village in Deyhuk Rural District of Deyhuk District in Tabas County, South Khorasan province, Iran.

== Demographics ==
=== Population ===
At the time of the 2006 National Census, the village's population was 726 in 192 households, when it was in Yazd province. The following census in 2011 counted 754 people in 226 households. The 2016 census measured the population of the village as 763 people in 248 households, by which time the county had been separated from the province to join South Khorasan province. Esfahak was the most populous village in its rural district.
