= Muteh Rural District =

Rural district in Isfahan province, Iran

Muteh Rural District Persian: دهستان موته
- Rural District
- Location within Iran
- Coordinates: 33°37′26″N 50°47′13″E
- Country: Iran
- Province: Isfahan
- County: Meymeh and Vazvan
- District: Laybid
- Established: 2024
- Capital: Muteh
- Time zone: UTC+3:30 (IRST)

Muteh Rural District (Persian: دهستان موته) is in Laybid District of Meymeh and Vazvan County, Isfahan province, Iran. Its capital is the village of Muteh, whose population at the time of the 2016 National Census was 898 people in 289 households.

== History ==
In 2007, Borkhar and Meymeh County was divided into Borkhar County and Shahinshahr and Meymeh County, (Note: Renamed Shahinshahr County) the latter of which was divided into two districts of two rural districts each.

In 2024, Meymeh District (Note: Renamed the Central District of Meymeh and Vazvan County) was separated from the county in the establishment of Meymeh and Vazvan County, and Muteh Rural District was created in the new Laybid District.
