= Kanij Kola =

Village in Mazandaran province, Iran

Kanij Kola Persian: كنيج كلا
- Village
- Location within Iran
- Coordinates: 36°09′52″N 52°58′29″E
- Country: Iran
- Province: Mazandaran
- County: Savadkuh
- District: Zirab
- Rural District: Sorkhkola

Population (2016)
  - Total: 92
- Time zone: UTC+3:30 (IRST)

Kanij Kola (Persian: كنيج كلا) (Note: Also romanized as Kanīj Kalā and Kanīj Kolā) is a village in Sorkhkola Rural District of Zirab District in Savadkuh County, Mazandaran province, Iran.

== Demographics ==
=== Population ===
At the time of the 2006 National Census, the village's population was 86 in 26 households, when it was in the Central District. The following census in 2011 counted 48 people in 19 households. The 2016 census measured the population of the village as 92 people in 31 households, by which time the rural district had been separated from the district in the formation of Zirab District.
