= Valila =

Valila or Välilä may refer to:

- Valila, Estonia
- Valila, Iran
- Flavius Valila Theodosius, a Roman-Goth senator and general of the fifth century AD
- Mika Välilä (born 1970), retired Swedish professional ice hockey player
