= Lowlak-e Kaseliyan =

Village in Mazandaran province, Iran

Lowlak-e Kaseliyan Persian: لولاک كسليان
- Village
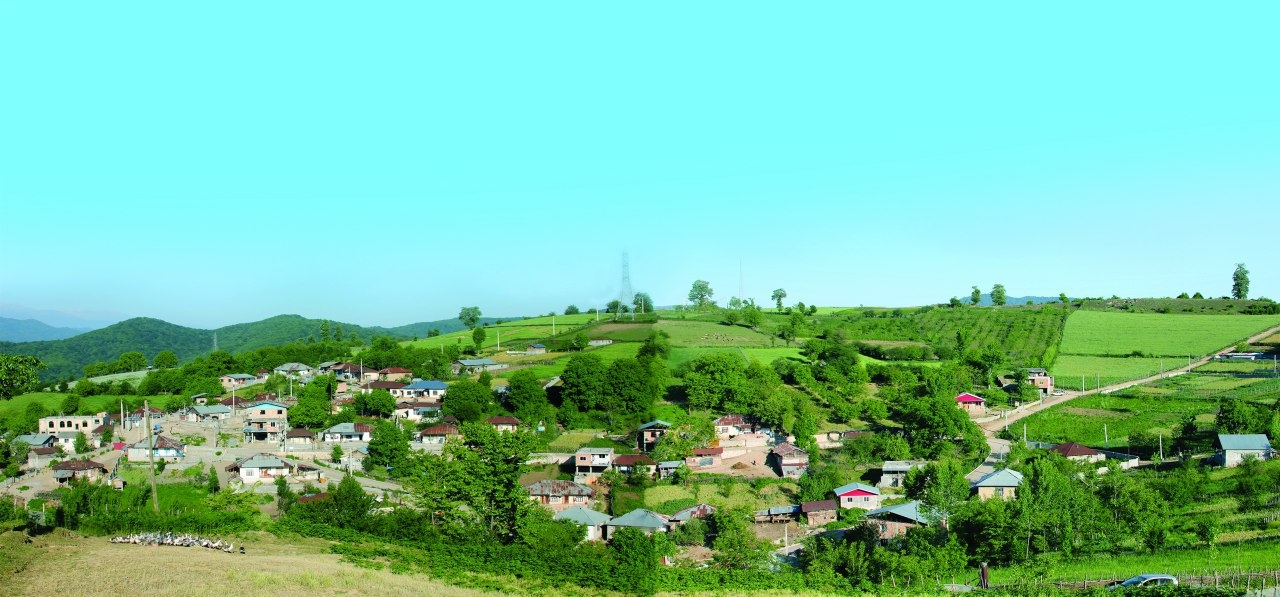
- The village of Lowlak-e Kaseliyan

- Location within Iran
- Coordinates: 36°11′57″N 53°02′07″E
- Country: Iran
- Province: Mazandaran
- County: Savadkuh
- District: Zirab
- Rural District: Kaseliyan

Population (2016)
  - Total: 295
- Time zone: UTC+3:30 (IRST)

Lowlak-e Kaseliyan (Persian: لولاک كسليان) (Note: Also romanized as Lowlāk-e Kaselīyān, Lowlak-e Kaslian, Lowlāk-e Kaslīān, Lūlak-e Keseleyān, and Lūlak-e Keselīān) is a village in Kaseliyan Rural District of Zirab District in Savadkuh County, Mazandaran province, Iran.

== Demographics ==
=== Population ===
At the time of the 2006 National Census, the village's population was 211 in 43 households, when it was in the Central District. The following census in 2011 counted 284 people in 80 households. The 2016 census measured the population of the village as 295 people in 100 households, by which time the rural district had been separated from the district in the formation of Zirab District.
