= Javarem =

Village in Mazandaran province, Iran

Javarem Persian: جوارم
- Village
- Location within Iran
- Coordinates: 36°13′44″N 52°54′30″E
- Country: Iran
- Province: Mazandaran
- County: Savadkuh
- District: Zirab
- Rural District: Sorkhkola

Population (2016)
  - Total: 119
- Time zone: UTC+3:30 (IRST)

Javarem (Persian: جوارم) (Note: Also romanized as Javārem; also known as Jowvārem) is a village in Sorkhkola Rural District of Zirab District in Savadkuh County, Mazandaran province, Iran.

== Demographics ==
=== Population ===
At the time of the 2006 National Census, the village's population was 42 in nine households, when it was in the Central District. The following census in 2011 counted 31 people in 10 households. The 2016 census measured the population of the village as 119 people in 38 households, by which time the rural district had been separated from the district in the formation of Zirab District.
