= Zardgah =

Village in South Khorasan province, Iran

Zardgah Persian: زردگاه
- Village
- Location within Iran
- Coordinates: 32°23′28″N 57°28′47″E
- Country: Iran
- Province: South Khorasan
- County: Tabas
- District: Deyhuk
- Rural District: Kavir

Population (2016)
  - Total: 77
- Time zone: UTC+3:30 (IRST)

Zardgah (Persian: زردگاه) (Note: Also romanized as Zardgāh; also known as Zīāratgāh and Zīyāratgāh) is a village in Kavir Rural District of Deyhuk District in Tabas County, South Khorasan province, Iran.

== Demographics ==
=== Population ===
At the time of the 2006 National Census, the village's population was 59 in 17 households, when it was in Yazd province. The following census in 2011 counted 88 people in 30 households. The 2016 census measured the population of the village as 77 people in 25 households, by which time the county had been separated from the province to join South Khorasan province.
