= Mateh Kola, Savadkuh =

Village in Mazandaran province, Iran

Mateh Kola Persian: مته كلا
- Village
- Location within Iran
- Coordinates: 36°11′44″N 53°01′55″E
- Country: Iran
- Province: Mazandaran
- County: Savadkuh
- District: Zirab
- Rural District: Kaseliyan

Population (2016)
  - Total: 434
- Time zone: UTC+3:30 (IRST)

Mateh Kola (Persian: مته كلا) (Note: Also romanized as Mateh Kolā; also known as Mad Kolū and Mad Kūlā) is a village in Kaseliyan Rural District of Zirab District in Savadkuh County, Mazandaran province, Iran.

== Demographics ==
=== Population ===
At the time of the 2006 National Census, the village's population was 291 in 65 households, when it was in the Central District. The following census in 2011 counted 325 people in 96 households. The 2016 census measured the population of the village as 434 people in 134 households, by which time the rural district had been separated from the district in the formation of Zirab District.
