= Esmailabad, Tabas =

Village in South Khorasan province, Iran

Esmailabad Persian: اسماعيل اباد
- Village
- Location within Iran
- Coordinates: 33°04′43″N 57°42′27″E
- Country: Iran
- Province: South Khorasan
- County: Tabas
- District: Deyhuk
- Rural District: Kavir

Population (2016)
  - Total: 214
- Time zone: UTC+3:30 (IRST)

Esmailabad (Persian: اسماعيل اباد) (Note: Also romanized as Esmā‘īlābād and Isma‘īlābād) is a village in Kavir Rural District of Deyhuk District in Tabas County, South Khorasan province, Iran.

== Demographics ==
=== Population ===
At the time of the 2006 National Census, the village's population was 187 in 58 households, when it was in Yazd province. The following census in 2011 counted 257 people in 65 households. The 2016 census measured the population of the village as 214 people in 68 households, by which time the county had been separated from the province to join South Khorasan province.
