= Amirabad, Deyhuk =

Village in South Khorasan province, Iran

Amirabad Persian: اميراباد
- Village
- Location within Iran
- Country: Iran
- Province: South Khorasan
- County: Tabas
- District: Deyhuk
- Rural District: Deyhuk

Population (2016)
  - Total: 81
- Time zone: UTC+3:30 (IRST)

Amirabad (Persian: اميراباد) (Note: Also romanized as Amīrābād) is a village in Deyhuk Rural District of Deyhuk District in Tabas County, South Khorasan province, Iran.

== Demographics ==
=== Population ===
At the time of the 2006 National Census, the village's population was 81 in 24 households, when it was in Yazd province. The following census in 2011 counted 84 people in 27 households. The 2016 census measured the population of the village as 81 people in 33 households, by which time the county had been separated from the province to join South Khorasan province.
