= Kochid =

Village in Mazandaran province, Iran

Kochid Persian: كچيد
- Village
- Location within Iran
- Coordinates: 36°12′19″N 53°00′38″E
- Country: Iran
- Province: Mazandaran
- County: Savadkuh
- District: Zirab
- Rural District: Kaseliyan

Population (2016)
  - Total: 200
- Time zone: UTC+3:30 (IRST)

Kochid (Persian: كچيد) (Note: Also romanized as Kechid, Kechīd, and Kochīd; also known as Kajīd, and Kūchīd) is a village in Kaseliyan Rural District of Zirab District in Savadkuh County, Mazandaran province, Iran.

== Demographics ==
=== Population ===
At the time of the 2006 National Census, the village's population was 114 in 32 households, when it was in the Central District. The following census in 2011 counted 245 people in 71 households. The 2016 census measured the population of the village as 200 people in 74 households, by which time the rural district had been separated from the district in the formation of Zirab District.
