= Pasha Kola, Savadkuh =

Village in Mazandaran province, Iran

Pasha Kola Persian: پاشاكلا
- Village
- Location within Iran
- Coordinates: 36°11′48″N 53°02′24″E
- Country: Iran
- Province: Mazandaran
- County: Savadkuh
- District: Zirab
- Rural District: Kaseliyan

Population (2016)
  - Total: 348
- Time zone: UTC+3:30 (IRST)

Pasha Kola (Persian: پاشاكلا) (Note: Also romanized as Pāshā Kolā) is a village in Kaseliyan Rural District of Zirab District in Savadkuh County, Mazandaran province, Iran.

== Demographics ==
=== Population ===
At the time of the 2006 National Census, the village's population was 462 in 81 households, when it was in the Central District. The following census in 2011 counted 356 people in 95 households. The 2016 census measured the population of the village as 348 people in 114 households, by which time the rural district had been separated from the district in the formation of Zirab District.
