= Vandadeh =

Village in Isfahan province, Iran

Vandadeh Persian: ونداده
- Village
- Location within Iran
- Coordinates: 33°23′08″N 51°12′27″E
- Country: Iran
- Province: Isfahan
- County: Meymeh and Vazvan
- District: Central
- Rural District: Vandadeh

Population (2016)
  - Total: 1,354
- Time zone: UTC+3:30 (IRST)

Vandadeh (Persian: ونداده) (Note: Also romanized as Vandādeh) is a village in, and the capital of, Vandadeh Rural District in the Central District (Note: Formerly Meymeh District of Shahinshahr County) of Meymeh and Vazvan County, Isfahan province, Iran.

== Demographics ==
=== Population ===
At the time of the 2006 National Census, the village's population was 1,226 in 410 households, when it was in Meymeh District (Note: Renamed the Central District of Meymeh and Vazvan County) of Borkhar and Meymeh County. The following census in 2011 counted 1,153 people in 420 households, by which time the district had been separated from the county in the establishment of Shahin Shahr and Meymeh County. (Note: Renamed Shahinshahr County) The 2016 census measured the population of the village as 1,354 people in 472 households.

In 2024, the district was separated from the county in the establishment of Meymeh and Vazvan County and renamed the Central District.
