= Nay Band =

Village in South Khorasan province, Iran

Nay Band Persian: نای بند
- Village
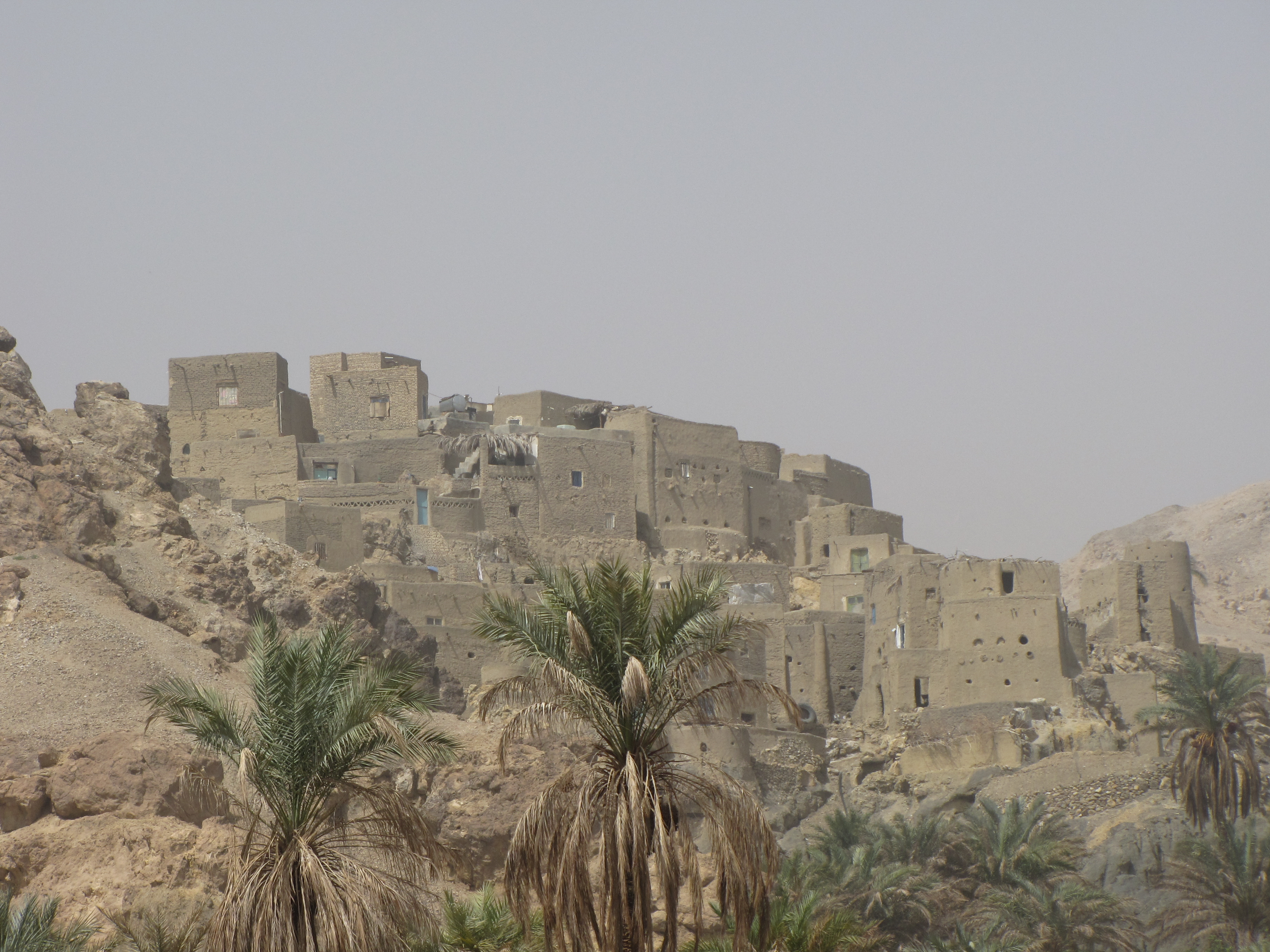
- The village of Nay Band

- Location within Iran
- Coordinates: 32°22′44″N 57°29′43″E
- Country: Iran
- Province: South Khorasan
- County: Tabas
- District: Deyhuk
- Rural District: Kavir

Population (2016)
  - Total: 427
- Time zone: UTC+3:30 (IRST)

Nay Band (Persian: نای بند) (Note: Also romanized as Naiband and Nāy Band; also known as Naibandān, Ney Band, and Neyban) is a village in Kavir Rural District of Deyhuk District in Tabas County, South Khorasan province, Iran.

== Demographics ==
=== Population ===
At the time of the 2006 National Census, the village's population was 484 in 133 households, when it was in Yazd province. The following census in 2011 counted 497 people in 130 households. The 2016 census measured the population of the village as 427 people in 126 households, by which time the county had been separated from the province to join South Khorasan province.
