= Si Pey =

Village in Mazandaran province, Iran

Si Pey Persian: سي پي
- Village
- Location within Iran
- Coordinates: 36°13′01″N 53°01′24″E
- Country: Iran
- Province: Mazandaran
- County: Savadkuh
- District: Zirab
- Rural District: Kaseliyan

Population (2016)
  - Total: 372
- Time zone: UTC+3:30 (IRST)

Si Pey (Persian: سي پي) (Note: Also romanized as Sī Pey) is a village in Kaseliyan Rural District of Zirab District in Savadkuh County, Mazandaran province, Iran.

== Demographics ==
=== Population ===
At the time of the 2006 National Census, the village's population was 295 in 67 households, when it was in the Central District. The following census in 2011 counted 290 people in 100 households. The 2016 census measured the population of the village as 372 people in 143 households, by which time the rural district had been separated from the district in the formation of Zirab District.
