= Sorkhkola Tappeh =

Village in Mazandaran province, Iran

Sorkhkola Tappeh Persian: سرخکلا تپه
- Village
- Location within Iran
- Coordinates: 36°11′41″N 52°56′47″E
- Country: Iran
- Province: Mazandaran
- County: Savadkuh
- District: Zirab
- Rural District: Sorkhkola

Population (2016)
  - Total: 95
- Time zone: UTC+3:30 (IRST)

Sorkhkola Tappeh (Persian: سرخکلا تپه) (Note: Also romanized as Sorkhkolā Tappeh) is a village in, and the capital of, Sorkhkola Rural District in Zirab District of Savadkuh County, Mazandaran province, Iran.

== Demographics ==
=== Population ===
The village did not appear in the 2006 National Census, when it was in the Central District. The following census in 2011 counted 67 people in 24 households. The 2016 census measured the population of the village as 95 people in 35 households, by which time the rural district had been separated from the district in the formation of Zirab District.
