= Peykuh =

Village in South Khorasan province, Iran

Peykuh Persian: پيكوه
- Village
- Location within Iran
- Coordinates: 33°05′13″N 57°22′09″E
- Country: Iran
- Province: South Khorasan
- County: Tabas
- District: Deyhuk
- Rural District: Deyhuk

Population (2016)
  - Total: 428
- Time zone: UTC+3:30 (IRST)

Peykuh (Persian: پيكوه) (Note: Also romanized as Pey Kūh and Peykūh; also known as Pā Kūh, Pa yi Kūh, Pāye Kūh, and Peykū) is a village in Deyhuk Rural District of Deyhuk District in Tabas County, South Khorasan province, Iran.

== Demographics ==
=== Population ===
At the time of the 2006 National Census, the village's population was 361 in 111 households, when it was in Yazd province. The following census in 2011 counted 443 people in 134 households. The 2016 census measured the population of the village as 428 people in 134 households, by which time the county had been separated from the province to join South Khorasan province.
