= Deh Now, Deyhuk =

Village in South Khorasan province, Iran

Deh Now Persian: دهنو
- Village
- Location within Iran
- Coordinates: 33°01′23″N 57°41′00″E
- Country: Iran
- Province: South Khorasan
- County: Tabas
- District: Deyhuk
- Rural District: Kavir

Population (2016)
  - Total: 607
- Time zone: UTC+3:30 (IRST)

Deh Now (Persian: دهنو) (Note: Also known as Deh-i-Nau) is a village in Kavir Rural District of Deyhuk District in Tabas County, South Khorasan province, Iran.

== Demographics ==
=== Population ===
At the time of the 2006 National Census, the village's population was 508 in 130 households, when it was in Yazd province. The following census in 2011 counted 668 people in 159 households. The 2016 census measured the population of the village as 607 people in 197 households, by which time the county had been separated from the province to join South Khorasan province.
