= Lowlak-e Lobivar =

Village in Mazandaran province, Iran

Lowlak-e Lobivar Persian: لولاک لبيور
- Village
- Location within Iran
- Coordinates: 36°16′53″N 53°03′20″E
- Country: Iran
- Province: Mazandaran
- County: Savadkuh
- District: Zirab
- Rural District: Kaseliyan

Population (2016)
  - Total: 51
- Time zone: UTC+3:30 (IRST)

Lowlak-e Lobivar (Persian: لولاک لبيور) (Note: Also romanized as Lowlāk-e Lobīvar) is a village in Kaseliyan Rural District of Zirab District in Savadkuh County, Mazandaran province, Iran.

== Demographics ==
=== Population ===
The village did not appear in the 2006 National Census, when it was in the Central District. The following census in 2011 counted 66 people in 22 households. The 2016 census measured the population of the village as 51 people in 17 households, by which time the rural district had been separated from the district in the formation of Zirab District.
