= Zanughan =

Village in South Khorasan province, Iran

Zanughan Persian: زنوغان
- Village
- Location within Iran
- Coordinates: 32°59′17″N 57°39′59″E
- Country: Iran
- Province: South Khorasan
- County: Tabas
- District: Deyhuk
- Rural District: Kavir

Population (2016)
  - Total: 487
- Time zone: UTC+3:30 (IRST)

Zanughan (Persian: زنوغان) (Note: Also romanized as Zanoo Ghan, Zanūghān, Zenowghān, and Zenughān; also known as Zanāgūn and Zānāqūn) is a village in, and the capital of, Kavir Rural District in Deyhuk District of Tabas County, South Khorasan province, Iran.

== Demographics ==
=== Population ===
At the time of the 2006 National Census, the village's population was 371 in 121 households, when it was in Yazd province. The following census in 2011 counted 560 people in 178 households. The 2016 census measured the population of the village as 487 people in 167 households, by which time the county had been separated from the province to join South Khorasan province.
