= Laybid =

City in Isfahan province, Iran

Laybid Persian: لایبید
- City
- Location within Iran
- Coordinates: 33°27′33″N 50°41′36″E
- Country: Iran
- Province: Isfahan
- County: Meymeh and Vazvan
- District: Laybid
- Established as a city: 2007

Population (2016)
  - Total: 1,832
- Time zone: UTC+3:30 (IRST)

Laybid (Persian: لایبید) (Note: Also romanized as Lāibid, Lay Bid, and Lāy Bīd; also known as Lāy Bīd-e Pā’īn, Lāybīd Bālā, Lāybīd-e Bālā, Layé Bīd, Layé Bid, Lāy-e Bīd Bālā, and Lāy-e Bīd-e Pā’īn) is a city in, and the capital of, Laybid District in Meymeh and Vazvan County, Isfahan province, Iran.

== Demographics ==
=== Population ===
At the time of the 2006 National Census, Laybid's population was 1,986 in 510 households, when it was a village in Zarkan Rural District of Meymeh District (Note: Renamed the Central District of Meymeh and Vazvan County) in Borkhar and Meymeh County. The following census in 2011 counted 1,473 people in 424 households, by which time the district had been separated from the county in the establishment of Shahin Shahr and Meymeh County. At the same time, the village of Laybid was converted to a city. (Note: Renamed Shahinshahr County) The 2016 census measured the population of the city as 1,832 people in 571 households.

In 2024, the district was separated from the county in the establishment of Meymeh and Vazvan County and renamed the Central District. Laybid and the rural district were transferred to the new Laybid District.
