= Mavdar =

Village in South Khorasan province, Iran

Mavdar Persian: ماودر
- Village
- Location within Iran
- Coordinates: 33°28′00″N 57°16′28″E
- Country: Iran
- Province: South Khorasan
- County: Tabas
- District: Deyhuk
- Rural District: Deyhuk

Population (2016)
  - Total: 152
- Time zone: UTC+3:30 (IRST)

Mavdar (Persian: ماودر) (Note: Also romanized as Māvdar and Māvdār) is a village in Deyhuk Rural District of Deyhuk District in Tabas County, South Khorasan province, Iran.

== Demographics ==
=== Population ===
At the time of the 2006 National Census, the village's population was 143 in 35 households, when it was in Yazd province. The following census in 2011 counted 188 people in 53 households. The 2016 census measured the population of the village as 152 people in 46 households, by which time the county had been separated from the province to join South Khorasan province.
