= Arababad, South Khorasan =

Village in South Khorasan province, Iran

Arababad Persian: عرباباد
- Village
- Location within Iran
- Coordinates: 33°02′09″N 57°40′46″E
- Country: Iran
- Province: South Khorasan
- County: Tabas
- District: Deyhuk
- Rural District: Kavir

Population (2016)
  - Total: 400
- Time zone: UTC+3:30 (IRST)

Arababad (Persian: عرباباد) (Note: Also romanized as ‘Arabābād) is a village in Kavir Rural District of Deyhuk District in Tabas County, South Khorasan province, Iran.

== Demographics ==
=== Population ===
At the time of the 2006 National Census, the village's population was 325 in 102 households, when it was in Yazd province. The following census in 2011 counted 446 people in 127 households. The 2016 census measured the population of the village as 400 people in 132 households, by which time the county had been separated from the province to join South Khorasan province.
