= Bahmanan =

Village in Mazandaran province, Iran

Bahmanan Persian: بهمنان
- Village
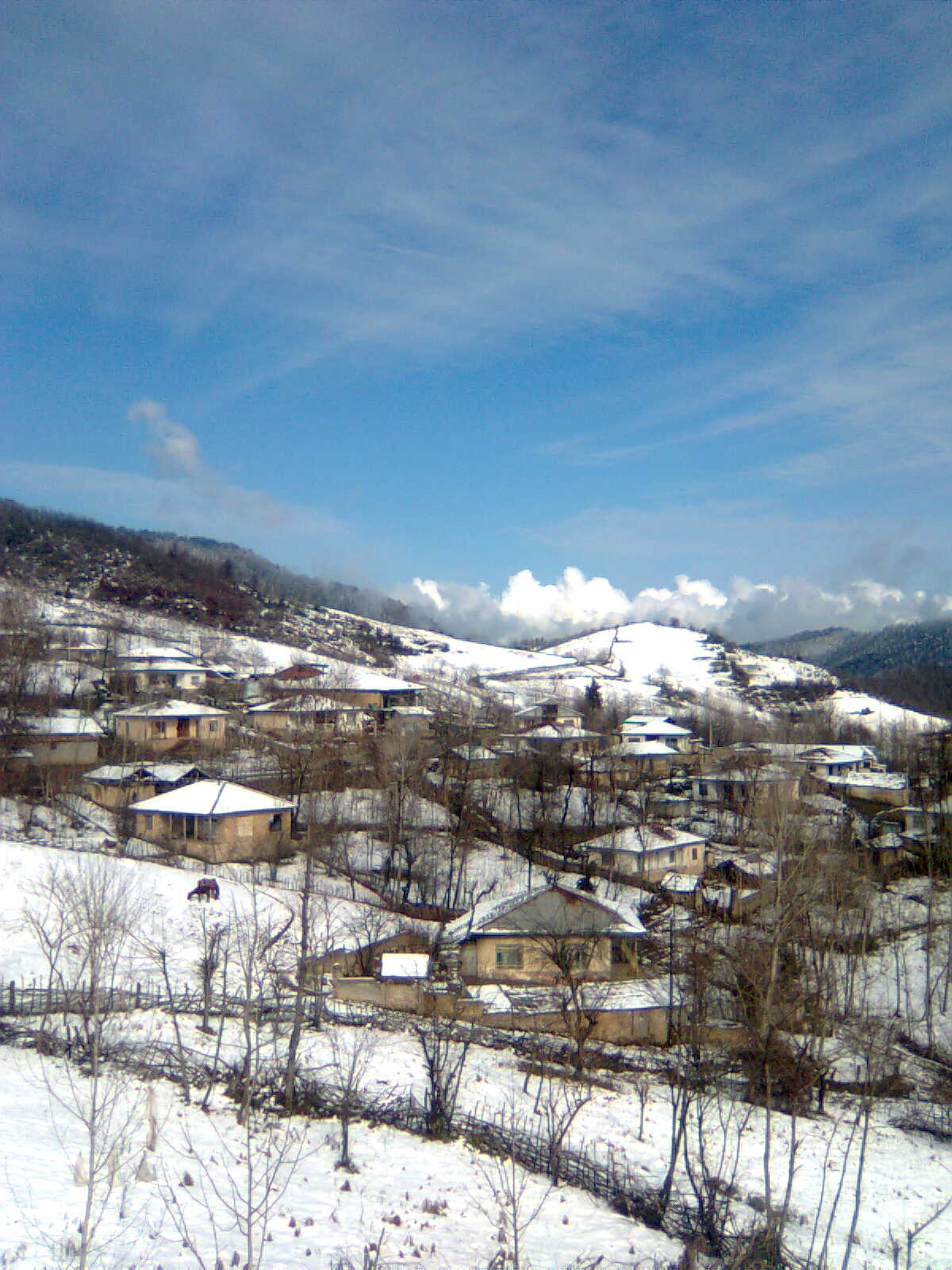
- The village of Bahmanan in winter

- Location within Iran
- Coordinates: 36°13′17″N 52°59′00″E
- Country: Iran
- Province: Mazandaran
- County: Savadkuh
- District: Zirab
- Rural District: Kaseliyan

Population (2016)
  - Total: 356
- Time zone: UTC+3:30 (IRST)

Bahmanan (Persian: بهمنان) (Note: Also romanized as Bahmanān) is a village in Kaseliyan Rural District of Zirab District in Savadkuh County, Mazandaran province, Iran.

== Demographics ==
=== Population ===
At the time of the 2006 National Census, the village's population was 73 in 25 households, when it was in the Central District. The following census in 2011 counted 236 people in 74 households. The 2016 census measured the population of the village as 356 people in 121 households, by which time the rural district had been separated from the district in the formation of Zirab District.
