= Chiruk =

Village in South Khorasan province, Iran

Chiruk Persian: چيروك
- Village
- Location within Iran
- Coordinates: 33°22′43″N 57°15′14″E
- Country: Iran
- Province: South Khorasan
- County: Tabas
- District: Deyhuk
- Rural District: Deyhuk

Population (2016)
  - Total: 215
- Time zone: UTC+3:30 (IRST)

Chiruk (Persian: چيروك) (Note: Also romanized as Chīrūk; also known as Chīrūk-e Bālā) is a village in Deyhuk Rural District of Deyhuk District in Tabas County, South Khorasan province, Iran.

== Demographics ==
=== Population ===
At the time of the 2006 National Census, the village's population was 120 in 35 households, when it was in Yazd province. The following census in 2011 counted 109 people in 35 households. The 2016 census measured the population of the village as 215 people in 58 households, by which time the county had been separated from the province to join South Khorasan province.
