= Azan, Isfahan =

Village in Isfahan province, Iran

Azan Persian: ازان
- Village
- Location within Iran
- Coordinates: 33°25′07″N 51°09′23″E
- Country: Iran
- Province: Isfahan
- County: Meymeh and Vazvan
- District: Central
- Rural District: Azan

Population (2016)
  - Total: 3,102
- Time zone: UTC+3:30 (IRST)

Azan (Persian: ازان) (Note: Also romanized as Āzān and Azān) is a village in, and the capital of, Azan Rural District in the Central District (Note: Formerly Meymeh District of Shahinshahr County) of Meymeh and Vazvan County, Isfahan province, Iran.

== Demographics ==
=== Population ===
At the time of the 2006 National Census, the village's population was 2,578 in 731 households, when it was in Vandadeh Rural District of Meymeh District (Note: Renamed the Central District of Meymeh and Vazvan County) in Borkhar and Meymeh County. The following census in 2011 counted 2,966 people in 917 households, by which time the district had been separated from the county in the establishment of Shahin Shahr and Meymeh County. (Note: Renamed Shahinshahr County) The 2016 census measured the population of the village as 3,102 people in 1,014 households, the most populous in its rural district.

In 2024, the district was separated from the county in the establishment of Meymeh and Vazvan County and renamed the Central District. Azan was transferred to Azan Rural District created in the same district.
