= Kar Salar =

Village in Mazandaran province, Iran

Kar Salar Persian: كارسالار
- Village
- Location within Iran
- Coordinates: 36°12′43″N 52°55′13″E
- Country: Iran
- Province: Mazandaran
- County: Savadkuh
- District: Zirab
- Rural District: Sorkhkola

Population (2016)
  - Total: 263
- Time zone: UTC+3:30 (IRST)

Kar Salar (Persian: كارسالار) (Note: Also romanized as Kār Sālār; also known as Kārsūlār) is a village in Sorkhkola Rural District of Zirab District in Savadkuh County, Mazandaran province, Iran.

== Demographics ==
=== Population ===
At the time of the 2006 National Census, the village's population was 183 in 47 households, when it was in the Central District. The following census in 2011 counted 146 people in 47 households. The 2016 census measured the population of the village as 263 people in 80 households, by which time the rural district had been separated from the district in the formation of Zirab District. Kar Salar was the most populous village in its rural district.
