= Marghub =

Village in South Khorasan province, Iran

Marghub Persian: مرغوب
- Village
- Location within Iran
- Coordinates: 33°04′47″N 57°33′27″E
- Country: Iran
- Province: South Khorasan
- County: Tabas
- District: Deyhuk
- Rural District: Kavir

Population (2016)
  - Total: 426
- Time zone: UTC+3:30 (IRST)

Marghub (Persian: مرغوب) (Note: Also romanized as Marghūb; also known as Mar’oob, Morqūm, and Murghūm) is a village in Kavir Rural District of Deyhuk District in Tabas County, South Khorasan province, Iran.

== Demographics ==
=== Population ===
At the time of the 2006 National Census, the village's population was 269 in 84 households, when it was in Yazd province. The following census in 2011 counted 367 people in 112 households. The 2016 census measured the population of the village as 426 people in 138 households, by which time the county had been separated from the province to join South Khorasan province.
