= Esfandiar, South Khorasan =

Village in South Khorasan province, Iran

Esfandiar Persian: اسفنديار
- Village
- Location within Iran
- Coordinates: 33°02′11″N 57°33′32″E
- Country: Iran
- Province: South Khorasan
- County: Tabas
- District: Deyhuk
- Rural District: Kavir

Population (2016)
  - Total: 1,289
- Time zone: UTC+3:30 (IRST)

Esfandiar (Persian: اسفنديار) (Note: Also romanized as Esfandīār, Esfandīyār, and Isfandiyār) is a village in Kavir Rural District of Deyhuk District in Tabas County, South Khorasan province, Iran.

== Demographics ==
=== Population ===
At the time of the 2006 National Census, the village's population was 1,019 in 278 households, when it was in Yazd province. The following census in 2011 counted 1,270 people in 367 households. The 2016 census measured the population of the village as 1,289 people in 401 households, by which time the county had been separated from the province to join South Khorasan province. Esfandiar was the most populous village in its rural district.
