= Emamzadeh Ali, South Khorasan =

Village in South Khorasan province, Iran

Emamzadeh Ali Persian: امامزاده علي
- Village
- Location within Iran
- Coordinates: 33°28′03″N 57°24′20″E
- Country: Iran
- Province: South Khorasan
- County: Tabas
- District: Deyhuk
- Rural District: Deyhuk

Population (2016)
  - Total: 105
- Time zone: UTC+3:30 (IRST)

Emamzadeh Ali (Persian: امامزاده علي) (Note: Also romanized as Emāmzādeh ‘Alī; also known as Deh-e Shāhzādeh ‘Alī) is a village in Deyhuk Rural District of Deyhuk District in Tabas County, South Khorasan province, Iran.

== Demographics ==
=== Population ===
At the time of the 2006 National Census, the village's population was 69 in 20 households, when it was in Yazd province. The following census in 2011 counted 103 people in 31 households. The 2016 census measured the population of the village as 105 people in 33 households, by which time the county had been separated from the province to join South Khorasan province.
