= Saidabad-e Sofla =

Saidabad-e Sofla (Persian: سعيدابادسفلي) or Saidabad-e Pain (Persian: سعيدابادپائین), both meaning "Lower Saidabad", may refer to:

- Saidabad-e Sofla, Kerman
- Saidabad-e Sofla, Zanjan
