= Saidabad-e Olya =

Saidabad-e Olya (Persian: سعيدابادعليا) or Saidabad-e Bala (Persian: سعيدابادبالا), both meaning "Upper Saidabad", may refer to:

- Saidabad-e Olya, Kerman
- Saidabad-e Olya, Zanjan
