= Valila, Iran =

Valila وليلا
- Village
- Location within Iran
- Coordinates: 36°15′52″N 53°02′44″E
- Country: Iran
- Province: Mazandaran
- County: Savadkuh
- Bakhsh: Zirab
- Rural District: Kaseliyan

Population (2016)
  - Total: 91
- Time zone: UTC+3:30 (IRST)

Valila (Persian: وليلا, also Romanized as Valīlā; also known as Valbalā) is a village in Kaseliyan Rural District, in Zirab District of Savadkuh County, Mazandaran Province, Iran. At the 2016 census, its population was 91, in 35 families. Increased from 47 in 2006.
