= Sorond, Tabas =

Village in South Khorasan province, Iran

Sorond Persian: سرند
- Village
- Location within Iran
- Coordinates: 33°29′15″N 57°18′15″E
- Country: Iran
- Province: South Khorasan
- County: Tabas
- District: Deyhuk
- Rural District: Deyhuk

Population (2016)
  - Total: 189
- Time zone: UTC+3:30 (IRST)

Sorond (Persian: سرند) is a village in Deyhuk Rural District of Deyhuk District in Tabas County, South Khorasan province, Iran.

== Demographics ==
=== Population ===
At the time of the 2006 National Census, the village's population was 197 in 47 households, when it was in Yazd province. The following census in 2011 counted 220 people in 51 households. The 2016 census measured the population of the village as 189 people in 53 households, by which time the county had been separated from the province to join South Khorasan province.
