= Lajim =

Village in Mazandaran province, Iran

Lajim Persian: لاجيم
- Village
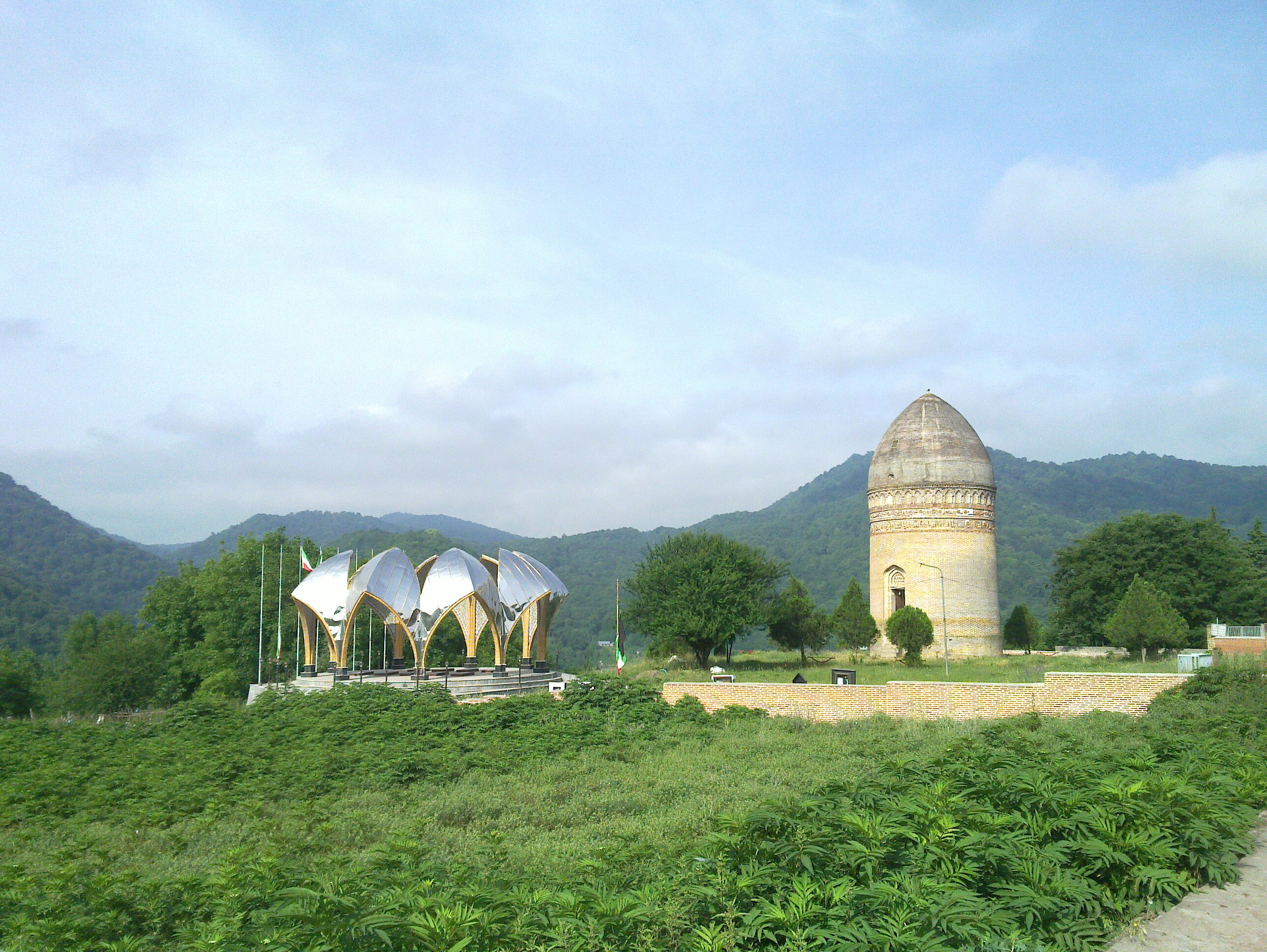
- Lajim tower

- Location within Iran
- Coordinates: 36°15′22″N 53°06′27″E
- Country: Iran
- Province: Mazandaran
- County: Savadkuh
- District: Zirab
- Rural District: Kaseliyan

Population (2016)
  - Total: 578
- Time zone: UTC+3:30 (IRST)

Lajim (Persian: لاجيم) (Note: Also romanized as Lājīm) is a village in Kaseliyan Rural District of Zirab District in Savadkuh County, Mazandaran province, Iran.

== Demographics ==
=== Population ===
At the time of the 2006 National Census, the village's population was 742 in 188 households, when it was in the Central District. The following census in 2011 counted 778 people in 233 households. The 2016 census measured the population of the village as 578 people in 201 households, by which time the rural district had been separated from the district in the formation of Zirab District. Lajim was the most populous village in its rural district.
