= Sang Nisht =

Village in Mazandaran province, Iran

Sang Nisht Persian: سنگنيشت
- Village
- Location within Iran
- Coordinates: 36°11′56″N 53°03′09″E
- Country: Iran
- Province: Mazandaran
- County: Savadkuh
- District: Zirab
- Rural District: Kaseliyan

Population (2016)
  - Total: 494
- Time zone: UTC+3:30 (IRST)

Sang Nisht (Persian: سنگنيشت) (Note: Also romanized as Sang Nīsht) is a village in Kaseliyan Rural District of Zirab District in Savadkuh County, Mazandaran province, Iran.

== Demographics ==
=== Population ===
At the time of the 2006 National Census, the village's population was 512 in 125 households, when it was in the Central District. The following census in 2011 counted 578 people in 158 households. The 2016 census measured the population of the village as 494 people in 168 households, by which time the rural district had been separated from the district in the formation of Zirab District.
