= Vachad =

Village in Mazandaran province, Iran

Vachad Persian: وچاد
- Village
- Location within Iran
- Coordinates: 36°11′44″N 52°55′35″E
- Country: Iran
- Province: Mazandaran
- County: Savadkuh
- District: Zirab
- Rural District: Sorkhkola

Population (2016)
  - Total: 153
- Time zone: UTC+3:30 (IRST)

Vachad (Persian: وچاد) (Note: Also romanized as Vachād; also known as Jamshid Abad) is a village in Sorkhkola Rural District of Zirab District in Savadkuh County, Mazandaran province, Iran.

== Demographics ==
=== Population ===
At the time of the 2006 National Census, the village's population was 89 in 20 households, when it was in the Central District. The following census in 2011 counted 173 people in 55 households. The 2016 census measured the population of the village as 153 people in 53 households, by which time the rural district had been separated from the district in the formation of Zirab District.
