= Saidabad, South Khorasan =

Saidabad سعيد اباد
- Village
- Location within Iran
- Coordinates: 33°07′43″N 57°40′39″E
- Country: Iran
- Province: South Khorasan
- County: Tabas
- Bakhsh: Deyhuk
- Rural District: Kavir

Population (2006)
  - Total: 74
- Time zone: UTC+3:30 (IRST)
  - Summer (DST): UTC+4:30 (IRDT)

Saidabad (Persian: سعيد اباد, also Romanized as Sa‘īdābād and Saiyidābād; also known as Seyyedābād) is a village in Kavir Rural District, Deyhuk District, Tabas County, South Khorasan Province, Iran. At the 2006 census, its population was 74, in 16 families.
