= Saidabad, Meymeh and Vazvan =

Village in Isfahan province, Iran

Saidabad Persian: سعيداباد
- Village
- Location within Iran
- Coordinates: 33°22′48″N 51°11′19″E
- Country: Iran
- Province: Isfahan
- County: Meymeh and Vazvan
- District: Central
- Rural District: Vandadeh

Population (2016)
  - Total: 36
- Time zone: UTC+3:30 (IRST)

Saidabad (Persian: سعيداباد) (Note: Also romanized as Sa‘īdābād; also known as Seyyedābād) is a village in Vandadeh Rural District of the Central District (Note: Formerly Meymeh District of Shahinshahr County) in Meymeh and Vazvan County, Isfahan province, Iran.

== Demographics ==
=== Population ===
At the time of the 2006 National Census, the village's population was 37 in 12 households, when it was in Meymeh District (Note: Renamed the Central District of Meymeh and Vazvan County) of Borkhar and Meymeh County. The following census in 2011 counted 38 people in 11 households, by which time the district had been separated from the county in the establishment of Shahin Shahr and Meymeh County. (Note: Renamed Shahinshahr County) The 2016 census measured the population of the village as 36 people in 12 households.

In 2024, the district was separated from the county in the establishment of Meymeh and Vazvan County and renamed the Central District.
