= Seyyedabad, Mazandaran =

Village in Mazandaran province, Iran

Seyyedabad Persian: سيدآباد
- Village
- Location within Iran
- Country: Iran
- Province: Mazandaran
- County: Savadkuh
- District: Zirab
- Rural District: Sorkhkola

Population (2016)
  - Total: 42
- Time zone: UTC+3:30 (IRST)

Seyyedabad (Persian: سيدآباد) (Note: Also romanized as Seyyedābād) is a village in Sorkhkola Rural District of Zirab District in Savadkuh County, Mazandaran province, Iran.

== Demographics ==
=== Population ===
At the time of the 2006 National Census, the village's population was 46 in 12 households, when it was in the Central District. The following census in 2011 counted 37 people in 12 households. The 2016 census measured the population of the village as 42 people in 18 households, by which time the rural district had been separated from the district in the formation of Zirab District.
