= Sorkhkola Rural District =

Rural district in Mazandaran province, Iran

Sorkhkola Rural District Persian: دهستان سرخكلا
- Rural District
- Location within Iran
- Coordinates: 36°12′N 52°57′E
- Country: Iran
- Province: Mazandaran
- County: Savadkuh
- District: Zirab
- Established: 1987
- Capital: Sorkhkola Tappeh

Population (2016)
  - Total: 968
- Time zone: UTC+3:30 (IRST)

Sorkhkola Rural District (Persian: دهستان سرخكلا) is in Zirab District of Savadkuh County, Mazandaran province, Iran. The capital of the rural district is the village of Sorkhkola Tappeh.

== Demographics ==
=== Population ===
At the time of the 2006 National Census, the rural district's population was (as a part of the Central District) was 520 in 136 households. There were 552 inhabitants in 186 households at the following census of 2011. The 2016 census measured the population of the rural district as 968 in 329 households, by which time the rural district had been separated from the district in the formation of Zirab District. The most populous of its 16 villages was Kar Salar, with 263 people.

=== Other villages in the rural district ===
- Javarem
- Kanij Kola
- Madan-e Zirab
- Seyyedabad
- Vachad
