= Deyhuk =

City in South Khorasan province, Iran

Deyhuk Persian: دیهوک
- City
- Location within Iran
- Coordinates: 33°17′21″N 57°31′09″E
- Country: Iran
- Province: South Khorasan
- County: Tabas
- District: Deyhuk

Population (2016)
  - Total: 2,959
- Time zone: UTC+3:30 (IRST)

Deyhuk (Persian: دیهوک) (Note: Also romanized as Deyhūk; also known as Dohak, Dūhak, and Dūhuk) is a city in, and the capital of, Deyhuk District in Tabas County, South Khorasan province, Iran. It also serves as the administrative center for Deyhuk Rural District.

== Demographics ==
=== Population ===
At the time of the 2006 National Census, the city's population was 2,767 in 766 households, when it was in Yazd province. The following census in 2011 counted 3,346 people in 890 households. The 2016 census measured the population of the city as 2,959 people in 867 households, by which time the county had been separated from the province to join South Khorasan province.
