= Seyyedabad, East Azerbaijan =

Seyyedabad سيداباد
- Village
- Location within Iran
- Coordinates: 38°41′23″N 46°46′01″E
- Country: Iran
- Province: East Azerbaijan
- County: Varzaqan
- Bakhsh: Central
- Rural District: Ozomdel-e Shomali

Population (2006)
  - Total: 43
- Time zone: UTC+3:30 (IRST)
  - Summer (DST): UTC+4:30 (IRDT)

Seyyedabad (Persian: سيداباد, also Romanized as Seyyedābād; also known as Seyyed Lar) is a village in Ozomdel-e Shomali Rural District, in the Central District of Varzaqan County, East Azerbaijan Province, Iran. At the 2006 census, its population was 43, in 9 families.
