= Vandadeh Rural District =

Rural district in Isfahan province, Iran

Vandadeh Rural District Persian: دهستان ونداده
- Rural District
- Location within Iran
- Coordinates: 33°23′08″N 51°12′27″E
- Country: Iran
- Province: Isfahan
- County: Meymeh and Vazvan
- District: Central
- Established: 1987
- Capital: Vandadeh

Population (2016)
  - Total: 6,605
- Time zone: UTC+3:30 (IRST)

Vandadeh Rural District (Persian: دهستان ونداده) is in the Central District (Note: Formerly Meymeh District of Shahinshahr County) of Meymeh and Vazvan County, Isfahan province, Iran. Its capital is the village of Vandadeh.

== Demographics ==
=== Population ===
At the time of the 2006 National Census, the rural district's population (as a part of Meymeh District (Note: Renamed the Central District of Meymeh and Vazvan County) in Borkhar and Meymeh County) was 5,756 in 1,752 households. There were 6,322 inhabitants in 1,990 households at the following census of 2011, by which time the district had been separated from the county in the establishment of Shahin Shahr and Meymeh County. (Note: Renamed Shahinshahr County) The 2016 census measured the population of the rural district as 6,605 in 2,184 households. The most populous of its 48 villages was Azan (now in Azan Rural District), with 3,102 people.

In 2024, the district was separated from the county in the establishment of Meymeh and Vazvan County and renamed the Central District.

=== Other villages in the rural district ===
- Chaqa Deh
- Khosrowabad
- Maravand
- Qasemabad
- Saidabad
