= Seyyedabad-e Asadollah Khan =

Seyyedabad-e Asadollah Khan سيداباداسداله خان
- Village
- Location within Iran
- Coordinates: 36°30′08″N 58°29′49″E
- Country: Iran
- Province: Razavi Khorasan
- County: Nishapur
- Bakhsh: Central
- Rural District: Binalud

Population (2006)
  - Total: 77
- Time zone: UTC+3:30 (IRST)
  - Summer (DST): UTC+4:30 (IRDT)

Seyyedabad-e Asadollah Khan (Persian: سيداباداسداله خان, also Romanized as Seyyedābād-e Āsadollah Khān; also known as Seyyedābād-e Āsadollahkhān) is a village in Binalud Rural District, in the Central District of Nishapur County, Razavi Khorasan Province, Iran. At the 2006 census, its population was 77, in 21 families.
