= Saidabad, Kerman =

Saidabad سعيداباد
- Village
- Country: Iran
- Province: Kerman
- County: Kerman
- Bakhsh: Mahan
- Rural District: Mahan

Population (2006)
  - Total: 10
- Time zone: UTC+3:30 (IRST)
  - Summer (DST): UTC+4:30 (IRDT)

Saidabad (Persian: سعيداباد, also Romanized as Saʿīdābād) is a village in Mahan Rural District, Mahan District, Kerman County, Kerman Province, Iran. At the 2006 census, its population was 10, in 4 families.
