= Seyyedabad-e Qajer =

Seyyedabad-e Qajer سيدابادقاجر
- Village
- Country: Iran
- Province: West Azerbaijan
- County: Bukan
- Bakhsh: Central
- Rural District: Il Teymur

Population (2006)
  - Total: 236
- Time zone: UTC+3:30 (IRST)
  - Summer (DST): UTC+4:30 (IRDT)

Seyyedabad-e Qajer (Persian: سيدابادقاجر, also Romanized as Seyyedābād-e Qājer) is a village in Il Teymur Rural District, in the Central District of Bukan County, West Azerbaijan Province, Iran. At the 2006 census, its population was 236, in 43 families.
