= Saidabad-e Shafipur =

Saidabad-e Shafipur سعيدابادشفيع پور
- Village
- Location within Iran
- Coordinates: 30°18′55″N 56°03′50″E
- Country: Iran
- Province: Kerman
- County: Rafsanjan
- Bakhsh: Central
- Rural District: Kabutar Khan

Population (2006)
  - Total: 345
- Time zone: UTC+3:30 (IRST)
  - Summer (DST): UTC+4:30 (IRDT)

Saidabad-e Shafipur (Persian: سعيدابادشفيع پور, also Romanized as Saʿīdābād-e Shafīʿpūr and Saʿeedābād-e Shafīʿpūr) is a village in Kabutar Khan Rural District, in the Central District of Rafsanjan County, Kerman Province, Iran. At the 2006 census, its population was 345, in 72 families.
