= Saidabad Rural District =

Saidabad Rural District (Persian: دهستان سعیدآباد) may refer to:

- Saidabad Rural District (Ijrud County), Zanjan province
- Saidabad Rural District (Pardis County), Tehran province
- Saidabad Rural District (Savojbolagh County), Alborz province
- Saidabad Rural District (Shahriar County), Tehran province
