= Qanbar Sini =

Qanbar Sini قنبرسيني
- Village
- Location within Iran
- Coordinates: 32°25′56″N 50°17′53″E
- Country: Iran
- Province: Chaharmahal and Bakhtiari
- County: Kuhrang
- Bakhsh: Central
- Rural District: Dasht-e Zarrin

Population (2006)
  - Total: 195
- Time zone: UTC+3:30 (IRST)
  - Summer (DST): UTC+4:30 (IRDT)

Qanbar Sini (Persian: قنبرسيني, also Romanized as Qanbar Sīnī) is a village in Dasht-e Zarrin Rural District, in the Central District of Kuhrang County, Chaharmahal and Bakhtiari Province, Iran. At the 2006 census, its population was 195, in 36 families. The village is populated by Lurs.
