= Kalateh-ye Seyyed Ali, Gonabad =

Kalateh-ye Seyyed Ali كلاته سيدعلي
- Village
- Location within Iran
- Coordinates: 34°19′08″N 58°25′10″E
- Country: Iran
- Province: Razavi Khorasan
- County: Gonabad
- Bakhsh: Kakhk
- Rural District: Zibad

Population (2006)
  - Total: 18
- Time zone: UTC+3:30 (IRST)
  - Summer (DST): UTC+4:30 (IRDT)

Kalateh-ye Seyyed Ali (Persian: كلاته سيدعلي, also Romanized as Kalāteh-ye Seyyed ‘Alī) is a village in Zibad Rural District, Kakhk District, Gonabad County, Razavi Khorasan Province, Iran. At the 2006 census, its population was 18, in 9 families.
