= Kalateh-ye Seyyed Ali, Mashhad =

Kalateh-ye Seyyed Ali كلاته سيدعلي
- Village
- Location within Iran
- Coordinates: 36°28′30″N 59°28′49″E
- Country: Iran
- Province: Razavi Khorasan
- County: Mashhad
- Bakhsh: Central
- Rural District: Tus

Population (2006)
  - Total: 238
- Time zone: UTC+3:30 (IRST)
  - Summer (DST): UTC+4:30 (IRDT)

Kalateh-ye Seyyed Ali (Persian: كلاته سيدعلي, also Romanized as Kalāteh-ye Seyyed ‘Alī) is a village in Tus Rural District, in the Central District of Mashhad County, Razavi Khorasan Province, Iran. At the 2006 census, its population was 238, in 61 families.
