= Seyyedabad-e Jamian =

Seyyedabad-e Jamian سيد آباد جميان
- Village
- Location within Iran
- Coordinates: 36°18′06″N 46°12′43″E
- Country: Iran
- Province: Kurdistan
- County: Saqqez
- Bakhsh: Central
- Rural District: Torjan

Population (2006)
  - Total: 57
- Time zone: UTC+3:30 (IRST)
  - Summer (DST): UTC+4:30 (IRDT)

Seyyedabad-e Jamian (Persian: سيد آباد جميان, also Romanized as Seyyedābād-e Jamīān; also known as Seyyedābād) is a village in Torjan Rural District, in the Central District of Saqqez County, Kurdistan Province, Iran. At the 2006 census, its population was 57, in 9 families. The village is populated by Kurds.
