= Chakab, Razavi Khorasan =

Chakab چكاب
- Village
- Location within Iran
- Coordinates: 35°49′33″N 59°50′54″E
- Country: Iran
- Province: Razavi Khorasan
- County: Fariman
- Bakhsh: Central
- Rural District: Fariman

Population (2006)
  - Total: 24
- Time zone: UTC+3:30 (IRST)
  - Summer (DST): UTC+4:30 (IRDT)

Chakab (Persian: چكاب, also Romanized as Chakāb and Chekāb) is a village in Fariman Rural District, in the Central District of Fariman County, Razavi Khorasan Province, Iran. At the 2006 census, its population was 24, in 5 families.
