= Saidabad, Chaldoran =

Saidabad سعيداباد
- Village
- Location within Iran
- Coordinates: 38°53′30″N 44°25′04″E
- Country: Iran
- Province: West Azerbaijan
- County: Chaldoran
- Bakhsh: Central
- Rural District: Chaldoran-e Jonubi

Population (2006)
  - Total: 58
- Time zone: UTC+3:30 (IRST)
  - Summer (DST): UTC+4:30 (IRDT)

Saidabad (Persian: سعيداباد, also Romanized as Sa‘īdābād) is a village in Chaldoran-e Jonubi Rural District, in the Central District of Chaldoran County, West Azerbaijan Province, Iran. At the 2006 census, its population was 58, in 8 families.
