= Azan Rural District =

Rural district in Isfahan province, Iran

Azan Rural District Persian: دهستان ازان
- Rural District
- Location within Iran
- Coordinates: 33°25′07″N 51°09′23″E
- Country: Iran
- Province: Isfahan
- County: Meymeh and Vazvan
- District: Central
- Capital: Azan
- Time zone: UTC+3:30 (IRST)

Azan Rural District (Persian: دهستان ازان) is in the Central District (Note: Formerly Meymeh District of Shahinshahr County) of Meymeh and Vazvan County, Isfahan province, Iran. Its capital is the village of Azan, whose population at the time of the 2016 National Census was 3,102 people in 1,014 households.

== History ==
In 2007, Borkhar and Meymeh County was divided into Borkhar County and Shahinshahr and Meymeh County, (Note: Renamed Shahinshahr County) the latter of which was divided into two districts of two rural districts each.

In 2024, Meymeh District (Note: Renamed the Central District of Meymeh and Vazvan County) was separated from the county in the establishment of Meymeh and Vazvan County and renamed the Central District. Azan Rural District was created in the same district.

== Other villages in the rural district ==
- Ziadabad
