= Kalateh-ye Feshay =

Kalateh-ye Feshay كلاته فشاي
- Village
- Location within Iran
- Coordinates: 36°45′21″N 58°31′25″E
- Country: Iran
- Province: Razavi Khorasan
- County: Nishapur
- Bakhsh: Sarvelayat
- Rural District: Sarvelayat

Population (2006)
  - Total: 66
- Time zone: UTC+3:30 (IRST)
  - Summer (DST): UTC+4:30 (IRDT)

Kalateh-ye Feshay (Persian: كلاته فشاي, also Romanized as Kalāteh-ye Feshāy; also known as Seyyedābād) is a village in Sarvelayat Rural District, Sarvelayat District, Nishapur County, Razavi Khorasan Province, Iran. At the 2006 census, its population was 66, in 17 families.
