= Vazvan =

City in Isfahan province, Iran

Vazvan Persian: وزوان
- City
- Location within Iran
- Coordinates: 33°24′58″N 51°10′52″E
- Country: Iran
- Province: Isfahan
- County: Meymeh and Vazvan
- District: Central

Population (2016)
  - Total: 5,952
- Time zone: UTC+3:30 (IRST)

Vazvan (Persian: وزوان) (Note: Also romanized as Vazvān and Wazwan) is a city in, and the capital of, the Central District in Meymeh and Vazvan County, Isfahan province, Iran. The major agricultural crops are wheat and potatoes.

== Demographics ==
=== Population ===
At the time of the 2006 National Census, the city's population was 4,661 in 1,413 households, when it was in Meymeh District (Note: Renamed the Central District of Meymeh and Vazvan County) in Borkhar and Meymeh County. The following census in 2011 counted 4,559 people in 1,476 households, by which time the district had been separated from the county in the establishment of Shahin Shahr and Meymeh County. (Note: Renamed Shahinshahr County) The 2016 census measured the population of the city as 5,952 people in 1,980 households.

In 2024, the district was separated from the county in the establishment of Meymeh and Vazvan County and renamed the Central District, with Vazvan as its capital.
