= Seyyedabad, Ravar =

Seyyedabad سيداباد
- Village
- Location within Iran
- Coordinates: 31°31′57″N 56°29′42″E
- Country: Iran
- Province: Kerman
- County: Ravar
- Bakhsh: Central
- Rural District: Ravar

Population (2006)
  - Total: 16
- Time zone: UTC+3:30 (IRST)
  - Summer (DST): UTC+4:30 (IRDT)

Seyyedabad (Persian: سيداباد, also Romanized as Seyyedābād) is a village in Ravar Rural District, in the Central District of Ravar County, Kerman Province, Iran. According to the 2006 census, it has a population of 16, in 4 families.
