= Qanbar Ali-ye Olya =

Qanbar Ali-ye Olya قنبرعلي عليا
- Village
- Location within Iran
- Coordinates: 33°46′51″N 48°03′12″E
- Country: Iran
- Province: Lorestan
- County: Selseleh
- Bakhsh: Firuzabad
- Rural District: Qalayi

Population (2006)
  - Total: 32
- Time zone: UTC+3:30 (IRST)
  - Summer (DST): UTC+4:30 (IRDT)

Qanbar Ali-ye Olya (Persian: قنبرعلي عليا, also Romanized as Qanbar ‘Alī-ye ‘Olyā and Qanbar‘alī-ye ‘Olyā) is a village in Qalayi Rural District, Firuzabad District, Selseleh County, Lorestan Province, Iran. At the 2006 census, its population was 32, in 7 families.
