= Saidabad, Hirmand =

Saidabad سعيد آباد
- Village
- Location within Iran
- Coordinates: 31°05′11″N 61°48′16″E
- Country: Iran
- Province: Sistan and Baluchestan
- County: Hirmand
- Bakhsh: Central
- Rural District: Dust Mohammad

Population (2006)
  - Total: 436
- Time zone: UTC+3:30 (IRST)
  - Summer (DST): UTC+4:30 (IRDT)

Saidabad (Persian: سعيد آباد, also Romanized as Saʿīdābād; also known as Deh-e Şāḩeb ol Zamān and Deh-e Şāḩeb-e Zamān) is a village in Dust Mohammad Rural District, in the Central District of Hirmand County, Sistan and Baluchestan Province, Iran. At the 2006 census, its population was 436, in 87 families.
