= Seyyedabad, Komijan =

Seyyedabad سيداباد
- Village
- Location within Iran
- Coordinates: 34°45′38″N 49°15′07″E
- Country: Iran
- Province: Markazi
- County: Komijan
- Bakhsh: Milajerd
- Rural District: Khosrow Beyk

Population (2006)
  - Total
- Time zone: UTC+3:30 (IRST)
  - Summer (DST): UTC+4:30 (IRDT)

Seyyedabad (Persian: سيداباد, also Romanized as Şeyyedābād and Şeydābād) is a village in Khosrow Beyk Rural District, Milajerd District, Komijan County, Markazi Province, Iran.
