= Seyyedabad-e Bar Madan =

Seyyedabad-e Bar Madan سيدابادبارمعدن
- Village
- Location within Iran
- Coordinates: 36°31′31″N 58°28′20″E
- Country: Iran
- Province: Razavi Khorasan
- County: Nishapur
- Bakhsh: Central
- Rural District: Binalud

Population (2006)
  - Total: 301
- Time zone: UTC+3:30 (IRST)
  - Summer (DST): UTC+4:30 (IRDT)

Seyyedabad-e Bar Madan (Persian: سيدابادبارمعدن, also Romanized as Seyyedābād-e Bār Ma‘dan; also known as Seyyedābād) is a village in Binalud Rural District, in the Central District of Nishapur County, Razavi Khorasan Province, Iran. At the 2006 census, its population was 301, in 74 families.
