= Zirab =

City in Mazandaran province, Iran

Zirab Persian: زيراب
- City
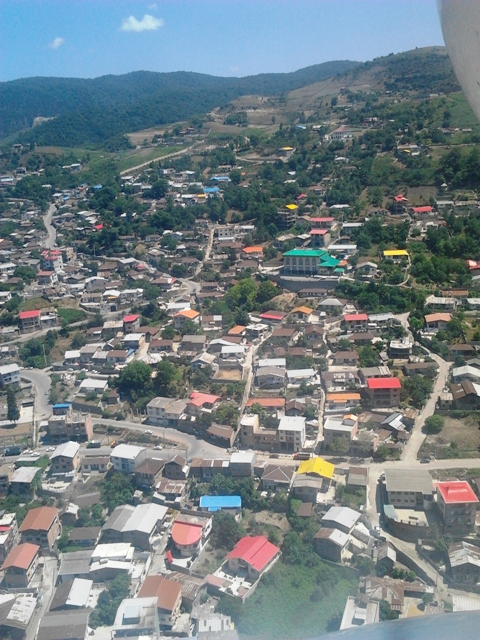
- The city of Zirab

- Location within Iran
- Coordinates: 36°10′46″N 52°58′25″E
- Country: Iran
- Province: Mazandaran
- County: Savadkuh
- District: Zirab

Population (2016)
  - Total: 16,191
- Time zone: UTC+3:30 (IRST)

Zirab (Persian: زيرآب) (Note: Also romanized as Zīr Āb) is a city in, and the capital of, Zirab District in Savadkuh County, Mazandaran province, Iran. It is in the Elburz mountain range.

== Demographics ==
=== Population ===
At the time of the 2006 National Census, the city's population was 18,216 in 4,764 households, when it was in the Central District. The following census in 2011 counted 15,679 people in 4,657 households. The 2016 census measured the population of the city as 16,191 people in 5,330 households, by which time the city had been separated from the district in the formation of Zirab District.
