= Deh-e Shadi Jamal Zehi =

Deh-e Shadi Jamal Zehi ده شادي جمالزهي
- Village
- Location within Iran
- Coordinates: 31°07′20″N 61°47′43″E
- Country: Iran
- Province: Sistan and Baluchestan
- County: Hirmand
- Bakhsh: Central
- Rural District: Jahanabad

Population (2006)
  - Total: 134
- Time zone: UTC+3:30 (IRST)
  - Summer (DST): UTC+4:30 (IRDT)

Deh-e Shadi Jamal Zehi (Persian: ده شادي جمالزهي, also Romanized as Deh-e Shādī Jamāl Zehī; also known as Deh-e Shādī) is a village in Jahanabad Rural District, in the Central District of Hirmand County, Sistan and Baluchestan Province, Iran. At the 2006 census, its population was 134, in 24 families.
