= Saidabad, Anbarabad =

Saidabad سعيداباد
- Village
- Location within Iran
- Coordinates: 28°23′27″N 57°47′28″E
- Country: Iran
- Province: Kerman
- County: Anbarabad
- Bakhsh: Central
- Rural District: Aliabad

Population (2006)
  - Total: 217
- Time zone: UTC+3:30 (IRST)
  - Summer (DST): UTC+4:30 (IRDT)

Saidabad (Persian: سعيداباد, also Romanized as Saʿīdābād; also known as Saeedābād) is a village in Aliabad Rural District, in the Central District of Anbarabad County, Kerman Province, Iran. At the 2006 census, its population was 217, in 48 families.
