= Seyyedabad, Qohestan =

Seyyedabad سيداباد
- Village
- Location within Iran
- Coordinates: 33°08′15″N 59°47′34″E
- Country: Iran
- Province: South Khorasan
- County: Darmian
- Bakhsh: Qohestan
- Rural District: Qohestan

Population (2006)
  - Total: 25
- Time zone: UTC+3:30 (IRST)
  - Summer (DST): UTC+4:30 (IRDT)

Seyyedabad (Persian: سيداباد, also Romanized as Seyyedābād and Saiyidābād; also known as Seyyedābād-e Amīrābād and Seyyedābād-e Mīrābād) is a village in Qohestan Rural District, Qohestan District, Darmian County, South Khorasan Province, Iran. At the 2006 census, its population was 25, in 12 families.
