= Saidabad, Razavi Khorasan =

Saidabad سعيداباد
- Village
- Location within Iran
- Coordinates: 36°36′55″N 59°25′52″E
- Country: Iran
- Province: Razavi Khorasan
- County: Mashhad
- Bakhsh: Central
- Rural District: Darzab

Population (2006)
  - Total: 460
- Time zone: UTC+3:30 (IRST)
  - Summer (DST): UTC+4:30 (IRDT)

Saidabad (Persian: سعيداباد, also Romanized as Saʿīdābād; also known as Seyyedābād), is a village in Darzab Rural District, in the Central District of Mashhad County, Razavi Khorasan Province, Iran. At the 2006 census, its population was 460, in 97 families.
