= Seydabad, Hamadan =

Seydabad صيداباد
- Village
- Location within Iran
- Coordinates: 35°09′19″N 49°18′06″E
- Country: Iran
- Province: Hamadan
- County: Famenin
- Bakhsh: Pish Khowr
- Rural District: Pish Khowr

Population (2006)
  - Total: 86
- Time zone: UTC+3:30 (IRST)
  - Summer (DST): UTC+4:30 (IRDT)

Seydabad (Persian: صيداباد, also Romanized as Şeydābād, Saiyidābād, Seid Abad, and Seyyedābād) is a village in Pish Khowr Rural District, Pish Khowr District, Famenin County, Hamadan Province, Iran. At the 2006 census, its population was 86, in 22 families.
