= Laybid District =

District in Isfahan province, Iran

Laybid District Persian: بخش لایبید
- District
- Location within Iran
- Coordinates: 33°27′N 50°49′E
- Country: Iran
- Province: Isfahan
- County: Meymeh and Vazvan
- Established: 2024
- Capital: Laybid
- Time zone: UTC+3:30 (IRST)

Laybid District (Laybidi/Persian: بخش لایبید) is in Meymeh and Vazvan County of Isfahan province, Iran. Its capital is the city of Laybid, whose population at the time of the 2016 National Census was 1,832 people in 571 households.

== History ==
In 2007, Borkhar and Meymeh County was divided into Borkhar County and Shahinshahr and Meymeh County, (Note: Renamed Shahinshahr County) the latter of which was divided into two districts of two rural districts each, with Shahinshahr as its capital. In 2024, Meymeh District (Note: Renamed the Central District of Meymeh and Vazvan County) was separated from the county in the establishment of Meymeh and Vazvan County and renamed the Central District. The new county was divided into two districts of two rural districts each, with the city of Meymeh as its capital.

== Demographics ==
=== Administrative divisions ===
Laybid District
Administrative Divisions
Muteh RD
Zarkan RD
Laybid (city)
RD = Rural District
