= Saidabad-e Olya, Kerman =

Saidabad-e Olya سعيدابادعليا
- Village
- Location within Iran
- Coordinates: 28°13′44″N 57°28′07″E
- Country: Iran
- Province: Kerman
- County: Anbarabad
- Bakhsh: Esmaili
- Rural District: Esmaili

Population (2006)
  - Total: 125
- Time zone: UTC+3:30 (IRST)
  - Summer (DST): UTC+4:30 (IRDT)

Saidabad-e Olya (Persian: سعيدابادعليا, also Romanized as Sa‘īdābād-e ‘Olya; also known as Seyyedābād-e Bālā) is a village in Esmaili Rural District, Esmaili District, Anbarabad County, Kerman Province, Iran. At the 2006 census, its population was 125, in 30 families.
