= Kalateh-ye Seyyed Ali, South Khorasan =

Kalateh-ye Seyyed Ali كلاته سيدعلي
- Village
- Location within Iran
- Coordinates: 31°37′29″N 60°01′01″E
- Country: Iran
- Province: South Khorasan
- County: Nehbandan
- Bakhsh: Central
- Rural District: Neh

Population (2006)
  - Total: 336
- Time zone: UTC+3:30 (IRST)
  - Summer (DST): UTC+4:30 (IRDT)

Kalateh-ye Seyyed Ali (Persian: كلاته سيدعلي, also Romanized as Kalāteh-ye Seyyed ‘Alī and Kalāteh Saiyid ‘Ali; also known as Sa‘īdābād and Seyyed ‘Alī) is a village in Neh Rural District, in the Central District of Nehbandan County, South Khorasan Province, Iran. At the 2006 census, its population was 336, in 96 families.
