= Saidabad, Razmavaran =

Saidabad سعيداباد
- Village
- Location within Iran
- Coordinates: 30°27′52″N 55°55′31″E
- Country: Iran
- Province: Kerman
- County: Rafsanjan
- Bakhsh: Central
- Rural District: Razmavaran

Population (2006)
  - Total: 407
- Time zone: UTC+3:30 (IRST)
  - Summer (DST): UTC+4:30 (IRDT)

Saidabad (Persian: سعيداباد, also Romanized as Sa‘īdābād; also known as Seyyedābād) is a village in Razmavaran Rural District, in the Central District of Rafsanjan County, Kerman Province, Iran. At the 2006 census, its population was 407, in 99 families.
