= Deyhuk Rural District =

Rural district in South Khorasan province, Iran

Deyhuk Rural District Persian: دهستان ديهوك
- Rural District
- Location within Iran
- Coordinates: 32°57′N 57°07′E
- Country: Iran
- Province: South Khorasan
- County: Tabas
- District: Deyhuk
- Established: 1986
- Capital: Deyhuk

Population (2016)
  - Total: 2,793
- Time zone: UTC+3:30 (IRST)

Deyhuk Rural District (Persian: دهستان ديهوك) is in Deyhuk District of Tabas County, South Khorasan province, Iran. It is administered from the city of Deyhuk.

== Demographics ==
=== Population ===
At the time of the 2006 National Census, the rural district's population (as a part of Yazd province) was 1,926 in 526 households. There were 2,502 inhabitants in 627 households at the following census of 2011. The 2016 census measured the population of the rural district as 2,793 in 680 households, by which time the county had been separated from the province to join South Khorasan province. The most populous of its 56 villages was Esfahak, with 763 people.

=== Other villages in the rural district ===
- Amirabad
- Chiruk
- Emamzadeh Ali
- Mavdar
- Peykuh
- Sorond
