= Seyyedabad, Hormozgan =

Seyyedabad سيداباد
- Village
- Location within Iran
- Coordinates: 27°27′01″N 56°44′02″E
- Country: Iran
- Province: Hormozgan
- County: Bandar Abbas
- Bakhsh: Takht
- Rural District: Shamil

Population (2006)
  - Total: 308
- Time zone: UTC+3:30 (IRST)
  - Summer (DST): UTC+4:30 (IRDT)

Seyyedabad (Persian: سيداباد, also Romanized as Seyyedābād; also known as Sa‘īdābād and Seyyedābādeh) is a village in Shamil Rural District, Takht District, Bandar Abbas County, Hormozgan Province, Iran. At the 2006 census, its population was 308, in 75 families.
