= Kavir Rural District (Tabas County) =

Rural district in South Khorasan province, Iran

Kavir Rural District Persian: دهستان كوير
- Rural District
- Location within Iran
- Coordinates: 32°26′N 57°22′E
- Country: Iran
- Province: South Khorasan
- County: Tabas
- District: Deyhuk
- Established: 1986
- Capital: Zanughan

Population (2016)
  - Total: 4,082
- Time zone: UTC+3:30 (IRST)

Kavir Rural District (Persian: دهستان كوير) is in Deyhuk District of Tabas County, South Khorasan province, Iran. Its capital is the village of Zanughan.

== Demographics ==
=== Population ===
At the time of the 2006 National Census, the rural district's population (as a part of Yazd province) was 3,507 in 1,011 households. There were 4,415 inhabitants in 1,242 households at the following census of 2011. The 2016 census measured the population of the rural district as 4,082 in 1,305 households, by which time the county had been separated from the province to join South Khorasan province. The most populous of its 57 villages was Esfandiar, with 1,289 people.

=== Other villages in the rural district ===
- Arababad
- Deh Now
- Esmailabad
- Marghub
- Nay Band
- Zardgah
