= Saidabad, Sari =

Saidabad سعيدآباد
- Village
- Location within Iran
- Coordinates: 36°37′57″N 53°05′14″E
- Country: Iran
- Province: Mazandaran
- County: Sari
- Bakhsh: Rudpey
- Rural District: Rudpey-ye Sharqi

Population (2016)
  - Total: 260
- Time zone: UTC+3:30 (IRST)

Saidabad (Persian: سعيدآباد, also Romanized as Sā‘īdābād and Seyyedābād) is a village in Rudpey-ye Sharqi Rural District, in the Rudpey District of Sari County, Mazandaran Province, Iran. At the 2016 census, its population was 260, in 84 families. Up from 254 in 2006.
