= Saidabad-e Sofla, Kerman =

Saidabad-e Sofla سعيدابادسفلي
- Village
- Location within Iran
- Coordinates: 28°11′39″N 57°28′28″E
- Country: Iran
- Province: Kerman
- County: Anbarabad
- Bakhsh: Esmaili
- Rural District: Esmaili

Population (2006)
  - Total: 185
- Time zone: UTC+3:30 (IRST)
  - Summer (DST): UTC+4:30 (IRDT)

Saidabad-e Sofla (Persian: سعيدابادسفلي, also Romanized as Sa‘īdābād-e Soflā; also known as Sa‘īdābād, Saiyidābād, Seyyedābād, and Seyyedābād-e Pā’īn) is a village in Esmaili Rural District, Esmaili District, Anbarabad County, Kerman Province, Iran. At the 2006 census, its population was 185, in 35 families.
