= Zarkan Rural District =

Rural district in Isfahan province, Iran

Zarkan Rural District Persian: دهستان زركان
- Rural District
- Location within Iran
- Coordinates: 33°24′27″N 50°48′40″E
- Country: Iran
- Province: Isfahan
- County: Meymeh and Vazvan
- District: Laybid
- Established: 1987
- Capital: Hasan Robat-e Pain

Population (2016)
  - Total: 3,017
- Time zone: UTC+3:30 (IRST)

Zarkan Rural District (Persian: دهستان زركان) is in Laybid District of Meymeh and Vazvan County, Isfahan province, Iran. Its capital is the village of Hasan Robat-e Pain.

== Demographics ==
=== Population ===
At the time of the 2006 National Census, the rural district's population (as a part of Meymeh District (Note: Renamed the Central District of Meymeh and Vazvan County) in Borkhar and Meymeh County) was 5,341 in 1,331 households. There were 2,895 inhabitants in 911 households at the following census of 2011, by which time the district had been separated from the county in the establishment of Shahin Shahr and Meymeh County. (Note: Renamed Shahinshahr County) The 2016 census measured the population of the rural district as 3,017 in 997 households. The most populous of its 26 villages was Hasan Robat-e Pain, with 1,700 people.

In 2024, the district was separated from the county in the establishment of Meymeh and Vazvan County and renamed the Central District. The rural district was transferred to the new Laybid District.

=== Other villages in the rural district ===
- Lushab
