= Kaseliyan Rural District =

Rural district in Mazandaran province, Iran

Kaseliyan Rural District Persian: دهستان كسليان
- Rural District
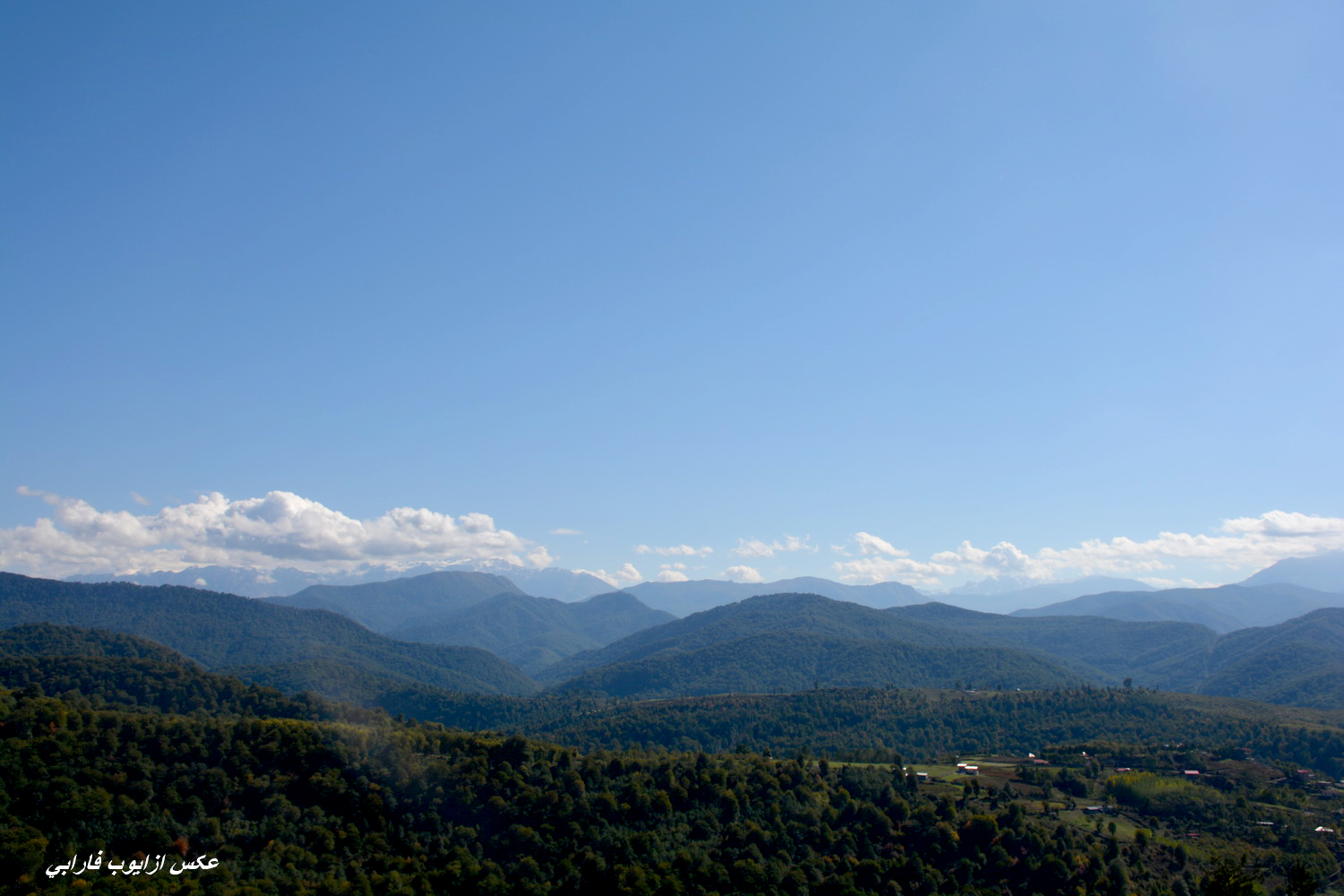
- Landscape in Kaseliyan Rural District

- Location within Iran
- Coordinates: 36°15′N 53°03′E
- Country: Iran
- Province: Mazandaran
- County: Savadkuh
- District: Zirab
- Established: 1993
- Capital: Atu

Population (2016)
  - Total: 4,217
- Time zone: UTC+3:30 (IRST)

Kaseliyan Rural District (Persian: دهستان كسليان) is in Zirab District of Savadkuh County, Mazandaran province, Iran. Its capital is the village of Atu.

== Demographics ==
=== Population ===
At the time of the 2006 National Census, the rural district's population (as a part of the Central District) was 3,872 in 927 households. There were 4,064 inhabitants living in 1,242 households at the following census of 2011. The 2016 census measured the population of the rural district as 4,217 in 1,466 households, by which time it had been separated from the district in the formation of Zirab District. The most populous of its 16 villages was Lajim, with 578 people.

=== Other villages in the rural district ===
- Bahmanan
- Kochid
- Lowlak-e Kaseliyan
- Lowlak-e Lobivar
- Mateh Kola
- Pasha Kola
- Sang Nisht
- Si Pey
