= Meymeh and Vazvan County =

County in Isfahan province, Iran

Meymeh and Vazvan County Persian: شهرستان میمه و وزوان
- County
- Location of Meymeh and Vazvan County in Isfahan province (top left, yellow)

- Location of Isfahan province in Iran
- Coordinates: 33°27′05″N 51°03′23″E
- Country: Iran
- Province: Isfahan
- Established: 2024
- Capital: Meymeh
- Districts: Central, Laybid
- Time zone: UTC+3:30 (IRST)

Meymeh County (Persian: شهرستان میمه و وزوان) is in Isfahan province, Iran. Its capital is the city of Meymeh, whose population at the time of the 2016 National Census was 5,651 people in 1,909 households.

== History ==
In 2007, Borkhar and Meymeh County was divided into Borkhar County and Shahinshahr and Meymeh County, (Note: Renamed Shahinshahr County) the latter of which was divided into two districts of two rural districts each, with Shahinshahr as its capital. In 2024, Meymeh District (Note: Renamed the Central District of Meymeh and Vazvan County) was separated from the county in the establishment of Meymeh and Vazvan County and renamed the Central District. The new county was divided into two districts of two rural districts each, with Meymeh as its capital.

== Demographics ==
=== Administrative divisions ===
Meymeh and Vazvan County's administrative structure is shown in the following table.

Meymeh and Vazvan County
Administrative Divisions
Central District (Note: Formerly Meymeh District of Shahinshahr County)
Azan RD
Vandadeh RD
Meymeh (city)
Vazvan (city)
Laybid District
Muteh RD
Zarkan RD
Laybid (city)
RD = Rural District
