= Central District (Meymeh and Vazvan County) =

District in Isfahan province, Iran

Central District (Meymeh and Vazvan County) Persian: بخش مرکزی شهرستان میمه و وزوان
- District
- Location within Iran
- Coordinates: 33°28′N 51°11′E
- Country: Iran
- Province: Isfahan
- County: Meymeh and Vazvan
- Capital: Vazvan

Population (2016)
  - Total: 23,057 (Note: As Meymeh District of Shahinshahr County)
- Time zone: UTC+3:30 (IRST)

The Central District of Meymeh and Vazvan County (Persian: بخش مرکزی شهرستان میمه و وزوان) (Note: Formerly Meymeh District (بخش میمه) of Shahinshahr County) is in Isfahan province, Iran. Its capital is the city of Vazvan. The previous capital of the district was the city of Meymeh.

== History ==
In 2007, Borkhar and Meymeh County was divided into Borkhar County and Shahinshahr and Meymeh County, (Note: Renamed Shahinshahr County) the latter of which was divided into two districts of two rural districts each, with Shahinshahr as its capital. In 2024, Meymeh District (Note: Renamed the Central District of Meymeh and Vazvan County) was separated from the county in the establishment of Meymeh and Vazvan County and renamed the Central District. The new county was divided into two districts of two rural districts each, with the city of Meymeh as its capital.

== Demographics ==
=== Population ===
At the time of the 2006 National Census, the district's population (as Meymeh District of Shahinshahr County) was 21,491 in 6,286 households. The following census in 2011 counted 20,698 people in 6,533 households. The 2016 census measured the population of the district as 23,057 inhabitants in 7,641 households.

=== Administrative divisions ===
Central District (Meymeh and Vazvan County) (Note: As Meymeh District of Shahinshahr County at the 2006, 2011, and 2016 censuses)
Administrative Divisions	2006	2011	2016
Azan RD (Note: Established after the 2016 census)			
Vandadeh RD	5,756	6,322	6,605
Zarkan RD (Note: Transferred to Laybid District after the 2016 census)	5,341	2,895	3,017
Laybid (city)		1,473	1,832
Meymeh (city)	5,733	5,449	5,651
Vazvan (city)	4,661	4,559	5,952
Total	21,491	20,698	23,057
RD = Rural District
