= Deyhuk District =

District in South Khorasan province, Iran

Deyhuk District Persian: بخش دیهوک
- District
- Location within Iran
- Coordinates: 32°41′N 57°19′E
- Country: Iran
- Province: South Khorasan
- County: Tabas
- Established: 2003
- Capital: Deyhuk

Population (2016)
  - Total: 9,834
- Time zone: UTC+3:30 (IRST)

Deyhuk District (Persian: بخش دیهوک) is in Tabas County, South Khorasan province, Iran. The capital of the district is the city of Deyhuk.

== History ==
Tabas County was part of Yazd province from 2001 until it was transferred to South Khorasan province in 2013.

== Demographics ==
=== Population ===
According to the 2006 National Census, the district's population was 8,200, comprising 2,303 households, when it was in Yazd province. The 2011 census recorded 10,263 people across 2,759 households. By the 2016 census, the population had decreased to 9,834 inhabitants in 2,854 households, at which time the county had been transferred to South Khorasan province.

=== Administrative divisions ===
Deyhuk District Population (Note: As a part of Yazd province at the 2006 and 2011 censuses)
Administrative Divisions	2006	2011	2016
Deyhuk RD	1,926	2,502	2,793
Kavir RD	3,507	4,415	4,082
Deyhuk (city)	2,767	3,346	2,959
Total	8,200	10,263	9,834
RD = Rural District
