= Zirab District =

District in Mazandaran province, Iran

Zirab District Persian: بخش زیرآب
- District
- Location within Iran
- Coordinates: 36°15′N 53°01′E
- Country: Iran
- Province: Mazandaran
- County: Savadkuh
- Established: 2012
- Capital: Zirab

Population (2016)
  - Total: 21,376
- Time zone: UTC+3:30 (IRST)

Zirab District (Persian: بخش زیرآب) is in Savadkuh County, Mazandaran province, Iran. Its capital is the city of Zirab.

== History ==
In 2012, Kaseliyan and Sorkhkola Rural Districts, and the city of Zirab, were separated from the Central District in the formation of Zirab District.

== Demographics ==
=== Population ===
At the time of the 2016 National Census, the district's population was 21,376 inhabitants in 7,125 households.

=== Administrative divisions ===
Zirab District Population
Administrative Divisions	2016
Kaseliyan RD	4,217
Sorkhkola RD	968
Zirab (city)	16,191
Total	21,376
RD = Rural District
