= Borkhar County Mass Transit Organization =

MONOS FF

Borkhar County Mass Transit Organization سازمان حمل و نقل جمعی شهرستان برخوار
- Service area: Borkhar County, Isfahan Province
- Service type: Bus service
- Routes: 7
- Operator: Borkhar County Governorship, Municipalities of Borkhar County Cities

Borkhar County Mass Transit Organization (Persian: سازمان حمل و نقل جمعی شهرستان برخوار) is a public transport agency running Transit buses in Borkhar County, located north of Isfahan, in Greater Isfahan Region, Central Iran. This transit agency has 7 lines, 5 inter-urban, and 2 local. It serves the cities of Dastgerd, Dolatabad, Khorzuq, Habibabad, and Komeshcheh with the inter-urban lines that connect them to Isfahan, and the municipalities of Shadpurabad and Sin, connected to Dolatabad with two local lines.

The county is also served by a line operated by Shahinshahr and Suburbs Bus Organization, connecting Dastgerd, Dolatabad, and Habibabad to Shahinshahr and Gaz.

== Routes ==
Name	Origin	Destination	Connections
Inter-urban lines
Khorzuq- Isfahan	Dashgerd Square	Baboldasht Terminal	Isfahan Metro Line 1 BRT Line 2
Dastgerd - Isfahan	Dashgerd Terminal (Rajaei St)	Baboldasht Terminal	Isfahan Metro Line 1 BRT Line 2
Dolatabad - Isfahan	Mohsenabad	Bagh-e-Ghoushkhane Terminal	BRT Line 1
Habibabad - Isfahan	Habibabad	Bagh-e-Ghoushkhane Terminal	BRT Line 1
Komeshcheh - Isfahan	Komeshcheh	Bagh-e-Ghoushkhane Terminal	BRT Line 1
Local lines
Sin - Dolatabad	Sin	Enghelab Square, Dolatabad	
Shapurabad - Dolatabad	Shapurabad	Enghelab Square, Dolatabad	
Shahinshahr Line
Shahinshahr-Habibabad	Hafez Terminal	Habibabad	
