= Isfahan and Suburbs Bus Company =

Iranian bus operator

Isfahan and Suburbs Bus Company شرکت واحد اتوبوسراني اصفهان و حومه
- Founded: October 26, 1967
- Headquarters: Next to Baboldasht Terminal, Kaveh Boulevard, Isfahan
- Service area: Isfahan, Baharestan, Dastgerd, Gaz, Dolatabad, Habibabad, Komeshcheh, Qahjavarestan; Dorcheh, Khomeynishahr; Isfahan Province
- Service type: Bus service
- Routes: 1 BRT Route; Formerly 2, lines merged 94 Bus Routes
- Stops: 1600
- Fleet: 1400 buses
- Daily ridership: 950,000 passengers per day
- Operator: Isfahan Municipality
- Chief executive: Seyed Abbas Rouhani Esfahani
- Website: ica.isfahan.ir

Isfahan and Suburbs Bus Company (Persian: شرکت واحد اتوبوسراني اصفهان و حومه) is a public transport agency running Transit buses in Isfahan city and surrounding satellite cities and settlements in the Greater Isfahan Region, Central Iran. The municipalities served other than Isfahan are: Abrisham, Baharestan, Dastgerd, Dolatabad, Dorcheh, Gaz, Habibabad, Khomeynishahr, Komeshcheh, and Qahjavarestan. The organization was founded on October 26, 1967 with an initial capital of 39'100'000 Rials (Equivalent to 54'768'540'300 Rials in 2013, 1'738'680 US Dollars in 2013, 245'453 US Dollars in 1967)

It sends 60 buses to Iraqi border every year for a one-month pilgrim parade.

== Fleet ==
Buses used are mostly manufactured by Iran Khodro Diesel. The oldest model active in the fleet is IKD O457 City Bus. These buses were later upgraded to be able to use CNG fuel, becoming the model IKD CNG City Bus O457G-OSG. Esfahan also utilizes Shahab Khodro Renault Eurobuses. Also the higher capacity MEGATRANS City Bus is also used in the fleet. Recent buses entering the fleet are Oghab Scania-3112 models.

Buses utilized in BRT lines, are 2 cabins, and are SNA X-MOB 18001 and XMQ6180G1 models.

== Smart Card ==
The first time a smart card system was used on Isfahan buses was in summer 2010, with studies done over the summer and the contractor chosen over the fall of 2009. The system was reorganized with the creation of ESCard in summer 2012.

== Routes ==
=== BRT ===
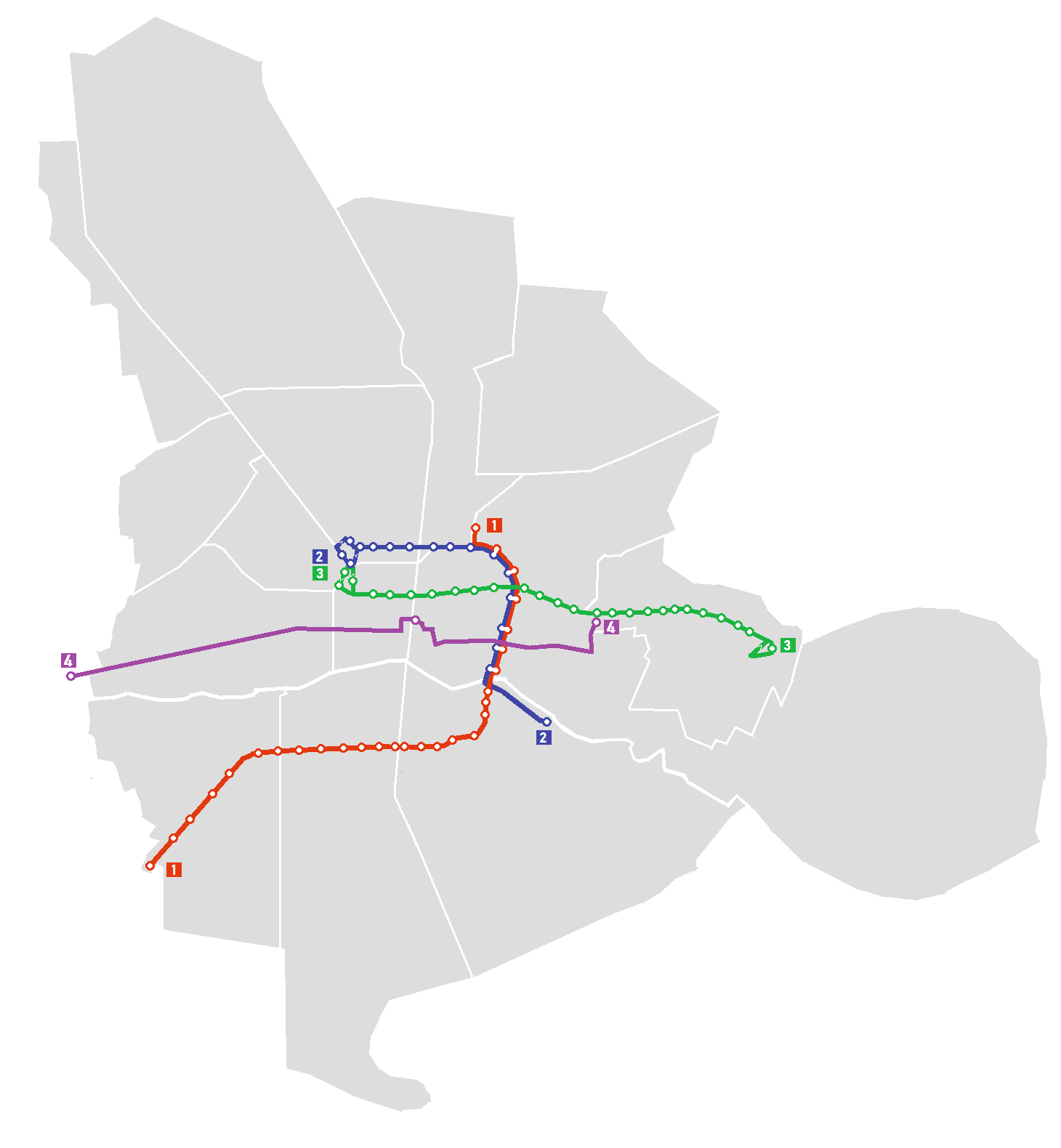
Map of the BRT system

BRT's ridership at summer of 2015 is 120'000 per day.

| Line | First Terminus | Second Terminus | Length (km) | Stations From 1st to 2nd Terminus | Stations From 2nd to 1st Terminus |
|---|---|---|---|---|---|
| BRT1 | Bagh-e-Ghoushkhane Terminal | Yazdabad Bridge | 19 | 32 | 32 |
| BRT2 | Bozorgmehr Bridge | Jomhuri Square | | | |
| BRT3 | Arghavanieh Terminal | Khorram Terminal | | | |
| BRT4 | Jey Bus Terminal | Dorcheh Jct. | | | |

==== Formerly ====
Before September 15, 2014, There were two BRT bus routes. On that date, these routes were merged to create one continuous route.

| Line | First Terminus | Second Terminus | Length (km) | Stations From 1st to 2nd Terminus | Stations From 2nd to 1st Terminus |
|---|---|---|---|---|---|
| BRT1 | Azadi Square (Isfahan) | Yazdabad Bridge | 9 | 14 | 14 |
| BRT2; Replaced Route 6 | Bagh-e-Ghoushkhane Terminal | Azadi Square (Isfahan) | 10 | 19 | 19 |

=== Normal Routes ===
| Line | Logo | First Terminus | Second Terminus | Length (km) | Stations From 1st to 2nd Terminus | Stations From 2nd to 1st Terminus | Weekday Frequency (min) | Friday and Holiday Frequency (min) |
|---|---|---|---|---|---|---|---|---|
| Line 1 | | Bozorgmehr Bridge | Zeynabieh-Darak | 14 | 37 | 37 | 5 | 15 |
| Line 2 | | Enqelab Square, Dolatabad | Sinabad | | | | | |
| Line 3 | | Enqelab Square, Dolatabad | Shahrabad | | | | | |
| Line 4 | | Qods Square | Garkan | 5 | 18 | 18 | 10 | 25 |
| Line 5 | | Qods Square | Hasseh | 8 | 22 | 22 | 10 | 25 |
| Line 7 | | Baboldasht Terminal | Dr. Gharazi Hospital | 8 | 24 | 20 | 12 | 30 |
| Line 9 | | Jomhuri-ye Eslami Square | Enqelab Square | 5 | 12 | 12 | 9 | 25 |
| Line 10 | | Bagh-e-Ghoushkhane Terminal | Enqelab Square | 5 | 13 | 12 | 6 | 18 |
| Line 11 | | Bagh-e-Ghoushkhane Terminal | Dolatabal | | | 6 | 15 | |
| Line 12 | | Jomhuri-ye Eslami Square | Kesareh | 3 | 5 | 4 | 40 | No; Service |
| Line 13 | | Qods Square | Qahjavarestan | 15 | | | | |
| Line 14 | | Azadi Square; Formerly Hotel Pol | Kuy-e Bahar | 6; 9 | 14; 20 | 12; 20 | | |
| Line 16 | | Malekshahr Jct. | Zayanderud Terminal | 13 | 32 | 31 | 10 | 20 |
| Line 17 | | Jomhuri-ye Eslami Square | Bagh-e-Ghoushkhane Terminal | 10 | 27 | 25 | 10 | 30 |
| Line 18 | | Jomhuri-ye Eslami Square | Veldan | 4 | 12 | 12 | 60 | No; Service |
| Line 19 | | Jomhuri-ye Eslami Square | Mahdieh | 9 | 21 | 22 | 40 | No; Service |
| Line 20 | | Bagh-e-Ghoushkhane Terminal | Malekshahr | 11 | 26 | 27 | 12 | 30 |
| Line 21 | | Jomhuri-ye Eslami Square | Esteqlal Square | 11 | 23 | 23 | | |
| Line 22 | | Khorram Terminal | Janbazan | 21 | 23 | 21 | 12 | 25 |
| Line 23 | | Khorram Terminal | Enqelab Square | 5 | 14 | 14 | 6 | 15 |
| Line 24 | | Jomhuri-ye Eslami Square | Negin | 14 | 32 | 32 | 8 | 20 |
| Line 25 | | Khorram Terminal | Rehnan | 7 | 21 | 21 | 10 | 25 |
| Line 26 | | Sheykh Bahaei | Dorcheh Jct. | 10 | 24 | 24 | 4 | 10 |
| Line 27 | | Jomhuri-ye Eslami Square | Kaveh Terminal | 6 | 14 | 14 | 12 | 30 |
| Line 28 | | Khorasgan Terminal | Shiri Bridge | 14 | 38 | 33 | 5 | 15 |
| Line 29 | | Bozorgmehr Bridge | Islamic Azad University of Khorasgan | 12 | 21 | 21 | 10 | 25 |
| Line 30 | | Jomhuri-ye Eslami Square | Shahrak-e Shahid Montazeri | 16 | 30 | 30 | 16 | 30 |
| Line 31 | | Zayanderud Terminal | Abshar Terminal | 11 | 24 | 27 | 10 | 25 |
| Line 32 | | Hotel Pol | Soffeh Terminal | 7 | 14 | 16 | | |
| Line 33 | | Qa'emieh Square | Shahid Abbaspur Power Plant | 4 | 9 | 9 | | |
| Line 34 | | Jomhuri-ye Eslami Square | Azadi Square | 7 | 21 | 21 | 3 | 10 |
| Line 35 | | Imam Hosein Square | Azadi Square | 7 | 17 | 17 | | |
| Line 36 | | Soffeh Terminal; Formerly Hotel Pol | Kuy-e Emam | 3; 7 | 4; 16 | 5; 16 | | |
| Line 37 | | Azadi Square | Isfahan Railway Station | 11 | 18 | 18 | 15 | 30 |
| Line 38 | | Jomhuri-ye Eslami Square | Darvishi | 3 | 10 | 9 | 5 | 25 |
| Line 39 | | Qa'emieh Square | Kuy-e Amirieh | 4 | 16 | 5 | 5 | 15 |
| Line 40 | | Hotel Pol | Kuy-e Amirieh | 11 | 29 | 24 | 10 | 25 |
| Line 41 | | Tayyeb St. | Juyabad | 12 | 22 | 25 | 10 | 25 |
| Line 42 | | Imam Hosein Square | Jey Terminal | 7 | 23 | 23 | 5 | 15 |
| Line 43 | | Imam Hosein Square | Laleh Square | 9 | 26 | 26 | 6 | 20 |
| Line 44 | | Bagh-e-Ghoushkhane Terminal | Isfahan Airport | 23 | | | | |
| Line 45 | | Ahmadabad Square | Rehnan | 11 | 17 | 20 | 10 | 20 |
| Line 46 | | Qa'emieh Square | Qa'emieh | 4 | 12 | 12 | 5 | 20 |
| Line 47 | | Imam Ali Square | Azarbeigi Square | 7 | 21 | 25 | 10 | 25 |
| Line 48 | | Jey Terminal | Baraan-e Shomali | 32 | | | | |
| Line 49 | | Jomhuri-ye Eslami Square | Rehnan | 9 | 14 | 14 | 15 | 30 |
| Line 50 | | Jomhuri-ye Eslami Square | Asheghabad | 8 | 20 | 20 | 20 | 40 |
| Line 51 | | Jomhuri-ye Eslami Square | Shahrak-e Kowsar | 9 | 18 | 18 | 20 | 40 |
| Line 52 | | Imam Ali Square | Garkan | 10 | 24 | 26 | 15 | 30 |
| Line 53 | | Imam Ali Square | Kerdabad | 7 | 20 | 22 | 20 | No; Service |
| Line 54 | | Hotel Pol | Baharestan | 25 | | | 5 | 10 |
| Line 55; Run by Baharestan Municipality | | Azadi Square | Baharestan | 22 | | | | |
| Line 57 | | Jomhuri-ye Eslami Square | Zeynabieh-Darak | 11 | 29 | 30 | 12 | 30 |
| Line 58 | | Jomhuri-ye Eslami Square | Babukan | 8 | 20 | 18 | 25 | No; Service |
| Line 59 | | Baboldasht Terminal | Dastgerd | | | | | |
| Line 60 | | Jomhuri-ye Eslami Square | Kujan | 5 | 13 | 13 | 20 | 30 |
| Line 61 | | Soffeh Terminal; Formerly Hotel Pol | Kuy-e Emam Sadegh | 2; 8 | 5; 16 | 4; 19 | | |
| Line 62 | | Soffeh Terminal; Formerly Hotel Pol | Kuy-e Sepahan | 2; 9 | 3; 15 | 3; 17 | | |
| Line 63 | | Imam Hosein Square | University of Isfahan | 7 | 15 | 14 | 8 | 20 |
| Line 65 | | Bagh-e-Ghoushkhane Terminal | Abshar Terminal | 6 | 11 | 11 | 10 | 20 |
| Line 66 | | Qa'emieh Square | Dorcheh Piaz | | | | | |
| Line 67 | | Jomhuri-ye Eslami Square | Isfahan University of Technology | 18 | 29 | 27 | 15 | 30 |
| Line 68 | | Hasht Behesht | Khorasgan Terminal | 11 | 29 | 29 | 7 | 15 |
| Line 70 | | Baboldasht Terminal | Golestan St. | 8 | 17 | 22 | 12 | 25 |
| Line 71 | | Imam Ali Square | Arghavanieh | 15 | 38 | 38 | 12 | 30 |
| Line 72 | | Zayanderud Terminal | Kuy-e Vali-e Asr | 7 | 16 | 14 | 10 | 30 |
| Line 73 | | Khorasgan Terminal | Gavart | 8 | 17 | 17 | 30 | No; Service |
| Line 74 | | Shiri Bridge | Behesht St. | 9 | 23 | 16 | 15 | No; Service |
| Line 75 | | Vafaei Jct.-7th Moharram | Dorcheh Jct. | 9 | 26 | 32 | 15 | 30 |
| Line 76 | | Azadi Square | Sepahanshahr-Shahed Blvd. | 13 | 22 | 20 | 3 | 10 |
| Line 77 | | Jomhuri-ye Eslami Square | Shahrak-e Azadegan | 11 | 28 | 28 | 10 | 25 |
| Line 78 | | Imam Hossein Sq. | Shahrak-e Vali-e Asr | 10 | 19 | 19 | 10 | 25 |
| Line 79 | | Enqelab Square | Kazemi-Mofatteh jct. | 8 | 18 | 18 | 15 | 30 |
| Line 80 | | Malekshahr Jct. | Soffeh Terminal | 27 | 31 | 31 | 18 | 30 |
| Line 81 | | Baboldasht Terminal | Barazandeh St. | 7 | 16 | 16 | 10 | 20 |
| Line 82 | | Malekshahr Jct. | Esteqlal Blvd. | 17 | 28 | 28 | 20 | 30 |
| Line 83 | | Kaveh Terminal | Bozorgmehr Bridge | 17 | 28 | 28 | 15 | 30 |
| Line 84 | | Abshar Terminal | Radan-Fizudan | 6 | 7 | 7 | 60 | No; Service |
| Line 85 | | Tayyeb St. | Shahrak-e Negin | 13 | 30 | 33 | 15 | 30 |
| Line 86 | | Azadi Square | Sepahanshahr-Ghadir Blvd. | 14 | 21 | 21 | 3 | 10 |
| Line 88 | | Jomhuri-ye Eslami Square | Ata-ol-Molk St | 11 | 22 | 22 | 60 | No; Service |
| Line 90 | | Bozorgmehr Bridge | Rowshanshahr | 9 | 18 | 18 | 30 | No; Service |
| Line 91 | | Soffeh Terminal | Malekshahr Amusement park | 20 | 47 | 47 | 3 | 10 |
| Line 92 | | Hasht Behesht | Khaneh Esfahan | 15 | 32 | 33 | 8 | 20 |
| Line 93 | | Khorram Terminal | Khorasgan Terminal | 14 | 29 | 30 | 15 | 30 |
| Line 94 | | Janbazan Blvd. | Alikhani Square (Malekshahr) | 18 | 29 | 29 | 10 | 20 |
| Line 95 | | Esteqlal Square | Mahmudabad | 6 | 8 | 7 | 30 | No; Service |
| Line 96 | | Abshar Terminal | Denarat | 5 | 7 | 8 | 15 | 30 |
| Line 97 | | Abshar Terminal | Shahrak-e Shahid Keshvari | 6 | 6 | 4 | 15 | 30 |
| Line 101 | | Bagh-e-Ghoushkhane Terminal | Habibabad | | | | | |
| Line 102 | | Bagh-e-Ghoushkhane Terminal | Komeshcheh | | | | | |
| Line 103 | | Abshar Terminal | Esfahanak | 9 | | | | |
| Line 104; Parallel to Falavarjan Line 4 | | Qa'emieh Square | Abrisham | | | | | |
| Line 105 | | Abshar Terminal | Ziar | 34 | | | | |

=== Night Routes ===
These routes are active from 20:30 to 23:00 daily. Currently there are 15 active night routes, plus the BRT route

| Line | Logo | First Terminus | Second Terminus | Length (km) | Stations From 1st to 2nd Terminus | Stations From 2nd to 1st Terminus |
|---|---|---|---|---|---|---|
| Line 1 | | Bozorgmehr Bridge | Zeynabieh-Darak | 14 | 37 | 37 |
| Line 9 | | Jomhuri-ye Eslami Square | Enqelab Square | 5 | 12 | 12 |
| Line 10 | | Bagh-e-Ghoushkhane Terminal | Enqelab Square | 5 | 13 | 12 |
| Line 25 | | Khorram Terminal | Rehnan | 7 | 21 | 21 |
| Line 26 | | Sheykh Bahaei | Dorcheh Jct. | 10 | 24 | 24 |
| Line 28 | | Khorasgan Terminal | Shiri Bridge | 14 | 38 | 33 |
| Line 34 | | Jomhuri-ye Eslami Square | Azadi Square | 7 | 21 | 21 |
| Line 42 | | Hotel Pol | Kuy-e Amirieh | 11 | 29 | 24 |
| Line 43 | | Imam Hosein Square | Laleh Square | 9 | 26 | 26 |
| Line 57 | | Jomhuri-ye Eslami Square | Zeynabieh-Darak | 11 | 29 | 30 |
| Line 79 | | Enqelab Square | Kazemi-Mofatteh jct. | 8 | 18 | 18 |
| Line 91 | | Soffeh Terminal | Malekshahr Amusement park | 20 | 47 | 47 |
| Line 92 | | Hasht Behesht | Khaneh Esfahan | 15 | 32 | 33 |
| Line 93 | | Khorram Terminal | Khorasgan Terminal | 14 | 29 | 30 |
| Line 94 | | Janbazan Blvd. | Alikhani Square (Malekshahr) | 18 | 29 | 29 |
