= Shahinshahr and Suburbs Bus Organization =

Shahinshahr and Suburbs Bus Organization سازمان اتوبوسرانی شهرداری شاهین شهر و حومه
- Service area: Shahinshahr, Gorgab, and Gaz, Shahin Shahr and Meymeh County, Isfahan Province
- Service type: Bus service
- Routes: 14
- Hubs: Hafez Bus terminal
- Operator: Shahinshar Municipality
- Website: سازمان اتوبوسرانی شهرداری شاهین شهر و حومه

Shahnshahr and Suburbs Bus Organization (Persian: سازمان اتوبوسرانی شهرداری شاهین شهر و حومه) is a public transport agency running Transit buses in Shahinshahr and Gaz, Shahin Shahr and Meymeh County, located north of Isfahan, in Greater Isfahan Region, Central Iran.

== Routes ==
Route #	Name	Origin	Destination	Average headway (min)	One way travel time (min)
1	Isfahan-Site	Hafez Terminal	Baboldasht Terminal	6	55
2	Goldis 1	Hafez Terminal	Shahrak-e Goldis	7	38
3	Habibabad	Hafez Terminal	Habibabad	30	60
4	Maskan-e Mehr 1	Hafez Terminal	Maskan-e Mehr, Pardis	7	35
5	Gorgab	Hafez Terminal	Gorgab	20	30
6	HESA	Hafez Terminal	HESA	30	30
7	Khane-ye Kargar	Hafez Terminal	Khane-ye Kargar	10	30
8	Kuy-e Mahdiyeh	Hafez Terminal	Kuy-e Mahdiyeh	15	37
9	Gaz-Isfahan	Gaz	Baboldasht Terminal	15	45
10	Goldis 2	Hafez Terminal	Shahrak-e Goldis	12	42
11	Radanipur	Hafez Terminal	Shahrak-e Radanipur	20	20
12	Isfahan-Bank-e Ostan	Hafez Terminal	Baboldasht Terminal; Via Mo'allem F'way.	18	54
13	Gaz-Shahinshahr	Hafez Terminal	Gaz	60	30
14	Shahrak-e Milad	Hafez Terminal	Shahrak-e Milad	30	30
15	Maskan-e Mehr 2	Hafez Terminal	Maskan-e Mehr	26	39
