= Bideshak =

Bideshak or Bidashk or Bideshk or Bide Shak (Persian: بيدشك) may refer to:

- Bideshk, Ardestan, Isfahan Province
- Bideshk, Shahin Shahr and Meymeh, Isfahan Province
- Bideshak, Khabar, Baft County, Kerman Province
- Bideshk, Kiskan, Baft County, Kerman Province
- Bideshk, Jiroft, Kerman Province
