= Borkhar =

Borkhar (Persian: برخوار) may refer to:

- Borkhar County
- Borkhar-e Gharbi Rural District
- Borkhar-e Markazi Rural District
- Borkhar-e Sharqi Rural District
