= Parvaneh, Isfahan =

Village in Isfahan province, Iran

Parvaneh Persian: پروانه
- Village
- Location within Iran
- Coordinates: 32°50′05″N 51°55′28″E
- Country: Iran
- Province: Isfahan
- County: Borkhar
- District: Habibabad
- Rural District: Borkhar-e Sharqi

Population (2016)
  - Total: 211
- Time zone: UTC+3:30 (IRST)

Parvaneh (Persian: پروانه) (Note: Also romanized as Parvāneh) is a village in Borkhar-e Sharqi Rural District of Habibabad District in Borkhar County, Isfahan province, Iran.

== Demographics ==
=== Population ===
At the time of the 2006 National Census, the village's population was 202 in 53 households, when it was in the former Borkhar District of Borkhar and Meymeh County. (Note: Renamed Shahinshahr and Meymeh County and again renamed Shahinshahr County) The following census in 2011 counted 194 people in 63 households, by which time the district had been separated from the county in the establishment of Borkhar County. The rural district was transferred to the new Habibabad District. The 2016 census measured the population of the village as 211 people in 70 households.
