= Donbi =

Village in Isfahan province, Iran

Donbi Persian: دنبی
- Village
- Location within Iran
- Coordinates: 33°03′02″N 51°48′00″E
- Country: Iran
- Province: Isfahan
- County: Borkhar
- District: Habibabad
- Rural District: Borkhar-e Sharqi

Population (2016)
  - Total: 117
- Time zone: UTC+3:30 (IRST)

Donbi (Persian: دنبی) (Note: Also romanized as Donbī; also known as Dowmbī and Dumbi) is a village in Borkhar-e Sharqi Rural District of Habibabad District in Borkhar County, Isfahan province, Iran.

== Demographics ==
=== Population ===
At the time of the 2006 National Census, the village's population was 114 in 32 households, when it was in the former Borkhar District of Borkhar and Meymeh County. (Note: Renamed Shahinshahr and Meymeh County and again renamed Shahinshahr County) The following census in 2011 counted 107 people in 40 households, by which time the district had been separated from the county in the establishment of Borkhar County. The rural district was transferred to the new Habibabad District. The 2016 census measured the population of the village as 117 people in 46 households.
