= Aliabad Chi =

Village in Isfahan province, Iran

Aliabad Chi Persian: علي ابادچي
- Village
- Location within Iran
- Coordinates: 32°47′45″N 51°58′25″E
- Country: Iran
- Province: Isfahan
- County: Borkhar
- District: Habibabad
- Rural District: Borkhar-e Sharqi

Population (2016)
  - Total: 159
- Time zone: UTC+3:30 (IRST)

Aliabad Chi (Persian: علي ابادچي) (Note: Also romanized as ‘Alīābād Chī and ‘Alīābādchī) is a village in Borkhar-e Sharqi Rural District of Habibabad District in Borkhar County, Isfahan province, Iran.

== Demographics ==
=== Population ===
At the time of the 2006 National Census, the village's population was 113 in 32 households, when it was in the former Borkhar District of Borkhar and Meymeh County. (Note: Renamed Shahinshahr and Meymeh County and again renamed Shahinshahr County) The following census in 2011 counted 131 people in 40 households, by which time the district had been separated from the county in the establishment of Borkhar County. The rural district was transferred to the new Habibabad District. The 2016 census measured the population of the village as 159 people in 52 households.
