= Shurcheh, Borkhar =

Village in Isfahan province, Iran

Shurcheh Persian: شورچه
- Village
- Location within Iran
- Coordinates: 33°05′41″N 51°51′45″E
- Country: Iran
- Province: Isfahan
- County: Borkhar
- District: Habibabad
- Rural District: Borkhar-e Sharqi

Population (2016)
  - Total: 17
- Time zone: UTC+3:30 (IRST)

Shurcheh (Persian: شورچه) (Note: Also romanized as Shūrcheh) is a village in Borkhar-e Sharqi Rural District of Habibabad District in Borkhar County, Isfahan province, Iran.

== Demographics ==
=== Population ===
At the time of the 2006 National Census, the village's population was 32 in 12 households, when it was in the former Borkhar District of Borkhar and Meymeh County. (Note: Renamed Shahinshahr and Meymeh County and again renamed Shahinshahr County) The following census in 2011 counted 32 people in 13 households, by which time the district had been separated from the county in the establishment of Borkhar County. The rural district was transferred to the new Habibabad District. The 2016 census measured the population of the village as 17 people in nine households.
