= Margh, Borkhar =

Village in Isfahan province, Iran

Margh Persian: مرغ
- Village
- Location within Iran
- Coordinates: 33°04′52″N 51°50′40″E
- Country: Iran
- Province: Isfahan
- County: Borkhar
- District: Habibabad
- Rural District: Borkhar-e Sharqi

Population (2016)
  - Total: 272
- Time zone: UTC+3:30 (IRST)

Margh (Persian: مرغ) (Note: Also romanized as Morgh; also known as Margh-e Kūhestān and Marq) is a village in Borkhar-e Sharqi Rural District of Habibabad District in Borkhar County, Isfahan province, Iran.

== Demographics ==
=== Population ===
At the time of the 2006 National Census, the village's population was 251 in 69 households, when it was in the former Borkhar District of Borkhar and Meymeh County. (Note: Renamed Shahinshahr and Meymeh County and again renamed Shahinshahr County) The following census in 2011 counted 243 people in 79 households, by which time the district had been separated from the county in the establishment of Borkhar County. The rural district was transferred to the new Habibabad District. The 2016 census measured the population of the village as 272 people in 95 households.
