= Aliabad-e Molla Ali =

Village in Isfahan province, Iran

Aliabad-e Molla Ali Persian: علي ابادملاعلي
- Village
- Location within Iran
- Coordinates: 32°48′21″N 51°45′47″E
- Country: Iran
- Province: Isfahan
- County: Borkhar
- District: Habibabad
- Rural District: Borkhar-e Sharqi

Population (2016)
  - Total: 3,312
- Time zone: UTC+3:30 (IRST)

Aliabad-e Molla Ali (Persian: علي ابادملاعلي) (Note: Also romanized as ‘Alīābād-e Mollā ‘Alī; also known as ‘Alīābād and ‘Alīāb-e Mollā ‘Alī) is a village in Borkhar-e Sharqi Rural District of Habibabad District in Borkhar County, Isfahan province, Iran.

== Demographics ==
=== Population ===
At the time of the 2006 National Census, the village's population was 2,702 in 676 households, when it was in the former Borkhar District of Borkhar and Meymeh County. (Note: Renamed Shahinshahr and Meymeh County and again renamed Shahinshahr County) The following census in 2011 counted 2,887 people in 840 households, by which time the district had been separated from the county in the establishment of Borkhar County. The rural district was transferred to the new Habibabad District. The 2016 census measured the population of the village as 3,312 people in 999 households, the most populous in its rural district.
