= Sohra, Iran =

Sohra (Persian: صحرا) in Iran may refer to:

- Sohra Ghazanfariyeh Shomali
- Sohra Heydarabad
- Sohra Khal-e Sefid
- Sohra Kheyrabad

== See also ==
- Sohray (disambiguation), various places in Iran
