= Mohsenabad, Isfahan =

Village in Isfahan province, Iran

Mohsenabad Persian: محسن اباد
- Village
- Location within Iran
- Coordinates: 32°49′39″N 51°42′37″E
- Country: Iran
- Province: Isfahan
- County: Borkhar
- District: Central
- Rural District: Borkhar-e Markazi

Population (2016)
  - Total: 4,217
- Time zone: UTC+3:30 (IRST)

Mohsenabad (Persian: محسن اباد) (Note: Also romanized as Moḩsenābād; also known as Ādarmanāābād, Ādarmanābād, Ādarmonāābād, and Adermanābād) is a village in, and the capital of, Borkhar-e Markazi Rural District in the Central District of Borkhar County, Isfahan province, Iran. The previous capital of the rural district was the village of Shapurabad, now a city. It was the capital of Borkhar-e Sharqi Rural District until its capital was transferred to the village of Komeshcheh, now a city.

== Demographics ==
=== Population ===
At the time of the 2006 National Census, the village's population was 3,074 in 781 households, when it was in the former Borkhar District of Borkhar and Meymeh County. (Note: Renamed Shahinshahr and Meymeh County and again renamed Shahinshahr County) The following census in 2011 counted 3,689 people in 1,093 households, by which time the district had been separated from the county in the establishment of Borkhar County. The rural district was transferred to the new Central District. The 2016 census measured the population of the village as 4,217 people in 1,301 households, the most populous in its rural district.
