= Vehicle registration plates of Isfahan =

Isfahan vehicle license plates

Isfahan's codes are 13, 23, 43 and 53. All letters of 53 are reserved for city of Isfahan and the code is currently in use. In public cars, Taxis and Governal cars the letter is always the same. But in simple cars this letter (ب) depends on the city.

== 13 ==
13 is Isfahan county's code and all of the letters are for Isfahan.

۱۲ ۳۴۵	۱۳

== 23 ==
۱۲ ۳۴۵	۲۳

City	Letter
Kashan	ب
Najafabad	ج
Shahreza; Dehaghan	د
Khomeinishahr	س
Golpayegan	ص
Natanz	ط
Ardestan	ق
Khansar	ل
Nain	م
Semirom	ن
Fereydunshahr	و
Falavarjan	هـ
Lanjan	ى

== 43 ==
۱۲ ۳۴۵	۴۳

City	Letter
Fereydan	ب
Mobarakeh	ج
Shahinshar o Meymeh; Borkhar	د
Aran o Bidgol	س
Tiran o Karun	ص
Chadegan	ط
Shahinshar o Meymeh; Borkhar	ل
Najafabad	م
Khomeynishahr	ن
Kashan	و
Lenjan	هـ
Falavarjan	ی

== 53 ==
This code used to be a reserved code, but it is currently in use. So far, Isfahan County has used 8 of the letters and other codes have been given to other counties.

۱۲ ۳۴۵	۵۳

City	Letter
Isfahan	ب
Isfahan	ج
Isfahan	د
Isfahan	س
Isfahan	ص
Shahreza	ط
Isfahan	ق
Isfahan	ل
Shahin Shahr and Meymeh	م
Najafabad	ن
Isfahan	و
Kashan	ه
