= Murcheh Khvort =

Village in Isfahan province, Iran

Murcheh Khvort Persian: مورچه ‌خورت
- Village
- Location within Iran
- Coordinates: 33°05′23″N 51°28′42″E
- Country: Iran
- Province: Isfahan
- County: Shahinshahr
- District: Central
- Rural District: Murcheh Khvort

Population (2016)
  - Total: 1,369
- Time zone: UTC+3:30 (IRST)

Murcheh Khvort (Persian: مورچه‌خورت) (Note: Also romanized as Mūrcheh Khvort; also known as Morcha-Khūrt, Morcheh Khort, Murcheh Khort, Mūrcheh Khort, Mūrcheh Khūr, and Mūrcheh Khūrd) is a village in, and the capital of, Murcheh Khvort Rural District in the Central District of Shahinshahr County, (Note: Formerly Borkhar and Meymeh County and then renamed Shahinshahr and Meymeh County) Isfahan province, Iran.

== History ==
The Battle of Murche-Khort took place here, and was a part of Nader Shah's campaign to restore the Safavid dynasty.

== Demographics ==
=== Population ===
At the time of the 2006 National Census, the village's population was 1,523 in 431 households. The following census in 2011 counted 1,355 people in 383 households. The 2016 census measured the population of the village as 1,369 people in 394 households, the most populous in its rural district.

== See also ==
Media related to Murcheh Khvort at Wikimedia Commons
