= Khomeynishahr =

City in Isfahan province, Iran

Khomeynishahr Persian: خمينی شهر مهربین Mehrbin
- City
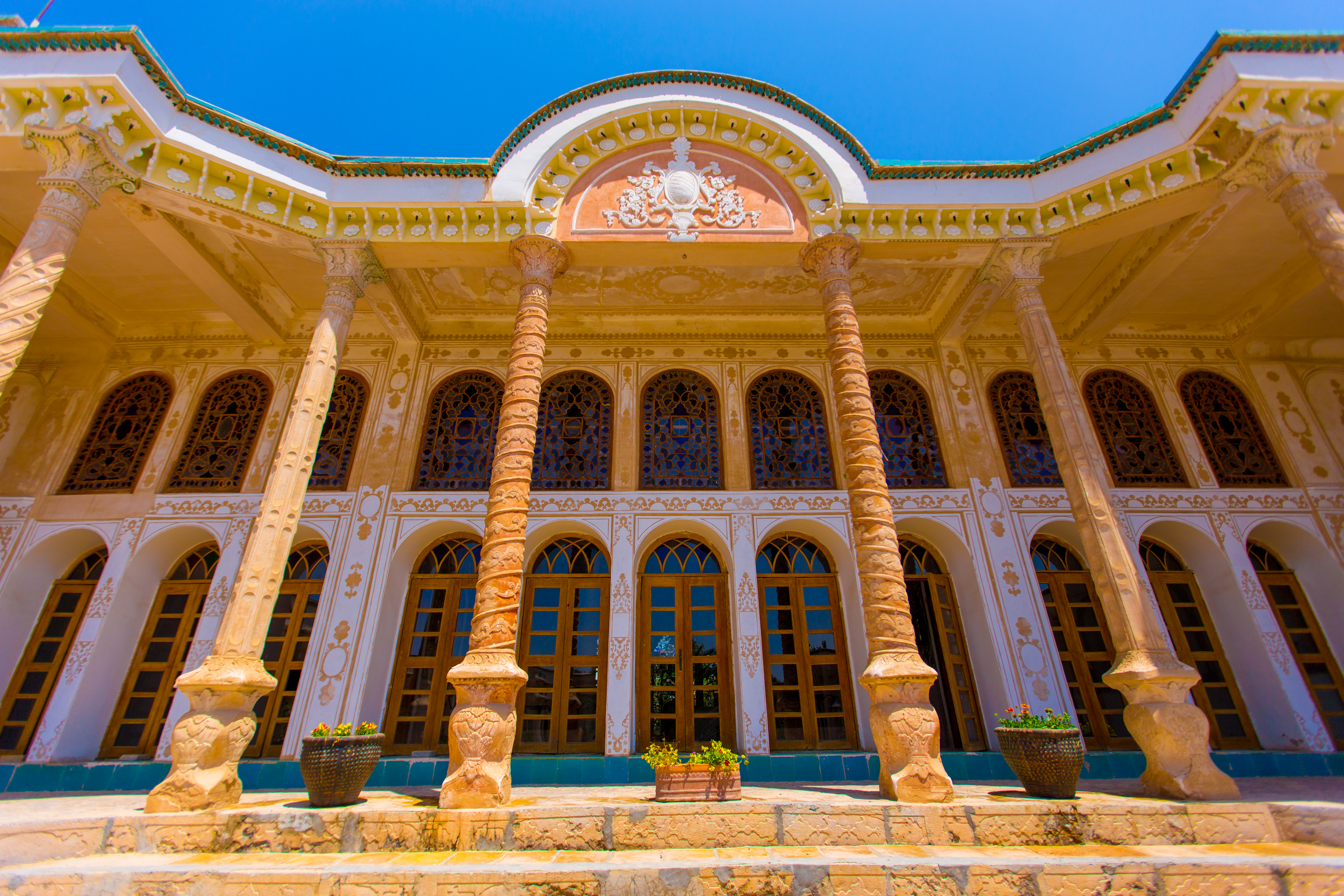
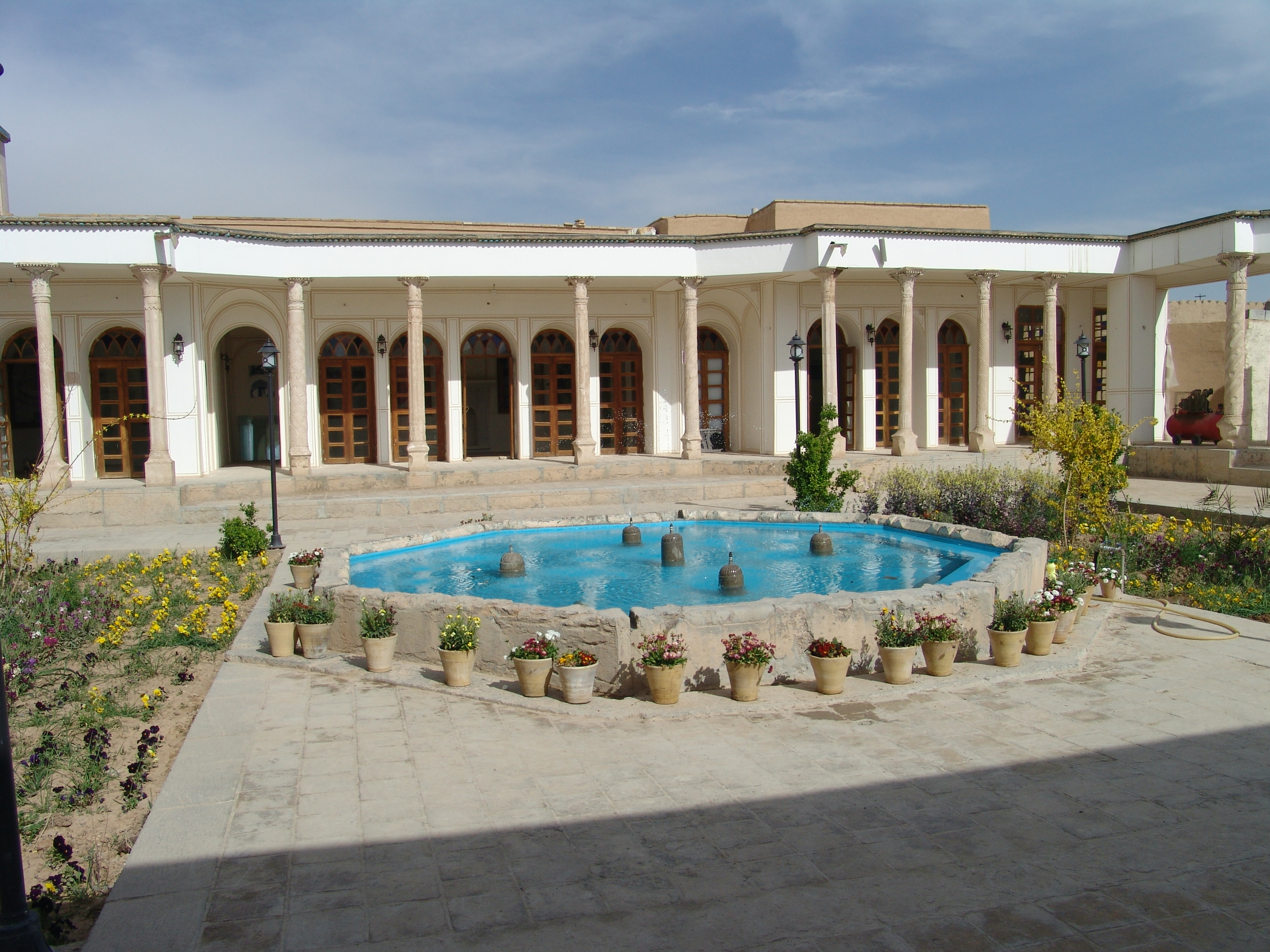

- Location within Iran
- Coordinates: 32°40′49″N 51°32′10″E
- Country: Iran
- Province: Isfahan
- County: Homayunshahr
- District: Central

Population (2016)
  - Total: 247,128
- Time zone: UTC+3:30 (IRST)

Khomeynishahr (Persian: خمينی شهر) (Note: Also romanized as Khomeyni Shahr, Khomeynī Shahr, and Khomeynīshahr; from the 1930s until 1979 known as Homayoon Shahr and Homāyūnshahr (همایون‌شهر); known as Sedeh (سده) (English: Three Villages) prior to the 1930s) is a city in the Central District of Khomeynishahr County, Isfahan province, Iran, serving as capital of both the county and the district. Khomeynishahr is now part of the Isfahan Metropolitan area.

The town was originally known as Sedeh. In the 1930s, the name was changed to Homayunshahr. After the Iranian Revolution of 1979, the city was renamed again to Khomeynishahr (meaning "City of Khomeyni"), in honor of Ayatollah Khomeini. Locals have continued to refer to the city as Sedeh. There has been an ongoing effort to rename back the city's name to its historical one Mehrbin (مهربین).

== History ==
It is commonly believed that the original name, Sedeh (Persian: سده), is derived from Se-dezh, meaning "three castles" in Persian, ("dezh" (دژ) means "castle"), and is linked to the formation of the town by the growth of three neighbouring castles. The three main castles of Kohan Dedge, Gar Dedge, and .... Dedge (locally pronounced kohan dedge, gar dar and ...).

It is commonly believed that Se-dezh was a Sassanian military base and an old fireplace (atash gah) based on top of the mountain near the town.

The three main villages of Khouzan (locally pronounced Khizoon), Foroushan (the origin of Foroushan was Parishan (pari (angel) + voshan (face))), and Varnosfaderan (Venesfohoon) remain identifiable parts of the city. However, there are in fact five former villages forming identifiable parts of the town. This has led to the argument that the name may be linked to the ancient Persian festival of Sadeh.

The name change to Homayunshahr took place during the reign of Reza Shah Pahlavi. The name literally means "auspicious or august city", but Homayun was also a title of the Shah and so the name was seen as being linked with the Pahlavi dynasty. Thus, after the revolution of 1979, the city was renamed again, this time to be called after Ayatollah Khomeini, the leader of the revolution.

=== Khomeynishahr in antiquity ===
Many of the historical events of Khomeynishahr are influenced by the events that took place in Isfahan. However, the historical antiquity of this region dates back to the Sassanid era, the ancient fortress which is located on the way to Isfahan, seems to have been the capital of the Sassanids. In the Islamic era, this area was also very important, and the existence of a large Grand Mosque in Khozan Alley shows that it was a city in the past. Because the Grand Mosque is an urban feature and the villages do not have it. In Mohammad Afghan's invasion of Isfahan, the people of the century bravely persevered and captured a large number of Mahmoud's troops.

== Demographics ==
=== Population ===
At the time of the 2006 National Census, the city's population was 218,737 in 57,551 households. The following census in 2011 counted 244,696 people in 70,121 households. The 2016 census measured the population of the city as 247,128 people in 75,180 households.

== Overview ==
The distance between the city and Isfahan is 8 km. Khomeynishahr city is located in the west of Isfahan province and is limited to Borkhar and Maymeh cities in the north, Falavarjan city in the south, Isfahan city in the east and Najafabad city in the west. This city is one of the most pleasant and most prosperous areas of Isfahan province. Its soil is irrigated by the Zayandehrud River and all its streams are full of water. In addition, it has important caries, which has caused three-quarters of the city's soil to be large orchards and a quarter of its fields.

The material of "Qomish" passes through the southern lands of the city, and because it is connected to the springs at the point of separation from the river, its water never runs out.

Fruits and ground products such as wheat, barley, cucumbers, melons, legumes, tobacco are grown in the city, and some varieties such as spring melons, pavilions, grapes, cherries, Nasrabad and Gortan are famous and similar in other places. Not found.

Its climate is temperate and dry. The highest temperature in summer is 39 degrees above zero and the lowest in winter is 8 degrees below zero.

Since Khomeynishahr was formed from three dozen names called Khozan, Forosh and Vernosfadran, it was called (three ten) which was gradually renamed Homayounshahr and then Khomeynishahr due to the expansion of these villages and their connection to each other.

The city contains many historical buildings and is a good place to welcome tourists. One of the most beautiful historical buildings is Sartip's house located in downtown.

=== Sections and neighborhoods ===
There are several antiquities in the city.

Vernosfadran (including the neighborhoods of Garsele, Zaghabad or Zoga, Balugan, Garder and Kushkbaj) Khozan (including the neighborhoods of Ko Barz or Ko Bazm or Coin Al-Zar, Fatehabad, Jafarabad, Darb-e Mahkameh, Kohandj and Shamsabad) Vendors (including the neighborhoods of Dimitrian, the upper door of the dead, Javadiyeh or Uncle Fazlgah, the door of Seyed, the castle of Agha, Ladreh, the new neighborhood, Sarpol) Andoan Adrian Heristan Qartman (Kurtman) Vaziche Joy Abad Kandandezh Dastgerd Qadadeh Esfriz What Tiranchi Pavilion Asgharabad Qaleh-ye Amiriyeh

New sections include:

Manzaria town Seven hundred devices Qaemiyeh (former slaughterhouse) guards University of Technology staff dormitory (Baqer al-Ulum) Among the industrial and workshop sections, the following can be mentioned:

Dushakh Industrial Zone Kokuchi area (small mountain) Electronic Industrial Town

== Universities ==
The Islamic Azad University of Khomeinyshahr is one of the most promising Iranian universities in various fields, especially in mechanical

Isfahan University of Technology (IUT) is ranked as one of the best universities in Iran.
