= Shapurabad Rural District =

Rural district in Isfahan province, Iran

Shapurabad Rural District Persian: دهستان شاپورآباد
- Rural District
- Location within Iran
- Coordinates: 33°03′N 51°46′E
- Country: Iran
- Province: Isfahan
- County: Borkhar
- District: Habibabad
- Established: 2007
- Capital: Shapurabad

Population (2016)
  - Total: 97
- Time zone: UTC+3:30 (IRST)

Shapurabad Rural District (Persian: دهستان شاپورآباد) is in Habibabad District of Borkhar County, Isfahan province, Iran. It is administered from the city of Shapurabad.

== History ==
In 2007, Borkhar District was separated from Borkhar and Meymeh County (Note: Renamed Shahinshahr and Meymeh County and again renamed Shahinshahr County) in the establishment of Borkhar County, and Shapurabad Rural District was created in the new Habibabad District.

== Demographics ==
=== Population ===
At the time of the 2011 census, the rural district's population was 168 in 59 households. The 2016 census measured the population of the rural district as 97 in 55 households. The most populous of its 41 villages was Shapurabad Industrial Zone, with 51 people.
