= Bagh Miran =

Village in Isfahan province, Iran

Bagh Miran Persian: باغ ميران
- Village
- Location within Iran
- Coordinates: 33°14′35″N 51°32′52″E
- Country: Iran
- Province: Isfahan
- County: Shahinshahr
- District: Central
- Rural District: Murcheh Khvort

Population (2016)
  - Total: 73
- Time zone: UTC+3:30 (IRST)

Bagh Miran (Persian: باغ ميران) (Note: Also romanized as Bāgh Mīrān and Bāgh-e Mīrān) is a village in Murcheh Khvort Rural District of the Central District in Shahinshahr County, (Note: Formerly Borkhar and Meymeh County and then renamed Shahinshahr and Meymeh County) Isfahan province, Iran.

== Demographics ==
=== Population ===
At the time of the 2006 National Census, the village's population was 24 in 14 households. The following census in 2011 counted 57 people in 30 households. The 2016 census measured the population of the village as 73 people in 36 households.
