= Kalahrud =

Village in Isfahan province, Iran

Kalahrud Persian: كلهرود
- Village
- Location within Iran
- Coordinates: 33°21′48″N 51°33′38″E
- Country: Iran
- Province: Isfahan
- County: Shahinshahr
- District: Central
- Rural District: Murcheh Khvort

Population (2016)
  - Total: 215
- Time zone: UTC+3:30 (IRST)

Kalahrud (Persian: كلهرود) (Note: Also romanized as Kalahrūd and Kolahrūd; also known as Qal‘eh-i-Rūd and Qal‘ehrūd) is a village in Murcheh Khvort Rural District of the Central District in Shahinshahr County, (Note: Formerly Borkhar and Meymeh County and then renamed Shahinshahr and Meymeh County) Isfahan province, Iran.

== Demographics ==
=== Population ===
At the time of the 2006 National Census, the village's population was 295 in 128 households. The following census in 2011 counted 217 people in 103 households. The 2016 census measured the population of the village as 215 people in 111 households.
