= Shah Cheragh, Isfahan =

Village in Isfahan province, Iran

Shah Cheragh Persian: شاه چراغ
- Village
- Country: Iran
- Province: Isfahan
- County: Khomeynishahr
- District: Central
- Rural District: Marbin-e Vosta

Population (2016)
  - Total: 43
- Time zone: UTC+3:30 (IRST)

Shah Cheragh (Persian: شاه چراغ) (Note: Also romanized as Shāh Cherāgh) is a village in Marbin-e Vosta Rural District of the Central District in Khomeynishahr County, Isfahan province, Iran.

== Demographics ==
=== Population ===
At the time of the 2006 National Census, the village's population was 30 in 10 households. The village did not appear in the following census of 2011. The 2016 census measured the population of the village as 43 people in 14 households.
