= Jahadabad, Isfahan =

Village in Isfahan province, Iran

Jahadabad Persian: جهاداباد
- Village
- Location within Iran
- Coordinates: 32°51′51″N 51°22′24″E
- Country: Iran
- Province: Isfahan
- County: Shahinshahr
- District: Central
- Rural District: Borkhar-e Gharbi

Population (2016)
  - Total: 1,347
- Time zone: UTC+3:30 (IRST)

Jahadabad (Persian: جهاداباد) (Note: Also romanized as Jahādābād; formerly known as Chaleh Siyah (چاله سياه)) is a village in, and the capital of, Borkhar-e Gharbi Rural District in the Central District of Shahinshahr County, (Note: Formerly Borkhar and Meymeh County and then renamed Shahinshahr and Meymeh County) Isfahan province, Iran. The rural district was previously administered from the city of Gorgab.

== Demographics ==
=== Population ===
At the time of the 2006 National Census, the village's population was 1,422 in 368 households. The following census in 2011 counted 1,480 people in 425 households. The 2016 census measured the population of the village as 1,347 people in 415 households, the most populous in its rural district.
