= Dehlor =

Dehlor or Deh Lor or Dehlar or Deh-e Lor (Persian: دهلر) may refer to:

- Dehlor, Isfahan
- Dehlor, Kermanshah
- Deh Lor, Kermanshah
