= Sin, Iran =

City in Isfahan province, Iran

Sin Persian: سين
- City
- Location within Iran
- Coordinates: 32°51′06″N 51°39′23″E
- Country: Iran
- Province: Isfahan
- County: Borkhar
- District: Central
- Established as a city: 2011

Population (2016)
  - Total: 5,495
- Time zone: UTC+3:30 (IRST)

Sin (Persian: سين) (Note: Also romanized as Sīn) is a city in the Central District of Borkhar County, Isfahan province, Iran, serving as the administrative center for Sin Rural District.

== Demographics ==
=== Population ===
At the time of the 2006 National Census, Sin's population was 4,147 in 1,066 households, when it was a village in Borkhar-e Gharbi Rural District of the Central District in Borkhar and Meymeh County. (Note: Renamed Shahinshahr and Meymeh County and again renamed Shahinshahr County) The following census in 2011 counted 5,198 people in 1,621 households, by which time the village was separated from the county in the establishment of Borkhar County. Sin was transferred to Sin Rural District created in the new Central District. The 2016 census measured the population as 5,495 people in 1,755 households, when the village had been converted to a city.
