= Sin Rural District =

Rural district in Isfahan province, Iran

Sin Rural District Persian: دهستان سین
- Rural District
- Location within Iran
- Coordinates: 33°01′N 51°36′E
- Country: Iran
- Province: Isfahan
- County: Borkhar
- District: Central
- Established: 2007
- Capital: Sin

Population (2016)
  - Total: 38
- Time zone: UTC+3:30 (IRST)

Sin Rural District (Persian: دهستان سین) is in the Central District of Borkhar County, Isfahan province, Iran. It is administered from the city of Sin.

== History ==
In 2007, Borkhar District was separated from Borkhar and Meymeh County (Note: Renamed Shahinshahr and Meymeh County and again renamed Shahinshahr County) in the establishment of Borkhar County, and Sin Rural District was created in the new Central District.

== Demographics ==
=== Population ===
At the time of the 2011 National Census, the rural district's population was 5,205 in 1,625 households. The 2016 census measured the population of the rural district as 38 in 16 households. The most populous of its 28 villages was Mahmudabad, with 16 people.
