= Shapurabad =

City in Isfahan province, Iran

Shapurabad Persian: شاپورآباد
- City
- Location within Iran
- Coordinates: 32°50′31″N 51°44′30″E
- Country: Iran
- Province: Isfahan
- County: Borkhar
- District: Habibabad
- Established as a city: 2010

Population (2016)
  - Total: 5,915
- Time zone: UTC+3:30 (IRST)

Shapurabad (Persian: شادپوراباد) (Note: Also romanized as Shāpūrābād; formerly the village of Shadpurabad) is a city in Habibabad District of Borkhar County, Isfahan province, Iran, serving as the administrative center for Shapurabad Rural District. As a village, it was the capital of Borkhar-e Markazi Rural District until its capital was transferred to the village of Mohsenabad.

== Demographics ==
=== Population ===
At the time of the 2006 National Census, Shapurabad's population was 5,172 in 1,312 households, when it was a village in Borkhar-e Markazi Rural District of the former Borkhar District in Borkhar and Meymeh County. (Note: Renamed Shahinshahr and Meymeh County and again renamed Shahinshahr County) The following census in 2011 counted 5,487 people in 1,561 households, by which time the district had been separated from the county in the establishment of Borkhar County. The rural district was transferred to the new Habibabad District, The 2016 census measured the population of the city as 5,915 people in 1,801 households.
