= Bideshk, Shahinshahr =

Village in Isfahan province, Iran

Bideshk Persian: بيدشك
- Village
- Location within Iran
- Coordinates: 33°23′27″N 51°26′41″E
- Country: Iran
- Province: Isfahan
- County: Shahinshahr
- District: Central
- Rural District: Murcheh Khvort

Population (2016)
  - Total: 62
- Time zone: UTC+3:30 (IRST)

Bideshk (Persian: بيدشك) (Note: Also romanized as Bīdashk and Bīdeshk) is a village in Murcheh Khvort Rural District of the Central District in Shahinshahr County, (Note: Formerly Borkhar and Meymeh County and then renamed Shahinshahr and Meymeh County) Isfahan province, Iran.

== Demographics ==
=== Population ===
At the time of the 2006 National Census, the village's population was 56 in 19 households. The following census in 2011 counted 48 people in 21 households. The 2016 census measured the population of the village as 62 people in 30 households.
