= Suh =

Suh or SUH may refer to:

- Suh (surname), spelling variation of surname Seo
- Ndamukong Suh, American football player
- Suh, Iran, village in Iran
- Sudbury Hill tube station, England, London Underground station code
