= Qaleh-ye Amiriyeh =

Village in Isfahan province, Iran

Qaleh-ye Amiriyeh Persian: قلعه اميريه
- Village
- Location within Iran
- Coordinates: 32°38′35″N 51°32′31″E
- Country: Iran
- Province: Isfahan
- County: Khomeynishahr
- District: Central
- Rural District: Marbin-e Vosta

Population (2016)
  - Total: 1,510
- Time zone: UTC+3:30 (IRST)

Qaleh-ye Amiriyeh (Persian: قلعه اميريه) (Note: Also romanized as Qal‘eh Amīrīyeh and Qal‘eh-ye Amīrīyeh; also known as Qal‘eh Ẕarrābī) is a village in Marbin-e Vosta Rural District of the Central District in Khomeynishahr County, Isfahan province, Iran.

== Demographics ==
=== Population ===
At the time of the 2006 National Census, the village's population was 1,232 in 338 households. The following census in 2011 counted 1,262 people in 391 households. The 2016 census measured the population of the village as 1,510 people in 469 households, the most populous in its rural district.
