= Sohra Kheyrabad =

Village in Isfahan province, Iran

Sohra Kheyrabad Persian: صحراخيراباد
- Village
- Country: Iran
- Province: Isfahan
- County: Shahinshahr
- District: Central
- Rural District: Murcheh Khvort

Population (2016)
  - Total: Below reporting threshold
- Time zone: UTC+3:30 (IRST)

Sohra Kheyrabad (Persian: صحراخيراباد) (Note: Also romanized as Şoḩrā Kheyrābād) is a village in Murcheh Khvort Rural District of the Central District in Shahinshahr County, (Note: Formerly Borkhar and Meymeh County and then renamed Shahinshahr and Meymeh County) Isfahan province, Iran.

== Demographics ==
=== Population ===
At the time of the 2006 National Census, the village's population was 104 in 39 households. The following census in 2011 counted 51 people in 19 households. The 2016 census measured the population of the village as below the reporting threshold.
