= Central District (Borkhar County) =

District in Isfahan province, Iran

Central District (Borkhar County) Persian: بخش مرکزی شهرستان برخوار
- District
- Location within Iran
- Coordinates: 33°00′N 51°37′E
- Country: Iran
- Province: Isfahan
- County: Borkhar
- Established: 2007
- Capital: Dowlatabad

Population (2016)
  - Total: 97,678
- Time zone: UTC+3:30 (IRST)

The Central District of Borkhar County (Persian: بخش مرکزی شهرستان برخوار) is in Isfahan province, Iran. Its capital is the city of Dowlatabad.

== History ==
In 2007, Borkhar District was separated from Borkhar and Meymeh County (Note: Renamed Shahinshahr and Meymeh County and again renamed Shahinshahr County) in the establishment of Borkhar County, which was divided into two districts of two rural districts each, with Dowlatabad as its capital. The village of Sin was converted to a city in 2011.

== Demographics ==
=== Population ===
At the time of the 2011 National Census, the district's population was 85,293 people in 24,665 households. The 2016 census measured the population of the district as 97,678 inhabitants in 29,858 households.

=== Administrative divisions ===
Central District (Borkhar County) Population
Administrative Divisions	2011	2016
Borkhar-e Markazi RD	3,821	4,271
Sin RD	5,205	38
Dastgerd (city)	16,848	17,775
Dowlatabad (city)	37,098	40,945
Khvorzuq (city)	22,321	29,154
Sin (city)		5,495
Total	85,293	97,678
RD = Rural District
