= Sohra Khal-e Sefid =

Village in Isfahan province, Iran

Sohra Khal-e Sefid Persian: صحراخال سفيد
- Village
- Country: Iran
- Province: Isfahan
- County: Shahinshahr
- District: Central
- Rural District: Murcheh Khvort

Population (2016)
  - Total: 0
- Time zone: UTC+3:30 (IRST)

Sohra Khal-e Sefid (Persian: صحراخال سفيد) (Note: Also romanized as Şoḩrā Khāl-e Sefīd) is a village in Murcheh Khvort Rural District of the Central District in Shahinshahr County, (Note: Formerly Borkhar and Meymeh County and then renamed Shahinshahr and Meymeh County) Isfahan province, Iran.

== Demographics ==
=== Population ===
At the time of the 2006 National Census, the village's population was 17 in five households. The following census in 2011 counted 35 people in 14 households. The 2016 census measured the population of the village as zero.
