= Sohra Heydarabad =

Village in Isfahan province, Iran

Sohra Heydarabad Persian: صحراحيدراباد
- Village
- Country: Iran
- Province: Isfahan
- County: Shahinshahr
- District: Central
- Rural District: Murcheh Khvort

Population (2016)
  - Total: 0
- Time zone: UTC+3:30 (IRST)

Sahra Heydarabad (Persian: صحراحيدراباد) (Note: Also romanized as Şaḩrā Ḩeydarābād) is a village in Murcheh Khvort Rural District of the Central District in Shahinshahr County, (Note: Formerly Borkhar and Meymeh County and then renamed Shahinshahr and Meymeh County) Isfahan province, Iran.

== Demographics ==
=== Population ===
At the time of the 2006 National Census, the village's population was 16 in 10 households. The following census in 2011 counted 20 people in nine households. The 2016 census measured the population of the village as zero.
