= Dehlor, Isfahan =

Village in Isfahan province, Iran

Dehlor Persian: دهلر
- Village
- Location within Iran
- Coordinates: 33°21′48″N 51°26′07″E
- Country: Iran
- Province: Isfahan
- County: Shahinshahr
- District: Central
- Rural District: Murcheh Khvort

Population (2016)
  - Total: 56
- Time zone: UTC+3:30 (IRST)

Dehlor (Persian: دهلر) (Note: Also romanized as Deh-e Lor; also known as Deh-e Lūr, Deh-i-Lur, and Dehlūr) is a village in Murcheh Khvort Rural District of the Central District in Shahinshahr County, (Note: Formerly Borkhar and Meymeh County and then renamed Shahinshahr and Meymeh County) Isfahan province, Iran.

== Demographics ==
=== Population ===
At the time of the 2006 National Census, the village's population was 46 in 18 households. The following census in 2011 counted 46 people in 22 households. The 2016 census measured the population of the village as 56 people in 30 households.
