= Hyper Shahr Shahin Shahr FSC =

Iranian futsal club

Hyper Shahr
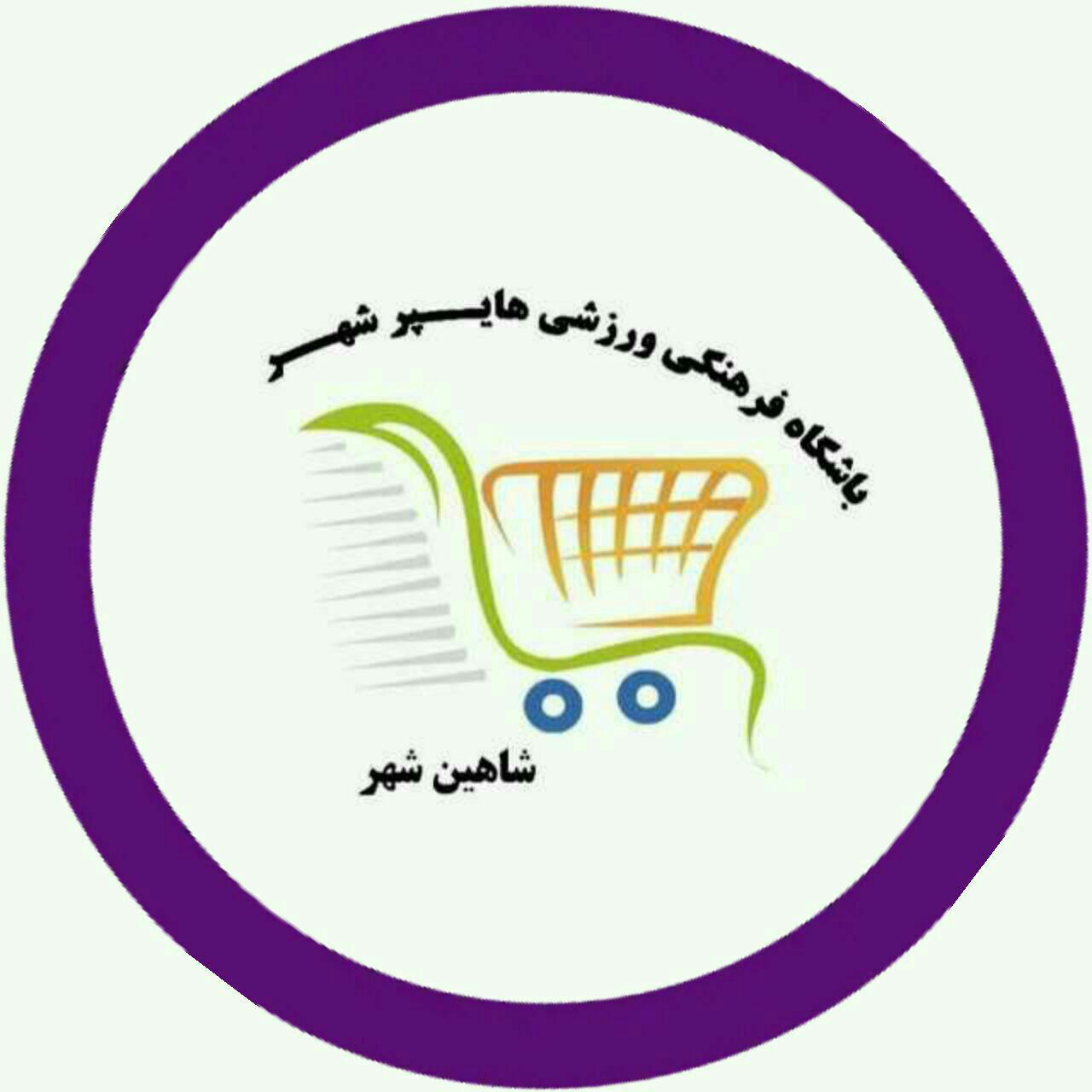
- Full name: Hyper Shahr Shahin Shahr Futsal Club
- Founded: 9 September 2017
- Dissolved: 8 December 2020
- Ground: Takhti Indoor Stadium, Shahin Shahr
- Capacity: 3,500

Hyper Shahr Shahin Shahr Futsal Club (Persian: باشگاه فوتسال هایپر شهر شاهین شهر) was an Iranian professional futsal club based in Shahin Shahr.

== Season by season ==
The table below chronicles the achievements of the Club in various competitions.

Season	League	Position	Notes
2017–18	2nd Division	Buy license from Federation	Relegation
2017–18	2nd Division	6th / Group 3	Relegation
2018–19	1st Division	Replaced for Raad Padafand Isfahan	Promoted Play Off
2018–19	1st Division	2nd / Group A	Promoted Play Off
2019–20	Super League	9th

Champions	Runners-up	Third Place	Fourth Place	Relegation	Promoted	Did not qualify	not held
