= Soh, Shahinshahr =

Village in Isfahan province, Iran

Soh Persian: سُه
- Village
- Location within Iran
- Coordinates: 31°46′40″N 51°22′28″E
- Country: Iran
- Province: Isfahan
- County: Shahinshahr
- District: Central
- Rural District: Murcheh Khvort

Population (2016)
  - Total: 295
- Time zone: UTC+3:30 (IRST)

Soh (Persian: سه) (Note: Also known as Sō and Sūh) is a village in Murcheh Khvort Rural District of the Central District in Shahinshahr County, (Note: Formerly Borkhar and Meymeh County and then renamed Shahinshahr and Meymeh County) Isfahan province, Iran.

== Demographics ==
=== Population ===
At the time of the 2006 National Census, the village's population was 403 in 141 households. The following census in 2011 counted 281 people in 108 households. The 2016 census measured the population of the village as 295 people in 127 households.
