= Tiranchi =

Village in Isfahan province, Iran

Tiranchi Persian: تيرانچي
- Village
- Location within Iran
- Coordinates: 32°37′48″N 51°31′19″E
- Country: Iran
- Province: Isfahan
- County: Khomeynishahr
- District: Central
- Rural District: Marbin-e Olya

Population (2016)
  - Total: 3,122
- Time zone: UTC+3:30 (IRST)

Tiranchi (Persian: تيرانچي) (Note: Also romanized as Tīrānchī; also known as Tīrūnchin) is a village in Marbin-e Olya Rural District of the Central District in Khomeynishahr County, Isfahan province, Iran.

== Demographics ==
=== Population ===
At the time of the 2006 National Census, the village's population was 2,750 in 737 households. The following census in 2011 counted 2,758 people in 835 households. The 2016 census measured the population of Tiranchi as 3,122 people in 953 households, the only village its rural district with a reported population.
