= Murcheh Khvort Rural District =

Rural district in Isfahan province, Iran

Murcheh Khvort Rural District Persian: دهستان مورچه خورت
- Rural District
- Location within Iran
- Coordinates: 33°14′N 51°22′E
- Country: Iran
- Province: Isfahan
- County: Shahinshahr
- District: Central
- Established: 1993
- Capital: Murcheh Khvort

Population (2016)
  - Total: 2,198
- Time zone: UTC+3:30 (IRST)

Murcheh Khvort Rural District (Persian: دهستان مورچه خورت) is in the Central District of Shahinshahr County, (Note: Formerly Borkhar and Meymeh County and then renamed Shahinshahr and Meymeh County) Isfahan province, Iran. Its capital is the village of Murcheh Khvort.

== Demographics ==
=== Population ===
At the time of the 2006 National Census, the rural district's population was 2,876 in 949 households. There were 2,263 inhabitants in 764 households at the following census of 2011. The 2016 census measured the population of the rural district as 2,198 in 758 households. The most populous of its 39 villages was Murcheh Khvort, with 1,369 people.

=== Other villages in the rural district ===
- Bagh Miran
- Bideshk
- Dehlor
- Kalahrud
- Soh
- Sohra Heydarabad
- Sohra Khal-e Sefid
- Sohra Kheyrabad
