= Asgharabad, Isfahan =

City in Isfahan province, Iran

Asgharabad Persian: اصغراباد
- City
- Location within Iran
- Coordinates: 32°39′08″N 51°29′01″E
- Country: Iran
- Province: Isfahan
- County: Khomeynishahr
- District: Central
- Established as a city: 2011

Population (2016)
  - Total: 6,876
- Time zone: UTC+3:30 (IRST)

Asgharabad (Persian: اصغراباد) (Note: Also romanized as Aşgharābād) is a city in the Central District of Khomeynishahr County, Isfahan province, Iran.

== Demographics ==
=== Population ===
At the time of the 2006 National Census, Asgharabad's population was 5,682 in 1,546 households, when it was a village in Marbin-e Olya Rural District. The following census in 2011 counted 6,182 people in 1,825 households. The 2016 census measured the population as 6,876 people in 2,066 households, by which time the village had been converted to a city.
