= Kushk, Iran =

City in Isfahan province, Iran

Kushk Persian: کوشک
- City
- Location within Iran
- Coordinates: 32°38′31″N 51°29′59″E
- Country: Iran
- Province: Isfahan
- County: Khomeynishahr
- District: Central

Population (2016)
  - Total: 13,248
- Time zone: UTC+3:30 (IRST)

Kushk (Persian: کوشک) (Note: Also romanized as Kūshk) is a city in the Central District of Khomeynishahr County, Isfahan province, Iran, serving as the administrative center for Marbin-e Olya Rural District.

== Demographics ==
=== Population ===
At the time of the 2006 National Census, the city's population was 11,264 in 3,083 households. The following census in 2011 counted 12,029 people in 3,670 households. The 2016 census measured the population of the city as 13,248 people in 4,176 households.
