= Borkhar-e Sharqi Rural District =

Rural district in Isfahan province, Iran

Borkhar-e Sharqi Rural District Persian: دهستان برخوار شرقي
- Rural District
- Location within Iran
- Coordinates: 33°01′N 51°54′E
- Country: Iran
- Province: Isfahan
- County: Borkhar
- District: Habibabad
- Established: 1987
- Capital: Komeshcheh

Population (2016)
  - Total: 4,138
- Time zone: UTC+3:30 (IRST)

Borkhar-e Sharqi Rural District (Persian: دهستان برخوار شرقي) is in Habibabad District of Borkhar County, Isfahan province, Iran. It is administered from the city of Komeshcheh. The previous capital of the rural district was the village of Mohsenabad, now in Borkhar-e Markazi Rural District.

== Demographics ==
=== Population ===
At the time of the 2006 National Census, the rural district's population (as a part of the former Borkhar District in Borkhar and Meymeh County) (Note: Renamed Shahinshahr and Meymeh County and again renamed Shahinshahr County) was 3,429 in 881 households. There were 3,670 inhabitants in 1,101 households at the following census of 2011, by which time the district had been separated from the county in the establishment of Borkhar County. The rural district was transferred to the new Habibabad District. The 2016 census measured the population of the rural district as 4,138 in 1,306 households. The most populous of its 27 villages was Aliabad-e Molla Ali, with 3,312 people.

=== Other villages in the rural district ===
- Aliabad Chi
- Donbi
- Margh
- Parvaneh
- Shurcheh
