= Marbin-e Sofla Rural District =

Rural district in Isfahan province, Iran

Marbin-e Sofla Rural District Persian: دهستان ماربین سفلی
- Rural District
- Location within Iran
- Coordinates: 32°44′N 51°32′E
- Country: Iran
- Province: Isfahan
- County: Khomeynishahr
- District: Central
- Established: 1987

Population (2016)
  - Total: 0
- Time zone: UTC+3:30 (IRST)

Marbin-e Sofla Rural District (Persian: دهستان ماربین سفلی) is in the Central District of Khomeynishahr County, Isfahan province, Iran. (Note: The capital of the rural district is listed as the village of Dastjerd-e Ghadadeh (دستجرد غَدادِه), or Dastjerd-e Qadadeh (دستجرد قداده), by the Encyclopaedia of the Islamic World, and Juyabad (جوی‌آباد) by the Ministry of the Interior)

== History ==
Marbin-e Sofla Rural District was created in 1987 and constituted 10 villages at the time.

== Demographics ==
=== Population ===
The rural district did not appear in the 2006 census. Its population was below the reporting threshold at the time of the following census in 2011. The 2016 census measured the population of the rural district as zero. Its two villages were Emamzadeh Seyyed Mohammad (امامزاده سيدمحمد) and Mazraeh-ye Khushab (مزرعه خوشاب), both of which registered a population of zero.
