= Greater Isfahan metropolitan area =

Greater Isfahan metropolitan area and suburbs کلانشهر اصفهان بزرگ و حومه
- Metropolitan Area
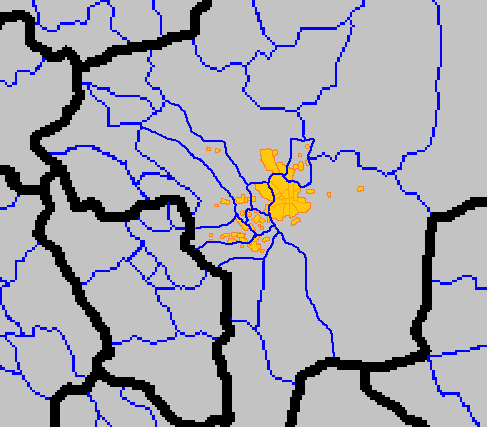
- Location of municipalities in the metropolitan region

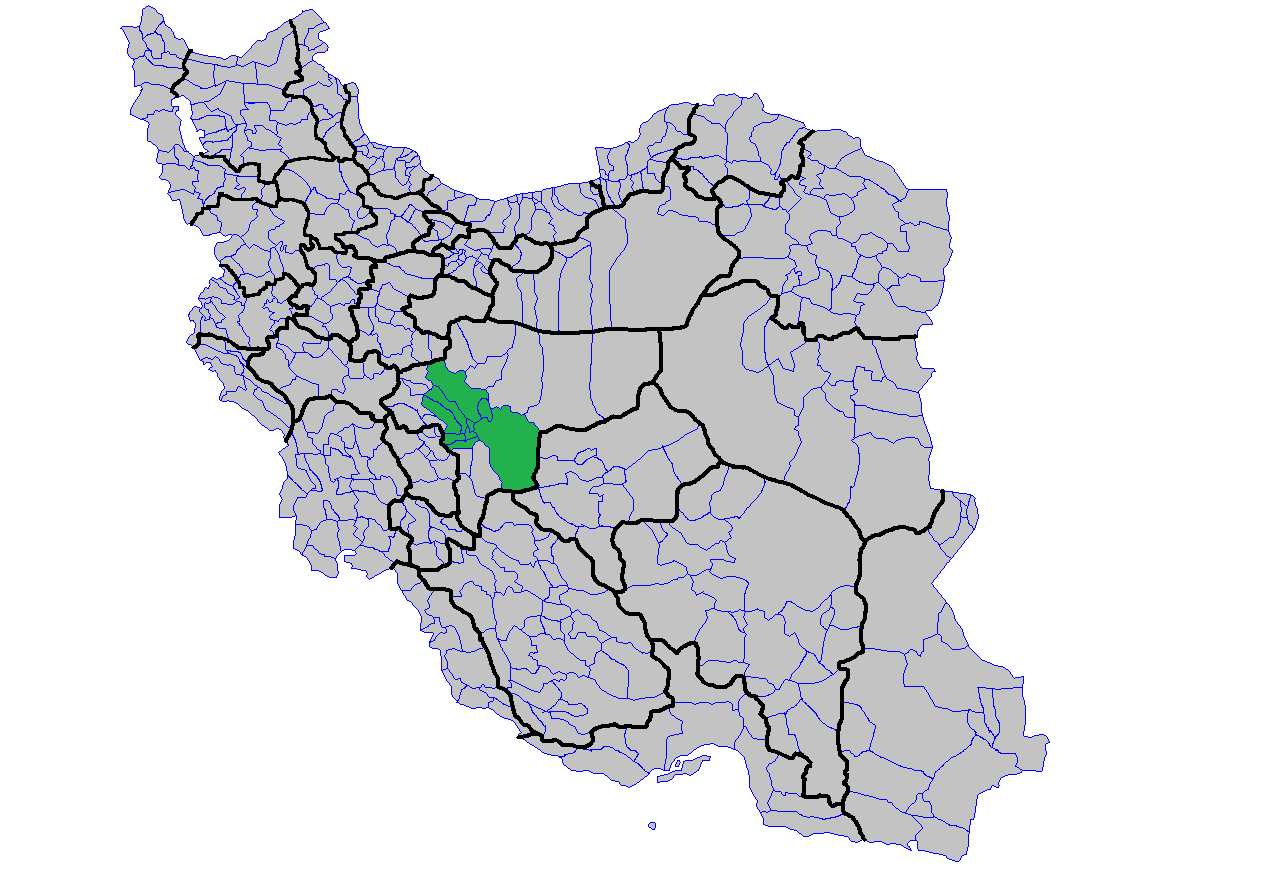
- Location of Isfahan metropolitan region in Iran
- Country: Iran (Isfahan province)
- Counties: Isfahan County; Borkhar County; Shahin Shahr and Meymeh County; Najafabad County; Khomeyni Shahr County; Falavarjan County; Lenjan County; Mobarakeh County

Government

Area
  - Metro: 4,500 km^{2} (1,700 sq mi)

Population (2022)
  - Metro: 4,900,000
- Time zone: UTC+3:30 (IRST)

Greater Isfahan metropolitan area is a metropolitan region in Isfahan province, central Iran. This region, although not having any official designation and recognition yet, is the second biggest one in Iran, behind the capital city Tehran (Greater Tehran). The overall region has a population of over 4,900,000 with an area of 4500 km^{2} and extends along Zayandeh Rud, the main river axis through the province, and also along the northern-southern axis of the city, plus a western axis towards Lorestan province. The region is a transportation hub and an industrial centre having concentrated all steel related industries in it. The region is also home to important military installations and centres, including nuclear facilities and airbases.
