= American School of Isfahan =

- Toufanian High School

Location
- Ferdowsi St. and Daneshgah Blvd، Shahin Shahr; Iran

Information
- Type: K-12 grade
- Established: 1973
- Closed: 31 December 1978; 47 years ago
- Superintendent: Howard R. Wire
- Enrollment: 600
- Language: English
- Color: White Red
- Yearbook: Zagros
- Website: www.mauiholm.org/mobile_web/index.html

Located in and around the Isfahan metro area, Iran, the American School Of Isfahan (ASI) was an international K-12 grade American School from 1973 through the end of 1978. Many of the school's teachers were from the United States or Europe. Its athletic teams competed against other international and western college preparatory schools in Iran, Egypt, and the UAE.

During the 1970s, Iran saw the influx of thousands of Americans, Europeans, and East Asians working for various military and civilian joint industrial ventures. Many brought their families as well, with the result that Isfahan alone hosted a non-Middle Eastern community of well over ten thousand by 1978, among its six hundred thousand residents.

At the behest of Bell Helicopter International, Grumman Aircraft, NWASI (Northrop Worldwide Aircraft Services International), the Iranian Ministry of Defense Military-Industrial Organization, and International Schools Services (ISS) formed the American School Of Isfahan in 1973 to educate the children of foreign contractors. Moderately open enrollment for those willing to pay the yearly five thousand dollars (US) tuition added a number of children from the families of well-off Iranians, as well as from foreigners not sponsored by major corporations. In addition, ISS created a "model school" for the children of Imperial Iranian Air Force (IIAF) families at nearby Khatami AFB.

Basic instruction was in English and focused on a United States college preparatory curriculum.

Enrollment grew from fewer than fifty students in 1973 to over 600 by the beginning of the '78–'79 school year. Starting from a few rooms in the Iran-America Cultural Society, ASI eventually included four facilities across Metropolitan Isfahan for grades K through 12.

The School was closed in the midst of the revolution of 1978 – 1979, with the last of the staff and students departing in December 1978. Subsequently, the school's textbooks and library were transferred to an Isfahan teachers research center, while the high school buildings in Shahinshahr became part of a Malek Ashtar University (MUT) satellite campus.

== External sources ==
- International Schools Services
- ASI Yearbooks
- Post-revolution information
- Court records of a sex-discrimination lawsuit brought against ISS by some former teachers at the school; includes several facts about the school.
