= Marbin-e Vosta Rural District =

Rural district in Isfahan province, Iran

Marbin-e Vosta Rural District Persian: دهستان ماربين وسطي
- Rural District
- Location within Iran
- Coordinates: 32°39′N 51°32′E
- Country: Iran
- Province: Isfahan
- County: Khomeynishahr
- District: Central
- Established: 1987

Population (2016)
  - Total: 1,553
- Time zone: UTC+3:30 (IRST)

Marbin-e Vosta Rural District (Persian: دهستان ماربين وسطي) is in the Central District of Khomeynishahr County, Isfahan province, Iran. (Note: The capital of the rural district is listed as the village of Qartan (قرطان), or Qartman (قَرْطِمانْ), by the Encyclopaedia of the Islamic World, and Adriyan (آدریان) by the Ministry of the Interior)

== Demographics ==
=== Population ===
At the time of the 2006 National Census, the rural district's population was 1,272 in 350 households. There were 1,262 inhabitants in 391 households at the following census of 2011. The 2016 census measured the population of the rural district as 1,553 in 483 households. The most populous of its five villages was Qaleh-ye Amiriyeh, with 1,510 people.

=== Other villages in the rural district ===
- Shah Cheragh
