= Komeshcheh =

City in Isfahan province, Iran

Komeshcheh Persian: کمشچه
- City
- Location within Iran
- Coordinates: 32°54′18″N 51°48′35″E
- Country: Iran
- Province: Isfahan
- County: Borkhar
- District: Habibabad
- Established as a city: 2003

Population (2016)
  - Total: 5,100
- Time zone: UTC+3:30 (IRST)

Komeshcheh (Persian: کمشچه) (Note: Also romanized as Komshecheh; also known as Gomsheh, Komshehcheh, Kumsheh, Qomsheh, and Qumisheh; also known as Gomshecheh) is a city in Habibabad District of Borkhar County, Isfahan province, Iran, serving as the administrative center for Borkhar-e Sharqi Rural District. The previous capital of the rural district was the village of Mohsenabad, now in Borkhar-e Markazi Rural District. The village of Komeshcheh was converted to a city in 2003.

== Demographics ==
=== Population ===
At the time of the 2006 National Census, the city's population was 4,395 in 1,072 households, when it was in the former Borkhar District of Borkhar and Meymeh County. (Note: Renamed Shahinshahr and Meymeh County and then Shahinshahr County) The following census in 2011 counted 4,871 people in 1,379 households, by which time the district had been separated from the county in the establishment of Borkhar County. Komeshcheh and the rural district were transferred to the new Habibabad District. The 2016 census measured the population of the city as 5,100 people in 1,598 households.

== Overview ==
Founded in 1382, Komeshcheh is located about 20 kilometers northeast of Isfahan, the provincial capital, and 200 kilometers south of the city of Qom. In addition to some pre-Islamic monuments, it is the site of Aliabad Shahvazy castle and an old town mosque and bath. Its main economic activities are bread manufacturing and home baking, which employ 2,000 people, supplying the daily bread of a population of 200,000 in the surrounding areas.

According to Iran media, the "world's largest flat bread," baked in Komeshcheh in 2008, was recorded in the Guinness Book of World Records.
