= Bideshk, Ardestan =

Bideshk بيدشك
- Village
- Location within Iran
- Coordinates: 33°04′44″N 52°21′44″E
- Country: Iran
- Province: Isfahan
- County: Ardestan
- Bakhsh: Central
- Rural District: Barzavand

Population (2006)
  - Total: 46
- Time zone: UTC+3:30 (IRST)
  - Summer (DST): UTC+4:30 (IRDT)

Bideshk (Persian: بيدشك, also Romanized as Bīdeshk; also known as Bīdeshg) is a village in Barzavand Rural District, in the Central District of Ardestan County, Isfahan Province, Iran. At the 2006 census, its population was 46, in 16 families.
