= Shahab Khodro =

Iranian manufacturing company

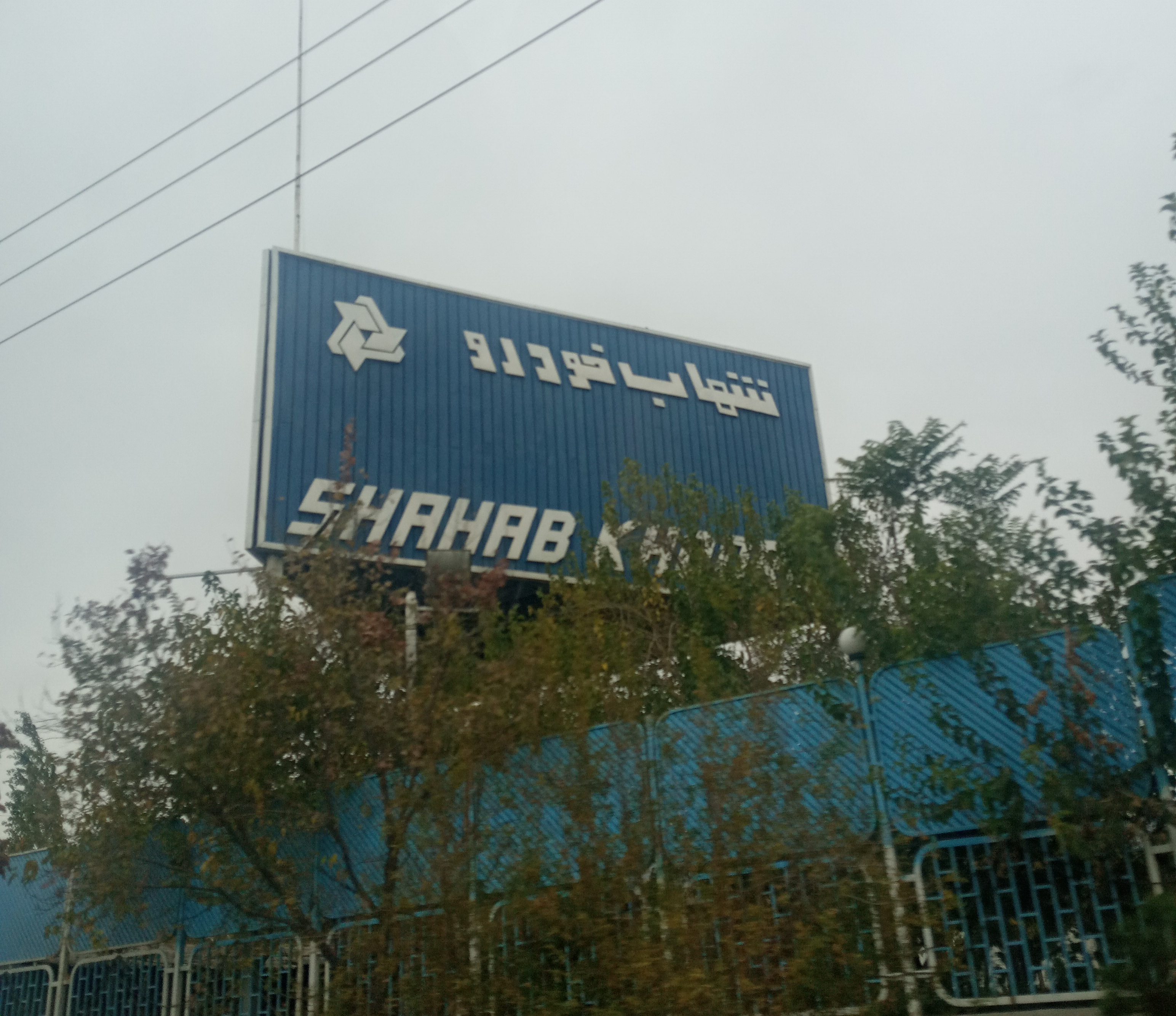
Shahab khodro company

Shahab Khodro (Persian: شهاب خودرو) is an Iranian company which manufactures autobuses. Founded in 1962, it is one of the oldest and best-known Iranian motor companies.

The company began producing double-decker buses in 1972. In 1987, Shahab Khodro company teamed up with TAM, a former Yugoslavian company, in manufacturing buses. The company later entered into technical co-operation with Renault Group of France, who purchased a 35% stake in the company.
