= Khvorzuq =

City in Isfahan province, Iran

Khvorzuq Persian: خورزوق
- City
- Location within Iran
- Coordinates: 32°46′42″N 51°38′52″E
- Country: Iran
- Province: Isfahan
- County: Borkhar
- District: Central

Population (2016)
  - Total: 29,154
- Time zone: UTC+3:30 (IRST)

Khvorzuq (Persian: خورزوق) (Note: Also romanized as Khowrzūq, Khowrz̄ūq, Khūrzūq, Khurzuq, Khvor Z̄owq, and Khvorzūq; also known as Khorzūq, Khowrz̄ūg, and Khūzūq) is a city in the Central District of Borkhar County, Isfahan province, Iran.

== Demographics ==
=== Population ===
At the time of the 2006 National Census, the city's population was 20,301 in 5,478 households, when it was in the former Borkhar District of Borkhar and Meymeh County. (Note: Renamed Shahinshahr and Meymeh County and again renamed Shahinshahr County) The following census in 2011 counted 22,321 people in 6,606 households, by which time the district had been separated from the county in the establishment of Borkhar County. Khvorzuq was transferred to the new Central District. The 2016 census measured the population of the city as 29,154 people in 9,011 households.
