= Lor, Kermanshah =

Lor لر
- Village
- Location within Iran
- Coordinates: 34°04′33″N 46°33′06″E
- Country: Iran
- Province: Kermanshah
- County: Eslamabad-e Gharb
- Bakhsh: Central
- Rural District: Howmeh-ye Jonubi

Population (2006)
  - Total: 362
- Time zone: UTC+3:30 (IRST)
  - Summer (DST): UTC+4:30 (IRDT)

Lor (Persian: لر; also known as Deh Lor, Lord, and Lūrail) is a village in Howmeh-ye Jonubi Rural District, in the Central District of Eslamabad-e Gharb County, Kermanshah Province, Iran. At the 2006 census, its population was 362, in 81 families.
