= Bideshak, Khabar =

Bideshak بيدشك
- Village
- Location within Iran
- Coordinates: 28°55′25″N 56°09′55″E
- Country: Iran
- Province: Kerman
- County: Baft
- Bakhsh: Central
- Rural District: Khabar

Population (2006)
  - Total: 107
- Time zone: UTC+3:30 (IRST)
  - Summer (DST): UTC+4:30 (IRDT)

Bideshak (Persian: بيدشك, also Romanized as Bīdeshak, Bidashk, and Bīdeshk; also known as Bidishk) is a village in Khabar Rural District, in the Central District of Baft County, Kerman Province, Iran. At the 2006 census, its population was 107, in 21 families.
