= Dorcheh, Isfahan =

City in Isfahan province, Iran

Dorcheh Persian: درچه
- City
- Location within Iran
- Coordinates: 32°36′47″N 51°33′11″E
- Country: Iran
- Province: Isfahan
- County: Khomeynishahr
- District: Central

Population (2016)
  - Total: 47,800
- Time zone: UTC+3:30 (IRST)

Dorcheh (Persian: درچه) (Note: Also romanized as Darcheh; formerly Dorcheh Piaz (درچه پياز)) is a city in the Central District of Khomeynishahr County, Isfahan province, Iran.

== Demographics ==
=== Population ===
At the time of the 2006 National Census, the city's population was 43,183 in 12,038 households. The following census in 2011 counted 44,689 people in 13,888 households. The 2016 census measured the population of the city as 47,800 people in 25,411 households.
