= Gorgab, Isfahan =

City in Isfahan province, Iran

Gorgab Persian: گرگاب
- City
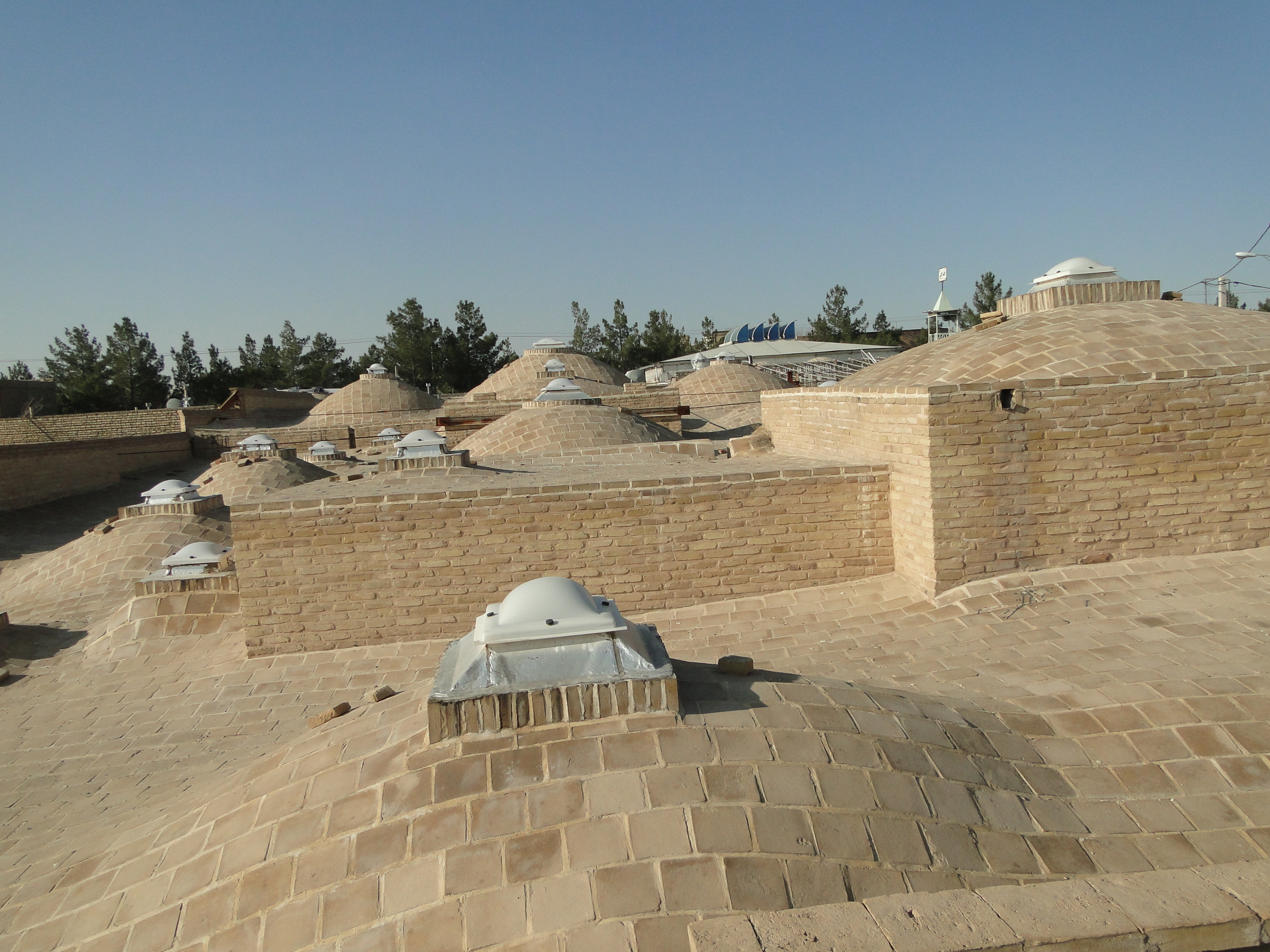

- Location within Iran
- Coordinates: 32°51′58″N 51°35′50″E
- Country: Iran
- Province: Isfahan
- County: Shahinshahr
- District: Central
- Established as a city: 2007

Population (2016)
  - Total: 9,690
- Time zone: UTC+3:30 (IRST)

Gorgab (Persian: گرگاب) (Note: Also romanized as Gorgāb; also known as Gurgāb, and Gurgāb Karīmābād) is a city in the Central District of Shahinshahr County, (Note: Formerly Borkhar and Meymeh County and then renamed Shahinshahr and Meymeh County) Isfahan province, Iran. It served as the administrative center for Borkhar-e Gharbi Rural District until its capital was transferred to the village of Jahadabad.

== Demographics ==
=== Population ===
At the time of the 2006 National Census, Gorgab's population was 4,859 in 1,252 households, when it was a village in Borkhar-e Gharbi Rural District. The following census in 2011 counted 6,359 people in 1,903 households. by which time Gorgab had been converted to a city. The 2016 census measured the population of the city as 9,690 people in 2,920 households.
