= Bideshk, Kiskan =

Bideshk بيدشك
- Village
- Location within Iran
- Coordinates: 29°18′25″N 56°37′30″E
- Country: Iran
- Province: Kerman
- County: Baft
- Bakhsh: Central
- Rural District: Kiskan

Population (2006)
  - Total: 27
- Time zone: UTC+3:30 (IRST)
  - Summer (DST): UTC+4:30 (IRDT)

Bideshk (Persian: بيدشك, also Romanized as Bīdeshk and Bīde Shak) is a village in Kiskan Rural District, in the Central District of Baft County, Kerman Province, Iran. At the 2006 census, its population was 27, in 13 families.
