= Juyabad =

Juyabad جوي اباد
- Village
- Location within Iran
- Coordinates: 32°52′01″N 52°41′41″E
- Country: Iran
- Province: Isfahan
- County: Nain
- Bakhsh: Central
- Rural District: Baharestan

Population (2006)
  - Total: 13
- Time zone: UTC+3:30 (IRST)
  - Summer (DST): UTC+4:30 (IRDT)

Juyabad (Persian: جوي اباد, also Romanized as Jūyābād) is a village in Baharestan Rural District, in the Central District of Nain County, Isfahan Province, Iran. At the 2006 census, its population was 13, in 9 families.
