= Marbin-e Olya Rural District =

Rural district in Isfahan province, Iran

Marbin-e Olya Rural District Persian: دهستان ماربين عليا
- Rural District
- Location within Iran
- Coordinates: 32°41′N 51°28′E
- Country: Iran
- Province: Isfahan
- County: Khomeynishahr
- District: Central
- Established: 1987
- Capital: Kushk

Population (2016)
  - Total: 3,122
- Time zone: UTC+3:30 (IRST)

Marbin-e Olya Rural District (Persian: دهستان ماربين عليا) is in the Central District of Khomeynishahr County, Isfahan province, Iran. It is administered from the city of Kushk.

== Demographics ==
=== Population ===
At the time of the 2006 National Census, the rural district's population was 8,432 in 2,283 households. There were 8,951 inhabitants in 2,664 households at the following census of 2011. The 2016 census measured the population of the rural district as 3,122 in 953 households. The only one of its 11 villages reporting a population was Tiranchi, with 3,122 people.
