= Borkhar-e Gharbi Rural District =

Rural district in Isfahan province, Iran

Borkhar-e Gharbi Rural District Persian: دهستان برخوار غربي
- Rural District
- Location within Iran
- Coordinates: 32°52′N 51°26′E
- Country: Iran
- Province: Isfahan
- County: Shahinshahr
- District: Central
- Established: 1987
- Capital: Jahadabad

Population (2016)
  - Total: 1,956
- Time zone: UTC+3:30 (IRST)

Borkhar-e Gharbi Rural District (Persian: دهستان برخوار غربي) is in the Central District of Shahinshahr County, (Note: Formerly Borkhar and Meymeh County and then renamed Shahinshahr and Meymeh County) Isfahan province, Iran. Its capital is the village of Jahadabad. The rural district was previously administered from the city of Gorgab.

== Demographics ==
=== Population ===
At the time of the 2006 National Census, the rural district's population was 11,525 in 2,910 households. There were 1,965 inhabitants in 557 households at the following census of 2011. The 2016 census measured the population of the rural district as 1,956 in 592 households. The most populous of its 45 villages was Jahadabad, with 1,347 people.
