= Dastgerd =

City in Isfahan province, Iran

Dastgerd Persian: دستگرد
- City
- Location within Iran
- Coordinates: 32°48′03″N 51°39′53″E
- Country: Iran
- Province: Isfahan
- County: Borkhar
- District: Central

Population (2016)
  - Total: 17,775
- Time zone: UTC+3:30 (IRST)

Dastgerd (Persian: دستگرد) (Note: Also known as Dastgird and Dastjerd) is a city in the Central District of Borkhar County, Isfahan province, Iran.

== Demographics ==
=== Population ===
At the time of the 2006 National Census, the city population was 15,524 in 4,028 households, when it was in the former Borkhar District of Borkhar and Meymeh County. (Note: Renamed Shahinshahr and Meymeh County and again renamed Shahinshahr County) The following census in 2011 counted 16,848 people in 4,805 households, by which time the district had been separated from the county in the establishment of Borkhar County. Dastgerd was transferred to the new Central District. The 2016 census measured the population of the city as 17,775 people in 5,408 households.
