= Central District (Khomeynishahr County) =

District in Isfahan province, Iran

Central District (Khomeynishahr County) Persian: بخش مرکزی شهرستان خميني شهر
- District
- Location within Iran
- Coordinates: 32°41′N 51°30′E
- Country: Iran
- Province: Isfahan
- County: Khomeynishahr
- Capital: Khomeynishahr

Population (2016)
  - Total: 319,727
- Time zone: UTC+3:30 (IRST)

The Central District of Khomeynishahr County (Persian: بخش مرکزی شهرستان خميني شهر) is in Isfahan province, Iran. Its capital is the city of Khomeynishahr.

== History ==
The village of Asgharabad was converted to a city in 2011.

== Demographics ==
=== Population ===
At the time of the 2006 National Census, the district's population was 282,888 in 75,305 households. The following census in 2011 counted 311,629 people in 90,735 households. The 2016 census measured the population of the district as 319,727 inhabitants in 98,269 households.

=== Administrative divisions ===
Central District (Khomeynishahr County) Population
Administrative Divisions	2006	2011	2016
Marbin-e Olya RD	8,432	8,951	3,122
Marbin-e Sofla RD		(Note: Below the reporting threshold)	0
Marbin-e Vosta RD	1,272	1,262	1,553
Asgharabad (city)			6,876
Dorcheh (city) (Note: Formerly known as Dorcheh Piaz)	43,183	44,689	47,800
Khomeynishahr (city)	218,737	244,696	247,128
Kushk (city)	11,264	12,029	13,248
Total	282,888	311,629	319,727
RD = Rural District
