= Dorcheh, Lorestan =

Village in Lorestan province, Iran

Dorcheh Persian: درچه
- Village
- Country: Iran
- Province: Lorestan
- County: Aligudarz
- District: Zaz and Mahru
- Rural District: Zaz-e Gharbi

Population (2016)
  - Total: 98
- Time zone: UTC+3:30 (IRST)

Dorcheh (Persian: درچه) (Note: Also known as Darreh Cheh (دره چه)) is a village in Zaz-e Gharbi Rural District of Zaz and Mahru District in Aligudarz County, Lorestan province, Iran.

== Demographics ==
=== Population ===
At the time of the 2006 National Census, the village's population was 45 in six households. The following census in 2011 counted 54 people in 14 households. The 2016 census measured the population of the village as 98 people in 25 households.
