= Dowlatabad, Borkhar =

City in Isfahan province, Iran

Dowlatabad Persian: دولت آباد
- City
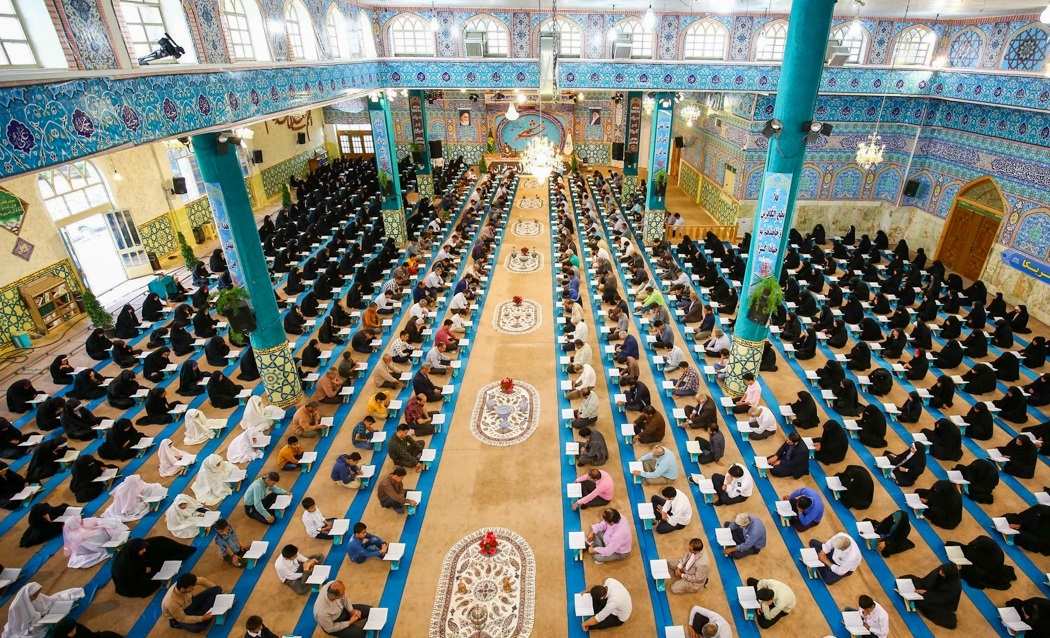
- Ramadan Quran reading, Dowlatabad

- Location within Iran
- Coordinates: 32°48′01″N 51°41′45″E
- Country: Iran
- Province: Isfahan
- County: Borkhar
- District: Central

Population (2016)
  - Total: 40,945
- Time zone: UTC+3:30 (IRST)

Dowlatabad (Persian: دولت آباد) (Note: Also romanized as Daulatābād and Dowlatābād) is a city in the Central District of Borkhar County, Isfahan province, Iran, serving as capital of both the county and the district.

== Demographics ==
=== Population ===
At the time of the 2006 National Census, the city's population was 33,941 in 8,661 households, when it was capital of the former Borkhar District in Borkhar and Meymeh County. (Note: Renamed Shahinshahr and Meymeh County and again renamed Shahinshahr County) The following census in 2011 counted 37,098 people in 10,489 households, by which time the district had been separated from the county in the establishment of Borkhar County. Dowlatabad was transferred to the new Central District as the county's capital. The 2016 census measured the population of the city as 40,945 people in 12,350 households.
