= Habibabad, Isfahan =

City in Isfahan province, Iran

Habibabad Persian: حبيب آباد
- City
- Location within Iran
- Coordinates: 32°49′48″N 51°46′27″E
- Country: Iran
- Province: Isfahan
- County: Borkhar
- District: Habibabad

Population (2016)
  - Total: 9,491
- Time zone: UTC+3:30 (IRST)

Habibabad (Persian: حبيب آباد) (Note: Also romanized as Ḩabībābād) is a city in, and the capital of, Habibabad District in Borkhar County, Isfahan province, Iran.

== Demographics ==
=== Population ===
At the time of the 2006 National Census, the city's population was 9,078 in 2,403 households, when it was in the former Borkhar District of Borkhar and Meymeh County. (Note: Renamed Shahinshahr and Meymeh County and again renamed Shahinshahr County) The following census in 2011 counted 9,444 people in 2,806 households, by which time the district had been separated from the county in the establishment of Borkhar County. Habibabad was transferred to the new Habibabad District. The 2016 census measured the population of the city as 9,491 people in 3,005 households.
