= Shahinshahr =

City in Isfahan province, Iran

Shahinshahr Persian: شاهین‌شهر
- City
- Location within Iran
- Coordinates: 32°51′38″N 51°33′11″E
- Country: Iran
- Province: Isfahan
- County: Shahinshahr
- District: Central
- Elevation: 1,662 m (5,453 ft)

Population (2016)
  - Total: 173,329
- Time zone: UTC+3:30 (IRST)
- Website: www.shaahinshahr.com

Shahinshahr (Persian: شاهین‌شهر) (Note: Also romanized as Shahin Shahr and Shāhīn Shahr) is a city in the Central District of Shahinshahr County, (Note: Formerly Borkhar and Meymeh County and then renamed Shahinshahr and Meymeh County) Isfahan province, Iran, serving as capital of both the county and the district.

Shahinshahr was Iran's first master-planned satellite city, approximately 15 miles (24 km) to the north of Isfahan, Iran's second-largest metropolitan area and its historic capital. A high proportion of the residents are displaced Iran-Iraq war refugees originally from Khuzestan. The city's original plan envisioned 50,000 homes and a maximum population of 250,000. The city currently ranks among the 50 largest in Iran.

== History ==
=== Foundation ===
The city was founded in the mid to late 1960s when six brothers from the Boroumand family decided that it was more economical for them to transform the 40 million square meter (10,000 acre) Amirabad farm that they had inherited from their father, Agha Muḥammad Khān Boroumand, from agricultural usage to a mix of residential development and agricultural usage. The main drivers for this decision were the proximity of their farm to Esfahan, the availability of plentiful water from the "qanat", or underground canal system that their father had salvaged and upgraded during his lifetime, and the demand for affordable housing. The Boroumand brothers proceeded to incorporate the Sherkat Omran Shahinshahr, and with initial funding from Bank Taavoni Va Tozie (now a part of Bank Mellat) began the process of developing the city's infrastructure, including its roads, sewers, water, and electricity. As development and construction progressed, the enterprise, under the supervision of Abdol Ghafar, Abdol Rahim, Abdol Karim and Abdol Rashid Boroumand, employed in excess of 10,000 people including accountants, engineers, architects, and laborers, and proceeded to build over 10,000 affordable homes and to provide homes to over 50,000 residents. The master plan for the expanded new town for 300,000 people was prepared by Peter Verity the international urbanist and architect (PDR consultants) who also prepared the detailed designs for several of the planned residential areas and a range of public buildings.

=== Growth ===
To further attract residents, the Boroumand brothers gifted over 2 million square meters (500 acres) of land in close proximity to the city to the Daneshgah Sanati Esfahan, Isfahan University of Technology (IUT), and gifted another 2 million square meters (500 acres) of land in the city to the Iranian government with the understanding that the government would build a manufacturing facility there (a helicopter manufacturing plant which was to have been built there prior to the Iranian Revolution, is now home to the Iran Aircraft Manufacturing Industrial Company (HESA.))

In the 1970s, numerous American and other foreign expatriates working under contract to the Iranian government and the Iranian military resided in Shahinshahr in a walled and gated compound. The Toufanian High School building of the American School of Isfahan (now a satellite campus of Malek Ashtar University) was located at the northern tip of the city.

=== Recent history ===
Shahinshahr is renowned in Iran for its excellent educational facilities and system, ranking 2nd in the whole country, a legacy of the first class schools originally built. Shahinshahr is currently home to many employees of governmental organizations, such as the National Iranian Oil Company, and a variety of educational organizations. The majority of the population is from a middle-class background, and work in a range of industries including military, refineries, aerospace production as well as typical office and retail jobs. It is the most diverse city in Iran as a result of the large population of migrants. It is also popular with non-Muslim Iranians such as people following the Baháʼí Faith and second generation Armenians (Christians).

== Demographics ==
=== Population ===
At the time of the 2006 National Census, the city's population was 126,070 in 33,515 households. The following census in 2011 counted 143,308 people in 41,730 households. The 2016 census measured the population of the city as 173,329 people in 54,300 households.

== Geography ==
The city is among the central mountain ranges of Iran to the east of the Zagros Mountains. It has an altitude of 1662 meters on average with a slope of 16%. It has a dry climate with very little precipitation. The variation in temperature is about 50 degrees Celsius.
