= Borkhar-e Markazi Rural District =

Rural district in Isfahan province, Iran

Borkhar-e Markazi Rural District Persian: دهستان برخوار مركزی
- Rural District
- Location within Iran
- Coordinates: 33°00′N 51°43′E
- Country: Iran
- Province: Isfahan
- County: Borkhar
- District: Central
- Established: 1999
- Capital: Mohsenabad

Population (2016)
  - Total: 4,271
- Time zone: UTC+3:30 (IRST)

Borkhar-e Markazi Rural District (Persian: دهستان برخوار مركزی) is in the Central District of Borkhar County, Isfahan province, Iran. Its capital is the village of Mohsenabad. The previous capital of the rural district was the village of Shapurabad, now a city.

== Demographics ==
=== Population ===
At the time of the 2006 National Census, the rural district's population (as a part of the former Borkhar District in Borkhar and Meymeh County) (Note: Renamed Shahinshahr and Meymeh County and again renamed Shahinshahr County) was 8,721 in 2,216 households. There were 3,821 inhabitants in 1,140 households at the following census of 2011, by which time the district had been separated from the county in the establishment of Borkhar County. The rural district was transferred to the new Central District. The 2016 census measured the population of the rural district as 4,271 in 1,318 households. The most populous of its 23 villages was Mohsenabad, with 4,217 people.
