= Gaz-e Borkhar =

City in Isfahan province, Iran

Gaz-e Borkhar Persian: گز برخوار
- City
- Location within Iran
- Coordinates: 32°48′22″N 51°37′14″E
- Country: Iran
- Province: Isfahan
- County: Shahinshahr
- District: Central

Population (2016)
  - Total: 24,433
- Time zone: UTC+3:30 (IRST)

Gaz-e Borkhar (Persian: گز برخوار) (Note: Formerly Gaz; also known as Jaz) is a city in the Central District of Shahinshahr County, (Note: Formerly Borkhar and Meymeh County and then renamed Shahinshahr and Meymeh County) Isfahan province, Iran. The city is the birthplace of Adib Boroumand, who is the founder of a cultural center in the city.

== History ==
Gaz-e Borkhar dates back more than two thousand years ago. The texture of the city is old and has been traditionally built, but in recent years there has been changes and the new architectural style has become commonplace. Hamdullah Mostofi writes in the book of Nuzhat al-Qulub: "Bahman bin Esfandiar has built a ten-fireplace." The fireplace seems to have become a mosque after the Arab invasion of Iran and the influence of Islam in the city.

== Demographics ==
=== Dialect and local language ===
The dialect and the language of the Gazi dialect, the old Fars as a part of the four Pahlavi or the city (urban), provincial (rural), beetle (cut and short), and a door related to expression, plains, valleys and deserts. This language has gradually been influenced by the Persian language and script since the 11th century AH, but at present, it is an ancient and original language and in terms of writing without Persian and Arabic alphabets and their Arabs. It has been effective and studied by German experts and culturalists such as Wilhelm Ilors (4-5 AD) because of its similarities in some words with the German language dialect and some European and even Greece. As he mentioned, when he was in the German Archaeological Foundation in Isfahan (1-5 AH) and then in the solar decade he tried to record the language. He released the collection with the help of Ulrich Shapka in two exquisite volumes in Germany, titled "Westiranische Mundarten Aus der Sammlung Wilhelm Eilers".

This language appeared on the list of intangible heritage works on February 21, 2009 under the name "Gazi Dialect". The Divine Dervish Abbas Gazi has been published in the local language. This book contains about 2 sonnets.

=== Population ===
At the time of the 2006 National Census, the city's population was 20,432 in 5,704 households. The following census in 2011 counted 21,991 people in 6,710 households. The 2016 census measured the population of the city as 24,433 people in 7,768 households.

== Geography ==
=== Location ===
The historic city of Gaz is located in a relatively flat plain that lacks natural effects. The city is 18 kilometers north of Isfahan.

=== Climate ===
In terms of climate, it is a semidesert climate. Its rainfall and its evaporation is less than the city of Isfahan. The soils of the area are generally made of clay with relatively high adhesion with a little sand.

== Historical monuments ==
=== Grand Mosque of Gaz (Masjed Jame or Mached Balle) ===
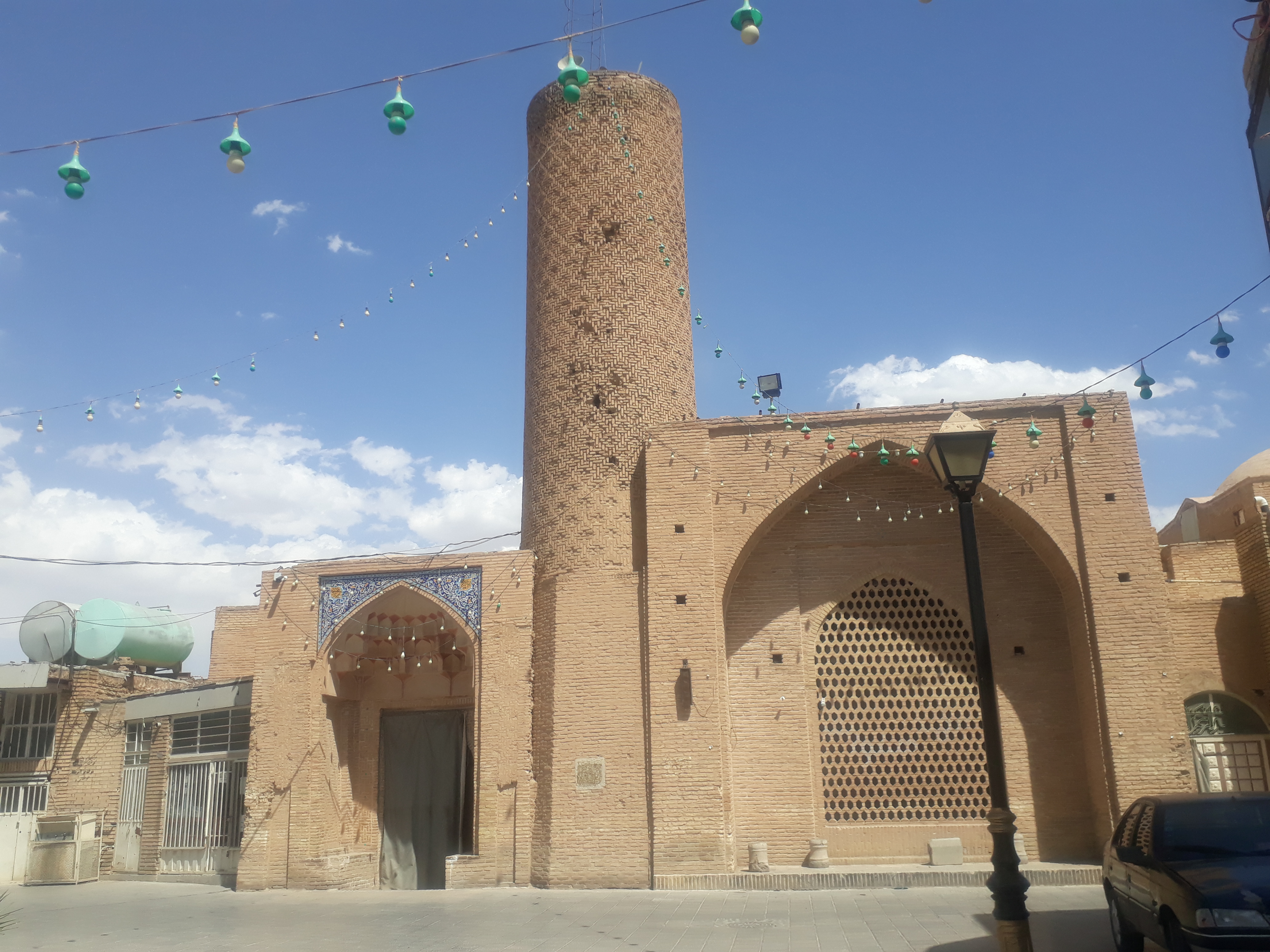
Grand Mosque of Gaz

The Grand Mosque of Gaz is a small four-porch mosque of the Seljuk period (the sixth century) that has been damaged and renovated in the next session, but has retained a large amount of its Seljuk characteristics. The northern, southern, east and west porches in this mosque are two to two mirrors, with a square and its length and width of about 2 meters. The Seljuk works of this mosque are on its western porch and there are two current corridors of the mosque on both sides of the porch. In each of the northern and southern sides, the porch is at an in height of two and a half meters.

=== Abbasi Caravanserai of Gaz ===
One of the interesting examples of the caravanserai of Shah Abbas I, built on the road to Isfahan to the north, is the Gaz inn. The length of this historic inn from the east to the east is 2 meters and its width from north to south and 2 meters in the inn from the east to forty meters and its width from north to south is 2 meters. In the four corners of the inn, there are four other towers whose views are visible from afar and used for observation. The magnificent height of the Gaz Inns is eleven meters and its exterior includes upper and lower porches with rational tiles and roofs. The upper part of the caravanserai entrance also has some interesting decorations of reasonable tile.

=== Agha Mahmoud Mosque ===
One of the old brick and old works of Gaz, a rectangular mosque, is about 2 meters wide and 2 meters long, which was built at the entrance of the old market, and seems to be one of the late Safavid architectural artifacts. He was built by a person named Agha Mahmoud.

=== Adib Borumand cultural center ===
Adib Boroumand Cultural Center was founded in 2001 by the national poet of Iran Adib Boroumand to provide a special service to his hometown. This cultural center has been called the Adib Boroumand Cultural Center at the discretion of the Board of Trustees of this Foundation and the City Council. The location of an old building is about 5 years old and an area of 2 square meters. In the northern part of the earth there is a plaster hall and a monarchy with two pens and on both sides of the two coordinate and continuous arches. On the eastern part of a large basin and a small veil is located in the western part of a large room with two smaller rooms. In addition, on the western side of a corridor leads to a basement where the Museum of Anthropology is now deployed. In the courtyard of the mansion, the blue pond is built in the middle of the building and opposite the hall, and its water flows into the south with multiple foams. The building was actually part of the Qajar mansion by Haj Mohammad Ali Khan Kalantar, the son of Ali Akbar Big Governor of Fath Ali Shah Qajar, which included two outer sections (current cultural center), Androni and the caravanserai (about 5,000 square meters). Gaz Borkhar Cultural Center was one of the historic houses of Boroumand in Gaz Borkhar owned by Mr. Heydar Ali Khan Boroumand and is currently named "Adib Boroumand Cultural Center".

== Agriculture ==
It has been famous for the past because of the fertile agricultural soil of the city of Gaz. The presence of numerous amenities in the area indicates a long and prolific people in agriculture. But due to consecutive droughts and the drilling of deep wells in the area close to the origin of the cannabis, and due to the lack of preservation and dredging, the city has suffered dehydration and stagnation of farmers. And the family is booming in the city of Gaz. Its major agricultural products produced in the past include: cereals, sugar beets, especially melons. Tree products include the cultivation of trees such as pistachios and grapes.

== Economy ==
=== Industry ===
Due to the high quality clay in the city and due to the antiquity of the city, the city has long been a center of construction and preparation of pottery and materials, which specimen of the Parthian and Sassanid era and the discovered archaeological excavations on the hill. The ancient Gaz, dating back to the pre-Islamic era, is available in the Museum of Anthropology, as well as the multiplicity of pottery containers in recent decades, some of which have been available in the museum.

But over time, the pottery industry in Gaz has moved more towards building materials and all brick products have become in various types, which has led to the city's brick kilns with about 70 automatic and hand-made factory. The Gaz city will become one of the hubs of Iran's brick industry, and according to officials and experts, about 20% of Iran's bricks will be produced in the city, which is exported to most countries in addition to domestic construction.

=== Automobile exhibitions ===
The city of Gaz, with about seventy exhibitions of domestic and foreign crafts, has become one of the country's car shopping hubs.

== See also ==
- Gazi Language
- Adib Boromand
- Isfahan
