= Habibabad District =

District in Isfahan province, Iran

Habibabad District Persian: بخش حبیب آباد
- District
- Location within Iran
- Coordinates: 33°01′N 51°54′E
- Country: Iran
- Province: Isfahan
- County: Borkhar
- Established: 2007
- Capital: Habibabad

Population (2016)
  - Total: 24,741
- Time zone: UTC+3:30 (IRST)

Habibabad District (Persian: بخش حبیب آباد) is in Borkhar County, Isfahan province, Iran. Its capital is the city of Habibabad.

== History ==
In 2007, Borkhar District was separated from Borkhar and Meymeh County (Note: Renamed Shahinshahr and Meymeh County and again renamed Shahinshahr County) in the establishment of Borkhar County, which was divided into two districts of two rural districts each, with Dowlatabad as its capital.

== Demographics ==
=== Population ===
At the time of the 2011 National Census, the district's population was 23,640 people in 6,906 households. The 2016 census measured the population of the district as 24,741 inhabitants in 7,765 households.

=== Administrative divisions ===
Habibabad District Population
Administrative Divisions	2011	2016
Borkhar-e Sharqi RD	3,670	4,138
Shapurabad RD	168	97
Habibabad (city)	9,444	9,491
Komeshcheh (city)	4,871	5,100
Shapurabad (city)	5,487	5,915
Total	23,640	24,741
RD = Rural District
