= Khomeynishahr County =

County in Isfahan province, Iran

Khomeynishahr County Persian: شهرستان خمینی‌شهر
- County
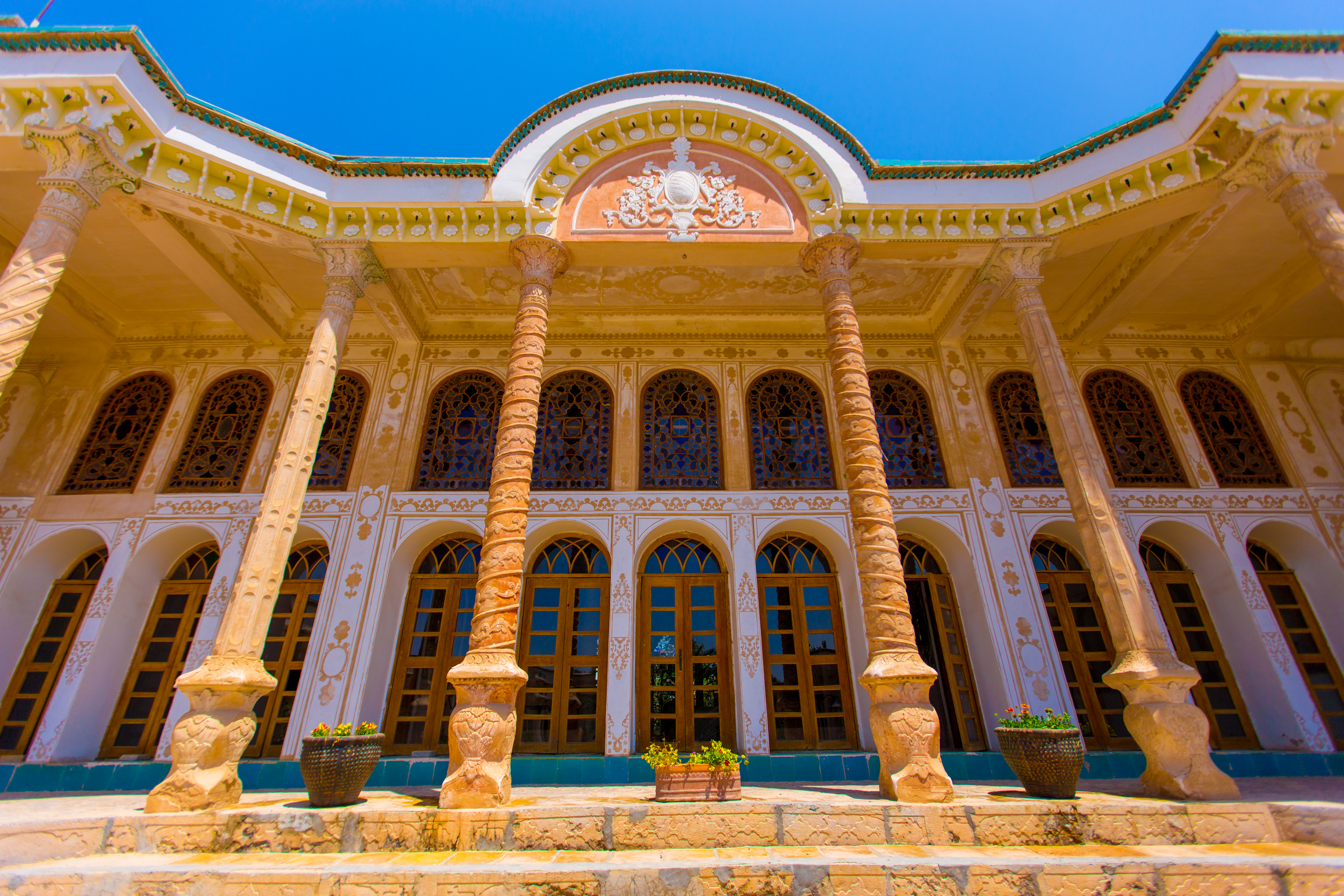
- Sartip Sedehi Historical House

- Location of Khomeynishahr County in Isfahan province (center, purple)

- Location of Isfahan province in Iran
- Coordinates: 32°41′N 51°30′E
- Country: Iran
- Province: Isfahan
- Capital: Khomeynishahr
- Districts: Central

Population (2016)
  - Total: 319,727
- Time zone: UTC+3:30 (IRST)

Khomeynishahr County (Persian: شهرستان خمینی‌شهر) is in Isfahan province, Iran. Its capital is the city of Khomeynishahr.

== History ==
The village of Asgharabad was converted to a city in 2011.

== Demographics ==
=== Population ===
At the time of the 2006 National Census, the county's population was 282,888 in 57,551 households. The following census in 2011 counted 311,629 people in 90,715 households. The 2016 census measured the population of the county as 319,727 in 98,269 households.

=== Administrative divisions ===
Khomeynishahr County's population history and administrative structure over three consecutive censuses are shown in the following table.

Khomeynishahr County Population
Administrative Divisions	2006	2011	2016
Central District	282,888	311,629	319,727
Marbin-e Olya RD	8,432	8,951	3,122
Marbin-e Sofla RD		(Note: Below the reporting threshold)	0
Marbin-e Vosta RD	1,272	1,262	1,553
Asgharabad (city)			6,876
Dorcheh (city) (Note: Formerly known as Dorcheh Piaz)	43,183	44,689	47,800
Khomeynishahr (city)	218,737	244,696	247,128
Kushk (city)	11,264	12,029	13,248
Total	282,888	311,629	319,727
RD = Rural District

== See also ==
Media related to Khomeyni Shahr County at Wikimedia Commons
