= Borkhar County =

County in Isfahan province, Iran

Borkhar County Persian: شهرستان برخوار
- County
- Location of Borkhar County in Isfahan province (center right, pink)

- Location of Isfahan province in Iran
- Coordinates: 33°00′N 51°45′E
- Country: Iran
- Province: Isfahan
- Established: 2007
- Capital: Dowlatabad
- Districts: Central, Habibabad

Population (2016)
  - Total: 122,419
- Time zone: UTC+3:30 (IRST)

Borkhar County (Persian: شهرستان برخوار) is in Isfahan province, Iran. Its capital is the city of Dowlatabad.

== History ==
In 2007, Borkhar District was separated from Borkhar and Meymeh County (Note: Renamed Shahinshahr and Meymeh County and again renamed Shahinshahr County) in the establishment of Borkhar County, which was divided into two districts of two rural districts each, with Dowlatabad as its capital. The village of Sin was converted to a city in 2011.

== Demographics ==
=== Population ===
At the time of the 2011 National Census, the county's population was 108,933 people in 31,562 households. The 2016 census measured the population of the county as 122,419 in 37,623 households.

=== Administrative divisions ===
Borkhar County's population history and administrative structure over two consecutive censuses are shown in the following table.

Borkhar County Population
Administrative Divisions	2011	2016
Central District	85,293	97,678
Borkhar-e Markazi RD	3,821	4,271
Sin RD	5,205	38
Dastgerd (city)	16,848	17,775
Dowlatabad (city)	37,098	40,945
Khvorzuq (city)	22,321	29,154
Sin (city)		5,495
Habibabad District	23,640	24,741
Borkhar-e Sharqi RD	3,670	4,138
Shapurabad RD	168	97
Habibabad (city)	9,444	9,491
Komeshcheh (city)	4,871	5,100
Shapurabad (city)	5,487	5,915
Total	108,933	122,419
RD = Rural District

== See also ==
Media related to Borkhar County at Wikimedia Commons
