= Central District (Shahinshahr County) =

District in Isfahan province, Iran

Central District (Shahinshahr County) Persian: بخش مرکزی شهرستان شاهین‌شهر
- District
- Location within Iran
- Coordinates: 33°08′N 51°22′E
- Country: Iran
- Province: Isfahan
- County: Shahinshahr
- Capital: Shahinshahr

Population (2016)
  - Total: 211,606
- Time zone: UTC+3:30 (IRST)

The Central District of Shahinshahr County (Persian: بخش مرکزی شهرستان شاهین‌شهر) (Note: Formerly Borkhar and Meymeh County and then renamed Shahinshahr and Meymeh County) is in Isfahan province, Iran. Its capital is the city of Shahinshahr.

== History ==
In 2007, the village of Gorgab was converted to a city.

== Demographics ==
=== Population ===
At the time of the 2006 National Census, the district's population was 160,903 in 43,078 households. The following census in 2011 counted 175,886 people in 51,664 households. The 2016 census measured the population of the district as 211,606 inhabitants in 66,338 households.

=== Administrative divisions ===
Central District (Shahinshahr County) Population
Administrative Divisions	2006	2011	2016
Borkhar-e Gharbi RD	11,525	1,965	1,956
Murcheh Khvort RD	2,876	2,263	2,198
Gaz-e Borkhar (city) (Note: Formerly Gaz)	20,432	21,991	24,433
Gorgab (city)		6,359	9,690
Shahinshahr (city)	126,070	143,308	173,329
Total	160,903	175,886	211,606
RD = Rural District
