= Borkhar District =

Former district in Isfahan province, Iran

Borkhar District Persian: بخش برخوار
- Former District
- Location within Iran
- Coordinates: 33°00′N 51°45′E
- Country: Iran
- Province: Isfahan
- County: Borkhar and Meymeh
- Capital: Dowlatabad

Population (2006)
  - Total: 95,389
- Time zone: UTC+3:30 (IRST)

Borkhar District (Persian: بخش برخوار) is a former administrative division of Borkhar and Meymeh County, (Note: Renamed Shahinshahr and Meymeh County and then Shahinshahr County) Isfahan province, Iran. Its capital was the city of Dowlatabad.

== History ==
In 2007, the district was separated from the county in the establishment of Borkhar County.

== Demographics ==
=== Population ===
At the time of the 2006 National Census, the district's population was 95,389 in 24,739 households.

=== Administrative divisions ===
Borkhar District Population
Administrative Divisions	2006
Borkhar-e Markazi RD	8,721
Borkhar-e Sharqi RD	3,429
Dastgerd (city)	15,524
Dowlatabad (city)	33,941
Habibabad (city)	9,078
Khvorzuq (city)	20,301
Komeshcheh (city)	4,395
Total	95,389
RD = Rural District
