= Shahinshahr County =

County in Isfahan province, Iran

Shahinshahr County Persian: شهرستان شاهین‌شهر
- County
- Location of Shahinshahr County in Isfahan province (top left, yellow)

- Location of Isfahan province in Iran
- Coordinates: 33°08′N 51°22′E
- Country: Iran
- Province: Isfahan
- Capital: Shahinshahr
- Districts: Central

Population (2016)
  - Total: 234,667
- Time zone: UTC+3:30 (IRST)

Shahinshahr County (Persian: شهرستان شاهین‌شهر) (Note: Formerly Borkhar and Meymeh County (شهرستان برخوار و میمه) and then Shahinshahr and Meymeh County (شهرستان شاهین‌شهر و میمه)) is in Isfahan province, Iran. Its capital is the city of Shahinshahr.

== History ==
In 2007, the villages of Gorgab and Laybid were converted to cities, and Borkhar District was separated from the county in the establishment of Borkhar County. In 2024, Meymeh District (Note: Renamed the Central District of Meymeh and Vazvan County) was separated from the county in the establishment of Meymeh and Vazvan County and renamed the Central District.

== Demographics ==
=== Population ===
At the time of the 2006 National Census, the county's population was 277,783 in 74,103 households. The following census in 2011 counted 196,584 people in 58,162 households. The 2016 census measured the population of the county as 234,667 in 73,981 households.

=== Administrative divisions ===
Shahinshahr County's population history and administrative structure over three consecutive censuses are shown in the following table.

Shahinshahr County Population (Note: As Borkhar and Meymeh County at the 2006 census, and Shahinshahr and Meymeh County at the 2011 and 2016 censuses)
| Administrative Divisions | 2006 | 2011 | 2016 |
|---|---|---|---|
| Central District | 160,903 | 175,886 | 211,606 |
| Borkhar-e Gharbi RD | 11,525 | 1,965 | 1,956 |
| Murcheh Khvort RD | 2,876 | 2,263 | 2,198 |
| Gaz-e Borkhar (city) (Note: Formerly Gaz) | 20,432 | 21,991 | 24,433 |
| Gorgab (city) | | 6,359 | 9,690 |
| Shahinshahr (city) | 126,070 | 143,308 | 173,329 |
| Borkhar District (Note: Transferred to Borkhar County after the 2006 census) | 95,389 | | |
| Borkhar-e Markazi RD | 8,721 | | |
| Borkhar-e Sharqi RD | 3,429 | | |
| Dastgerd (city) | 15,524 | | |
| Dowlatabad (city) | 33,941 | | |
| Habibabad (city) | 9,078 | | |
| Khvorzuq (city) | 20,301 | | |
| Komeshcheh (city) | 4,395 | | |
| Meymeh District (Note: Transferred to Meymeh and Vazvan County after the 2016 census and renamed the Central District) | 21,491 | 20,698 | 23,057 |
| Vandadeh RD | 5,756 | 6,322 | 6,605 |
| Zarkan RD | 5,341 | 2,895 | 3,017 |
| Laybid (city) | | 1,473 | 1,832 |
| Meymeh (city) | 5,733 | 5,449 | 5,651 |
| Vazvan (city) | 4,661 | 4,559 | 5,952 |
| Total | 277,783 | 196,584 | 234,667 |
RD = Rural District

== See also ==
Media related to Shahin Shahr County at Wikimedia Commons
