= Golian =

Golian or Goliyan or Golyan or Gelian or Geliyan or Gelyan (Persian: گليان) may refer to:

== India ==
- Golian, India

== Iran ==
- Goliyan, Hamadan
- Geliyan, Kurdistan
- Gelian, Mazandaran
- Golian, North Khorasan
- Golian, South Khorasan
- Golian Rural District, in North Khorasan Province

== Nepal ==
- Golyan Group
- Akshay Golyan, Kathmandu
- Pawan Golyan, Kathmandu
- Shakti Golyan, Kathmandu
- Ananta Golyan, Kathmandu
- Hyatt Place Kathmandu, in Province 2, Kathmandu, Nepal

== Persons ==
- Ján Golian (1906–1945), Slovak Brigadier General
