= Gulian =

Gulian may refer to:

- Gulian, Heilongjiang, a town in Mohe, Heilongjiang Province, China
  - Gulian Airport
- Gulian C. Verplanck (1786-1870), American politician
- Gulian Verplanck (speaker) (1751-1799), American politician
- Mount Gulian, a manor house in New York

== See also ==
- Golian (disambiguation)
- Guliana (disambiguation)
- Giuliani, a surname
