= Juliano (given name) =

Juliano is a masculine given name. Notable people with the given name include the following:

== Footballers ==
- Juliano Silva Almeida (born 1994), Brazilian footballer known as Juliano
- Juca (footballer, born 1979) nickname for Juliano Roberto Antonello (born 1979), Brazilian footballer
- Juliano Belletti (born 1976), Brazilian footballer
- Juliano Chade (born 1998), Brazilian footballer known as Juliano
- Juliano Rangel de Andrade (born 1982), Brazilian football
- Juliano de Paula (born 1981), Brazilian footballer
- Juliano André Pereira da Silva (born 1986), Brazilian footballer known as Juliano
- Juliano Laurentino dos Santos (born 1985), Brazilian footballer known as Roma
- Juliano Pescarolo Martins (born 1974), Brazilian footballer known as Paquito
- Juliano Mineiro (born 1986), Brazilian footballer
- Juliano Real Pacheco (born 1990), Brazilian footballer known as Juliano
- Juliano Gomes Soares (born 1983), Brazilian footballer known as Juliano
- Juliano Spadacio (born 1980), Brazilian footballer
- Juliano Vicentini (born 1981), Brazilian footballer

== Other athletes ==
- Juliano Fiori (born 1985), Brazilian rugby player
- Juliano Máquina (born 1993), Mozambican boxer
- Juliano Moro (born 1977), Brazilian racing driver

== Arts ==
- Juliano Cazarré (born 1980), Brazilian actor
- Julianos Kattinis, Greek painter
- Juliano Mer-Khamis (1958 – 2011), Israeli Jewish/Palestinian Arab actor, director, filmmaker, and political activist
- Juliano Ribeiro Salgado (born 1974), Brazilian filmmaker, director, and writer
- Juliano Son (born 1973), Brazilian Christian singer, songwriter, missionary and worship pastor

== Other ==
- Juliano Moreira (1872 – 1933), Afro-Brazilian psychiatrist

== See also ==
- Juliano (disambiguation)
- Juliano (surname)
- Giuliano
- Giulio
- Guliano Diaz
- Julian (name)
- Julio (given name)
