= Zangian =

Zangian or Zangiyan or Zangeyan (Persian: زنگيان) may refer to:

- Zangian, Golestan
- Zangian, Kerman
- Zangian, Mazandaran
- Zangian, Sistan and Baluchestan
