= Giuliano =

Giuliano (Italian pronunciation: [dʒuˈljaːno]) is an Italian name which is typically an equivalent of Julian, or in some cases a locative name from such places as Giuliano di Roma or Giuliano Teatino. A patronymic or pluralized surname derived from Giuliano is Giuliani.

Notable people with the name include:

== In arts and entertainment ==
=== Given name ===
- Giuliano Pesello (ca. 1367–1446), Italian painter
- Giuliano da Sangallo (ca. 1445–1516), Italian sculptor and architect
- Giuliano Gemma (1938–2013), Italian actor
- Giuliano Đanić (born 1973), Croatian pop-folk singer

=== Surname ===
- Geoffrey Giuliano (born 1953), American actor and author
- Giuseppe Giuliano (born 1951), Italian Roman Catholic bishop
- Maurizio Giuliano (born 1975), Italian-British author and Guinness record-holding traveller

== In crime ==
- Salvatore Giuliano (1922–1950), Sicilian bandit
- Luigi Giuliano (born 1949), former Neapolitan Camorra boss and pentito

== In politics ==
=== Given name ===
- Giuliano Urbani (born 1937), former Italian minister of cultural heritage
- Giuliano Amato (born 1938), former prime minister of Italy
- Giuliano Poletti (born 1951), former Italian minister of labour and social policies

=== Surname ===
- Gaetano Giuliano (1929–2023), Italian politician
- Sebastian Giuliano (born 1952), former mayor of Middletown, Connecticut, US
- Neil Giuliano (born 1956), former mayor of Tempe, Arizona, US
- Carla Giuliano (born 1983), Italian politician

== In religion ==
- Giuliano Cesarini (1398–1444), Italian Catholic cardinal
- Pope Julius II (1443–1513), born Giuliano della Rovere
- Giuliano Cesarini (1466–1510), Italian Catholic cardinal

== In sport ==
=== Given name ===
- Giuliano Alesi (born 1999), French racing driver
- Giuliano Avaca (born 2003), Argentine rugby union player
- Giuliano Battocletti (born 1975), Italian long-distance runner
- Giuliano Besson (1950–2025), Italian alpine skier
- Giuliano Calore (born 1938), Italian cyclist
- Giuliano de Paula (born 1990), Brazilian footballer
- Giuliano Galoppo (born 1999), Argentine footballer
- Giuliano Melosi (born 1967), Italian footballer
- Giuliano Simeone (born 2002), Argentine footballer

=== Surname ===
- Luigi Giuliano (1930–1993), Italian footballer
- Carmelo Giuliano (born 1951), Argentine footballer
- Jeff Giuliano (born 1979), American ice hockey player

== In other fields ==
=== Given name ===
- Giuliano de' Medici (1453–1478), Florentine nobleman
- Giuliano de' Medici (1479–1516), Florentine nobleman
- Giuliano Pancaldi (born 1946), Italian historian of science
- Giuliano Marrucci (born 1976), Italian investigative journalist

=== Surname ===
- Mark F. Giuliano (1961–2024), American law enforcement official
- Armando E. Giuliano (born 1947), American oncologist and surgeon scientist

== See also ==
- Giuliano e i Notturni
- Giuliani
- Giulio (disambiguation)
- Guiliano (name)
- Julian (given name)
- Julian (surname)
- Juliano (given name)
- San Giuliano (disambiguation)
