= Mashhad Torqi =

Mashhad Torqi or Mashhad Tarqi (Persian: مشهدطرقي) may refer to:

- Mashhad Torqi-ye Olya
- Mashhad Torqi-ye Sofla
