= Juliano (surname) =

Juliano is a surname. Notable people with the surname include:

== Sports ==
- Álvaro Juliano (born 1991), Brazilian footballer
- Antonio Juliano (1943–2023), Italian footballer

== Arts ==
- Auguste Pilati Juliano (1810–1877), French composer
- Jamian Juliano-Villani (born 1987), American painter
- Otávio Juliano (born 1972), Brazilian filmmaker

== Crime ==
- Anthony Michael Juliano (1922 – 2001), American thief
- Joseph Juliano (born 1938), American mobster

== Science ==
- Jonathan J Juliano, American scientist
- Jose Juliano, Filipino scientist
- María Dolores Juliano (1932–2022), Argentine anthropologist

== See also ==
- Juliano (disambiguation)
- Juliano (given name)
- Giuliano
- Julian (surname)
- Julio (surname)
