= 2018 Copa do Brasil First Stage =

Brazilian football tournament stage

The 2018 Copa do Brasil first stage was the first stage of the 2018 Copa do Brasil football competition. It was played from 30 January to 7 February 2018. A total of 80 teams competed in the first stage to decide 40 places in the second stage of the 2018 Copa do Brasil.

== Draw ==
The draw for the first and second stage was held on 15 December 2017, 15:00 at CBF headquarters in Rio de Janeiro. Teams were seeded by their CBF ranking (shown in parentheses). The 80 qualified teams were divided in eight groups (A-H) with 10 teams each. The matches were drawn from the respective confronts: A vs. E; B vs. F; C vs. G; D vs. H. The lower ranked teams hosted the first stage match.

Group A	Group B	Group C	Group D
(Minas Gerais) Atlético Mineiro (5); (Rio de Janeiro (state)) Botafogo (8); (Paraná (state)) Atlético Paranaense (9); (Rio Grande do Sul) Internacional (10); (São Paulo (state)) São Paulo (11); (Rio de Janeiro (state)) Fluminense (12); (Pernambuco) Sport (15); (São Paulo (state)) Ponte Preta (16); (Paraná (state)) Coritiba (17); (Bahia) Vitória (18)	(Santa Catarina (state)) Figueirense (19); (Goiás) Atlético Goianiense (20); Goiás (22); (Santa Catarina (state)) Avaí (23); (Pernambuco) Santa Cruz (25); (Pará) Paysandu (26); Ceará (27); (Paraná (state)) Paraná (28); (Santa Catarina (state)) Criciúma (29); (Santa Catarina (state)) Joinville (30)	(Rio Grande do Norte) ABC (31); (Pernambuco) Náutico (32); (Rio Grande do Sul) Juventude (33); (São Paulo (state)) Bragantino (35); (Alagoas) CRB (36); (São Paulo (state)) Oeste (37); (Minas Gerais) Boa Esporte (38); (Maranhão) Sampaio Corrêa (39); (Paraná (state)) Londrina (40); (Goiás) Vila Nova (41)	(Rio Grande do Norte) América de Natal (43); (Paraíba) Botafogo (45); (Alagoas) ASA (47); (Mato Grosso) Cuiabá (50); (Pernambuco) Salgueiro (51); (Sergipe) Confiança (54); (Pará) Remo (57); (Alagoas) CSA (59); (Acre (state)) Rio Branco (64); (São Paulo (state)) Ituano (65)
Group E	Group F	Group G	Group H
(Rio Grande do Norte) Globo (67); (Amapá) Santos (69); (Rio Grande do Sul) Caxias (71); (Rio de Janeiro (state)) Madureira (72); (Minas Gerais) Caldense (74); (Rio de Janeiro (state)) Boavista (76); (Goiás) Aparecidense (78); (Amazonas (Brazilian state)) Nacional (80); (Acre (state)) Atlético Acreano (81); (Piauí) Parnahyba (92)	(São Paulo (state)) São Caetano (93); (Rio Grande do Sul) Novo Hamburgo (96); (Federal District (Brazil)) Ceilândia (97); (Piauí) Altos (98); (Minas Gerais) URT (101); (Paraíba) Treze (102); (Sergipe) Itabaiana (104); (Santa Catarina (state)) Brusque (108); (Mato Grosso) Sinop (110); (Bahia) Fluminense de Feira (118)	(Roraima) São Raimundo (121); (Bahia) Vitória da Conquista (122); (Federal District (Brazil)) Brasiliense (145); (Maranhão) Cordino (157); (Rondônia) Real Ariquemes (157); (Mato Grosso) União Rondonópolis^{[1]} (157); (Pará) Independente (166); (Tocantins) Interporto (167); (Rio de Janeiro (state)) Nova Iguaçu (201); (Paraná (state)) Cianorte (205)	(São Paulo (state)) Internacional de Limeira (no rank); (Minas Gerais) Uberlândia (no rank); (Rio Grande do Sul) Aimoré (no rank); (Santa Catarina (state)) Tubarão (no rank); (Ceará) Ferroviário (no rank); (Ceará) Floresta (no rank); (Amazonas (Brazilian state)) Manaus (no rank); (Mato Grosso do Sul) Corumbaense (no rank); (Mato Grosso do Sul) Novoperário (no rank); (Espírito Santo) Atlético Itapemirim (no rank)

^{1} At the time of the draw, Dom Bosco (172).

== Format ==
In the first stage, each tie was played on a single match basis. The lower CBF ranked team hosted the match. If tied, the higher CBF ranked team would advance to second stage.

== Matches ==
All times are Brasília summer time, BRT (UTC−2)

Team 1	Score	Team 2
Caxias (Rio Grande do Sul)	0–0	(Paraná (state)) Atlético Paranaense
Tubarão (Santa Catarina (state))	2–0	(Rio Grande do Norte) América de Natal
Brusque (Santa Catarina (state))	0–1	Ceará
Real Ariquemes (Rondônia)	0–1	(Paraná (state)) Londrina
Boavista (Rio de Janeiro (state))	1–1	(Rio Grande do Sul) Internacional
Atlético Itapemirim (Espírito Santo)	0–2	(Pará) Remo
São Caetano (São Paulo (state))	1–1	(Santa Catarina (state)) Criciúma
Cianorte (Paraná (state))	2–0	(Rio Grande do Norte) ABC
Caldense (Minas Gerais)	0–1	(Rio de Janeiro (state)) Fluminense
Novoperário (Mato Grosso do Sul)	2–3	(Pernambuco) Salgueiro
Ceilândia (Federal District (Brazil))	2–3	(Santa Catarina (state)) Avaí
Interporto (Tocantins)	0–0	(Rio Grande do Sul) Juventude
Parnahyba (Piauí)	1–1	(Paraná (state)) Coritiba
Uberlândia (Minas Gerais)	2–0	(São Paulo (state)) Ituano
Sinop (Mato Grosso)	0–1	Goiás
Vitória da Conquista (Bahia)	0–0	(Minas Gerais) Boa Esporte
Nacional (Amazonas (Brazilian state))	0–0	(São Paulo (state)) Ponte Preta
Internacional de Limeira (São Paulo (state))	1–0	(Acre (state)) Rio Branco
URT (Minas Gerais)	1–1	(Paraná (state)) Paraná
Independente (Pará)	0–1	(Maranhão) Sampaio Corrêa
Madureira (Rio de Janeiro (state))	0–1	(São Paulo (state)) São Paulo
Manaus (Amazonas (Brazilian state))	2–2	(Alagoas) CSA
Novo Hamburgo (Rio Grande do Sul)	2–1	(Pará) Paysandu
União Rondonópolis (Mato Grosso)	1–3	(Alagoas) CRB
Globo (Rio Grande do Norte)	0–2	(Bahia) Vitória
Corumbaense (Mato Grosso do Sul)	1–0	(Alagoas) ASA
Altos (Piauí)	2–1	(Goiás) Atlético Goianiense
Nova Iguaçu (Rio de Janeiro (state))	1–1	(São Paulo (state)) Bragantino
Atlético Acreano (Acre (state))	1–1	(Minas Gerais) Atlético Mineiro
Floresta (Ceará)	0–2	(Paraíba) Botafogo
Treze (Paraíba)	0–2	(Santa Catarina (state)) Figueirense
Brasiliense (Federal District (Brazil))	1–1	(São Paulo (state)) Oeste
Santos (Amapá)	1–2	(Pernambuco) Sport
Ferroviário (Ceará)	2–1	(Sergipe) Confiança
Itabaiana (Sergipe)	0–1	(Santa Catarina (state)) Joinville
São Raimundo (Roraima)	0–1	(Goiás) Vila Nova
Aparecidense (Goiás)	2–1	(Rio de Janeiro (state)) Botafogo
Aimoré (Rio Grande do Sul)	1–2	(Mato Grosso) Cuiabá
Fluminense de Feira (Bahia)	2–0	(Pernambuco) Santa Cruz
Cordino (Maranhão)	1–1	(Pernambuco) Náutico

=== Match 1 ===
30 January 2018
21:30

Caxias (Rio Grande do Sul)	0–0	(Paraná (state)) Atlético Paranaense
	Report

Estádio Centenário, Caxias do Sul
Attendance: 2,563
Referee: Dyorgines José Padovani de Andrade (Espírito Santo)

=== Match 2 ===
31 January 2018
20:00

Tubarão (Santa Catarina (state))	2–0	(Rio Grande do Norte) América de Natal
Marcos Vinícius 25'; Romarinho 30'	Report

Estádio Domingos Silveira Gonzales, Tubarão
Attendance: 2,341
Referee: Daniel Nobre Bins (Rio Grande do Sul)

=== Match 3 ===
7 February 2018
21:45

Brusque (Santa Catarina (state))	0–1	Ceará
	Report	Rafael Carioca 65'

Estádio Augusto Bauer, Brusque
Attendance: 2,980
Referee: Marcelo de Lima Henrique (Rio de Janeiro)

=== Match 4 ===
31 January 2018
22:00

Real Ariquemes (Rondônia)	0–1	(Paraná (state)) Londrina
	Report	Germano 27'

Estádio Gentil Valério, Ariquemes
Attendance: 2,914
Referee: Graziani Maciel Rocha (Rio de Janeiro)

=== Match 5 ===
31 January 2018
19:30

Boavista (Rio de Janeiro (state))	1–1	(Rio Grande do Sul) Internacional
Renan Donizete 88'	Report	William Pottker 58'

Estádio Olímpico Regional Arnaldo Busatto, Cascavel
Attendance: 5,045
Referee: Leandro Bizzio Marinho (São Paulo)

=== Match 6 ===
7 February 2018
16:30

Atlético Itapemirim (Espírito Santo)	0–2	(Pará) Remo
	Report	Isac 40'; Felipe Marques 81'

Estádio José Olívio Soares, Itapemirim
Attendance: 1,146
Referee: José Mendonça da Silva Júnior (Paraná)

=== Match 7 ===
7 February 2018
19:30

São Caetano (São Paulo (state))	1–1	(Santa Catarina (state)) Criciúma
Rafael Costa 51'	Report	Mailson 10'

Estádio Anacleto Campanella, São Caetano do Sul
Attendance: 753
Referee: Leandro Vuaden (Rio Grande do Sul)

=== Match 8 ===
7 February 2018
20:30

Cianorte (Paraná (state))	2–0	(Rio Grande do Norte) ABC
Robert 66'; Rafael Xavier 90+3'	Report

Estádio Olímpico Albino Turbay, Cianorte
Attendance: 1,690
Referee: Thiago Duarte Peixoto (São Paulo)

=== Match 9 ===
31 January 2018
19:30

Caldense (Minas Gerais)	0–1	(Rio de Janeiro (state)) Fluminense
	Report	Renato Chaves 90'

Ronaldão, Poços de Caldas
Attendance: 1,935
Referee: Paulo Roberto Alves Júnior (Paraná)

=== Match 10 ===
31 January 2018
21:30

Novoperário (Mato Grosso do Sul)	2–3	(Pernambuco) Salgueiro
Jefferson Gibran 43'; Jonatan Silva 62'	Report	Willian 9'; Fabiano 32'; Escuro 87'

Morenão, Campo Grande
Attendance: 0
Referee: Alinor Silva da Paixão (Mato Grosso)

=== Match 11 ===
7 February 2018
16:00

Ceilândia (Federal District (Brazil))	2–3	(Santa Catarina (state)) Avaí
Vavá 3'; Emerson Martins 89'	Report	Rômulo 18'; Luanzinho 69', 90+4'

Estádio Maria de Lourdes Abadia, Ceilândia
Attendance: 370
Referee: Francisco Carlos do Nascimento (Alagoas)

=== Match 12 ===
31 January 2018
21:30

Interporto (Tocantins)	0–0	(Rio Grande do Sul) Juventude
	Report

Estádio General Sampaio, Porto Nacional
Attendance: 1,030
Referee: Rodrigo Batista Raposo (Distrito Federal)

=== Match 13 ===
7 February 2018
19:30

Parnahyba (Piauí)	1–1	(Paraná (state)) Coritiba
Fabinho 48'	Report	William Matheus 90+7'

Albertão, Teresina
Attendance: 746
Referee: André Luiz de Freitas Castro (Goiás)

=== Match 14 ===
31 January 2018
20:30

Uberlândia (Minas Gerais)	2–0	(São Paulo (state)) Ituano
Daniel Pereira 59'; Ricardinho 80'	Report

Estádio Parque do Sabiá, Uberlândia
Attendance: 5,825
Referee: Leonardo Garcia Cavaleiro (Rio de Janeiro)

=== Match 15 ===
7 February 2018
21:30

Sinop (Mato Grosso)	0–1	Goiás
	Report	Alex Silva 17'

Estádio Municipal Gigante do Norte, Sinop
Attendance: 2,383
Referee: Felipe Gomes da Silva (Paraná)

=== Match 16 ===
30 January 2018
20:00

Vitória da Conquista (Bahia)	0–0	(Minas Gerais) Boa Esporte
	Report

Estádio Lomanto Júnior, Vitória da Conquista
Attendance: 1,399
Referee: Antônio Dib Moraes de Sousa (Piauí)

=== Match 17 ===
6 February 2018
19:15

Nacional (Amazonas (Brazilian state))	0–0	(São Paulo (state)) Ponte Preta
	Report

Arena da Amazônia, Manaus
Attendance: 2,146
Referee: Sávio Pereira Sampaio (Distrito Federal)

=== Match 18 ===
6 February 2018
20:30

Internacional de Limeira (São Paulo (state))	1–0	(Acre (state)) Rio Branco
Tom 40'	Report

Estádio Major José Levy Sobrinho, Limeira
Attendance: 3,664
Referee: Alexandre Vargas Tavares de Jesus (Rio de Janeiro)

=== Match 19 ===
1 February 2018
19:15

URT (Minas Gerais)	1–1	(Paraná (state)) Paraná
Ewerton Maradona 5'	Report	Alemão 90'

Estádio Zama Maciel, Patos de Minas
Attendance: 2,560
Referee: Eduardo Tomaz de Aquino Valadão (Goiás)

=== Match 20 ===
31 January 2018
21:30

Independente (Pará)	0–1	(Maranhão) Sampaio Corrêa
	Report	Marlon 45+1'

Estádio Municipal Antônio Dias, Tucuruí
Attendance: 2,543
Referee: Marcos Mateus Pereira (Mato Grosso do Sul)

=== Match 21 ===
31 January 2018
21:45

Madureira (Rio de Janeiro (state))	0–1	(São Paulo (state)) São Paulo
	Report	Brenner 17'

Estádio do Café, Londrina
Attendance: 4,455
Referee: Rafael Traci (Paraná)

=== Match 22 ===
7 February 2018
22:30

Manaus (Amazonas (Brazilian state))	2–2	(Alagoas) CSA
Deurick 35'; Hamilton 65'	Report	Giva 44'; Leandro Souza 86'

Arena da Amazônia, Manaus
Attendance: 3,057
Referee: Vanderlei Soares de Macêdo (Distrito Federal)

=== Match 23 ===
1 February 2018
21:30

Novo Hamburgo (Rio Grande do Sul)	2–1	(Pará) Paysandu
Talis 51'; Juninho Silva 58'	Report	Mike 70'

Estádio do Vale, Novo Hamburgo
Attendance: 865
Referee: Alisson Sidnei Furtado (Tocantins)

=== Match 24 ===
7 February 2018
21:30

União Rondonópolis (Mato Grosso)	1–3	(Alagoas) CRB
Allyson 67'	Report	Neto Baiano 26'; Willians Santana 58'; Serginho 63'

Arena Pantanal, Cuiabá
Attendance: 296
Referee: Igor Junio Benevenuto (Minas Gerais)

=== Match 25 ===
7 February 2018
19:30

Globo (Rio Grande do Norte)	0–2	(Bahia) Vitória
	Report	Denílson 7', 44'

Estádio Manoel Dantas Barretto, Ceará-Mirim
Attendance: 405
Referee: Péricles Bassols Pegado Cortez (Pernambuco)

=== Match 26 ===
7 February 2018
21:30

Corumbaense (Mato Grosso do Sul)	1–0	(Alagoas) ASA
Elivélton 90'	Report

Estádio Arthur Marinho, Corumbá
Attendance: 3,531
Referee: Wanderson Alves de Sousa (Minas Gerais)

=== Match 27 ===
7 February 2018
17:00

Altos (Piauí)	2–1	(Goiás) Atlético Goianiense
Manoel 34' (pen.); Joélson 73'	Report	Hugo Gomes 59'

Estádio Felipe Raulino, Altos
Attendance: 1,277
Referee: Mayron Frederico dos Reis Novais (Maranhão)

=== Match 28 ===
31 January 2018
16:00

Nova Iguaçu (Rio de Janeiro (state))	1–1	(São Paulo (state)) Bragantino
Adriano 45+4'	Report	Juliano 86'

Estádio Jânio Moraes, Nova Iguaçu
Attendance: 999
Referee: Léo Simão Holanda (Ceará)

=== Match 29 ===
7 February 2018
21:45

Atlético Acreano (Acre (state))	1–1	(Minas Gerais) Atlético Mineiro
João Marcus 7'	Report	Erik Lima 44'

Arena da Floresta, Rio Branco
Attendance: 3,649
Referee: João Batista de Arruda (Rio de Janeiro)

=== Match 30 ===
31 January 2018
21:30

Floresta (Ceará)	0–2	(Paraíba) Botafogo
	Report	Carlos Renato 6'; Allan Dias 66'

Estádio Presidente Vargas, Fortaleza
Attendance: 339
Referee: Diego Pombo Lopez (Bahia)

=== Match 31 ===
31 January 2018
21:30

Treze (Paraíba)	0–2	(Santa Catarina (state)) Figueirense
	Report	André Luis 21'; João Lucas 67'

Amigão, Campina Grande
Attendance: 5,911
Referee: Vinicius Gonçalves Dias Araújo (São Paulo)

=== Match 32 ===
6 February 2018
20:15

Brasiliense (Federal District (Brazil))	1–1	(São Paulo (state)) Oeste
Nunes 41'	Report	Raphael Luz 64'

Estádio Nacional Mané Garrincha, Brasília
Attendance: 912
Referee: Bruno Arleu de Araújo (Rio de Janeiro)

=== Match 33 ===
7 February 2018
19:30

Santos (Amapá)	1–2	(Pernambuco) Sport
Bruninho 85'	Report	Leandro Pereira 55', 87'

Zerão, Macapá
Attendance: 1,774
Referee: Joelson Nazareno Ferreira Cardoso (Pará)

=== Match 34 ===
7 February 2018
21:30

Ferroviário (Ceará)	2–1	(Sergipe) Confiança
Túlio 42'; Rodrigo Rodrigues 78'	Report	Vítor 55'

Estádio Presidente Vargas, Fortaleza
Attendance: 1,273
Referee: Salim Fende Chavez (São Paulo)

=== Match 35 ===
31 January 2018
21:30

Itabaiana (Sergipe)	0–1	(Santa Catarina (state)) Joinville
	Report	Elias 79'

Estádio Etelvino Mendonça, Itabaiana
Attendance: 1,683
Referee: Emerson de Almeida Ferreira (Minas Gerais)

=== Match 36 ===
7 February 2018
22:30

São Raimundo (Roraima)	0–1	(Goiás) Vila Nova
	Report	Diego Giaretta 55'

Estádio Raimundo Ribeiro de Souza, Boa Vista
Attendance: 539
Referee: Gilberto Rodrigues Castro Júnior (Pernambuco)

=== Match 37 ===
6 February 2018
21:30

Aparecidense (Goiás)	2–1	(Rio de Janeiro (state)) Botafogo
Nonato 48'; Gustavo Ramos 84'	Report	Rodrigo Pimpão 6'

Estádio Annibal Batista de Toledo, Aparecida de Goiânia
Attendance: 1,718
Referee: Flávio Rodrigues de Souza (São Paulo)

=== Match 38 ===
31 January 2018
20:00

Aimoré (Rio Grande do Sul)	1–2	(Mato Grosso) Cuiabá
Brandão 23'	Report	Weverton 74'; Weriton 90+5'

Estádio João Corrêa da Silveira, São Leopoldo
Attendance: 1,669
Referee: Rodrigo D'Alonso Ferreira (Santa Catarina)

=== Match 39 ===
31 January 2018
22:30

Fluminense de Feira (Bahia)	2–0	(Pernambuco) Santa Cruz
Maranhão 41'; Levi 84'	Report

Estádio Joia da Princesa, Feira de Santana
Attendance: 3,480
Referee: Jean Pierre Gonçalves Lima (Rio Grande do Sul)

=== Match 40 ===
31 January 2018
21:30

Cordino (Maranhão)	1–1	(Pernambuco) Náutico
Ulisses 29' (pen.)	Report	Camutanga 81'

Castelão, São Luís
Attendance: 272
Referee: Andrey da Silva e Silva (Pará)
