= Temesvar =

Temesvar may refer to places:

- Temešvár, a municipality and village in the Czech Republic
- Timișoara (Hungarian: Temesvár), a city in Romania
- Tanasvan, also known as Temesvar, a village in Iran

== See also ==
- Siege of Temesvár (disambiguation)
