= Giuliani =

Giuliani is an Italian surname; either derived as a patronymic or plural form of Giuliano, or as a locative name from a place so named, such as Giuliano di Roma. Guiliani is a metathesized variant. Notable people with the name include:

- Beatrice Giuliani (born 2002), Italian rower
- Carlo Giuliani (1978–2001), Italian anti-globalization protester, died during the demonstrations against the 2001 G8
- Carlo Giuliani (bishop) (died 1663), bishop of Ston
- Caroline Giuliani (born 1989), American filmmaker, political activist, and writer
- Donato Giuliani (1946–2025), Italian racing cyclist
- François Giuliani (1938–2009), Algerian journalist and publicist
- Gilda Giuliani (born 1954), Italian singer
- Laura Giuliani (born 1993), Italian football goalkeeper
- Luca Giuliani (born 1950), Italian professor at the Humboldt University, specialising in Greek and Roman archaeology
- Lui Giuliani, Australian businessman
- Marie-Christine Giuliani-Sterrer (born 1965), Austrian politician
- Mauro Giuliani (1781–1829), Italian guitarist and composer
- Maximillian Giuliani (born 2003), Australian swimmer
- Reginaldo Giuliani (1887–1936), better known as Father Giuliani, Dominican friar, soldier and Italian writer
- Rudy Giuliani (born 1944), former mayor of New York City and former candidate for United States president in 2008
  - Regina Peruggi Giuliani, his first wife, American educator
  - Donna Hanover Giuliani, his second wife
  - Judith Giuliani, his third wife
  - Andrew Giuliani, his son; American Special Assistant to the President Trump.
  - Caroline Giuliani, his daughter; American filmmaker, political activist, and writer
- Simone Giuliani (born 1973), Italian musician, composer, arranger and record producer
- Stefano Giuliani (born 1958), former Italian professional cyclist
- Tony Giuliani (1912–2004), catcher in Major League Baseball from 1936 to 1943
- Veronica Giuliani (1660–1727), mystic and saint

== See also ==
- Giuliani (turkey), the tame wild turkey that lives in Riverside Park, Manhattan, New York City, named for the former mayor
- Giuliani Partners, a company founded by Rudolph Giuliani and its former subsidiary Giuliani Capital Advisors
