= Valeh =

Valeh (Persian: وله or واله) may refer to:

- Valeh, Alborz (وله - Valeh)
- Valeh, Mazandaran (واله - Vāleh)

== See also ==
- Vale (disambiguation)
