= Ziliani =

Ziliani is a surname. Notable persons with that surname include:

- Paolo Ziliani (born 1992), retired Italian football defender
- Franco Ziliani (1956-2021), Italian journalist, blogger and wine critic

== See also ==
- Giuliani
