= Garm Khani =

Garm Khani or Garamkhani (Persian: گرم خاني) may refer to:

- Garamkhani, Gilan
- Garm Khani, Lorestan
- Garm Khani, Mazandaran
