= Vasyeh Kash =

Vasyeh Kash وسيه كش
- Village
- Location within Iran
- Coordinates: 35°59′23″N 52°46′53″E
- Country: Iran
- Province: Mazandaran
- County: Savadkuh
- Bakhsh: Central
- Rural District: Valupey

Population (2011)
  - Total: 15
- Time zone: UTC+3:30 (IRST)

Vasyeh Kash (Persian: وسيه كش, also Romanized as Vesyeh Kash, Vesyeh Kesh, and Vasīeh Kash; also known as Vastikah, Vazīr Kash, and Vesī Kesh) is a village in Valupey Rural District, in the Central District of Savadkuh County, Mazandaran Province, Iran.

At the time of the 2006 National Census, the village's population was 76 in 21 households. The following census in 2011 counted 15 people in 8 households. In the 2016 census the village had less than 4 households and its population was not recorded.
