= Laleh Band =

Village in Mazandaran province, Iran

Laleh Band Persian: لَلِ بند
- Village
- Location within Iran
- Coordinates: 36°05′59″N 52°59′25″E
- Country: Iran
- Province: Mazandaran
- County: Savadkuh
- District: Central
- Rural District: Valupey

Population (2016)
  - Total: 436
- Time zone: UTC+3:30 (IRST)

Laleh Band (Persian: لَلِ بند) is a village in, and the capital of, Valupey Rural District in the Central District of Savadkuh County, Mazandaran province, Iran.

== Demographics ==
=== Population ===
At the time of the 2006 National Census, the village's population was 287 in 87 households. The following census in 2011 counted 373 people in 115 households. The 2016 census measured the population of the village as 436 people in 152 households.
