= Razmeghan =

Village in North Khorasan province, Iran

Razmeghan Persian: رزمغان
- Village
- Location within Iran
- Coordinates: 37°18′51″N 57°54′33″E
- Country: Iran
- Province: North Khorasan
- County: Shirvan
- District: Central
- Rural District: Golian

Population (2016)
  - Total: 856
- Time zone: UTC+3:30 (IRST)

Razmeghan (Persian: رزمغان) (Note: Also romanized as Razmeghān; also known as Rakzaman, Rāzmakān, Razmaqān, Razmegān, and Razmqān) is a village in Golian Rural District of the Central District in Shirvan County, North Khorasan province, Iran.

== Demographics ==
=== Population ===
At the time of the 2006 National Census, the village's population was 949 in 237 households. The following census in 2011 counted 946 people in 271 households. The 2016 census measured the population of the village as 856 people in 272 households, the most populous in its rural district.
