= Hesar-e Pahlavanlu =

Village in North Khorasan province, Iran

Hesar-e Pahlavanlu Persian: حصارپهلوانلو
- Village
- Location within Iran
- Coordinates: 37°13′53″N 57°53′34″E
- Country: Iran
- Province: North Khorasan
- County: Shirvan
- District: Central
- Rural District: Golian

Population (2016)
  - Total: 307
- Time zone: UTC+3:30 (IRST)

Hesar-e Pahlavanlu (Persian: حصارپهلوانلو) (Note: Also romanized as Ḩeşār-e Pahlavānlū and Ḩeşār-e Pahlevānlū; also known as Ḩeşār-e Gelīān and Ḩeşār-e Golīān (حصارگليان)) is a village in Golian Rural District of the Central District in Shirvan County, North Khorasan province, Iran.

== Demographics ==
=== Population ===
At the time of the 2006 National Census, the village's population was 663 in 176 households. The following census in 2011 counted 431 people in 131 households. The 2016 census measured the population of the village as 307 people in 113 households.
