= Evat =

Evat اوات
- Village
- Location within Iran
- Coordinates: 36°02′46″N 52°57′56″E
- Country: Iran
- Province: Mazandaran
- County: Savadkuh
- Bakhsh: Central
- Rural District: Valupey

Population (2016)
  - Total: 93
- Time zone: UTC+3:30 (IRST)

Evat (Persian: اوات, also Romanized as Evāt; also known as Avbāt, Owbār, and Ūbāt) is a village in Valupey Rural District, in the Central District of Savadkuh County, Mazandaran Province, Iran.

At the time of the 2006 National Census, the village's population was 105 in 36 households. The following census in 2011 counted 84 people in 30 households. The 2016 census measured the population of the village as 93 people in 33 households.
