= Molla Baqer =

Village in North Khorasan province, Iran

Molla Baqer Persian: ملاباقر
- Village
- Location within Iran
- Coordinates: 37°16′01″N 57°55′23″E
- Country: Iran
- Province: North Khorasan
- County: Shirvan
- District: Central
- Rural District: Golian

Population (2016)
  - Total: 520
- Time zone: UTC+3:30 (IRST)

Molla Baqer (Persian: ملاباقر) (Note: Also romanized as Mollā Bāqer; also known as Mollā Bāger) is a village in Golian Rural District of the Central District in Shirvan County, North Khorasan province, Iran.

== Demographics ==
=== Population ===
At the time of the 2006 National Census, the village's population was 704 in 187 households. The following census in 2011 counted 589 people in 168 households. The 2016 census measured the population of the village as 520 people in 176 households.
