= Memshi =

Memshi ممشی
- Village
- Location within Iran
- Coordinates: 36°06′12″N 52°55′10″E
- Country: Iran
- Province: Mazandaran
- County: Savadkuh
- Bakhsh: Central
- Rural District: Valupey

Population (2016)
  - Total: 185
- Time zone: UTC+3:30 (IRST)

Memshi (Persian: ممشی, also Romanized as Memshī) is a village in Valupey Rural District, in the Central District of Savadkuh County, Mazandaran Province, Iran.

At the time of the 2006 National Census, the village's population was 86 in 23 households. The following census in 2011 counted 261 people in 79 households. The 2016 census measured the population of the village as 185 people in 69 households.
