= Arat Bon =

Village in Mazandaran province, Iran

Arat Bon Persian: ارات بن
- Village
- Location within Iran
- Coordinates: 36°02′53″N 52°55′56″E
- Country: Iran
- Province: Mazandaran
- County: Savadkuh
- District: Central
- Rural District: Valupey

Population (2016)
  - Total: 279
- Time zone: UTC+3:30 (IRST)

Arat Bon (Persian: ارات بن) (Note: Also romanized as Arāt Bon; also known as Arātahban and Kamand) is a village in Valupey Rural District of the Central District in Savadkuh County, Mazandaran province, Iran.

== Demographics ==
=== Population ===
At the time of the 2006 National Census, the village's population was 253 in 84 households. The following census in 2011 counted 284 people in 106 households. The 2016 census measured the population of the village as 279 people in 108 households.
