= Larazneh =

Larazneh لرزنه
- Village
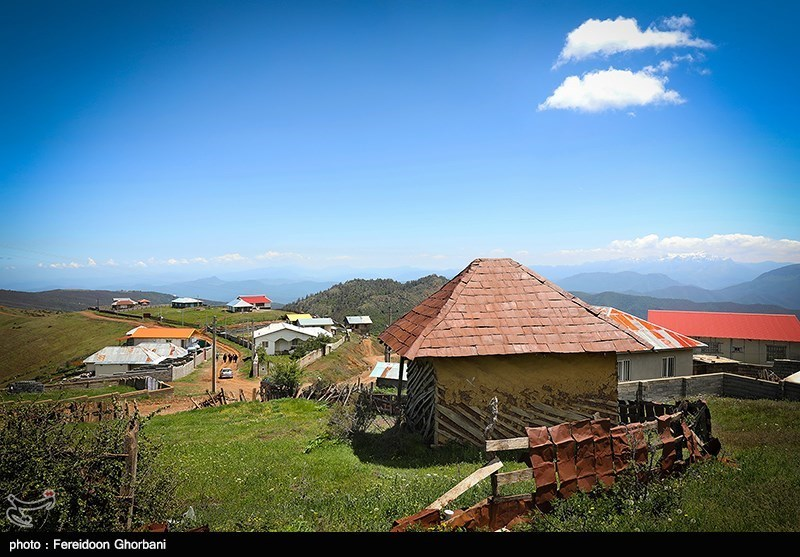
- The village of Lazneh

- Location within Iran
- Coordinates: 36°05′03″N 52°49′16″E
- Country: Iran
- Province: Mazandaran
- County: Savadkuh
- Bakhsh: Central
- Rural District: Valupey

Population (2006)
  - Total: 101
- Time zone: UTC+3:30 (IRST)

Larazneh (Persian: لرزنه) is a village in Valupey Rural District, in the Central District of Savadkuh County, Mazandaran Province, Iran. At the 2006 census, its population was 101, in 28 families. In 2016, there no households residing in the village.
