= Cherat, Iran =

Cherat چرات
- Village
- Location within Iran
- Coordinates: 35°58′39″N 52°40′57″E
- Country: Iran
- Province: Mazandaran
- County: Savadkuh
- Bakhsh: Central
- Rural District: Valupey

Population (2016)
  - Total: 58
- Time zone: UTC+3:30 (IRST)

Cherat (Persian: چرات, also Romanized as Cherāt) is a village in Valupey Rural District, in the Central District of Savadkuh County, Mazandaran Province, Iran.

At the time of the 2006 National Census, the village's population was 14 in 4 households. The following census in 2011 counted 150 people in 61 households. The 2016 census measured the population of the village as 58 people in 21 households.
