= Valupey Rural District =

Rural district in Mazandaran province, Iran

Valupey Rural District Persian: دهستان ولوپي
- Rural District
- Location within Iran
- Coordinates: 36°01′N 52°50′E
- Country: Iran
- Province: Mazandaran
- County: Savadkuh
- District: Central
- Established: 1987
- Capital: Laleh Band

Population (2016)
  - Total: 5,521
- Time zone: UTC+3:30 (IRST)

Valupey Rural District (Persian: دهستان ولوپي) is in the Central District of Savadkuh County, Mazandaran province, Iran. Its capital is the village of Laleh Band.

== Demographics ==
=== Population ===
At the time of the 2006 National Census, the rural district's population was 3,538 in 1,097 households. There were 4,535 inhabitants in 1,646 households at the following census of 2011. The 2016 census measured the population of the rural district as 5,521 in 1,984 households. The most populous of its 60 villages was Karmozd, with 1,011 people.

=== Other villages in the rural district ===
- Anand
- Arat Bon
- Baraniganun
- Cherat
- Deraseleh
- Esparz
- Evat
- Garm Khani
- Garrudbar
- Gelian
- Kakerun
- Kalarijan
- Kari Kola
- Lakowm
- Larazneh
- Lind
- Memshi
- Mumej Kheyl
- Paland
- Parsi
- Pishin Valeh
- Savad Rudbar
- Serin
- Shesh Rudbar
- Shir Darreh
- Shir Kola
- Tilam
- Valeh
- Vasyeh Kash
- Zangian
