= Paland =

Village in Mazandaran province, Iran

Paland Persian: پالند
- Village
- Location within Iran
- Coordinates: 36°00′51″N 52°54′45″E
- Country: Iran
- Province: Mazandaran
- County: Savadkuh
- District: Central
- Rural District: Valupey

Population (2016)
  - Total: 260
- Time zone: UTC+3:30 (IRST)

Paland (Persian: پالند) (Note: Also romanized as Pāland and Palend) is a village in Valupey Rural District of the Central District in Savadkuh County, Mazandaran province, Iran.

== Demographics ==
=== Population ===
At the time of the 2006 National Census, the village's population was 90 in 33 households. The following census in 2011 counted 114 people in 40 households. The 2016 census measured the population of the village as 260 people in 77 households.
