= Guiliano (name) =

Guiliano is an Italian origin name which is used as a surname. People with the name include:

== Surname ==
- Edward Guiliano, American author and academic
- Mireille Guiliano (born 1946), French-American author

=== Fictional characters ===
Salvatore Guiliano, main character in Mario Puzo's novel The Sicilian

== See also ==
- Giuliano
