= Pir Shahid =

Village in North Khorasan province, Iran

Pir Shahid Persian: پيرشهيد
- Village
- Location within Iran
- Coordinates: 37°21′38″N 57°56′30″E
- Country: Iran
- Province: North Khorasan
- County: Shirvan
- District: Central
- Rural District: Golian

Population (2016)
  - Total: 721
- Time zone: UTC+3:30 (IRST)

Pir Shahid (Persian: پيرشهيد) (Note: Also romanized as Pīr Shahīd) is a village in Golian Rural District of the Central District in Shirvan County, North Khorasan province, Iran.

== Demographics ==
=== Population ===
At the time of the 2006 National Census, the village's population was 697 in 174 households. The following census in 2011 counted 829 people in 239 households. The 2016 census measured the population of the village as 721 people in 225 households.
