= Garrudbar =

Garrudbar گررودبار
- Village
- Location within Iran
- Coordinates: 36°05′00″N 52°59′00″E
- Country: Iran
- Province: Mazandaran
- County: Savadkuh
- Bakhsh: Central
- Rural District: Valupey

Population (2016)
  - Total: 14
- Time zone: UTC+3:30 (IRST)

Garrudbar (Persian: گررودبار, also Romanized as Garrūdbār) is a village in Valupey Rural District, in the Central District of Savadkuh County, Mazandaran Province, Iran.

At the time of the 2006 National Census, the village's population was 18 in 6 households. The following census in 2011 counted 16 people in 6 households. The 2016 census measured the population of the village as 14 people in 7 households.
