= Lakowm =

Lakowm لاكوم
- Village
- Location within Iran
- Coordinates: 36°05′07″N 52°48′13″E
- Country: Iran
- Province: Mazandaran
- County: Savadkuh
- Bakhsh: Central
- Rural District: Valupey

Population (2016)
  - Total: 36
- Time zone: UTC+3:30 (IRST)

Lakowm (Persian: لاكوم, also Romanized as Lākowm; also known as Lakom) is a village in Valupey Rural District, in the Central District of Savadkuh County, Mazandaran Province, Iran.

At the time of the 2006 National Census, the village's population was 80 in 20 households. The following census in 2011 counted 16 people in 5 households. The 2016 census measured the population of the village as 36 people in 16 households.
