= Serin, Iran =

Serin سرين
- Village
- Location within Iran
- Coordinates: 36°04′59″N 52°50′30″E
- Country: Iran
- Province: Mazandaran
- County: Savadkuh
- Bakhsh: Central
- Rural District: Valupey

Population (2016)
  - Total: 153
- Time zone: UTC+3:30 (IRST)

Sereen (Persian: سرين, also Romanized as sereen) is a village in Valupey Rural District, in the Central District of Savadkuh County, Mazandaran Province, Iran.

At the time of the 2006 National Census, the village's population was 126 in 32 households. The following census in 2011 counted 101 people in 36 households. The 2016 census measured the population of the village as 153 people in 58 households.
