= Deraseleh =

Village in Mazandaran province, Iran

Deraseleh Persian: دراسله
- Village
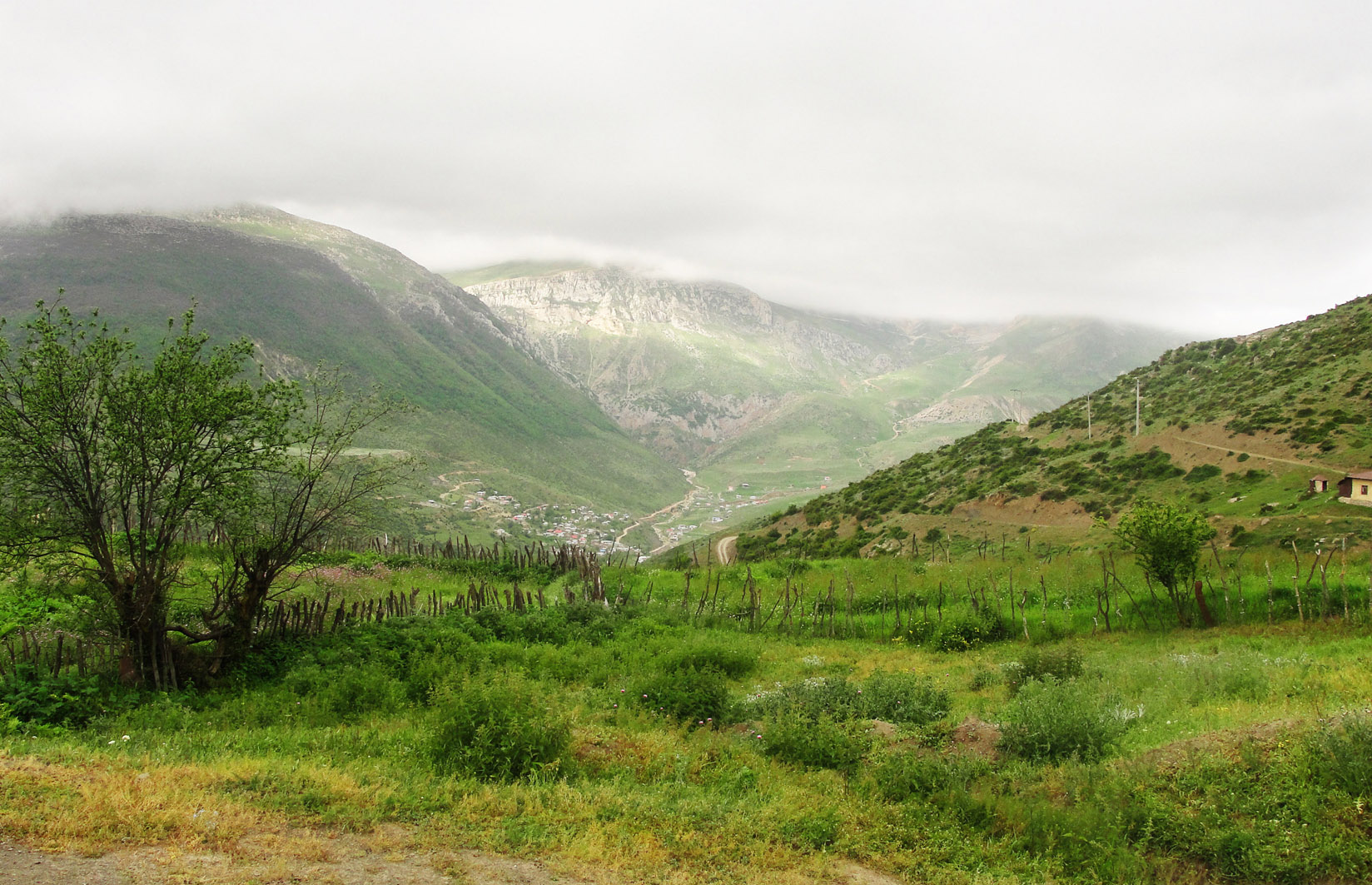
- The village of Deraseleh

- Location within Iran
- Coordinates: 35°58′12″N 52°48′37″E
- Country: Iran
- Province: Mazandaran
- County: Savadkuh
- District: Central
- Rural District: Valupey

Population (2016)
  - Total: 418
- Time zone: UTC+3:30 (IRST)

Deraseleh (Persian: دراسله) (Note: Also romanized as Derāseleh) is a village in Valupey Rural District of the Central District in Savadkuh County, Mazandaran province, Iran.

== Demographics ==
=== Population ===
At the time of the 2006 National Census, the village's population was 89 in 26 households. The following census in 2011 counted 86 people in 43 households. The 2016 census measured the population of the village as 418 people in 138 households.
