= Kalarijan =

Village in Mazandaran province, Iran

Kalarijan Persian: كلاريجان
- Village
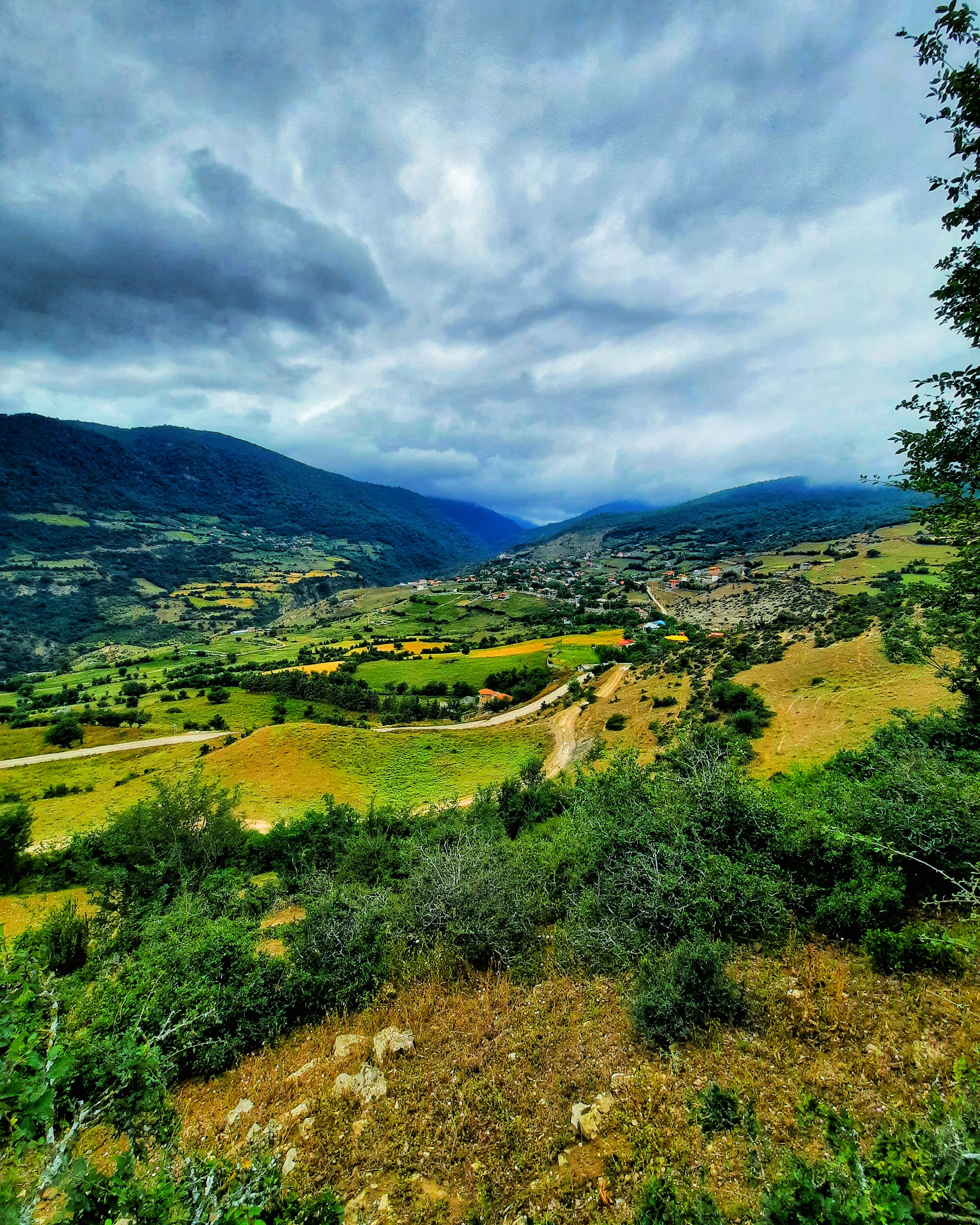
- The village of Kalarijan

- Location within Iran
- Coordinates: 36°07′50″N 52°59′12″E
- Country: Iran
- Province: Mazandaran
- County: Savadkuh
- District: Central
- Rural District: Valupey

Population (2016)
  - Total: 257
- Time zone: UTC+3:30 (IRST)

Kalarijan (Persian: كلاريجان) (Note: Also romanized as Kalārījān) is a village in Valupey Rural District of the Central District in Savadkuh County, Mazandaran province, Iran.

== Demographics ==
=== Population ===
At the time of the 2006 National Census, the village's population was 157 in 52 households. The following census in 2011 counted 197 people in 72 households. The 2016 census measured the population of the village as 257 people in 100 households.

== See also ==
Media related to Kalarijan at Wikimedia Commons
