= Shir Kola, Savadkuh =

Shir Kola شيركلا
- Village
- Location within Iran
- Coordinates: 36°05′29″N 52°58′55″E
- Country: Iran
- Province: Mazandaran
- County: Savadkuh
- Bakhsh: Central
- Rural District: Valupey

Population (2016)
  - Total: 185
- Time zone: UTC+3:30 (IRST)

Shir Kola (Persian: شيركلا, also Romanized as Shīr Kolā) is a village in Valupey Rural District, in the Central District of Savadkuh County, Mazandaran Province, Iran.

At the time of the 2006 National Census, the village's population was 129 people. The following census in 2011 counted 260 people in 78 households. The 2016 census measured the population of the village as 185 people in 63 households.
