= Anand, Iran =

Anand انند
- Village
- Location within Iran
- Coordinates: 35°59′39″N 52°43′20″E
- Country: Iran
- Province: Mazandaran
- County: Savadkuh
- Bakhsh: Central
- Rural District: Valupey

Population (2016)
  - Total: 101
- Time zone: UTC+3:30 (IRST)

Anand (Persian: انند; also known as Anāneh) is a village in Valupey Rural District, in the Central District of Savadkuh County, Mazandaran Province, Iran.

At the time of the 2006 National Census, the village's population was 73 in 21 households. The following census in 2011 counted 165 people in 76 households. The 2016 census measured the population of the village as 101 people in 33 households.
