= Baraniganun =

Baraniganun بارنیگنون
- Village
- Location within Iran
- Coordinates: 36°00′20″N 52°46′27″E
- Country: Iran
- Province: Mazandaran
- County: Savadkuh
- Bakhsh: Central
- Rural District: Valupey

Population (2016)
  - Total: 0
- Time zone: UTC+3:30 (IRST)

Baraniganun (Persian: بارنیگنون, also Romanized as Bāranīganūn; also known as Bāranganān and Barenganān) is a village in Valupey Rural District, in the Central District of Savadkuh County, Mazandaran Province, Iran.

At the time of the 2006 National Census, the village's population was 8 in 4 households. The following census in 2011 counted 15 people in 8 households. The 2016 census measured the population as 0.
