= Kari Kola, Savadkuh =

Keri Kola كريكلا (کبریا کلا)
- Village
- Location within Iran
- Coordinates: 36°08′35″N 53°01′00″E
- Country: Iran
- Province: Mazandaran
- County: Savadkuh
- Bakhsh: Central
- Rural District: Valupey

Population (2016)
  - Total: 124
- Time zone: UTC+3:30 (IRST)

Kari Kola (Persian: كريكلا, also Romanized as Karī Kolā) is a village in Valupey Rural District, in the Central District of Savadkuh County, Mazandaran Province, Iran.

At the time of the 2006 National Census, the village's population was 83 in 23 households. The following census in 2011 counted 72 people in 19 households. The 2016 census measured the population of the village as 124 people in 42 households. شورای دزد روستا رضاعلی رضایی و قربان خلیل نژاد
