= Juliano =

Juliano may refer to

- Juliano (given name)
- Juliano (surname)

== See also ==
- Henrique & Juliano
