= Lind, Iran =

Village in Mazandaran province, Iran

Lind Persian: ليند
- Village
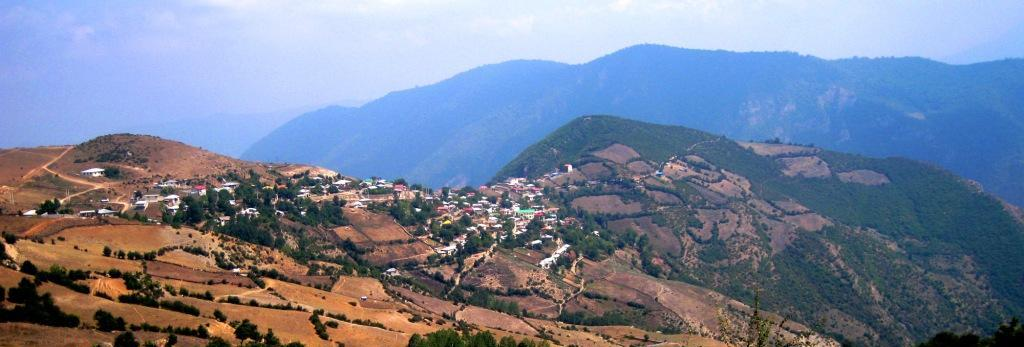
- The village of Lind

- Location within Iran
- Coordinates: 36°04′39″N 52°52′33″E
- Country: Iran
- Province: Mazandaran
- County: Savadkuh
- District: Central
- Rural District: Valupey

Population (2016)
  - Total: 534
- Time zone: UTC+3:30 (IRST)

Lind (Persian: ليند) (Note: Also romanized as Līnd; also known as Lin) is a village in Valupey Rural District of the Central District in Savadkuh County, Mazandaran province, Iran.

== Demographics ==
=== Population ===
At the time of the 2006 National Census, the village's population was 249 in 70 households. The following census in 2011 counted 371 people in 149 households. The 2016 census measured the population of the village as 534 people in 199 households.
