= Pishin Valeh =

Pishin Valeh پيشين واله
- Village
- Location within Iran
- Coordinates: 35°59′16″N 52°49′09″E
- Country: Iran
- Province: Mazandaran
- County: Savadkuh
- Bakhsh: Central
- Rural District: Valupey

Population (2016)
  - Total: 79
- Time zone: UTC+3:30 (IRST)

Pishin Valeh (Persian: پيشين واله, also Romanized as Pīshīn Vāleh) is a village in Valupey Rural District, in the Central District of Savadkuh County, Mazandaran Province, Iran.

At the time of the 2006 National Census, the village's population was 69 in 21 households. The following census in 2011 counted 37 people in 23 households. The 2016 census measured the population of the village as 79 people in 31 households.
