= Tilam =

Village in Mazandaran province, Iran

Tilam Persian: تيلم
- Village
- Location within Iran
- Coordinates: 36°01′30″N 52°56′44″E
- Country: Iran
- Province: Mazandaran
- County: Savadkuh
- District: Central
- Rural District: Valupey

Population (2016)
  - Total: 318
- Time zone: UTC+3:30 (IRST)

Tilam (Persian: تيلم) (Note: Also romanized as Tīlam and Tīlem) is a village in Valupey Rural District of the Central District in Savadkuh County, Mazandaran province, Iran.

== Demographics ==
=== Population ===
At the time of the 2006 National Census, the village's population was 91 in 46 households. The following census in 2011 counted 269 people in 96 households. The 2016 census measured the population of the village as 318 people in 116 households.
