= Shir Darreh, Mazandaran =

Shir Darreh شيردره
- Village
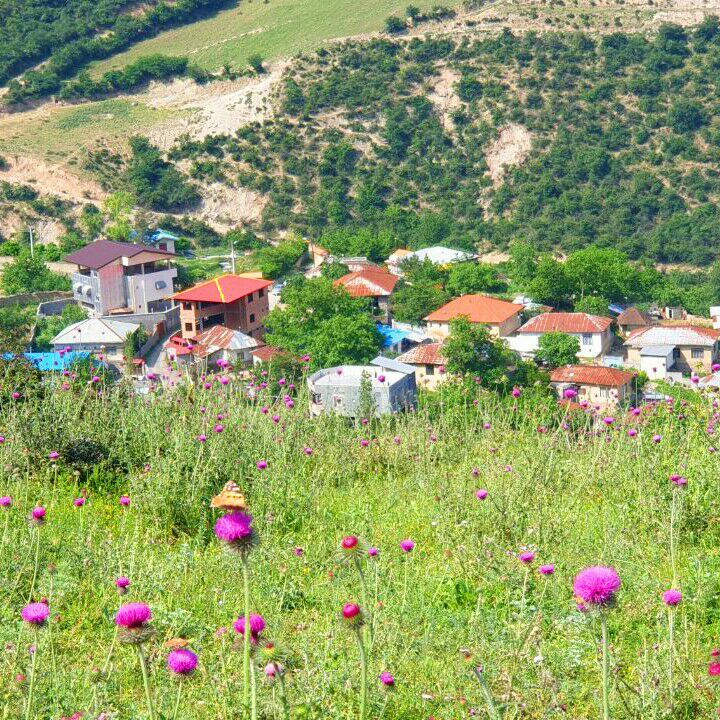

- Location within Iran
- Coordinates: 36°07′08″N 53°00′52″E
- Country: Iran
- Province: Mazandaran
- County: Savadkuh
- Bakhsh: Central
- Rural District: Valupey

Population (2016)
  - Total: 55
- Time zone: UTC+3:30 (IRST)

Shir Darreh (Persian: شيردره, also Romanized as Shīr Darreh) is a village in Valupey Rural District, in the Central District of Savadkuh County, Mazandaran Province, Iran.

At the 2006 census, its population was 59, in 24 families. At the 2016 census, its population was 55, in 25 families.
