= Parsi, Iran =

Parsi پارسی
- Village
- Location within Iran
- Coordinates: 36°07′20″N 52°58′40″E
- Country: Iran
- Province: Mazandaran
- County: Savadkuh
- Bakhsh: Central
- Rural District: Valupey

Population (2006)
  - Total: 69
- Time zone: UTC+3:30 (IRST)

Parsi (Persian: پارسی, also Romanized as Pārsī) is a village in Valupey Rural District, in the Central District of Savadkuh County, Mazandaran Province, Iran.

At the time of the 2006 National Census, the village's population was 82 in 25 households. The following census in 2011 counted 73 people in 31 households. The 2016 census measured the population of the village as 69 people in 26 households.
