= Karmozd =

Village in Mazandaran province, Iran

Karmozd Persian: كارمزد
- Village
- Location within Iran
- Coordinates: 36°05′42″N 52°53′19″E
- Country: Iran
- Province: Mazandaran
- County: Savadkuh
- District: Central
- Rural District: Valupey

Population (2016)
  - Total: 1,011
- Time zone: UTC+3:30 (IRST)

Karmozd (Persian: كارمزد) (Note: Also romanized as Kārmozd) is a village in Valupey Rural District of the Central District in Savadkuh County, Mazandaran province, Iran. According to historians, the name of this village was adapted from Hormoz, the king of Iran; over time, it evolved to its present name.

== Demographics ==
=== Population ===
At the time of the 2006 National Census, the village's population was 352 in 86 households. The following census in 2011 counted 624 people in 172 households. The 2016 census measured the population of the village as 1,011 people in 334 households, the most populous in its rural district.
