= Shesh Rudbar =

Shesh Rudbar شش رودبار
- Village
- Location within Iran
- Coordinates: 35°59′51″N 52°52′22″E
- Country: Iran
- Province: Mazandaran
- County: Savadkuh
- Bakhsh: Central
- Rural District: Valupey

Population (2016)
  - Total: 85
- Time zone: UTC+3:30 (IRST)

Shesh Rudbar (Persian: شش رودبار, also Romanized as Shesh Rūdbār) is a village in Valupey Rural District, in the Central District of Savadkuh County, Mazandaran Province, Iran.

At the time of the 2006 National Census, the village's population was 53 in 28 households. The following census in 2011 counted 63 people in 28 households. The 2016 census measured the population of the village as 85 people in 35 households.
