= Mumej Kheyl =

Village in Mazandaran province, Iran

Mumej Kheyl Persian: مومج خيل
- Village
- Location within Iran
- Coordinates: 36°05′09″N 52°58′48″E
- Country: Iran
- Province: Mazandaran
- County: Savadkuh
- District: Central
- Rural District: Valupey

Population (2016)
  - Total: 276
- Time zone: UTC+3:30 (IRST)

Mumej Kheyl (Persian: مومج خيل) (Note: Also romanized as Mowmj-e Kheyl and Mūmej Kheyl; also known as Mamaj Kheyl, Momjeh Kheyl, Mumejeheil, and Mumejekhel) is a village in Valupey Rural District of the Central District in Savadkuh County, Mazandaran province, Iran.

== Demographics ==
=== Population ===
At the time of the 2006 National Census, the village's population was 266 in 76 households. The following census in 2011 counted 254 people in 87 households. The 2016 census measured the population of the village as 276 people in 93 households.
