= Kakerun =

Kakerun كاكرون
- Village
- Location within Iran
- Coordinates: 36°00′01″N 52°53′44″E
- Country: Iran
- Province: Mazandaran
- County: Savadkuh
- Bakhsh: Central
- Rural District: Valupey

Population (2006)
  - Total: 44
- Time zone: UTC+3:30 (IRST)

Kakerun (Persian: كاكرون, also Romanized as Kākerūn and Kākarūn; also known as Kākerān) is a village in Valupey Rural District, in the Central District of Savadkuh County, Mazandaran Province, Iran. At the 2006 census, its population was 44, in 21 families. In the 2016 census the population of the village was not reported as it had less than 4 households.
