= Estarkhi, Shirvan =

Village in North Khorasan province, Iran

Estarkhi Persian: اسطرخي
- Village
- Location within Iran
- Coordinates: 37°11′07″N 57°51′21″E
- Country: Iran
- Province: North Khorasan
- County: Shirvan
- District: Central
- Rural District: Golian

Population (2016)
  - Total: 464
- Time zone: UTC+3:30 (IRST)

Estarkhi (Persian: اسطرخي) (Note: Also romanized as Esţarkhī; also known as Esţakhrī and Estalkhī) is a village in Golian Rural District of the Central District in Shirvan County, North Khorasan province, Iran.

== Demographics ==
=== Population ===
At the time of the 2006 National Census, the village's population was 1,098 in 266 households. The following census in 2011 counted 762 people in 201 households. The 2016 census measured the population of the village as 464 people in 162 households.
