= Savad Rudbar =

Savad Rudbar سوادرودبار
- Village
- Location within Iran
- Coordinates: 36°03′24″N 52°45′37″E
- Country: Iran
- Province: Mazandaran
- County: Savadkuh
- Bakhsh: Central
- Rural District: Valupey

Population (2016)
  - Total: 57
- Time zone: UTC+3:30 (IRST)

Savad Rudbar (Persian: سوادرودبار, also Romanized as Savād Rūdbār and Savād-e Rūd Bār) is a village in Valupey Rural District, in the Central District of Savadkuh County, Mazandaran Province, Iran.

At the time of the 2006 National Census, the village's population was 125 in 44 households. The following census in 2011 counted 87 people in 40 households. The 2016 census measured the population of the village as 57 people in 32 households.
