= Armando E. Giuliano =

American surgical oncologist

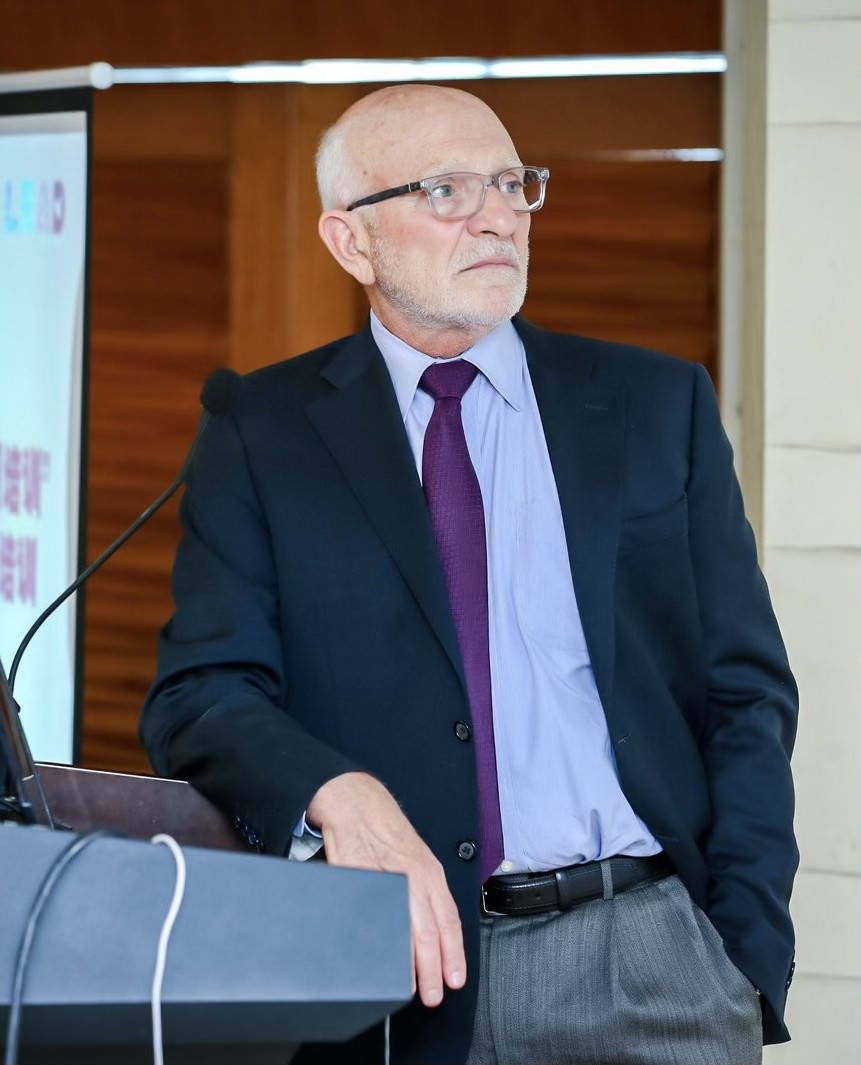
- Giuliano in 2019
- Born: Long Island, New York
- Title: Linda and Jim Lippman Chair in Surgical Oncology and co-director of Saul and Joyce Brandman Breast Center at Cedars-Sinai Medical Center
- Spouse: Cheryl Giuliano
- Children: Christopher and Amanda

Academic background
- Education: The University of Chicago Pritzker School of Medicine

Academic work
- Main interests: Clinical Oncology and Tumor Biology
- Notable works: Sentinel Lymph Node Biopsy, The Z0011 Trial

Armando Elario Giuliano is a surgical oncologist, surgeon scientist and medical professor in Los Angeles, California, United States of America. He is the Linda and Jim Lippman Chair in Surgical Oncology and co-director of Saul and Joyce Brandman Breast Center at Cedars-Sinai Medical Center, Los Angeles.

== Early life and education ==
Giuliano was born in Long Island, New York in 1947 where he completed his primary education. He went to Fordham University in Bronx, New York for college. He pursued his medical education at University of Chicago Medical School and completed his medical degree in 1973. During medical school, Giuliano worked with George Block, who later acted as an inspiration for Giuliano to pursue a career in surgery.

== Training and medical career ==
Giuliano is an American Board of Surgery-certified surgical oncologist focusing on breast oncology. He completed his general surgery training at University of California, San Francisco in 1980. During training, he was initially interested in vascular surgery, "my favorite operation to this day is carotid endarterectomy”, says Giuliano in an interview with Bruce L. Gewertz, the ex-Chairman of Surgery at Cedars Sinai. During residency, Giuliano was recommended by the Chief of Surgery at UCSF, F. William Blaisdell, to pursue a research fellowship in surgical oncology at the University of California, Los Angeles with Donald Morton. It was during his time with Morton that Giuliano developed a passion for surgical oncology.

=== Sentinel lymph node biopsy ===
The concept of sentinel lymph node biopsy in breast surgery is one of the major contributions of Giuliano to modern day breast cancer management. He inherited the idea of sentinel node biopsy from his mentor Morton in early 1990s, who at that time was using the technique for skin melanoma management. Initially, Giuliano was doubtful of the application of this technique in management of breast cancer, though upon encouragement from Morton, Giuliano decided to give it a shot. In 1991, Morton and Giuliano founded the John Wayne Cancer Institute in Santa Monica, California. The standard of care for breast cancer surgery at that time was to remove all of the axillary lymph nodes, which is a highly morbid procedure resulting in complications such as lymphedema, chronic pain, swelling and immobility of the upper extremity. Giuliano and his then clinical fellow, Daniel Kirgan, brainstormed several experiments to test the applicability of sentinel lymph node biopsy in breast cancer. This led to experiments that generated data that were ultimately published in Giuliano's paper pioneering the technique of sentinel lymph node biopsy in breast cancer. The paper was published in Annals of Surgery in 1994. “We inject a blue dye into the patient’s breast tumor and look for a node that takes up the dye, the theory being, if that tumor drains first to that lymph node, it was the first one to have the cancer,” he said. This paper was followed by numerous other studies, including The National Surgical Adjuvant Breast and Bowel Project Trial B-32 (NSABP B-32 trial) showing that if the sentinel lymph node is negative, formal axillary lymph node dissection can be safely avoided.

=== Z011 trial ===
The concept of sentinel lymph node biopsy was rapidly adapted by surgeons around the country. However, Giuliano wondered if the sentinel node is positive would it be safe to take just that node and leave the others behind? This could potentially avoid axillary dissection, although there would be a possibility that remaining nodes may have the disease. The American College of Surgeons Oncology Group (ACOSOG) Z0011 trial was conducted to answer this question. Giuliano authored the results of the Z0011 trial which showed that for women with T1 or T2 primary invasive breast cancer, without palpable axillary lymphadenopathy, and one or two nodes positive for malignancy, the ten-year survival for patients treated with sentinel lymph node biopsy alone was non-inferior to overall survival of patients treated with formal axillary lymph node dissection. This study was featured on the front page of The New York Times.

Giuliano has authored over 500 peer-reviewed articles with around 45,000 citations. During his academic career, he has served as the President of Society of Surgical Oncology, member of Board of Directors of Alliance for Clinical Trials in Oncology, and the President of International Sentinel Node Society. He has delivered lectures on clinical oncology and tumor biology at national and international forums. He joined Cedars-Sinai Medical Center in 2011 where he continues to investigate new ways to manage breast cancer, and works with a multi-disciplinary team to provide care to patients with range of breast pathologies. He also serves as the Program Director of Breast Surgical Oncology and Complex Surgical Oncology fellowship programs at Cedars-Sinai Medical Center.

== Personal life ==
Giuliano met his wife, Cheryl Giuliano, in seventh grade in Long Island and they have been together for over 60 years. She is a retired English lecturer and ex-director of writing programs at UCLA. "She’s never helped me with one of my papers, by the way,” chuckled Giuliano. They have twin children together.
