= Varg, Iran =

Village in North Khorasan province, Iran

Varg Persian: ورگ
- Village
- Location within Iran
- Coordinates: 37°18′55″N 57°56′27″E
- Country: Iran
- Province: North Khorasan
- County: Shirvan
- District: Central
- Rural District: Golian

Population (2016)
  - Total: 452
- Time zone: UTC+3:30 (IRST)

Varg (Persian: ورگ) (Note: Also known as Varak) is a village in Golian Rural District of the Central District in Shirvan County, North Khorasan province, Iran.

== Demographics ==
=== Population ===
At the time of the 2006 National Census, the village's population was 595 in 157 households. The following census in 2011 counted 525 people in 151 households. The 2016 census measured the population of the village as 452 people in 138 households.
