= Esparz =

Esparz اسپرز
- Village
- Interactive map of Esparz
- Coordinates: 36°05′34″N 52°43′54″E
- Country: Iran
- Province: Mazandaran
- County: Savadkuh
- Bakhsh: Central
- Rural District: Valupey

Population (2016)
  - Total: 27
- Time zone: UTC+3:30 (IRST)

Esparz (Persian: اسپرز) is a village in Valupey Rural District, in the Central District of Savadkuh County, Mazandaran Province, Iran. At the 2016 census, its population was 27, in 8 families.
