= Marie-Christine Giuliani-Sterrer =

Austrian politician (born 1965)

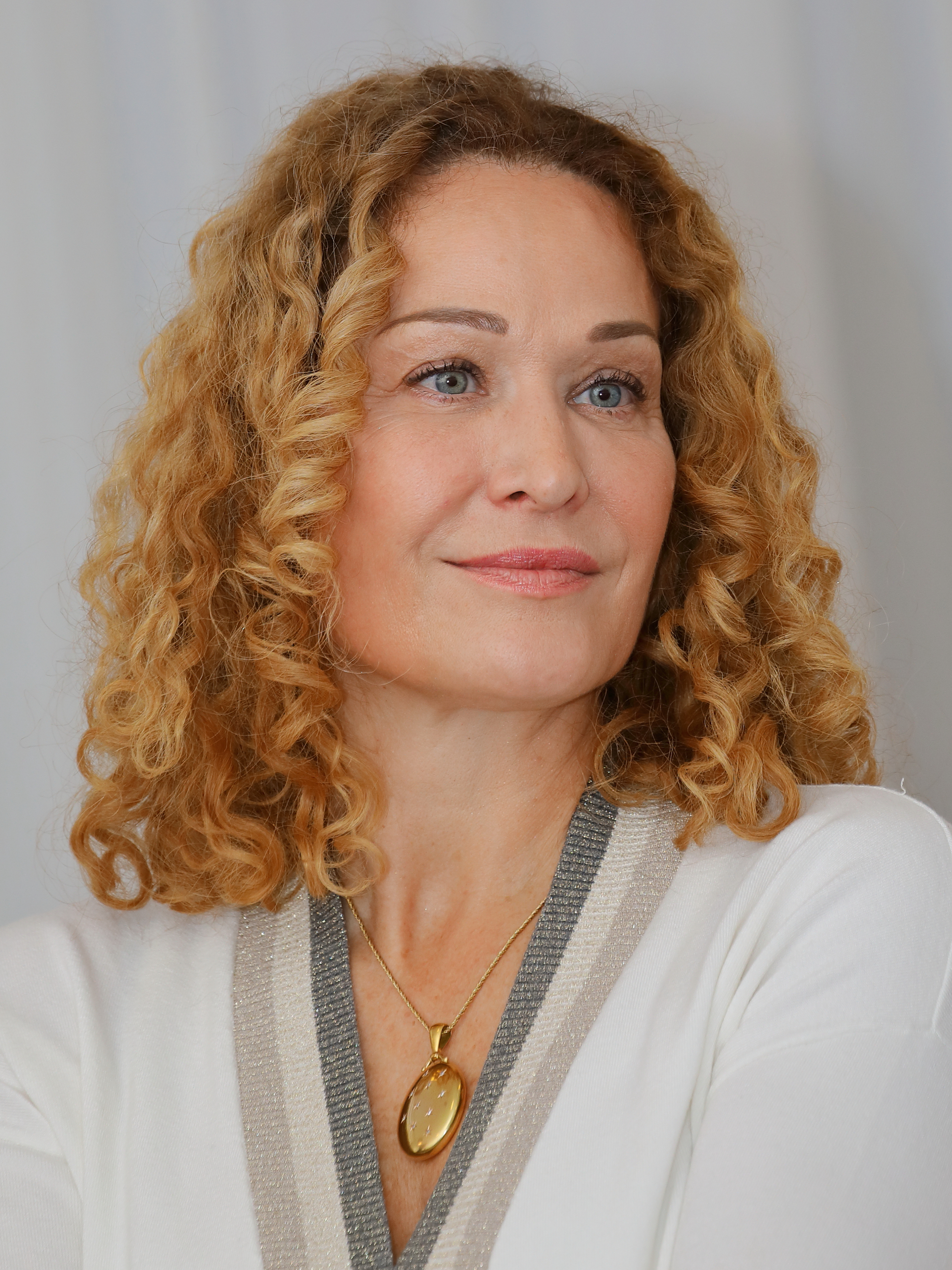
- Giuliani-Sterrer in 2019

Member of the National Council
- Incumbent
- Assumed office 24 October 2024
- Constituency: Federal list

Personal details
- Born: 26 February 1965 (age 61)
- Party: Freedom Party

Marie-Christine Giuliani-Sterrer (born 26 February 1965) is an Austrian politician of the Freedom Party serving as a member of the National Council since 2024.

Giuliani-Sterrer worked as a journalist for FPOe-TV since 2021. From 2018 she practised psychotherapy mainly coaching women. Between 2000–2016 Giuliani-Sterrer had hosted the Austrian Lotteries' “Bingo” TV show on ORF.

== Political positions ==
During the Corona pandemic Giuliani-Sterrer opposed vaccinations. She criticizes the lack of data on vaccinated cancer sufferers in Austria.

Marie-Christine Giuliani-Sterrer believes the ORF exerts profoundly undemocratic effects.

In October 2026 Giuliani-Sterrer called for early elections.

== See also ==
- List of members of the 28th National Council of Austria
