= Goliyan, Hamadan =

Goliyan گليان
- Village
- Location within Iran
- Coordinates: 34°25′26″N 48°14′28″E
- Country: Iran
- Province: Hamadan
- County: Tuyserkan
- Bakhsh: Qolqol Rud
- Rural District: Qolqol Rud

Population (2006)
  - Total: 151
- Time zone: UTC+3:30 (IRST)
  - Summer (DST): UTC+4:30 (IRDT)

Goliyan (Persian: گليان, also Romanized as Golīyān, Golīān, and Golyān) is a village in Qolqol Rud Rural District, Qolqol Rud District, Tuyserkan County, Hamadan Province, Iran. At the 2006 census, its population was 151, in 34 families.
