= Golian, India =

Golian
- village
- Country: India
- State: Punjab

Languages
  - Official: Punjabi
- Time zone: UTC+5:30 (IST)

Golian is a village in the north Indian state of Punjab. It is located in the district Hoshiarpur.
