= Guliano Diaz =

Curaçaoan footballer

Personal information
- Date of birth: 24 February 1991 (age 35)
- Place of birth: Willemstad, Netherlands Antilles
- Position: Defender

Youth career
- VV Sittard
- 2003–2009: Fortuna Sittard

Senior career*
Years	Team	Apps	(Gls)
2009–2011	Fortuna Sittard	8	(0)
2011–2013	BSV Limburgia		
2011–2013	Heidebloem		
2015–????	Caesar		
- * Club domestic league appearances and goals as of 15:15, 13 April 2020 (UTC)

Guliano Diaz (born 24 February 1991) is a Curaçaoan former professional footballer who played as a defender for Fortuna Sittard, for whom he made 9 first-team appearances in all competitions, before leaving the club in January 2011. After leaving professional football he combined his amateur career (playing for BSV Limburgia, Heidebloem, and Caesar) with working as a barista.
