= Elias (footballer, born 1993) =

Brazilian footballer

Personal information
- Full name: Elias dos Santos Bueno
- Date of birth: 17 September 1993 (age 33)
- Place of birth: Porto Alegre, Brazil
- Height: 1.69 m (5 ft 7 in)
- Position: Winger

Team information
- Current team: Inter SM

Youth career
- –2013: São Luiz

Senior career*
Years	Team	Apps	(Gls)
2013–2015	São Luiz	6	(1)
2014	→ Panambi (loan)	5	(0)
2015	→ Palmeirense (loan)	0	(0)
2016–2019	Aimoré	10	(1)
2016	→ Brasil de Pelotas (loan)	18	(2)
2017	→ Figueirense (loan)	2	(0)
2017	→ Brasil de Pelotas (loan)	14	(0)
2018	→ Joinville (loan)	14	(0)
2018	→ CRB (loan)	8	(0)
2019	Avenida	8	(0)
2019	→ Brasil de Pelotas (loan)	6	(0)
2020	São Luiz	7	(3)
2020	América-RN	17	(3)
2021	Novo Hamburgo	7	(0)
2021	Lemense	2	(0)
2020	Gama	3	(2)
2022	Juazeirense	5	(1)
2022	São Luiz	7	(3)
2022	Afogados da Ingazeira	4	(1)
2022	Ferroviário	1	(0)
2023–	Inter SM	0	(0)
- * Club domestic league appearances and goals as of 21:17, 26 February 2023 (UTC)

Elias dos Santos Bueno (born 17 September 1993), known as Elias, is a Brazilian professional footballer who plays as a winger for Inter SM.

== Career ==
Elias was born in Porto Alegre, and has starred in several clubs of the gaúcho football, as São Luiz, Panambi and Palmeirense. Before coming to Brasil de Pelotas, Elias was in Aimoré. Started his career playing with São Luiz. He made his professional debut during the 2013 season.
