= Valeh, Mazandaran =

Valeh واله
- Village
- Location within Iran
- Coordinates: 35°59′25″N 52°49′35″E
- Country: Iran
- Province: Mazandaran
- County: Savadkuh
- Bakhsh: Central
- Rural District: Valupey

Population (2016)
  - Total: 46
- Time zone: UTC+3:30 (IRST)

Valeh (Persian: واله, also Romanized as Vāleh) is a village in Valupey Rural District, in the Central District of Savadkuh County, Mazandaran Province, Iran. It has a cold, mountainous climate.

At the time of the 2006 National Census, the village's population was 63 in 21 households. The following census in 2011 recorded less than 4 households. The 2016 census measured the population of the village as 46 people in 22 households.
