= Gelian, Mazandaran =

Gelian گليان
- Village
- Location within Iran
- Coordinates: 36°03′51″N 52°50′54″E
- Country: Iran
- Province: Mazandaran
- County: Savadkuh
- Bakhsh: Central
- Rural District: Valupey

Population (2016)
  - Total: 94
- Time zone: UTC+3:30 (IRST)

Gelian (Persian: گليان, also Romanized as Gelīān) is a village in Valupey Rural District, in the Central District of Savadkuh County, Mazandaran Province, Iran.

At the time of the 2006 National Census, the village's population was 41 in 15 households. The following census in 2011 counted 21 people in 8 households. The 2016 census measured the population of the village as 94 people in 36 households.
