= Mashhad Torqi-ye Olya =

Village in North Khorasan province, Iran

Mashhad Torqi-ye Olya Persian: مشهدطرقي عليا
- Village
- Location within Iran
- Coordinates: 37°18′46″N 57°48′13″E
- Country: Iran
- Province: North Khorasan
- County: Shirvan
- District: Central
- Rural District: Golian

Population (2016)
  - Total: 308
- Time zone: UTC+3:30 (IRST)

Mashhad Torqi-ye Olya (Persian: مشهدطرقي عليا) (Note: Also romanized as Mashhad Ţorqī-ye ‘Olyā; also known as Mashhad Ţorqī-ye Bālā) is a village in Golian Rural District of the Central District in Shirvan County, North Khorasan province, Iran.

== Demographics ==
=== Population ===
At the time of the 2006 National Census, the village's population was 314 in 84 households. The following census in 2011 counted 251 people in 81 households. The 2016 census measured the population of the village as 308 people in 112 households.
