= Zangian, Kerman =

Zangian زنجيان
- Village
- Location within Iran
- Coordinates: 28°35′00″N 57°42′30″E
- Country: Iran
- Province: Kerman
- County: Jiroft
- Bakhsh: Central
- Rural District: Khatunabad

Population (2006)
  - Total: 627
- Time zone: UTC+3:30 (IRST)
  - Summer (DST): UTC+4:30 (IRDT)

Zangian (Persian: زنگيان, also Romanized as Zangīān, Zangeyān, and Zangiyan) is a village in Khatunabad Rural District, in the Central District of Jiroft County, Kerman Province, Iran. At the 2006 census, its population was 627, in 134 families.
