= Golyan Group =

Nepalese business enterprise

- Founded: 1960
- Founder: Mr. Sohan Lal Golyan
- Type: Private
- Headquarters: Kathmandu, Nepal
- Products: Agriculture, Manufacturing, Real Estate & Hospitality, Renewable Energy, Banking & Insurance.
- Key people: Akshay Golyan (Chairman and Managing Director)
- Revenue: USD 400 Million (2022)
- Employees: 10,000+
- Website: golyan.com

Golyan Group is a business conglomerate with its headquarters in Kathmandu, Nepal. The group comprises 25 companies operating across sectors such as manufacturing, agriculture, real estate and hospitality, and renewable energy. It reportedly has an annual turnover of approximately US$400 million and employs around 10,000 people.

Golyan Group exports to more than 60 countries across all continents, serving diverse markets.

== Board ==
Golyan Group is a family-owned business. The board of directors consists of the following.

Position	Personnel
Chairman Emeritus	Pawan Golyan
Chairman and Managing Director	Akshay Golyan
Vice Chairman	Basu Dev Golyan
Director	Shakti Golyan
Director	Anant Golyan

== Businesses ==
Golyan Group is a business conglomerate in Nepal with a diverse portfolio of companies operating across various sectors. The group's primary business verticals include agriculture, manufacturing, real estate and hospitality, renewable energy.

== Janata Agro and Forestry Limited ==
Janata Agro and Forestry Limited specializes in agricultural and forestry products. It signed a Memorandum of Understanding (MoU) with Kasetsart University, Thailand to promote organic farming and advanced agricultural practices in Nepal. The agreement was signed on April 2, 2025 by Janata Agro President Mr. Pawan Golyan and Kasetsart University Vice President Dr. Krit Won-in, aiming to modernize Nepal's agricultural sector.

== MATO ==
MATO is an FMCG brand of Golyan Group, launched in 2019 with an aim to revive Nepal's agricultural sector, empower farmers, and promote sustainable farming practices. Mato is the Nepali word for soil, aims to scale agricultural production across Nepal by establishing strong demand links in both domestic and international markets.

== Ashapuri ==
Ashapuri Organic is an organic company based in Nepal, founded in 2002 with the establishment of Ashapuri Organic Farm. The company is committed to promoting and producing organic tea and coffee. Ashapuri Organic Farm is a 100% certified organic ensuring organic farming practices, which involve using natural fertilizers and pesticides and avoiding genetically modified organisms.

== Manufacturing ==
=== Reliance Spinning Mills Ltd. ===
Reliance Spinning Mills Ltd. (RSML), established in 1994 A.D. is the largest spinning mills in Nepal with an investment of NPR. 15.5 Billion. The company operates two factories: Unit A located at Khanar, Sunsari, and Unit B located at Duhabi, Sunsari, Nepal. RSML utilizes machinery from textile machinery manufacturers such as LMW, Savio, Schlafhorst/Saurer, Vijay Laxmi, Peass, Mylon, Murata, Rieter & Aalidhra Textool.

RSML manufactures Polyester, Viscose, and Acrylic, and their various blends in grey, dyed, melange yarn & DTV yarns. The company is the single largest exporting company of Nepal with annual exports around NPR 7.70 Billion (2024-2025) and has also received awards for providing highest employment opportunities in the country. After the commissioning of two production lines in June 2023, the company's installed capacity brings the total production to 139MT of yarn per day.

Initial Public Offering

RSML opened its IPO in December 2025. The company is the second in Nepal to issue shares using the book-building method.

=== Tricot Nepal ===
Tricot Industries was established in 1999 A.D., Tricot Industries specialises in fine knitwear with the largest knitting unit in the country and exports in global markets. In addition to cashmere, it crafts premium garments from wool, silk, linen, and organic cotton.

=== Shivam Plastic Industry ===
Established in 2000, Shivam Plastic Industry Ltd. is a manufacturer of Polypropylene woven fabric. Polypropylene woven fabric has replaced jute in most instances and is used for various industrial and packaging solutions. Its products are sold both in the domestic market and exported, primarily to India. Shivam Plastic Industry is a joint venture of the Golyan Group family and the Agarwal family. It is also Nepal's sole manufacturer of Super Paulin, a very strong, light-weight and water-resistant tarpaulin.

== Renewable energy ==
Golyan Group has investments in 800 MW of combined hydro and solar power. 14 projects are at different stages of development and construction.

Golyan Power has entered into a joint venture agreement with Prozeal Green Energy Nepal to collaborate on solar power projects across the country.

=== Hydropower ===
- Balephi Hydropower Ltd. - 36 MW
- Upper Balephi Hydropower Ltd. - 46 MW
- Mizu Energy Ltd. - 54 MW
- KBNR Isuwa Power Ltd. - 97.2 MW
- Apollo Energy Pvt. Ltd - 89.7 MW
- Elevate Energy Pvt. Ltd. - 191.4 MW

Balephi Hydropower Limited has been generating electricity since November, 2022. Other hydropower projects are in different phases of development. Apollo Energy Pvt. Ltd. and Elevate Energy Pvt. Ltd. have received a technical assistance grant from the US International Development Finance Corporation (DFC) for the engineering and environmental study of the project.

=== Solar ===
- Pure Energy Ltd. - 20 MW
- Positive Energy Pvt. Ltd (I & II) - 20 MW
- Sol Power Ltd - 100 MW
- Rapti Urja Pvt. Ltd - 50 MW

Pure Energy Ltd. is a flagship investment of the Golyan Group. It became a public listed company in January 2025. It comprises two blocks – Pure Energy I and Pure Energy II – located in Banke District, with a combined capacity of 20 MW. Pure Energy II achieved operational status and commenced commissioning in May 2023, while Pure Energy I started operations in December 2023. Other solar projects are in different stages of development.

== Real Estate and Hospitality ==
=== Hyatt Centric Soalteemode Kathmandu ===
Hyatt Hotels Corporation and City Hotel Limited rebranded Hyatt Place Kathmandu into Hyatt Centric Soalteemode Kathmandu, making it the first Hyatt Centric branded hotel in Nepal. Hyatt Centric Soalteemode is the first pet-friendly hotel in Nepal.

=== Golyan Tower ===
Golyan Tower is the headquarters of Golyan Group located in Mid-Baneshwor, Kathmandu.

The Residences at Hyatt Centric

The Residences at Hyatt Centric, Soalteemode is one of the residential apartments, located in Soalteemode, Kathmandu.

Hyatt Regency Lumbini

Hyatt Regency Lumbini is a 175-room resort set to open in Lumbini by 2029. It marks Hyatt's fourth-brand presence in Nepal —and is the second property in partnership with Golyan Group.

== Corporate social responsibility ==
Golyan Group has provided educational and healthcare support to families of Gen-Z martyrs. The initiative includes educational support for 31 children through Class 12 and lifetime health insurance coverage for 43 parents of the martyrs.

== Workplace Culture ==
Golyan Group workplace culture and engagement initiative fosters communication, collaboration, and active employee involvement through multiple programs and initiatives like the first season of Vaarta - An Open Conversation with CMD, Mr. Akshay Golyan.

The initiative continued with its second season, Vaarta – The Next Chapter, which included Ignite The Build, an employee pitching programme focused on business development, workplace efficiency, and community initiatives. The second season brought together all five members of the Board, expanding the leadership participation within the initiative.

== Global Recognition ==
Rotary International Director (2027–2029): Mr. Basu Dev Golyan, Vice Chairman of Golyan Group, was elected as Rotary International Director for Zones 5 & 6 becoming the first Nepali ever to hold this global position.

== Awards and honors ==
Social responsibility recognition

Golyan Group was honored by the Gen-Z Shahid Pariwar Kalyankari Samaj for its continued support to "Gen-Z martyrs’ families, including education for 31 children through Class 12 and lifetime health insurance for 43 parents" (2026).

Energy sector recognition

Mr. Sanjay Kumar Sah received the "Excellence in Finance & Investment Leadership" award at Nepal Clean Energy Week 2026.

Mr. Prawin Aryal received "Excellence in Business Management Leadership" award at Nepal Clean Energy Week 2026.

Pure Energy Limited received the "Best Project O&M Team of the Year" award at Nepal Clean Energy Week 2026.

Golyan Group received the "Best Clean Energy Team" & "Renewable Energy Finance & Investment Leadership" award at Nepal Clean Energy Week 2026.

Pure Energy was awarded Solar Company of the Year (Developer – Platinum category) at the Leadership Awards (2024).

Export and trade-related recognition

Tricot Industries received the Export Excellence Award (2025) from Lalitpur Chamber of Commerce and Industry (LCCI).

Tricot Industries received a Letter of Excellence for FY 81-82 from the Federation of Export Entrepreneurs Nepal (FEEN).

Tricot Industries was listed as a top exporter for FY 81-82 by TIA Customs, Ministry of Finance, Government of Nepal.

Reliance Spinning Mills received the Best Exporter and Employer Award (2025) from the Biratnagar Customs Department.

Reliance Spinning Mills received recognition for highest social security fund contributions in the manufacturing sector form the Social Security Fund, Nepal (2083).

Reliance Spinning Mills received an Excellence Award for Value-added Export (2022) from Growth Sellers (HRM Nepal Awards).

Reliance Spinning Mills received an Industrial Relations Award (2022) from HR Meet.

Reliance Spinning Mills received the Top Employment Provider Award (2020) from the Nepal Foreign Trade Association.

Reliance Spinning Mills received the Highest Employer and Exporter recognition (2024) from the Nepal Foreign Trade Association.

Individual recognition

Akshay Golyan and Shakti Golyan were designated as Commercially Important Persons (CIP) by Government of Nepal (2025).

Pawan Golyan and Akshay Golyan were designated as Commercially Important Persons (CIP) by the Government of Nepal (2020).

Pawan Golyan received the CEO of the Year (Public Choice) award (2019) from Padma Media Group.

Pawan Golyan received the Business Leader of the Year award (2018) from the World HRD Congress.

Akshay Golyan received the Corporate Business Award for Best Hotel & Tourism (2024) from Corporate Media Group.
