= María Dolores Juliano =

Argentine cultural anthropologist (1932–2022)

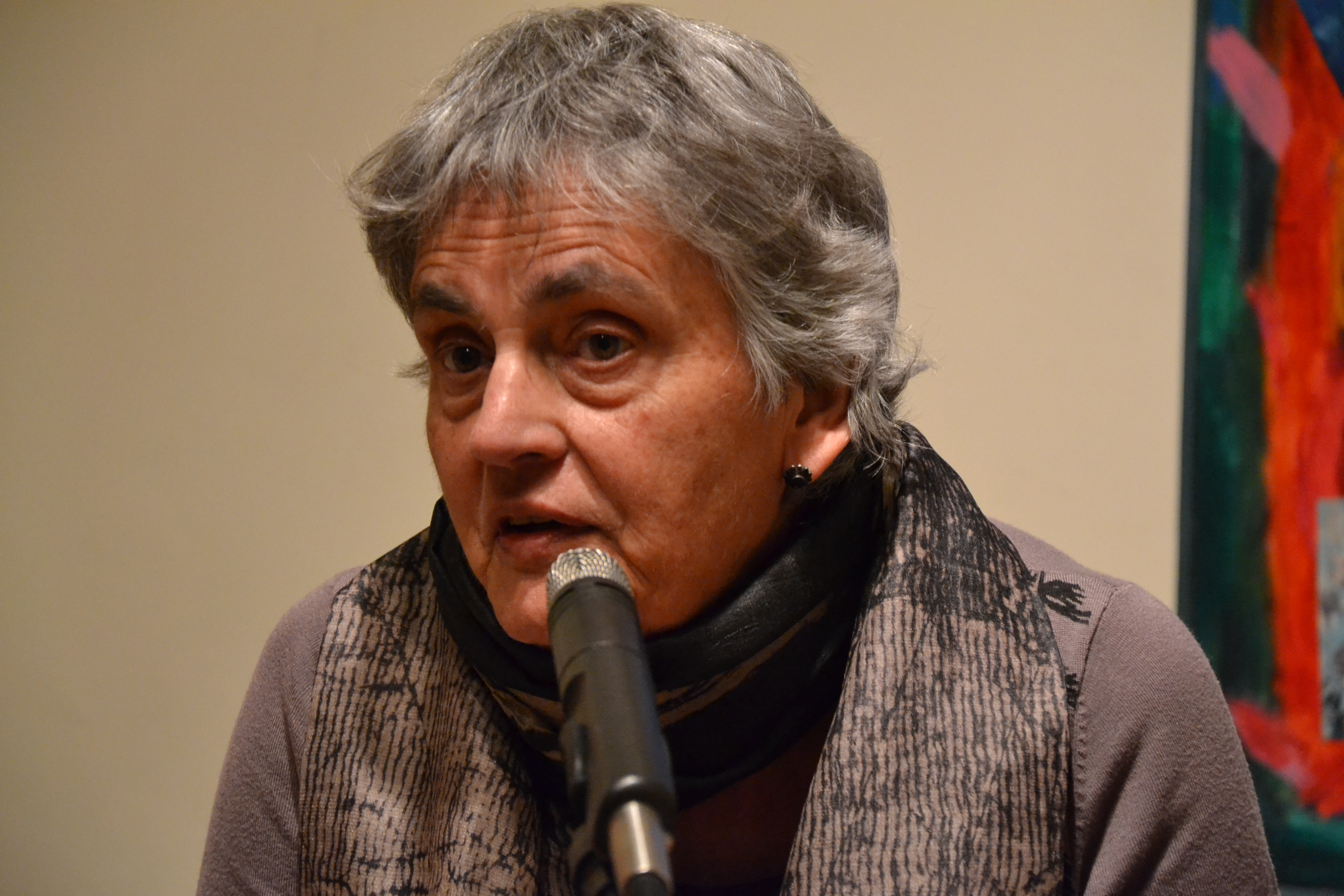
- Born: María Dolores Juliano Corregido; 22 September 1932; Necochea, Argentina
- Died: 26 November 2022 (aged 90); Barcelona, Spain
- Education: University of Mar del Plata; University of Barcelona
- Occupation: Anthropologist
- Awards: Creu de Sant Jordi (2010)

María Dolores Juliano Corregido (22 September 1932 – 26 November 2022) was an Argentine cultural and social anthropologist based in Spain.

== Biography ==
María Dolores Juliano was born in Necochea in 1932. She trained as a teacher, studied pedagogy, and earned a licentiate in anthropology at the University of Mar del Plata, graduating in 1975. After the 1976 coup that led to the civic-military dictatorship of Jorge Rafael Videla, she was forced into exile.

Juliano settled in Barcelona, where she completed her doctorate at the University of Barcelona (UB) with the thesis Integración y marginación en la cultura rural catalana. Análisis de endoculturación (Integration and Marginalization in Catalan Rural Culture: Endoculturation Analysis). In 1977 she became a professor of anthropology at UB's Faculty of Geography and History, a position she held until her retirement in 2001.

Juliano published numerous studies on the anthropology of education, migratory movements, ethnic minorities, gender studies, and social exclusion. Her scientific output has always been accompanied by a relevant social and feminist commitment.

In 2002, she appeared before the Spanish Senate's Commission on Prostitution as a contributor to the drafting of its final report.

In 2010, she was awarded the Creu de Sant Jordi for her academic career and valuable research results.

In 2021, she received the LASA/Oxfam America Martin Diskin Memorial Lectureship for her activism on behalf of marginalized sectors of society.

Juliano, along with Teresa del Valle and Verena Stolcke, is one of the principal subjects of Pioneras – Aitzindariak, a documentary directed by Inge Mendioroz about the origins of feminist anthropology in Spain in parallel with the anthropological discipline.

== Selected publications ==
- Cultura popular [Popular Culture] (in Spanish). Barcelona: Anthropos. 1985. ISBN 9788476580066. OCLC 433385739.
- El juego de las astucias. Mujer y mensajes sociales alternativos [The Game of Tricks: Women and Construction of Alternative Social Models] (in Spanish). Horas y Horas. 1992. ISBN 9788487715129.
- Educación intercultural. Escolarización y minorías étnicas [Intercultural Education: Schooling and Ethnic Minorities] (in Spanish). Madrid: Eudema. 1993. ISBN 9788477541431. OCLC 640032505.
- Chiapas, una rebelión sin dogmas [Chiapas, a Rebellion Without Dogmas] (in Spanish). Casa de la Solidaritat. 1995.
- La causa saharaui y las mujeres [The Saharawi Cause and Women] (in Spanish). Barcelona: Icaria. 1998. ISBN 9788474263541. OCLC 39196107.
- Las que saben...Subculturas de mujeres [Those Who Know...Women's Subcultures] (in Spanish). Madrid: Horas y Horas. 1998. ISBN 9788487715662. OCLC 41649862.
- La prostitución: el espejo oscuro [Prostitution: The Dark Mirror] (in Spanish). Barcelona: Icaria. 2001. ISBN 9788474265590. OCLC 50721045.
- Excluidas y marginales: una aproximación antropológica [Excluded and Marginal: An Anthropological Approach] (in Spanish). Ediciones Cátedra. 2004. ISBN 9788437621630. OCLC 60555181.
- Juliano, María Dolores; Piérola, Mabel (2004). Marita y las mujeres en la calle [Marita and the Women in the Street] (in Spanish). Barcelona: Bellaterra. ISBN 9788472902558. OCLC 803163967.
- Las otras mujeres: la construcción de la exclusión social [The Other Women: The Construction of Social Exclusion] (in Spanish). 2006.
- Presunción de inocencia. Riesgo, delito y pecado en femenino [Presumption of Innocence: Female Risk, Crime, and Sin] (in Spanish). San Sebastian: Gakoa. 2011. ISBN 9788496993228. OCLC 865272290.
- La pluma de la lechuza [The Pen and the Owl] (in Spanish). 2015. Novel.
- Tomar la palabra. Mujeres, discursos y silencios [Taking the Floor: Women, Speeches, and Silences] (in Spanish). Barcelona: Bellaterra. 2017. ISBN 9788472908253. OCLC 993559036.
- La magia de la razón. Memorias imaginarias de Cristina de Suecia [The Magic of Reason: Imaginary Memories of Christina of Sweden] (in Spanish). Dado. 2021. ISBN 9788412442410.
