= Siege of Temesvár =

There have been several Sieges of Temesvár (today: Timișoara) in history of Hungary:

- Siege of Temesvár (1514)
- Siege of Temesvár (1551)
- Siege of Temesvár (1552)
- Siege of Temeşvar (1596)
- Siege of Temeşvar (1689)
- Siege of Temeşvar (1696)
- Siege of Temeşvar (1716)
- Siege of Temesvár (1849)
- Siege of Timişoara (1944)
