= Mashhad Torqi-ye Sofla =

Village in North Khorasan province, Iran

Mashhad Torqi-ye Sofla Persian: مشهدطرقي سفلي
- Village
- Location within Iran
- Coordinates: 37°19′00″N 57°48′38″E
- Country: Iran
- Province: North Khorasan
- County: Shirvan
- District: Central
- Rural District: Golian

Population (2016)
  - Total: 300
- Time zone: UTC+3:30 (IRST)

Mashhad Torqi-ye Sofla (Persian: مشهدطرقي سفلي) (Note: Also romanized as Mashāād Tarqī-ye ‘Sofla, Mashāād Torqī-ye ‘Sofla, and Mashhad Ţarqī-ye Soflá; also known as Mashhad Ţarqī and Mashhad Ţorqī-ye Pā’īn) is a village in Golian Rural District of the Central District in Shirvan County, North Khorasan province, Iran.

== Demographics ==
=== Population ===
At the time of the 2006 National Census, the village's population was 383 in 98 households. The following census in 2011 counted 353 people in 113 households. The 2016 census measured the population of the village as 300 people in 104 households.
