= Golian, South Khorasan =

Golian گليان
- Village
- Location within Iran
- Coordinates: 32°45′00″N 59°14′00″E
- Country: Iran
- Province: South Khorasan
- County: Birjand
- Bakhsh: Central
- Rural District: Baqeran

Population (2006)
  - Total: 143
- Time zone: UTC+3:30 (IRST)
  - Summer (DST): UTC+4:30 (IRDT)

Golian (Persian: گليان, also Romanized as Golīān and Guliān) is a village in Baqeran Rural District, in the Central District of Birjand County, South Khorasan Province, Iran. At the 2006 census, its population was 143, in 42 families.
