= Guliana =

Guliana may refer to:

- Guliana, Gujrat
- Guliana, Rawalpindi
