= Golian, North Khorasan =

Village in North Khorasan province, Iran

Golian Persian: گليان
- Village
- Location within Iran
- Coordinates: 37°13′56″N 57°53′37″E
- Country: Iran
- Province: North Khorasan
- County: Shirvan
- District: Central
- Rural District: Golian

Population (2016)
  - Total: 598
- Time zone: UTC+3:30 (IRST)

Golian (Persian: گليان) (Note: Also romanized as Geleyān, Gelīān, Golīān, and Golīyān; also known as Gīlen) is a village in, and the capital of, Golian Rural District in the Central District of Shirvan County, North Khorasan province, Iran.

== Demographics ==
=== Population ===
At the time of the 2006 National Census, the village's population was 619 in 178 households. The following census in 2011 counted 441 people in 131 households. The 2016 census measured the population of the village as 598 people in 209 households.
