= Tanasvan =

Village in North Khorasan province, Iran

Tanasvan Persian: تنسوان
- Village
- Location within Iran
- Coordinates: 37°21′03″N 57°55′21″E
- Country: Iran
- Province: North Khorasan
- County: Shirvan
- District: Central
- Rural District: Golian

Population (2016)
  - Total: 371
- Time zone: UTC+3:30 (IRST)

Tanasvan (Persian: تنسوان) (Note: Also romanized as Tanasvān, Tansavān, and Tansevān; also known as Tansavār, Temesvar, and Temsavār) is a village in Golian Rural District of the Central District in Shirvan County, North Khorasan province, Iran.

== Demographics ==
=== Population ===
At the time of the 2006 National Census, the village's population was 353 in 78 households. The following census in 2011 counted 361 people in 101 households. The 2016 census measured the population of the village as 371 people in 113 households.
