= Juliano (footballer, born 1986) =

Brazilian footballer

Personal information
- Full name: Juliano André Pereira da Silva
- Date of birth: 13 October 1986 (age 40)
- Place of birth: Parapuã, São Paulo, Brazil
- Height: 1.82 m (6 ft 0 in)
- Position: Defender

Team information
- Current team: Novorizontino

Senior career*
Years	Team	Apps	(Gls)
2007–2008	Tricordiano		
2009	Osvaldo Cruz		
2010	Atlético Sorocaba		
2011–2012	União Barbarense		
2012	Juventude		
2013	União Barbarense		
2013	Avaí		
2014	Joinville		
2015	Foz do Iguaçu		
2015	FK Kukësi		
2016	Cabofriense		
2016–2019	Bragantino		
2019–	Novorizontino		
- * Club domestic league appearances and goals

Juliano André Pereira da Silva (born 13 October 1986 in Parapuã, São Paulo), commonly known as Juliano, is a Brazilian professional footballer who plays as a defender for Grêmio Novorizontino.
