= Zangian, Mazandaran =

Zangian زنگيان
- Village
- Location within Iran
- Coordinates: 36°03′29″N 52°56′15″E
- Country: Iran
- Province: Mazandaran
- County: Savadkuh
- Bakhsh: Central
- Rural District: Valupey

Population (2016)
  - Total: 46
- Time zone: UTC+3:30 (IRST)

Zangian (Persian: زنگيان, also Romanized as Zangīān) is a village in Valupey Rural District, in the Central District of Savadkuh County, Mazandaran Province, Iran.

At the time of the 2006 National Census, the village's population was 84 in 33 households. The following census in 2011 counted 153 people in 55 households. The 2016 census measured the population of the village as 46 people in 19 households.
