= Golian Rural District =

Rural district in North Khorasan province, Iran

Golian Rural District Persian: دهستان گليان
- Rural District
- Location within Iran
- Coordinates: 37°15′N 57°53′E
- Country: Iran
- Province: North Khorasan
- County: Shirvan
- District: Central
- Established: 1987
- Capital: Golian

Population (2016)
  - Total: 5,657
- Time zone: UTC+3:30 (IRST)

Golian Rural District (Persian: دهستان گليان) is in the Central District of Shirvan County, North Khorasan province, Iran. Its capital is the village of Golian.

== Demographics ==
=== Population ===
At the time of the 2006 National Census, the rural district's population was 7,889 in 1,995 households. There were 6,446 inhabitants in 1,864 households at the following census of 2011. The 2016 census measured the population of the rural district as 5,657 in 1,882 households. The most populous of its 21 villages was Razmeghan, with 856 people.

=== Other villages in the rural district ===
- Estarkhi
- Hesar-e Pahlavanlu
- Mashhad Torqi-ye Olya
- Mashhad Torqi-ye Sofla
- Molla Baqer
- Pir Shahid
- Tanasvan
- Varg
