= Lui Giuliani =

Australian businessman

Lui Giuliani is an Australian businessman.

== Business ==
After graduating with a Bachelor of Business from Curtin University, Giuliani spent 20 years at Ernst & Young, including seven as a partner.

After leaving Ernst & Young, Giuliani co-founded Primewest Capital Pty Ltd. He is currently managing director of Primewest.

== Perth Glory ==
Giuliani was appointed to the Perth Glory FC advisory committee in May 2008 after the departure of John Spence from the club. In February 2009, after the departure of Brett McKeon, Giuliani was appointed in an ambassadorial role as Deputy Chairman of the club. From early April 2009 he took on a short term role of acting chief executive officer until Paul Kelly was appointed.
