= Carmelo Giuliano =

Argentine footballer (born 1951)

Giuliano
Personal information
- Full name: Carmelo Héctor Giuliano González
- Date of birth: 14 June 1951 (age 75)
- Place of birth: Avellaneda, Argentina
- Height: 1.80 m (5 ft 11 in)
- Position: Libero

Youth career
- 1963–1971: Independiente

Senior career*
Years	Team	Apps	(Gls)
1971–1974	Independiente		
1974	→ Atlanta (loan)		
1974–1983	Hércules	212	(14)
- * Club domestic league appearances and goals as of 17 March 2011

Carmelo Héctor Giuliano González (born 14 June 1951), is a former Argentine football defender. He was born in Avellaneda and played for Hércules CF.

== Club career ==
When Club Atlético Independiente won the 1973 Intercontinental Cup, Giuliano was a substitute in the final. He joined Hércules on the recommendation of Miguel Ángel Santoro. He was one of the players with the most appearances in Hércules in La Liga. Although one of the most famous defenders of the La Liga, he was never in the national team. He retired after 30 years after an incident in a Copa del Rey match against Cartagena FC in 1980, during which he was injured by another player, Pedro Arango Segura. After his enforced retirement to Alicante, where he currently lives, he became a sports commentator on radio and television.

== Honours ==
Independiente

- Copa Interamericana: 1972
- Intercontinental Cup: 1973
