= Garm Khani, Mazandaran =

Garm Khani گرم خانی
- Village
- Interactive map of Garm Khani
- Coordinates: 35°57′52.65″N 52°49′24.33″E
- Country: Iran
- Province: Mazandaran
- County: Savadkuh
- Bakhsh: Central
- Rural District: Valupey

Population (2006)
  - Total: 44
- Time zone: UTC+3:30 (IRST)

Garm Khani (Persian: گرم خانی, also Romanized as Garm Khānī) is a village in Valupey Rural District, in the Central District of Savadkuh County, Mazandaran Province, Iran.

At the time of the 2006 National Census, the village's population was 44 in 10 households. There were no households residing in the village in 2016.
