= Giuliano Calore =

Italian racing cyclist

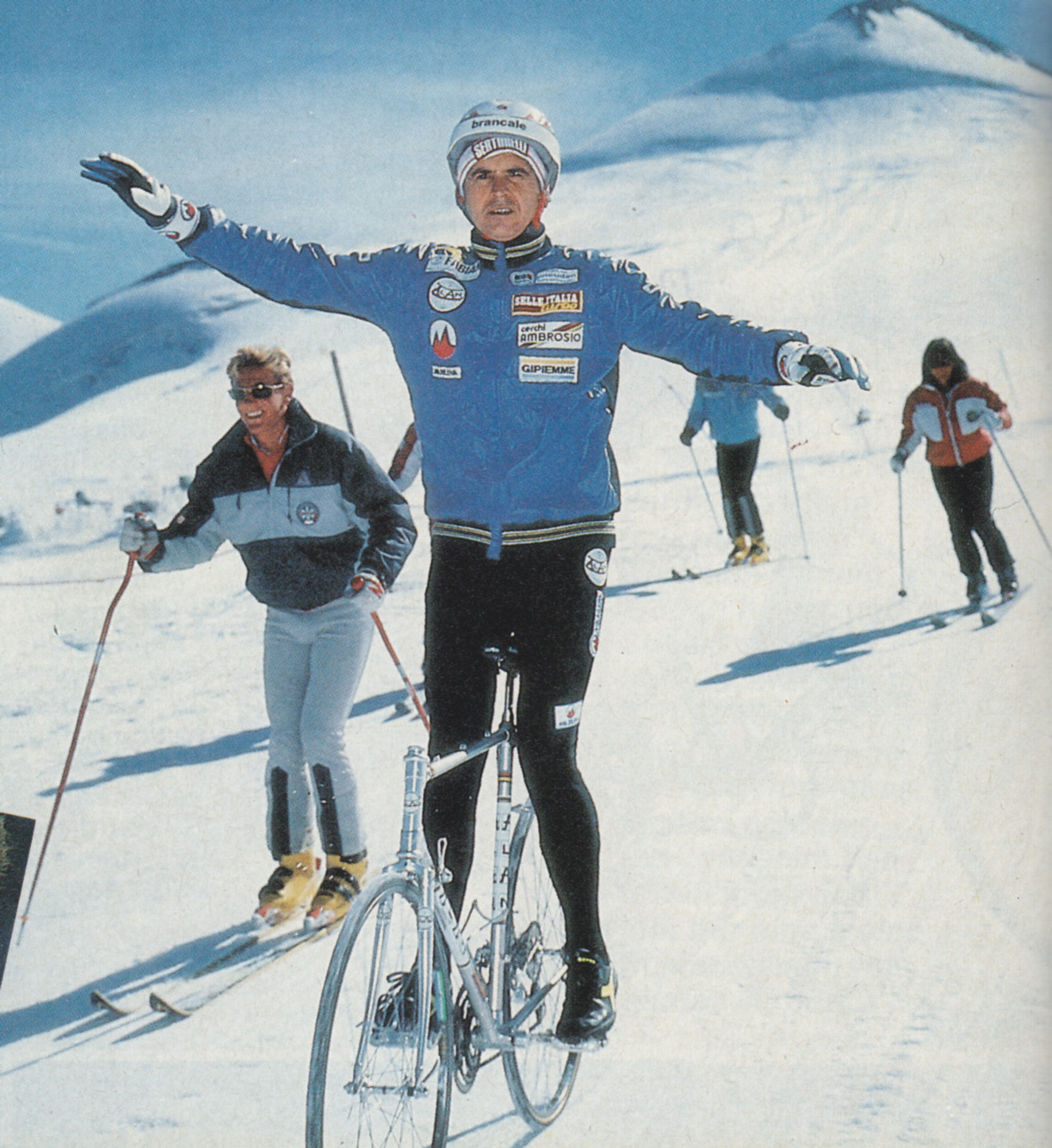

Personal information
- Born: 1938 (age 87–88) Padua, Italy

Cycling career
- Sport: Cycling
- Discipline: extreme biking

Giuliano Calore (born 1938) is an Italian former racing cyclist, world champion of extreme cycling, holder of 13 records and winner of 98 medals. From 1981 to 2011, he established 13 records in the Guinness Book of World Records.

== Filmography ==
- 48 Tornanti di Notte (2016)
