= Julianos Kattinis =

Greek painter

- Born: 1934 (age 91–92); Damascus, Syria
- Occupation: Painter

Julianos Kattinis (born 1934) is a Greek painter who lives and works in Rome, Italy.

== Biography ==
He was born in Damascus in 1934 to Theodoros Katinis and Despina Peridakis.

His father worked as a Greek engineer and built roads in the Middle East, causing his family to move often.

=== The Middle East ===
He attended the French private school “Frères Lazaristes” in Damascus and spent long periods in Jerusalem, Cairo and Amman. In Damascus, Kattinis took an active part in the cultural and intellectual life of the time. He was strongly attracted by the Archeological Museum of Damascus and Palmira, full of Mesopotamian, Greek, and Roman Art, from which he absorbed much of his inspiration and imagination for his work. The town of Deir ez-Zor near the Euphrates and Maaloula were a source of stimulation for his artistic life. The sky of the desert and the white and terracotta colors of Maaloula strongly attracted him and affected his way of painting. In 1957 he was invited by the Egyptian Cultural Center of Damascus [1] for his first exhibition. In 1961 the Modern Art Gallery in Damascus invited him to exhibit his work at the Salon National de Printemps and Salon d’Automne, where he could display the variety of forms and techniques, he had long experimented.

=== Europe ===
In 1961 Kattinis decided to leave the Middle East to go to Europe, wanting to engage in the culture of 60s Europe. He settled in Rome, the town that mostly suited his idea of beauty, and here he attended the Academy of Fine Arts, where he met and made friends with his teachers, the famous painters Mario Mafai, Nino Maccari, and Giuseppe Canali, and in 1964 got his Diploma in Fine Arts. In the same year he took part in the XXXII International Venice Biennal of Art with his abstract painting [2], extremely in vogue during that time in Italy. During the long periods spent in several European towns such as Paris, Athens, Vienna, Genève, Munich, Innsbruck, he visited their museums and came into contact with the cultural life of other countries. All this strongly affected him, causing a more independent turn of his painting into a personal sort of expressionism. He went back to the Middle East in 1965, invited by the French Cultural Center in Amman (Jordan) for a solo exhibition [3] and, in Beirut (Lebanon), for a solo exhibition at the Amateur d’Art gallery. In addition, the Sursock Museum of Beirut invited him for a group exhibition [4] where he had an opportunity to meet and confront artists of different countries. A year spent in Innsbruck (Austria) (1967–68), surrounded by the beauty of the white mountains that strongly inspired him, gave way to a new phase of his art, where symbolism and expressionism merge into strongly colored images of landscapes and human beings. During this year Kattinis was invited for a solo show at the Zentrun 107 gallery in Innsbruck and at the Schuhmacher gallery in Munich (Germany). [5] The two exhibitions were extremely successful. Captured by Kattinis’ way of painting, Hans Lang Beton Firm in Innsbruck commissioned him a large, oil painting on plywood [6] On this occasion Professor Heinz von Mackovitz wrote of him “…Kattinis’ colors light up and shine with a brightness full of tension, without becoming violent, so that Kattinis’ painting arouses in the spectators a feeling of perpetual forces...” [7]

=== Italy and Rome ===
When he went back to Italy, Kattinis set up his studio in Trastevere Rome, where, in 1969, the Poliedro gallery invited him for a solo exhibition which was introduced by writings of the famous poets, writers and journalists Leonardo Sinisgalli, Ugo Mannoni, Renato Civello and Giancarlo Fusco. It was an extremely lively time in Rome, one of the European cinema’s most fertile periods, when many artists from all over the world lived and worked in Trastevere and Via Margutta. The American psychologist Giorgina Nathan Burdett got interested in his work and organized an exhibition in her studio. John Hart of the Daily American wrote: “... Kattinis has limitless imagination and prolific technical command, which lets him treat solemn themes with seemingly irreverent levity...” [8]

In 1972 Kattinis was invited at the famous Museum Palazzo Braschi of Rome, for a solo exhibition of his paintings, where the figure of man, fixed out of his temporal significance, becomes a dominant theme of his work.

The art critic Rolando Meconi curated the catalog and the issuing of Kattinis’ first album of handmade linoleum etchings in relief “Vasi Antichi“ [9]

In the following year appeared his beautiful album of 6 handmade linoleum etchings “GLI ASTRONAUTI” edited by IL Poliedro and accompanied by an introduction of Leonardo Sinisgalli [10] and writings of Sandra Giannattasio, Pietro Bianchi, Heinz Von Mackowitz.

In 1977 the Greek government organized a retrospective of his work at the Municipal Theatre (Dimotikò Thèatro) of Piraeus- Athens (Greece), and later on at Kyklos Gallery in Thessaloniki (Greece). Curator: the Greek art critic Eleni Gyzi, with articles on the Greek art magazine Kaleidoscope and Greek newspapers.[11] In Italy he was commissioned an oil painting on iron for one of the twelve doors of the old stadium by the Municipality of Bari and the Greek Embassy of Rome(1997) [12] In 2002 Kattinis was invited by The Municipality of Pisa – for an exhibition entitled ”Cantami o Diva” held in Santacroce in Fossabanda in Pisa and in Montecatini (Italy). [13] In 2003 the ( Magi’ 900) Museo d’Arte delle Generazioni Italiane del 900. G. Bargellini published the catalog “ 4 MAESTRI DELL‘INCISIONE” with the pictures of all Kattinis’ highly skilled etchings and engravings . Nicola Micieli wrote “…what mostly characterizes Kattinis’ scheme of printing, revealing his vision of the world, is his informal method used in combining and manipulating different graphic and chalcographic techniques within the same piece of work...” [14] During the years he has been commissioned exterior and interior large murals and frescoes, among which the three large frescoes inside the suites of “ Le Fabbre – Fattoria Pianetti (Manciano) Italy, inspired by the spirit of the ancient Etruscan civilization [15], together with a beautiful album of 12 multicolor etchings “ Gli Etruschi” [16] One of his works has just appeared within the exhibition entitled “Pittori del ‘900 e Carte da Gioco”, organized by Museo di Roma Palazzo Braschi [17]
