= Geliyan, Kurdistan =

Geliyan گليان
- Village
- Location within Iran
- Coordinates: 35°00′13″N 46°43′03″E
- Country: Iran
- Province: Kurdistan
- County: Kamyaran
- Bakhsh: Central
- Rural District: Zhavehrud

Population (2006)
  - Total: 254
- Time zone: UTC+3:30 (IRST)
  - Summer (DST): UTC+4:30 (IRDT)

Geliyan (Persian: گليان, also Romanized as Gelīyān and Gelyān) is a village in Zhavehrud Rural District, in the Central District of Kamyaran County, Kurdistan Province, Iran. At the 2006 census, its population was 254, in 60 families. The village is populated by Kurds.
