= François Giuliani =

Algerian journalist and publicist

- Born: 5 August 1938; Algiers
- Died: 22 June 2009 (aged 70); Bruges
- Occupations: Journalist, United Nations spokesman, director of public relations

François Giuliani (5 August 1938, Algiers - 22 June 2009, Bruges) was an Algerian-born French journalist and publicist.

Giuliani was born in Algiers. In 1961, he joined the staff of Reuters, working for them as a news correspondent and reporter in both Africa and London for ten years. In 1971, he joined the United Nations Press Section, where he worked for over twenty years. In 1992, he transferred to the United Nations Department of Public Information. In 1996 he left the U.N. to become the Director of Press and Public Relations at the Metropolitan Opera where he served until his retirement in 2006. He died in 2009, in Bruges, at age 70.
