= Bruce L. Gewertz =

American vascular surgeon (born 1949)

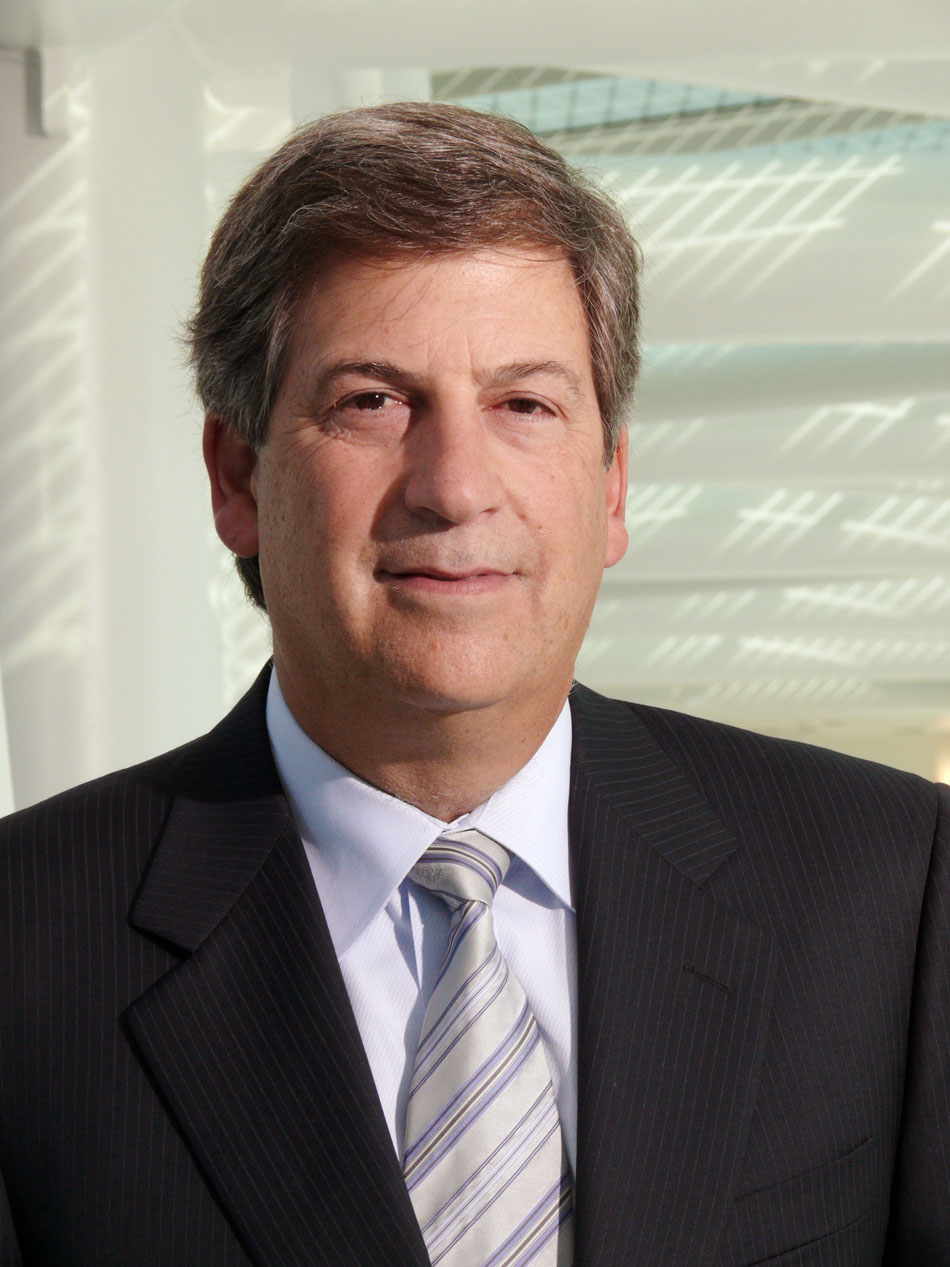
Born August 27, 1949

Bruce Gewertz (born August 27, 1949) is an American vascular surgeon. He holds the position of Surgeon-in-Chief, Chair of the Department of Surgery, Vice-Dean for Academic Affairs and Vice-president for Interventional Services at Cedars-Sinai Health System in Los Angeles. He also holds the Harriet and Steven Nichols Endowed Chair in Surgery.

== Early life and education ==
Dr. Gewertz was born in Philadelphia, Pennsylvania, and was educated at Pennsylvania State University and Jefferson Medical College in the combined BS-MD five-year program. He was selected Outstanding Science Alumnus by Pennsylvania State University in 2003 and Life Fellow by the Alumni Society and University in 2009. Following his graduation from medical school in 1972, Dr. Gewertz trained in general and vascular surgery at the University of Michigan.

== Career ==
From 1977 to 1981, he served on the faculty at Southwestern Medical School in Dallas, Texas. He moved to the University of Chicago in 1981, where he served as chair of the department from 1992 to 2006. His recruitment of outstanding clinicians and surgical scientists to Chicago during that era allowed the department to increase its basic and clinical research funding more than three-fold. Since moving to Cedars-Sinai in 2006, the department has more than doubled in size and increased its ranking in NIH funds from 100th in the country to approximately 20th.

In 1993, he served as script consultant and medical advisor for the film The Fugitive and was included in the film in a small part.
