= Yariabad =

Yariabad (Persian: ياري اباد) may refer to:

- Yariabad, Lorestan
- Yariabad, Qazvin
- Yariabad, alternate name of Aliabad, Dashtabi, Qazvin

== See also ==
- Yarabad (disambiguation)
