= Hajjiabad, Takestan =

Hajjiabad حاجي اباد
- Village
- Location within Iran
- Coordinates: 35°46′44″N 49°30′16″E
- Country: Iran
- Province: Qazvin
- County: Takestan
- Bakhsh: Khorramdasht
- Rural District: Afshariyeh

Population (2006)
  - Total: 207
- Time zone: UTC+3:30 (IRST)
  - Summer (DST): UTC+4:30 (IRDT)

Hajjiabad (Persian: حاجي اباد, also Romanized as Ḩājjīābād and Ḩājīābād) is a village in Afshariyeh Rural District, Khorramdasht District, Takestan County, Qazvin Province, Iran. At the 2006 census, its population was 207, in 62 families.
