= Qazan Daghi =

Qazan Daghi قازان داغي
- Village
- Location within Iran
- Coordinates: 36°07′02″N 49°38′55″E
- Country: Iran
- Province: Qazvin
- County: Takestan
- Bakhsh: Central
- Rural District: Qaqazan-e Sharqi

Population (2006)
  - Total: 63
- Time zone: UTC+3:30 (IRST)
  - Summer (DST): UTC+4:30 (IRDT)

Qazan Daghi (Persian: قازان داغي, also Romanized as Qāzān Dāghī; also known as Qārān Dāghī) is a village in Qaqazan-e Sharqi Rural District, in the Central District of Takestan County, Qazvin Province, Iran. At the 2006 census, its population was 63, in 15 families.
