= Fashalanj =

Fashalanj فشالنج
- Village
- Location within Iran
- Coordinates: 36°19′33″N 49°31′33″E
- Country: Iran
- Province: Qazvin
- County: Takestan
- Bakhsh: Central
- Rural District: Qaqazan-e Gharbi

Population (2006)
  - Total: 126
- Time zone: UTC+3:30 (IRST)
  - Summer (DST): UTC+4:30 (IRDT)

Fashalanj (Persian: فشالنج, also Romanized as Fashālanj and Fashālenj; also known as Fashālaj, Fashalani, and Fīshehlānī) is a village in Qaqazan-e Gharbi Rural District, in the Central District of Takestan County, Qazvin Province, Iran. At the 2006 census, its population was 126, in 35 families.
