= Kushkak, Takestan =

Kushkak كوشكك
- Village
- Location within Iran
- Coordinates: 35°47′28″N 49°35′30″E
- Country: Iran
- Province: Qazvin
- County: Takestan
- Bakhsh: Khorramdasht
- Rural District: Afshariyeh

Population (2006)
  - Total: 223
- Time zone: UTC+3:30 (IRST)
  - Summer (DST): UTC+4:30 (IRDT)

Kushkak (Persian: كوشكك, also Romanized as Kūshkak and Koshkak; also known as Koshkak-e Afshārīyeh) is a village in Afshariyeh Rural District, Khorramdasht District, Takestan County, Qazvin Province, Iran. At the 2006 census, its population was 223, in 59 families.
