= Hamidabad, Takestan =

Hamidabad حميداباد
- Village
- Location within Iran
- Coordinates: 35°53′44″N 49°39′39″E
- Country: Iran
- Province: Qazvin
- County: Takestan
- Bakhsh: Khorramdasht
- Rural District: Afshariyeh

Population (2006)
  - Total: 37
- Time zone: UTC+3:30 (IRST)
  - Summer (DST): UTC+4:30 (IRDT)

Hamidabad (Persian: حميداباد, also Romanized as Ḩamīdābād) is a village in Afshariyeh Rural District, Khorramdasht District, Takestan County, Qazvin Province, Iran. At the 2006 census, its population was 37, in 9 families.
