= Aqcheh Kand, Qazvin =

Aqcheh Kand اقچه كند
- Village
- Location within Iran
- Coordinates: 36°07′53″N 49°39′53″E
- Country: Iran
- Province: Qazvin
- County: Takestan
- Bakhsh: Central
- Rural District: Qaqazan-e Sharqi

Population (2006)
  - Total: 238
- Time zone: UTC+3:30 (IRST)
  - Summer (DST): UTC+4:30 (IRDT)

Aqcheh Kand (Persian: اقچه كند, also Romanized as Āqcheh Kand, Āqcheh Kan, Āqjā Kand, Āqjeh Kand, and Ak-Dzhakand) is a village in Qaqazan-e Sharqi Rural District, in the Central District of Takestan County, Qazvin Province, Iran. At the 2006 census, its population was 238, in 61 families.
