= Meshkin, Qazvin =

Village in Qazvin province, Iran

Meshkin Persian: مشكين
- Village
- Location within Iran
- Coordinates: 36°16′22″N 49°39′04″E
- Country: Iran
- Province: Qazvin
- County: Takestan
- District: Central
- Rural District: Qaqazan-e Gharbi

Population (2016)
  - Total: 408
- Time zone: UTC+3:30 (IRST)

Meshkin (Persian: مشكين) (Note: Also romanized as Meshkīn and Moshkīn; also known as Meshgīn, Moshgīn, and Mushkin) is a village in Qaqazan-e Gharbi Rural District of the Central District in Takestan County, Qazvin province, Iran.

== Demographics ==
=== Population ===
At the time of the 2006 National Census, the village's population was 546 in 140 households. The following census in 2011 counted 534 people in 160 households. The 2016 census measured the population of the village as 408 people in 132 households.
