= Pivand Farms =

Village in Qazvin province, Iran

Pivand Farms Persian: مرغدارئ پيوند
- Village
- Country: Iran
- Province: Qazvin
- County: Takestan
- District: Central
- Rural District: Narjeh

Population (2016)
  - Total: 0
- Time zone: UTC+3:30 (IRST)

Pivand Farms (Persian: مرغدارئ پيوند (Note: Romanized as Marghdāri Pīvand) is a village in Narjeh Rural District of the Central District in Takestan County, Qazvin province, Iran.

== Demographics ==
=== Population ===
At the time of the 2006 National Census, the village's population was 21 in six households. The village did not appear in the following census of 2011. The 2016 census measured the population of the village as zero.
