= Dowlatabad, Qazvin =

Village in Qazvin province, Iran

Dowlatabad Persian: دولت اباد
- Village
- Location within Iran
- Coordinates: 36°11′19″N 49°48′33″E
- Country: Iran
- Province: Qazvin
- County: Takestan
- District: Central
- Rural District: Qaqazan-e Sharqi

Population (2016)
  - Total: 713
- Time zone: UTC+3:30 (IRST)

Dowlatabad (Persian: دولت اباد) (Note: Also romanized as Daulatābād, and Dowlatābād; also known as Daulyatabad) is a village in Qaqazan-e Sharqi Rural District of the Central District in Takestan County, Qazvin province, Iran.

== Demographics ==
=== Population ===
At the time of the 2006 National Census, the village's population was 827 in 190 households. The following census in 2011 counted 666 people in 193 households. The 2016 census measured the population of the village as 713 people in 204 households.
