= Karadash =

Karadash may refer to:

- Karadash, Turkmenistan
- Sevkar, Armenia - formerly Karadash
- Qaradaş, Azerbaijan
- Qarah Dash (disambiguation)
