= Ashtajin =

Village in Qazvin province, Iran

Ashtajin Persian: اشتجين
- Village
- Location within Iran
- Coordinates: 36°14′00″N 49°45′42″E
- Country: Iran
- Province: Qazvin
- County: Takestan
- District: Central
- Rural District: Qaqazan-e Sharqi

Population (2016)
  - Total: 517
- Time zone: UTC+3:30 (IRST)

Ashtajin (Persian: اشتجين) (Note: Also romanized as Ashtajīn and Āshtajīn; also known as Ashtāchīn, Ashtagin, and Ashtākīn) is a village in Qaqazan-e Sharqi Rural District of the Central District in Takestan County, Qazvin province, Iran.

== Demographics ==
=== Population ===
At the time of the 2006 National Census, the village's population was 456 in 101 households. The following census in 2011 counted 376 people in 117 households. The 2016 census measured the population of the village as 517 people in 161 households.
