= Daghlan =

Village in Qazvin province, Iran

Daghlan Persian: داغلان
- Village
- Location within Iran
- Coordinates: 36°14′55″N 49°47′16″E
- Country: Iran
- Province: Qazvin
- County: Takestan
- District: Central
- Rural District: Qaqazan-e Sharqi

Population (2016)
  - Total: 1,496
- Time zone: UTC+3:30 (IRST)

Daghlan (Persian: داغلان) (Note: Also romanized as Dāghlān; also known as Daglan and Dāqlān) is a village in Qaqazan-e Sharqi Rural District of the Central District in Takestan County, Qazvin province, Iran.

== Demographics ==
=== Ethnicity ===
The village is populated by Azerbaijani Turks.

=== Population ===
At the time of the 2006 National Census, the village's population was 1,224 in 290 households. The following census in 2011 counted 1,267 people in 378 households. The 2016 census measured the population of the village as 1,496 people in 449 households.
