= Changureh, Takestan =

Changureh چنگوره
- Village
- Location within Iran
- Coordinates: 36°13′03″N 49°31′14″E
- Country: Iran
- Province: Qazvin
- County: Takestan
- Bakhsh: Central
- Rural District: Qaqazan-e Gharbi

Population (2006)
  - Total: 94
- Time zone: UTC+3:30 (IRST)
  - Summer (DST): UTC+4:30 (IRDT)

Changureh (Persian: چنگوره, also Romanized as Changūreh, Changoreh, Changurah, and Changurakh) is a village in Qaqazan-e Gharbi Rural District, in the Central District of Takestan County, Qazvin Province, Iran. At the 2006 census, its population was 94, in 24 families. The people of this village are Azerbaijani Turks and speak the Azerbaijani language.
