= Nikuyeh =

Village in Qazvin province, Iran

Nikuyeh Persian: نيكويه
- Village
- Location within Iran
- Coordinates: 36°17′29″N 49°33′33″E
- Country: Iran
- Province: Qazvin
- County: Takestan
- District: Central
- Rural District: Qaqazan-e Gharbi

Population (2016)
  - Total: 775
- Time zone: UTC+3:30 (IRST)

Nikuyeh (Persian: نيكويه) (Note: Also romanized as Nīkūyeh; also known as Naki, Nekū’yā, and Nikuya) is a village in, and the capital of, Qaqazan-e Gharbi Rural District in the Central District of Takestan County, Qazvin province, Iran.

== Demographics ==
=== Population ===
At the time of the 2006 National Census, the village's population was 1,351 in 329 households. The following census in 2011 counted 1,174 people in 349 households. The 2016 census measured the population of the village as 775 people in 243 households.
