= Shenasvand =

Village in Qazvin province, Iran

Shenasvand Persian: شناسوند
- Village
- Location within Iran
- Coordinates: 36°13′45″N 49°26′11″E
- Country: Iran
- Province: Qazvin
- County: Takestan
- District: Central
- Rural District: Qaqazan-e Gharbi

Population (2016)
  - Total: 105
- Time zone: UTC+3:30 (IRST)

Shenasvand (Persian: شناسوند) (Note: Also romanized as Shenāsvand; also known as Chanasband, Chanāsvand, Chenasband, Chenāsvand, Chinasband, Shanāsfand, Shenāsband, and Shenāsfand) is a village in Qaqazan-e Gharbi Rural District of the Central District in Takestan County, Qazvin province, Iran.

== Demographics ==
=== Population ===
At the time of the 2006 National Census, the village's population was 132 in 27 households. The following census in 2011 counted 103 people in 25 households. The 2016 census measured the population of the village as 105 people in 30 households.
