= Yazdeh Rud =

Village in Qazvin province, Iran

Yazdeh Rud Persian: يزده رود
- Village
- Location within Iran
- Coordinates: 36°16′58″N 49°37′15″E
- Country: Iran
- Province: Qazvin
- County: Takestan
- District: Central
- Rural District: Qaqazan-e Gharbi

Population (2016)
  - Total: 105
- Time zone: UTC+3:30 (IRST)

Yazdeh Rud (Persian: يزده رود) (Note: Also romanized as Yazdeh Rūd and Yezdehrūd; also known as Yazdakhrud and Yazdrūd) is a village in Qaqazan-e Gharbi Rural District of the Central District in Takestan County, Qazvin province, Iran.

== Demographics ==
=== Population ===
At the time of the 2006 National Census, the village's population was 170 in 50 households. The following census in 2011 counted 120 people in 36 households. The 2016 census measured the population of the village as 105 people in 32 households.
