= Qalat, Qazvin =

Village in Qazvin province, Iran

Qalat Persian: قلات
- Village
- Location within Iran
- Coordinates: 36°15′13″N 49°30′46″E
- Country: Iran
- Province: Qazvin
- County: Takestan
- District: Central
- Rural District: Qaqazan-e Gharbi

Population (2016)
  - Total: 344
- Time zone: UTC+3:30 (IRST)

Qalat (Persian: قلات) (Note: Also romanized as Qalāt; also known as Kalat) is a village in Qaqazan-e Gharbi Rural District of the Central District in Takestan County, Qazvin province, Iran.

== Demographics ==
=== Population ===
At the time of the 2006 National Census, the village's population was 576 in 153 households. The following census in 2011 counted 518 people in 165 households. The 2016 census measured the population of the village as 344 people in 113 households.
