= Owrazjin =

Village in Qazvin province, Iran

Owrazjin Persian: اورازجين
- Village
- Location within Iran
- Coordinates: 35°51′33″N 49°36′49″E
- Country: Iran
- Province: Qazvin
- County: Takestan
- District: Khorramdasht
- Rural District: Afshariyeh

Population (2016)
  - Total: 1,244
- Time zone: UTC+3:30 (IRST)

Owrazjin (Persian: اورازجين) (Note: Also known as Orazjin and Orāzjīn) is a village in Afshariyeh Rural District of Khorramdasht District in Takestan County, Qazvin province, Iran.

== Demographics ==
=== Population ===
At the time of the 2006 National Census, the village's population was 1,012 in 225 households. The following census in 2011 counted 974 people in 292 households. The 2016 census measured the population of the village as 1,244 people in 377 households. It was the most populous village in its rural district.
