= Shirazak =

Village in Qazvin province, Iran

Shirazak Persian: شيرازك
- Village
- Location within Iran
- Coordinates: 36°15′10″N 49°41′38″E
- Country: Iran
- Province: Qazvin
- County: Takestan
- District: Central
- Rural District: Qaqazan-e Sharqi

Population (2016)
  - Total: 574
- Time zone: UTC+3:30 (IRST)

Shirazak (Persian: شيرازك) (Note: Also romanized as Shīrāzak; also known as Sharazak) is a village in Qaqazan-e Sharqi Rural District of the Central District in Takestan County, Qazvin province, Iran.

== Demographics ==
=== Population ===
At the time of the 2006 National Census, the village's population was 705 in 194 households. The following census in 2011 counted 480 people in 146 households. The 2016 census measured the population of the village as 574 people in 181 households.
