= Tarvizak =

Village in Qazvin province, Iran

Tarvizak Persian: طرويزك
- Village
- Location within Iran
- Coordinates: 35°51′50″N 49°36′21″E
- Country: Iran
- Province: Qazvin
- County: Takestan
- District: Khorramdasht
- Rural District: Afshariyeh

Population (2016)
  - Total: 1,019
- Time zone: UTC+3:30 (IRST)

Tarvizak (Persian: طرويزك) (Note: Also romanized as Ţarvīzak; also known as Tabrīzak) is a village in Afshariyeh Rural District of Khorramdasht District in Takestan County, Qazvin province, Iran.

== Demographics ==
=== Population ===
At the time of the 2006 National Census, the village's population was 994 in 267 households. The following census in 2011 counted 987 people in 288 households. The 2016 census measured the population of the village as 1,019 people in 311 households.
