= Jafarabad, Qazvin =

Village in Qazvin province, Iran

Jafarabad Persian: جعفراباد
- Village
- Location within Iran
- Coordinates: 35°51′10″N 49°37′20″E
- Country: Iran
- Province: Qazvin
- County: Takestan
- District: Khorramdasht
- Rural District: Afshariyeh

Population (2016)
  - Total: 753
- Time zone: UTC+3:30 (IRST)

Jafarabad (Persian: جعفراباد) (Note: Also romanized as Ja‘farābād) is a village in Afshariyeh Rural District of Khorramdasht District in Takestan County, Qazvin province, Iran.

== Demographics ==
=== Population ===
At the time of the 2006 National Census, the village's population was 732 in 182 households. The following census in 2011 counted 780 people in 199 households. The 2016 census measured the population of the village as 753 people in 218 households.
