= Barzaljin =

Village in Qazvin province, Iran

Barzaljin Persian: برزلجين
- Village
- Location within Iran
- Coordinates: 35°44′53″N 49°33′46″E
- Country: Iran
- Province: Qazvin
- County: Takestan
- District: Khorramdasht
- Rural District: Afshariyeh

Population (2016)
  - Total: 896
- Time zone: UTC+3:30 (IRST)

Barzaljin (Persian: برزلجين) (Note: Also Romanized as Barzaljīn, Borzaljin, Borzelajīn, and Borzolajīn; also known as Būraz Lājīn, Būrzolājīn, and Būrzūlājīn) is a village in Afshariyeh Rural District of Khorramdasht District in Takestan County, Qazvin province, Iran.

== Demographics ==
=== Population ===
At the time of the 2006 National Census, the village's population was 1,054 in 297 households. The following census in 2011 counted 885 people in 273 households. The 2016 census measured the population of the village as 896 people in 311 households.
