= Rahimabad, Takestan =

Village in Qazvin province, Iran

Rahimabad Persian: رحيم اباد
- Village
- Location within Iran
- Coordinates: 35°52′10″N 49°32′08″E
- Country: Iran
- Province: Qazvin
- County: Takestan
- District: Khorramdasht
- Rural District: Afshariyeh

Population (2016)
  - Total: 445
- Time zone: UTC+3:30 (IRST)

Rahimabad (Persian: رحيم اباد) (Note: Also romanized as Raḩīmābād) is a village in, and the capital of, Afshariyeh Rural District in Khorramdasht District of Takestan County, Qazvin province, Iran.

== Demographics ==
=== Population ===
At the time of the 2006 National Census, the village's population was 528 in 142 households. The following census in 2011 counted 563 people in 155 households. The 2016 census measured the population of the village as 445 people in 153 households.
