= Shanastaq =

Shanastaq or Shanestaq or Shanstaq (Persian: شنستق) may refer to:

- Shanastaq-e Olya
- Shanastaq-e Sofla
