= Shahrsanati-ye Takestan =

Village in Qazvin province, Iran

Shahrsanati-ye Takestan Persian: شهرصنعتي تاكستان
- Village
- Location within Iran
- Coordinates: 36°01′40″N 49°37′52″E
- Country: Iran
- Province: Qazvin
- County: Takestan
- District: Central
- Rural District: Narjeh

Population (2016)
  - Total: Below reporting threshold
- Time zone: UTC+3:30 (IRST)

Shahrsanati-ye Takestan (Persian: شهرصنعتي تاكستان) (Note: Also romanized as Shahrṣanʿatī-ye Tāḵestān; English: Takestan Industrial City) is a village in Narjeh Rural District of the Central District in Takestan County, Qazvin province, Iran.

== Demographics ==
=== Population ===
At the time of the 2006 National Census, the village's population was 30 in 12 households. The following census in 2011 counted 26 people in nine households. The 2016 census measured the population of the village as below the reporting threshold.
