= Qarah Dash, Qazvin =

Qarah Dash قره داش
- Village
- Location within Iran
- Coordinates: 36°09′21″N 49°36′03″E
- Country: Iran
- Province: Qazvin
- County: Takestan
- Bakhsh: Central
- Rural District: Qaqazan-e Sharqi

Population (2006)
  - Total: 34
- Time zone: UTC+3:30 (IRST)
  - Summer (DST): UTC+4:30 (IRDT)

Qarah Dash (Persian: قره داش, also Romanized as Qarah Dāsh, Qareh Dāsh, Karadash, and Qārādāsh; also known as Qal‘eh Qarah Dast and Qal‘eh-ye Qareh Dāsh) is a village in Qaqazan-e Sharqi Rural District, in the Central District of Takestan County, Qazvin Province, Iran. At the 2006 census, its population was 34, in 9 families.
