= Sinak, Qazvin =

Village in Qazvin province, Iran

Sinak Persian: سينك
- Village
- Location within Iran
- Coordinates: 35°44′22″N 49°29′32″E
- Country: Iran
- Province: Qazvin
- County: Takestan
- District: Khorramdasht
- Rural District: Afshariyeh

Population (2016)
  - Total: 266
- Time zone: UTC+3:30 (IRST)

Sinak (Persian: سينك) (Note: Also romanized as Sīnak; also known as Senak) is a village in Afshariyeh Rural District of Khorramdasht District in Takestan County, Qazvin province, Iran.

== Demographics ==
=== Population ===
At the time of the 2006 National Census, the village's population was 419 in 100 households. The following census in 2011 counted 358 people in 104 households. The 2016 census measured the population of the village as 266 people in 87 households.
