= Khvorhesht =

Village in Qazvin province, Iran

Khvorhesht Persian: خورهشت
- Village
- Location within Iran
- Coordinates: 36°12′18″N 49°41′14″E
- Country: Iran
- Province: Qazvin
- County: Takestan
- District: Central
- Rural District: Qaqazan-e Sharqi

Population (2016)
  - Total: 2,144
- Time zone: UTC+3:30 (IRST)

Khvorhesht (Persian: خورهشت) (Note: Also romanized as Khorhasht, Khūrhasht, and Khūrhesht; also known as Khuresh) is a village in Qaqazan-e Sharqi Rural District of the Central District in Takestan County, Qazvin province, Iran.

== Demographics ==
=== Population ===
At the time of the 2006 National Census, the village's population was 1,757 in 387 households. The following census in 2011 counted 1,925 people in 580 households. The 2016 census measured the population of the village as 2,144 people in 657 households.
