= Kashmarz =

Village in Qazvin province, Iran

Kashmarz Persian: كشمرز
- Village
- Location within Iran
- Coordinates: 35°45′24″N 49°31′16″E
- Country: Iran
- Province: Qazvin
- County: Takestan
- District: Khorramdasht
- Rural District: Afshariyeh

Population (2016)
  - Total: 340
- Time zone: UTC+3:30 (IRST)

Kashmarz (Persian: كشمرز) (Note: Also romanized as Keshmarz; also known as Kacha Marz and Kashmarz-e Afshārīyeh) is a village in Afshariyeh Rural District of Khorramdasht District in Takestan County, Qazvin province, Iran.

== Demographics ==
=== Ethnicity ===
The village is populated by Azerbaijani Turks.

=== Population ===
At the time of the 2006 National Census, the village's population was 393 in 86 households. The following census in 2011 counted 374 people in 116 households. The 2016 census measured the population of the village as 340 people in 114 households.
