= Mehdiabad, Qazvin =

Village in Qazvin province, Iran

Mehdiabad Persian: دولت اباد
- Village
- Location within Iran
- Coordinates: 36°11′54″N 49°42′32″E
- Country: Iran
- Province: Qazvin
- County: Takestan
- District: Central
- Rural District: Qaqazan-e Sharqi

Population (2016)
  - Total: 513
- Time zone: UTC+3:30 (IRST)

Mehdiabad (Persian: مهدي اباد) (Note: Also romanized as Mehdīābād; also known as Mekhdiabad and Mihdiābād) is a village in Qaqazan-e Sharqi Rural District of the Central District in Takestan County, Qazvin province, Iran.

== Demographics ==
=== Population ===
At the time of the 2006 National Census, the village's population was 758 in 157 households. The following census in 2011 counted 814 people in 184 households. The 2016 census measured the population of the village as 513 people in 163 households.
