= Yarabad =

Yarabad (Persian: يارآباد) may refer to:

- Yarabad, Kakavand, Lorestan Province
- Yarabad Mirbeyg
- Yarabad-e Olya, Ilam Province

== See also ==
- Yariabad (disambiguation)
