= Takand =

Village in Qazvin province, Iran

Takand Persian: تاكند
- Village
- Location within Iran
- Coordinates: 36°12′19″N 49°33′10″E
- Country: Iran
- Province: Qazvin
- County: Takestan
- District: Central
- Rural District: Qaqazan-e Gharbi

Population (2016)
  - Total: 166
- Time zone: UTC+3:30 (IRST)

Takand (Persian: تاكند) (Note: Also romanized as Tākand; also known as Mākant, Tahkan, Tahkant, and Takhkant) is a village in Qaqazan-e Gharbi Rural District of the Central District in Takestan County, Qazvin province, Iran.

== Demographics ==
=== Population ===
At the time of the 2006 National Census, the village's population was 370 in 115 households. The following census in 2011 counted 227 people in 85 households. The 2016 census measured the population of the village as 166 people in 69 households.
