= Yariabad, Qazvin =

Yariabad ياري اباد
- Village
- Location within Iran
- Coordinates: 35°53′01″N 49°40′08″E
- Country: Iran
- Province: Qazvin
- County: Takestan
- Bakhsh: Khorramdasht
- Rural District: Afshariyeh

Population (2006)
  - Total: 190
- Time zone: UTC+3:30 (IRST)
  - Summer (DST): UTC+4:30 (IRDT)

Yariabad (Persian: ياري اباد, also Romanized as Yārīābād) is a village in Afshariyeh Rural District, Khorramdasht District, Takestan County, Qazvin Province, Iran. At the 2006 census, its population was 190, in 57 families.
