= Shizand =

Village in Qazvin province, Iran

Shizand Persian: شيزند
- Village
- Location within Iran
- Coordinates: 35°44′10″N 49°31′30″E
- Country: Iran
- Province: Qazvin
- County: Takestan
- District: Khorramdasht
- Rural District: Afshariyeh

Population (2016)
  - Total: 866
- Time zone: UTC+3:30 (IRST)

Shizand (Persian: شيزند) (Note: Also romanized as Shīzand) is a village in Afshariyeh Rural District of Khorramdasht District in Takestan County, Qazvin province, Iran.

== Demographics ==
=== Population ===
At the time of the 2006 National Census, the village's population was 1,076 in 293 households. The following census in 2011 counted 1,137 people in 346 households. The 2016 census measured the population of the village as 866 people in 305 households.
