= Aqcheh Kand =

Aqcheh Kand (Persian: اقچه كند) may refer to:

- Aqcheh Kand, Ardabil
- Aqcheh Kand, East Azerbaijan
- Aqcheh Kand, Qazvin
- Aqcheh Kand, Zanjan
- Aqcheh Kand, Khodabandeh, Zanjan Province
