= Qarah Bagh, Qazvin =

Village in Qazvin province, Iran

Qarah Bagh Persian: قره باغ
- Village
- Location within Iran
- Coordinates: 36°03′16″N 49°35′24″E
- Country: Iran
- Province: Qazvin
- County: Takestan
- District: Central
- Rural District: Narjeh

Population (2016)
  - Total: 332
- Time zone: UTC+3:30 (IRST)

Qarah Bagh (Persian: قره باغ) (Note: Also known as Karabagi, Qarabāgh, Qarah Bāghī, and Qareh Bāghī) is a village in Narjeh Rural District of the Central District in Takestan County, Qazvin province, Iran.

== Demographics ==
=== Population ===
At the time of the 2006 National Census, the village's population was 372 in 103 households. The following census in 2011 counted 379 people in 114 households. The 2016 census measured the population of the village as 332 people in 106 households. It was the most populous village in its rural district.
