= Dastjerd, Qazvin =

Village in Qazvin province, Iran

Dastjerd Persian: دستجرد
- Village
- Location within Iran
- Coordinates: 36°15′17″N 49°45′33″E
- Country: Iran
- Province: Qazvin
- County: Takestan
- District: Central
- Rural District: Qaqazan-e Sharqi

Population (2016)
  - Total: 611
- Time zone: UTC+3:30 (IRST)

Dastjerd (Persian: دستجرد) (Note: Also known as Dashtgird and Dastgerd) is a village in Qaqazan-e Sharqi Rural District of the Central District in Takestan County, Qazvin province, Iran.

== Demographics ==
=== Population ===
At the time of the 2006 National Census, the village's population was 741 in 193 households. The following census in 2011 counted 642 people in 173 households. The 2016 census measured the population of the village as 611 people in 195 households.
