= Now Dehak =

Now Dehak (Persian: نودهك) may refer to:

- Now Dehak, Babol, Mazandaran Province
- Now Dehak, Neka, Mazandaran Province
- Now Dehak, Qazvin
