= Andaq =

Village in Qazvin province, Iran

Andaq Persian: انداق
- Village
- Location within Iran
- Coordinates: 36°15′20″N 49°38′35″E
- Country: Iran
- Province: Qazvin
- County: Takestan
- District: Central
- Rural District: Qaqazan-e Gharbi

Population (2016)
  - Total: 611
- Time zone: UTC+3:30 (IRST)

Andaq (Persian: انداق) (Note: Also romanized as Andāq; also known as Andak and Andākh) is a village in Qaqazan-e Gharbi Rural District of the Central District in Takestan County, Qazvin province, Iran.

== Demographics ==
=== Population ===
At the time of the 2006 National Census, the village's population was 1,024 in 242 households. The following census in 2011 counted 776 people in 230 households. The 2016 census measured the population of the village as 611 people in 191 households.
