= Saras, Iran =

Village in Qazvin province, Iran

Saras Persian: سراس
- Village
- Location within Iran
- Coordinates: 36°15′43″N 49°26′21″E
- Country: Iran
- Province: Qazvin
- County: Takestan
- District: Central
- Rural District: Qaqazan-e Gharbi

Population (2016)
  - Total: 182
- Time zone: UTC+3:30 (IRST)

Saras (Persian: سراس) (Note: Also romanized as Sarās; also known as Sarask and Sarāsq) is a village in Qaqazan-e Gharbi Rural District of the Central District in Takestan County, Qazvin province, Iran.

== Demographics ==
=== Population ===
At the 2006 National Census, the village's population was 300 in 70 households. The following census (2011) recorded 245 people in 73 households, while the 2016 census recorded 182 people in 56 households.
