= Darbahan =

Village in Qazvin province, Iran

Darbahan Persian: دربهان
- Village
- Location within Iran
- Coordinates: 36°17′16″N 49°28′57″E
- Country: Iran
- Province: Qazvin
- County: Takestan
- District: Central
- Rural District: Qaqazan-e Gharbi

Population (2016)
  - Total: 305
- Time zone: UTC+3:30 (IRST)

Darbahan (Persian: دربهان) (Note: Also romanized as Darbahān; also known as Darbakhan) is a village in Qaqazan-e Gharbi Rural District of the Central District in Takestan County, Qazvin province, Iran.

== Demographics ==
=== Population ===
At the time of the 2006 National Census, the village's population was 513 in 130 households. The following census in 2011 counted 392 people in 124 households. The 2016 census measured the population of the village as 305 people in 96 households.
