= Qomik-e Bozorg =

Village in Qazvin province, Iran

Qomik-e Bozorg Persian: قميك بزرگ
- Village
- Location within Iran
- Coordinates: 36°10′45″N 49°46′40″E
- Country: Iran
- Province: Qazvin
- County: Takestan
- District: Central
- Rural District: Qaqazan-e Sharqi

Population (2016)
  - Total: 1,003
- Time zone: UTC+3:30 (IRST)

Qomik-e Bozorg (Persian: قميك بزرگ) (Note: Also romanized as Qomīk-e Bozorg; also known as Qomīk and Qom Yek) is a village in Qaqazan-e Sharqi Rural District of the Central District in Takestan County, Qazvin province, Iran.

== Demographics ==
=== Population ===
At the time of the 2006 National Census, the village's population was 1,097 in 243 households. The following census in 2011 counted 1,221 people in 329 households. The 2016 census measured the population of the village as 1,003 people in 302 households.
