= Yahyaabad, Qazvin =

Village in Qazvin province, Iran

Yahyaabad Persian: يحيي اباد
- Village
- Location within Iran
- Coordinates: 36°12′48″N 49°46′12″E
- Country: Iran
- Province: Qazvin
- County: Takestan
- District: Central
- Rural District: Qaqazan-e Sharqi

Population (2016)
  - Total: 3,060
- Time zone: UTC+3:30 (IRST)

Yahyaabad (Persian: يحيي اباد) (Note: Also romanized as Yaḩyáābād; also known as Yahyābād and Yakhyyabad) is a village in, and the capital of, Qaqazan-e Sharqi Rural District in the Central District of Takestan County, Qazvin province, Iran.

== Demographics ==
=== Population ===
At the time of the 2006 National Census, the village's population was 2,857 in 565 households. The following census in 2011 counted 2,582 people in 672 households. The 2016 census measured the population of the village as 3,060 people in 871 households. It was the most populous village in its rural district.
