= Aq Bolagh, Qazvin =

Aq Bolagh اقبلاغ
- Village
- Location within Iran
- Coordinates: 36°13′11″N 49°34′24″E
- Country: Iran
- Province: Qazvin
- County: Takestan
- Bakhsh: Central
- Rural District: Qaqazan-e Gharbi

Population (2006)
  - Total: 173
- Time zone: UTC+3:30 (IRST)
  - Summer (DST): UTC+4:30 (IRDT)

Aq Bolagh (Persian: اقبلاغ, also Romanized as Āq Bolāgh, Ak-Bulak, Āq Būlāgh, and Āqbulāq) is a village in Qaqazan-e Gharbi Rural District, in the Central District of Takestan County, Qazvin Province, Iran. At the 2006 census, its population was 173, in 51 families.
