= Qarah Dash =

Qarah Dash or Qareh Dash (Persian: قره داش) may refer to:

- Qarah Dash, East Azerbaijan
- Qarah Dash, Markazi
- Qarah Dash, Qazvin
- Qarah Dash, Razavi Khorasan
- Qarah Dash, West Azerbaijan
- Qarah Dash, Zanjan
- Qarah Dash Parchik
