= Shenin =

Shenin may refer to:

- Communist Party of the Soviet Union (Shenin)
- Shanin, a village in Iran
- Shenin Qaqazan, a village in Iran
