= Shanastaq-e Olya =

Village in Qazvin province, Iran

Shanastaq-e Olya Persian: شنستق عليا
- Village
- Location within Iran
- Coordinates: 35°43′01″N 49°37′39″E
- Country: Iran
- Province: Qazvin
- County: Takestan
- District: Khorramdasht
- Rural District: Afshariyeh

Population (2016)
  - Total: 344
- Time zone: UTC+3:30 (IRST)

Shanastaq-e Olya (Persian: شنستق عليا) (Note: Also romanized as Shanastaq-e ‘Olyā and Shanstaq-e ‘Olyā; also known as Shanastagh Olya, Shanastaq-e Bālā, Shanestaq, Shanstaq ‘Ūlīya, and Shenastāq-e Bālā) is a village in Afshariyeh Rural District of Khorramdasht District in Takestan County, Qazvin province, Iran.

== Demographics ==
=== Population ===
At the time of the 2006 National Census, the village's population was 769 in 176 households. The following census in 2011 counted 549 people in 154 households. The 2016 census measured the population of the village as 344 people in 124 households.
