= Shenin Qaqazan =

Village in Qazvin province, Iran

Shenin Qaqazan Persian: شنين قاقازان
- Village
- Location within Iran
- Coordinates: 36°05′09″N 49°36′23″E
- Country: Iran
- Province: Qazvin
- County: Takestan
- District: Central
- Rural District: Narjeh

Population (2016)
  - Total: 66
- Time zone: UTC+3:30 (IRST)

Shenin Qaqazan (Persian: شنين قاقازان) (Note: Also romanized as Shenīn Qāqāzān; also known as Shanin Ghaghzan Sharghi, Shenīn, and Shenīn Qāqzān) is a village in Narjeh Rural District of the Central District in Takestan County, Qazvin province, Iran.

== Demographics ==
=== Population ===
At the time of the 2006 National Census, the village's population was 80 in 20 households. The following census in 2011 counted 63 people in 17 households. The 2016 census measured the population of the village as 66 people in 19 households.
