= Now Dehak, Qazvin =

Village in Qazvin province, Iran

Now Dehak Persian: نودهك
- Village
- Location within Iran
- Coordinates: 35°58′03″N 49°36′09″E
- Country: Iran
- Province: Qazvin
- County: Takestan
- District: Central
- Rural District: Narjeh

Population (2016)
  - Total: 134
- Time zone: UTC+3:30 (IRST)

Now Dehak (Persian: نودهك) (Note: Also known as Naudeh, Now Deh, and Nūda) is a village in Narjeh Rural District of the Central District in Takestan County, Qazvin province, Iran.

== Demographics ==
=== Population ===
At the time of the 2006 National Census, the village's population was 196 in 54 households. The following census in 2011 counted 152 people in 53 households. The 2016 census measured the population of the village as 134 people in 51 households.
