= Changureh =

Changureh or Changurah or Changoreh and Changurakh (Persian: چنگوره) may refer to:

- Changureh, Avaj
- Changureh, Takestan
