= Shanastaq-e Sofla =

Village in Qazvin province, Iran

Shanastaq-e Sofla Persian: شنستق سفلي
- Village
- Location within Iran
- Coordinates: 35°43′18″N 49°35′52″E
- Country: Iran
- Province: Qazvin
- County: Takestan
- District: Khorramdasht
- Rural District: Afshariyeh

Population (2016)
  - Total: 296
- Time zone: UTC+3:30 (IRST)

Shanastaq-e Sofla (Persian: شنستق سفلي) (Note: Also romanized as Shanastaq-e Soflá and Shanstaq-e Soflá; also known as Shanastagh Sofla, Shanastaq-e Pā‘īn, and Shanstaq Sufla) is a village in Afshariyeh Rural District of Khorramdasht District in Takestan County, Qazvin province, Iran.

== Demographics ==
=== Population ===
At the time of the 2006 National Census, the village's population was 464 in 117 households. The following census in 2011 counted 380 people in 117 households. The 2016 census measured the population of the village as 296 people in 103 households.
