= Kishkin =

Kishkin can refer to

- Kaneshkin a village in Iran
- Nikolai Kishkin, (1864-1930) Russian politician
