= The Road to Oxiana =

1937 travelogue by Robert Byron

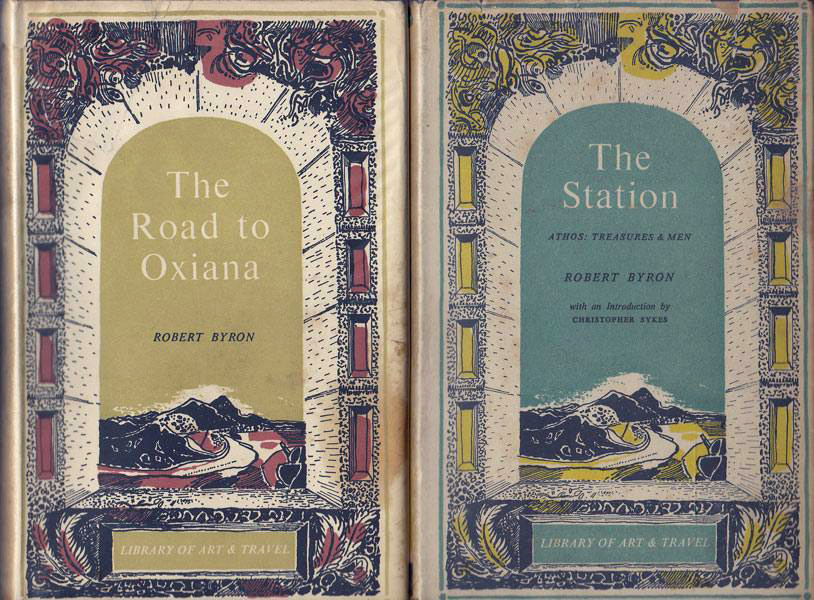
- Covers of The Road to Oxiana and The Station, published by John Lehmann. Second English editions 1949–1950, London, 1949
- Author: Robert Byron
- Publication date: 1937

The Road to Oxiana is a travelogue by the explorer Robert Byron, first published in 1937. It documents Byron's travels around Persia and Afghanistan, and is considered one of the most influential travel books of the 1930s. The word "Oxiana" in the title refers to the ancient name for the region along Afghanistan's northern border.

== Plot ==
The book is an account of Byron's ten-month journey in the Middle East, Afghanistan and India in 1933–34, partially in the company of Christopher Sykes. It is in the form of a diary with the first entry "Venice, 20 August 1933" after which Byron travelled by ship to the island of Cyprus and then on to the countries of Palestine, Syria, Iraq, Iran and Afghanistan. The journey ended in Peshawar, India (now part of Pakistan) on 19 June 1934, from where he returned to England.

The primary purpose of the journey was to visit the region's architectural treasures of which Byron had extensive knowledge, as evidenced by his observations along the way. For example, he says of the Mosque of Sheikh Lutfullah, now listed as a World Heritage Site by UNESCO:

I have never encountered splendour of this kind before. Other interiors came into my mind as I stood there, to compare it with: Versailles, or the porcelain rooms at Schönbrunn, or the Doge's Palace, or St Peter's. All are rich; but none so rich. Their richness is three-dimensional; it is attended by all the effort of shadow. In the Mosque of Sheikh Lutfullah, it is a richness of light and surface, of pattern and colour only. The architectural form is unimportant. It is not smothered, as in rococo; it is simply the instrument of a spectacle, as earth is the instrument of a garden. And then I suddenly thought of that unfortunate species, modern interior decorators, who imagine they can make a restaurant, or a cinema, or a plutocrat's drawing-room look rich if given money enough for gold leaf and looking-glass. They little know what amateurs they are. Nor, alas, do their clients.

Byron interacted with the locals and negotiated transport, including motor vehicles, horses and asses to carry him on his journey. He encountered heat, cold, hunger and thirst and suffered the inconvenience of bugs, fleas, lice and physical illness.

== List of places visited in The Road to Oxiana ==
Robert Byron's journey in this book starts with the first entry on 20 August 1933 and ends on 8 July 1934. The following are the places that have entries in the book (NB spellings used by the author sometimes differ from contemporary usage):

- Venice
- SS Italia
- Kyrenia
- Nicosia
- Famagusta
- Larnaca
- SS Martha Washington
- Jerusalem
- Damascus
- Beirut
- Baghdad
- Kirmanshah
- Teheran
- Gulhek
- Zinjan
- Tabriz
- Maragha
- Tasr Kand
- Saoma
- Kala Julk
- Ak Bulagh
- Ayn Varzan
- Shahrud
- Nishapur
- Meshed
- Herat
- Karokh
- Kala Nao
- Laman
- Qom
- Delijan
- Isfahan
- Abadeh
- Shiraz
- Kavar
- Firuzabad
- Ibrahimabad
- Kazerun
- Persepolis
- Yezd
- Bahramabad
- Kirman
- Mahun
- Sultaniya
- Shahi
- Asterabad
- Gumbad-i-kabus
- Bandar Shah
- Samnan
- Damghan
- Abbasabad
- Kariz
- Moghor
- Bala Murghab
- Maimena
- Andkhoi
- Mazar-i-Sharif
- Robat
- Khan Abad
- Bamian
- Shibar
- Charikar
- Kabul
- Ghazni
- Peshawar

== Reception and reviews ==
The writer Paul Fussell wrote that The Road to Oxiana is to the travel book what "Ulysses is to the novel between the wars, and what The Waste Land is to poetry."

The travel writer Bruce Chatwin in his introduction to the book has described it as "a sacred text, beyond criticism," and carried his copy since he was fifteen years old, "spineless and floodstained" after four journeys through Central Asia.

C. H. Sykes described this book as "an inquiry into the origins of Islamic art presented in the form of one of the most entertaining travel books of modern times" and added that it was "written with such charm and gaiety that most contemporary readers did not recognize it as a serious and original contribution to Islamic studies".
