= Kaneshkin =

Village in Qazvin province, Iran

Kaneshkin Persian: كنشكين
- Village
- Location within Iran
- Coordinates: 36°14′40″N 49°35′01″E
- Country: Iran
- Province: Qazvin
- County: Takestan
- District: Central
- Rural District: Qaqazan-e Gharbi

Population (2016)
  - Total: 976
- Time zone: UTC+3:30 (IRST)

Kaneshkin (Persian: كنشكين) (Note: Also romanized as Kaneshkīn; also known as Kaneshgīn, Kanishkīn, Kashgīn, Kereshkin, and Kīshkīn) is a village in Qaqazan-e Gharbi Rural District of the Central District in Takestan County, Qazvin province, Iran.

== Demographics ==
=== Population ===
At the time of the 2006 National Census, the village's population was 1,705 in 387 households. The following census in 2011 counted 1,444 people in 413 households. The 2016 census measured the population of the village as 976 people in 299 households. It was the most populous village in its rural district.
