= Narjeh =

City in Qazvin province, Iran

Narjeh Persian: نرجه
- City
- Location within Iran
- Coordinates: 35°59′46″N 49°37′14″E
- Country: Iran
- Province: Qazvin
- County: Takestan
- District: Central
- Established as a city: 2004

Area
  - Total: 20 km^{2} (7.7 sq mi)

Population (2016)
  - Total: 5,604
  - Density: 280/km^{2} (730/sq mi)
- Time zone: UTC+3:30 (IRST)

Narjeh (Persian: نرجه) (Note: Also romanized as Nerjeh; also known as Nīrja) is a city in the Central District of Takestan County, Qazvin province, Iran, serving as the administrative center for Narjeh Rural District. The village of Narjeh was converted to a city in 2004.

== Demographics ==
=== Ethnicity ===
This city is populated by Azerbaijani Turks.

=== Population ===
At the time of the 2006 National Census, the city's population was 5,071 in 1,297 households. The following census in 2011 counted 5,404 people in 1,505 households. The 2016 census measured the population of the city as 5,604 people in 1,661 households.

== Attractions ==
Among the sights of Narjeh are the ancient hill of Narjeh and the tomb of Emamzadeh Zarlan.
