= Narjeh Rural District =

Rural district in Qazvin province, Iran

Narjeh Rural District Persian: دهستان نرجه
- Rural District
- Location within Iran
- Coordinates: 36°02′N 49°39′E
- Country: Iran
- Province: Qazvin
- County: Takestan
- District: Central
- Established: 1991
- Capital: Narjeh

Population (2016)
  - Total: 555
- Time zone: UTC+3:30 (IRST)

Narjeh Rural District (Persian: دهستان نرجه) is in the Central District of Takestan County, Qazvin province, Iran. It is administered from the city of Narjeh.

== Demographics ==
=== Population ===
At the time of the 2006 National Census, the rural district's population was 923 in 254 households. There were 739 inhabitants in 233 households at the following census of 2011. The 2016 census measured the population of the rural district as 555 in 183 households. The most populous of its 23 villages was Qarah Bagh, with 332 people.

=== Other villages in the rural district ===
- Now Dehak
- Pivand Farms
- Shahrsanati-ye Takestan
- Shenin Qaqazan
