= Khorramdasht =

City in Qazvin province, Iran

Khorramdasht Persian: خرمدشت
- City
- Location within Iran
- Coordinates: 35°55′48″N 49°30′46″E
- Country: Iran
- Province: Qazvin
- County: Takestan
- District: Khorramdasht
- Established as a city: 1999

Population (2016)
  - Total: 6,554
- Time zone: UTC+3:30 (IRST)

Khorramdasht (Persian: خرمدشت) (Note: Formerly the village of Nahavand (نهاوند), or Azerbaijani: Nəhavənd) is a city in, and the capital of, Khorramdasht District in Takestan County, Qazvin province, Iran. It is also the administrative center for Ramand-e Shomali Rural District. The village of Nahavand was converted to the city of Khorramdasht in 1999.

== Demographics ==
=== Ethnicity and language ===
This city is populated by Azerbaijani Turks.

=== Population ===
At the time of the 2006 National Census, the city's population was 6,192 in 1,590 households. The following census in 2011 counted 6,725 people in 1,954 households. The 2016 census measured the population of the city as 6,554 people in 1,997 households.
