= Oxiana =

Oxiana is the region surrounding the Amu Darya River which flows along Afghanistan's northern border separating it from Tajikistan and Uzbekistan before turning northwest into Turkmenistan to the Aral Sea.

In ancient times, the river was known as the Oxus in Greek. The area was known to the Greeks as Bactria from the name of its capital and central city of Bactra. In the Middle Bronze Age, the region was home to what is now known as the Bactria–Margiana Archaeological Complex, also known as the Oxus Civilization.

Robert Byron wrote about Oxiana in his book The Road to Oxiana, describing his ten-month-long journey to Persia and Afghanistan in 1933–34, which included visiting the remains of Bactra at Balkh.
