= Sheikh Lotfollah Mosque =

UNESCO World Heritage Site in Isfahan, Iran

- مسجد شیخ لطف الله
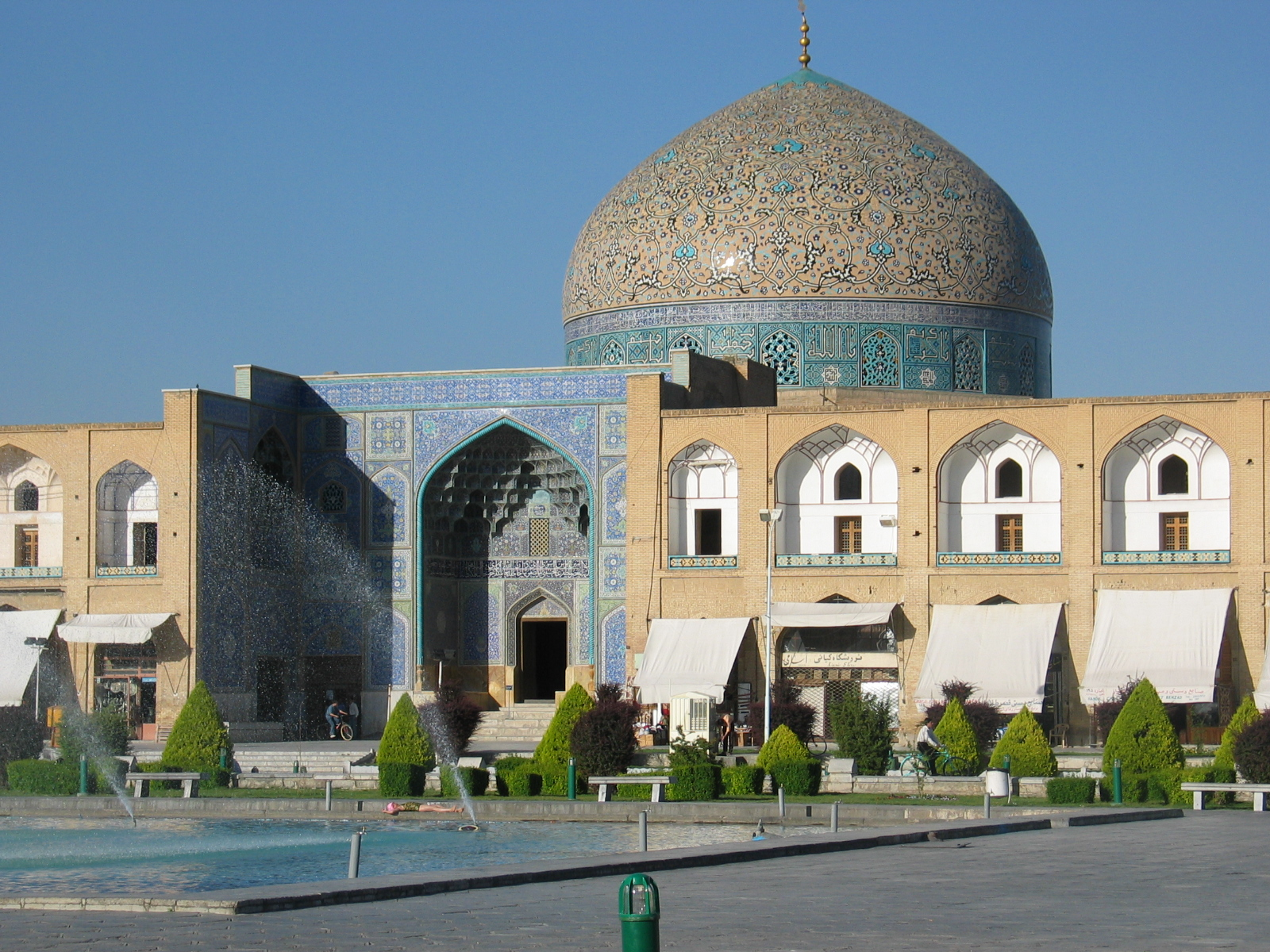

- Location within Iran

Religion
- Affiliation: Shia Islam
- Ecclesiastical or organisational status: Mosque
- Status: Active

Location
- Location: Naqsh-e Jahan Square, Isfahan, Isfahan Province
- Country: Iran
- Coordinates: 32°39′26″N 51°40′44″E

Architecture
- Type: Mosque
- Style: Safavid
- Founder: Abbas the Great
- Groundbreaking: 1011 AH (1602/1603 CE)
- Completed: 1028 AH (1618/1619 CE); 1920s CE (restoration)

Specifications
- Interior area: 2,500 m^{2} (27,000 sq ft)
- Dome: 1
- Dome height (outer): 32 m (105 ft)
- Dome dia. (outer): 22 m (72 ft)
- Materials: Stone; bricks; mortar; marble; ceramic tiles

UNESCO World Heritage Site
- Official name: Sheikh Lotf Allah Mosque
- Type: Built
- Criteria: Cultural: (i)(v)(vi)
- Designated: 1979
- Part of: Naqsh-e Jahan Square
- Reference no.: 115
- Complex comprises: Maidan – The Royal Square; Masjed-e Shah; Ālī Qāpū Palace; The Imperial Bazaar

Iran National Heritage List
- Official name: Sheikh Lotfollah Mosque
- Type: Mosque
- Designated: 1932
- Reference no.: 105
- Conservation organization: Cultural Heritage, Handicrafts and Tourism Organization of Iran

The Sheikh Lotfollah Mosque (Persian: مسجد شیخ لطف الله, romanized: Masjed-e Sheykh Lotfollah;) (Note: Also transliterated as Lotfallah, Lotf Allah, Lutfullah, Lutfallah, Lutf Allah.) is a Shi'ite mosque, located on the eastern side of Naqsh-e Jahan Square, Isfahan, Iran. Construction of the mosque started in 1011 AH (1602/1603 CE) and was finished in 1028 AH (1618/1619 CE). It is one of the masterpieces of Iranian architecture from the Safavid era. It was designed by the chief architect Muhammad Reza during the reign of Shah Abbas the Great. On the advice of Arthur Upham Pope, Reza Shah Pahlavi had the mosque restored in the 1920s.

The Sheikh Lotfollah Mosque, completed in the Safavid style, is one of the most important architectural projects built on Isfahan's maidan, prominent for its location, scale, design, and ornamentation. The mosque is registered, along with the Naghsh-e Jahan Square and other surrounding structures, as a UNESCO World Heritage Site; and was added to the Iran National Heritage List on 6 January 1932, administered by the Cultural Heritage, Handicrafts and Tourism Organization of Iran.

== History ==
The purpose of this mosque was for it to be private to the royal court (unlike the Shah Mosque, which was meant for the public). For this reason, the mosque does not have any minarets and is smaller. Indeed, few Westerners at the time of the Safavids even paid any attention to this mosque, and they certainly did not have access to it.

Interior view

To avoid having to walk across the Naqsh-e Jahan Square to the mosque, Shah Abbas had the architect build a tunnel spanning the piazza from the Ali Qapu Palace to the mosque. On reaching the entrance of the mosque, one would have to walk through a passage that winds round and round, until one finally reached the main building. Along this passage there were standing guards, and the obvious purpose of this design was to shield the women of the harem as much as possible from anyone's entering the building. These doors are open to worshippers and visitors, and the passage underneath the piazza is no longer in use.

=== Sheikh Lotfollah ===
The mosque was named in 1622 after Shaykh Lutfallah Maysi al-'Amili (d.1622), a prominent religious scholar and teacher (and father-in-law to Shah 'Abbas) who came to Isfahan at the orders of Shah 'Abbas, and resided on the site, but was never involved in the mosque's construction.

Throughout its history, this mosque has been referred to by different names. For Junabadi it was the mosque with the great dome (Masjed-e qubbat-e ’azim) and the domed mosque (qubbat masjed), while contemporary historian Iskandar Munshi referred to it as the mosque of great purity and beauty. On the other hand, European travellers, such as Jean Chardin, referred to the mosque using the current name, and Quranic inscriptions within the mosque, done by Iranian calligrapher Baqir Banai, also include the name of Sheikh Lutfallah. In addition, the reckonings of Muhibb Ali Beg, the Imperial Treasurer, show that the Imam's salary came directly from the imperial household's resources. All this suggests that not only was the building indeed named after Sheikh Lutfallah, but also, that this famous imam was among the first prayer-leaders for the royal court in this very mosque.

== Architecture ==
The mosque is more similar in type to a mausoleum than a four-iwan mosque. Architectural historians ascribe this either to the fact that members of the Shah's family had used it for private worship or that it had functioned as a women's sanctuary. The building was completed in 1028 AH (1618/1619 CE).

According to Sheila Blair and Jonathan Bloom, the architect of the building was Muhammad Reza (or Muhammad Riza), son of Husayn, a builder from Isfahan, whose name appears on an inscription around the mihrab. Other names found in the mosque's inscriptions are Ali Reza al-Abbasi, a calligrapher who also worked later on the Shah Mosque nearby, and Baqir Banna' (Baqir the Builder).

=== Entrance iwan ===
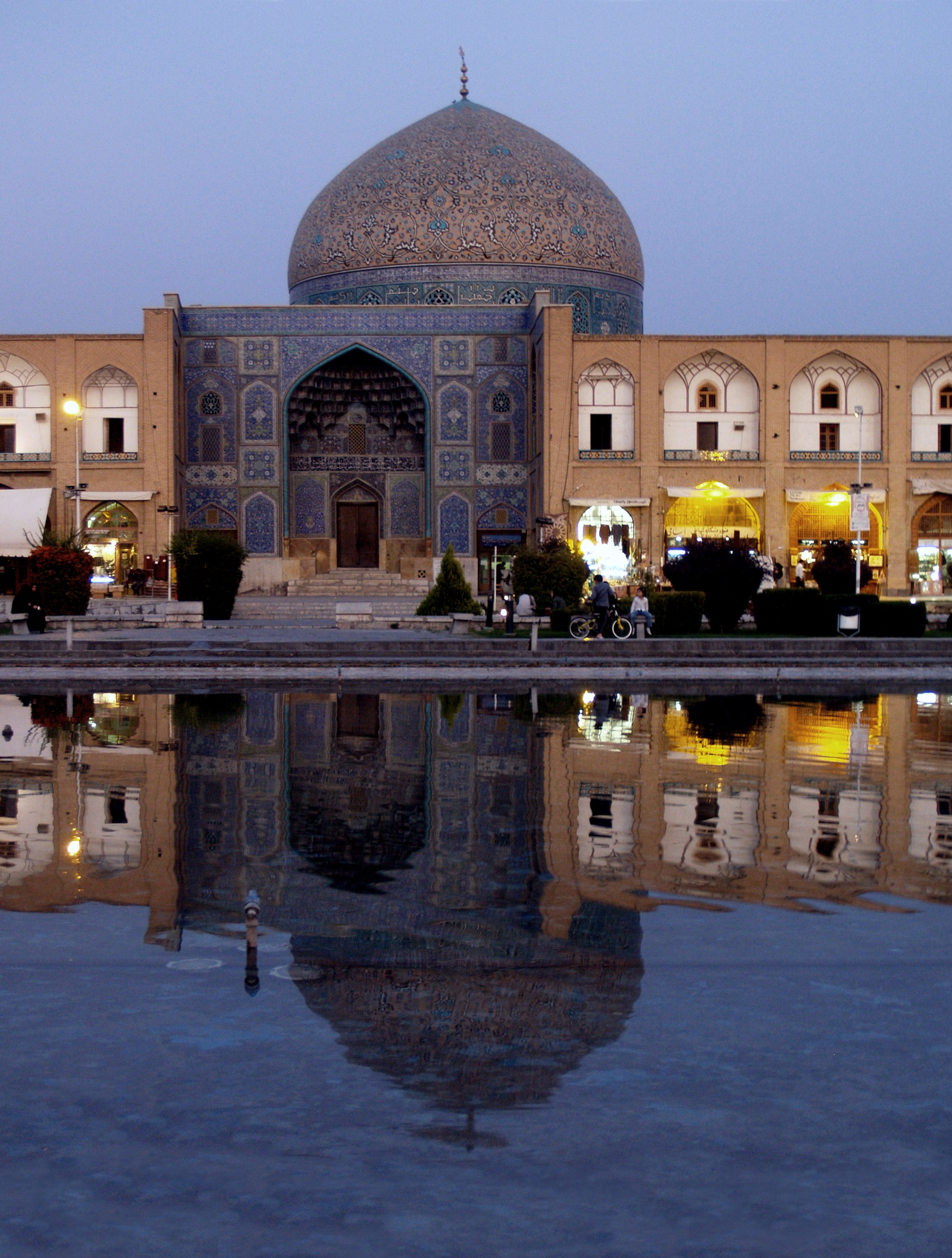
The dome does not stand directly behind the entrance, but is offset to the south.

The entrance gateway, like those of the Grand Bazaar and the Masjed-e Shah, was a recessed half-moon. Also, as in the Masjed-e Shah, the lower façade of the mosque and the gateway are constructed of marble, while the haft-rang tiles (Persian: هفت‌رنگی, romanized: seven-coloured "polychrome mosaics") decorate the upper parts of the structure.

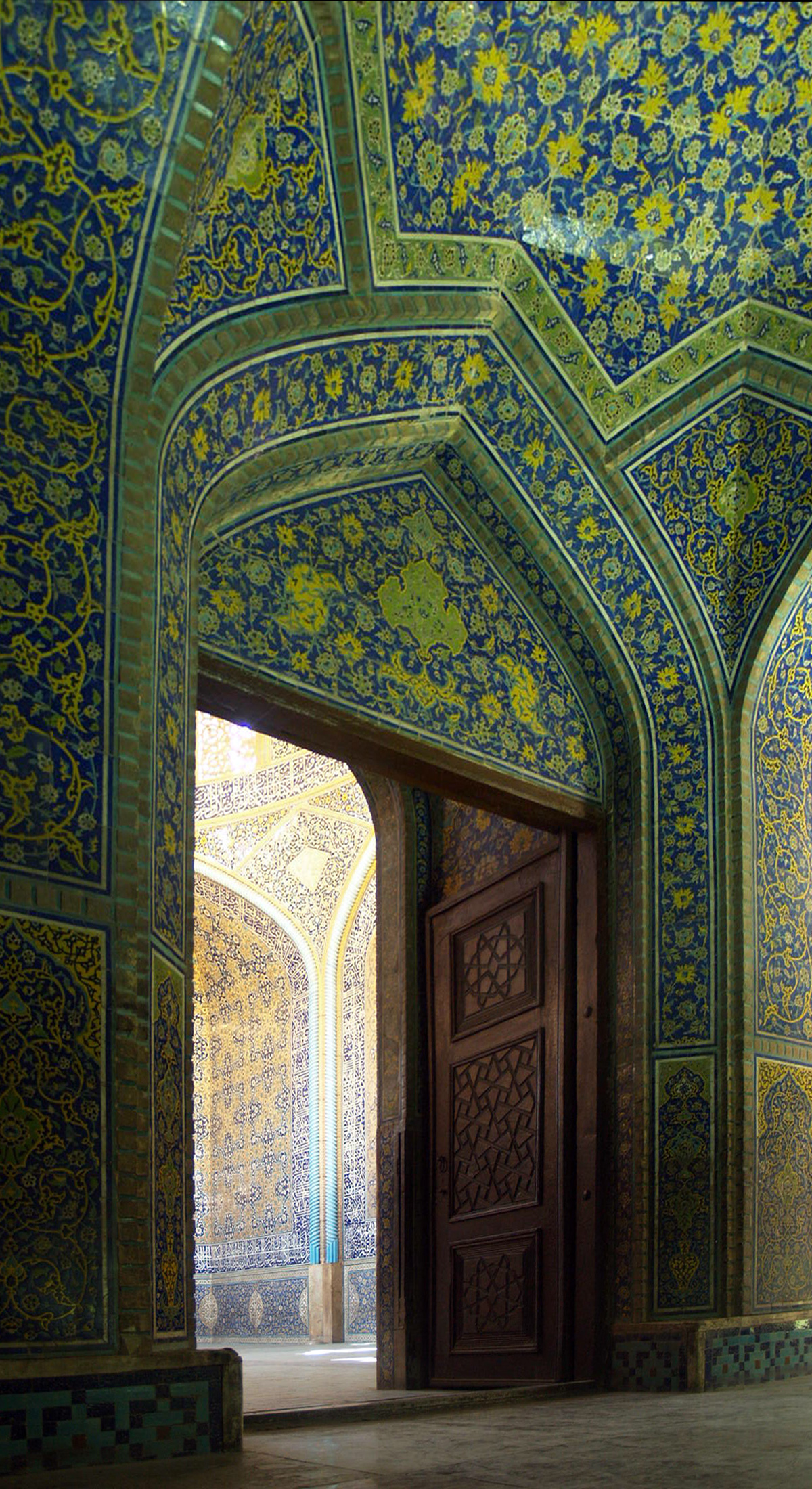
Entrance door leading from the L-shaped vestibule into the mosque.

The monument's architect solved the problem of the difference between the direction of qibla and the portal iwan by devising an L-shaped connecting vestibule between the entrance and the enclosure. The north–south orientation of the maydan does not agree with south-west direction of qibla; it is set at 45 degrees to it. This feature, called pāshnah (پاشنه) in Persian architecture, has caused the dome to stand not exactly behind the entrance iwan.

The recessed small court flows from the maydan and is linked, on its north and south sides, to the continuous corridor that envelopes the maydan's mercantile facilities. As a result, when viewed from the maydan, the mosque's main portal iwan and dome do not fall on the same axis, as is always the case in other mosques, but instead the dome appears behind the main portal iwan as if having slid 6.5 metres (21 ft) to the right from its axis. This asymmetrical layout was initially introduced to reconcile the (southwest) direction of Mecca with the placement of the mihrab on the qibla wall, and adds visual complexity to the structure.

The portal iwan is elaborately ornamented in colorful mosaics that contrast with the maydan's sand-colored bricks. Built as a recessed area on the eastern wall of the court, the portal iwan is an elevated platform raised by four steps from the court level. An inscription band in white on a dark blue background runs horizontally on the three sides of the portal niche, above which begins the iwan's vault, comprising four clusters of muqarnases made of small glazed-tiles units. One of the inscriptions on this portal gives the date of the start of construction. A pointed-arch doorway is located below the inscription band and is flanked by two panels of mosaics of floral arabesques with motifs in yellow, white, and blue on a dark blue background. These panels rest on top of a continuous marble dado.

The offset entry does not allow the visitor to enter the prayer chamber directly from the maydan by passing through the main portal iwan, which is aligned on the east–west axis. Due to the mosque's alignment on the northeast–southwest axis, upon entering the mosque one walks along two corridors, oriented respectively to the northeast and southeast, which are placed adjacent to the northwest and northeast walls of the prayer chamber. Turning southwest to face the qibla wall, one enters the domed chamber to see the mihrab on the opposite wall. This journey into gradual deepening into darkness and reemergence into a room bathed with light reflected on the glazed revetment is one of the most rewarding experiences of the building. In The Road to Oxiana, Robert Byron wrote about this sight:

"I know of no finer example of the Persian Islamic genius than the interior of the dome. The dome is inset with a network of lemon-shaped compartments, which decrease in size as they ascend towards the formalised peacock at the apex... The mihrāb in the west wall is enamelled with tiny flowers on a deep blue meadow. Each part of the design, each plane, each repetition, each separate branch or blossom has its own sombre beauty. But the beauty of the whole comes as you move. Again, the highlights are broken by the play of glazed and unglazed surfaces; so that with every step they rearrange themselves in countless shining patterns... I have never encountered splendour of this kind before."

— Robert Byron in The Road to Oxiana.

=== Size and area ===
Sheikh Lotfollah Mosque

In contrast to the grand size of the maydan's space, the Sheikh Lotfollah Mosque is very small and consists of a single domed chamber (19 metres (62 ft) on a side), surrounded by rooms – that possibly functioned as service areas – on its sides, and preceded by a portal iwan overlooking the maydan. The two rooms accessed from the corridor which envelopes the sanctuary dome measure 6 by 9 metres (20 by 30 ft); one is found on the western side of the corridor, and the other along the far end of the eastern wall. A third room – 8 by 16 metres (26 by 52 ft) – is located on the exterior of the southern wall of the sanctuary, and is accessed via the corridor running along the maydan wall and then turning right after the vestibule area. Although the Sheikh Lotfollah is not a rectangular structure, its masses can be measured as one rectangular area of 44 by 30 metres (144 by 98 ft) and an additional rectangular service area comprising approximately 152 square metres (1,640 sq ft).

Compared with the Shah Mosque, the design of the Sheikh Lotf Allah Mosque is quite simple: there is no sahn, and there are no interior iwans. The building itself consists of a flattened dome resting on a square dome chamber. However, in contrast to the simple structure of the mosque, the decoration of both interior and exterior is exceedingly complex, and in its construction the finest materials were used and the most talented craftsmen employed.

=== Dome ===
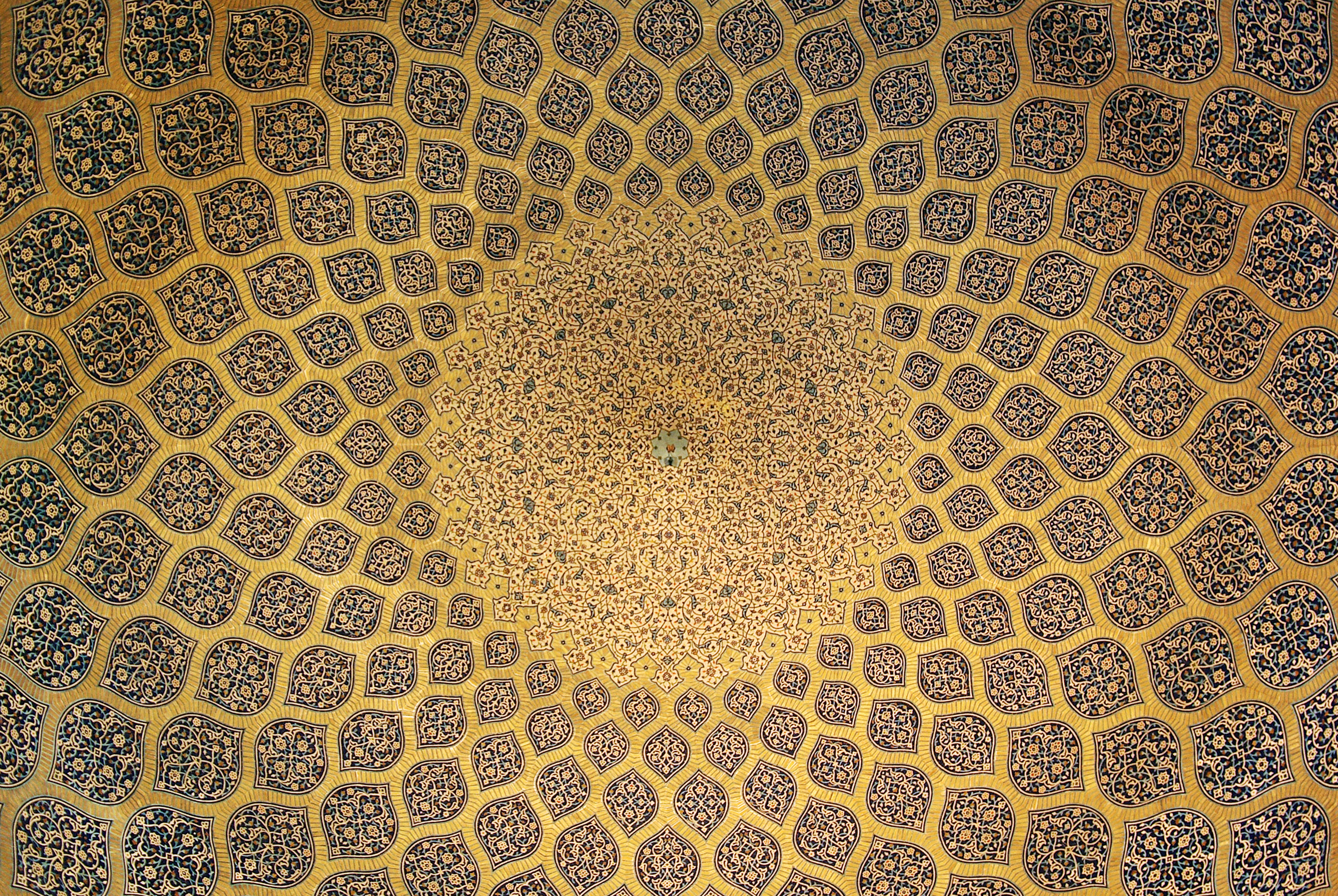
The interior side of the dome. The decoration seems to lead the eye upwards toward its center, as the rings of ornamental bands filled with arabesque patterns become smaller and smaller.

The dome is one of the few single-shell domes of the Safavid architecture – 13 metres (43 ft) in diameter – with a structure consisting of three levels. Four squinches of pointed-arched panels, framed by an inscription band in white and blue demarcated by light blue cable moldings, ascend from the floor and support sixteen kite-shaped shields that, in turn, support the drum, which comprises sixteen arched panels. The drum is ornamented with alternating double-grilles windows with an arabesque pattern. The interior dome has a sunburst from which descend medallions inscribing floral motifs, which become larger as they descend away from the center. The exterior of the dome is ornamented with an arabesque of a floral motif in white, blue, and black against a yellow background.

The "peacock" at the centre of the interior side of the dome is one of the unique characteristics of the mosque. If you stand at the entrance gate of the inner hall and look at the center of the dome, a peacock, whose tail is the sunrays coming in from the hole in the ceiling, can be seen.

On the interior side of the dome the aesthetic purpose of the long, low, gloomy passage leading to the dome chamber becomes evident, for it is with a sense of heightened anticipation that one enters the sanctuary. Lowness gives way to soaring height and gloom is dispelled by the steady illumination of nearly a score of windows.

Barbara Brend described as follows: "the turquoise cable moulding of an arch is seen below the dome, in which concentric rings of thirty-two lozenges diminish in size as they approach a centre which gives an impression of luminosity. The design, which suggests both movement and stillness, is a powerful though not an explicit vehicle of religious symbolism, speaking of the harmony of the universe. ... The support system of dome is illustrated by eight great arches of turquoise tilework in cable form which rise from a low dado to the full height of the wall, four in the position of squinches and four against the side walls; between them are kite-shaped squinches-pendentives. Within the dome, ranks of units of tilework of ogee-mandorla form are set in a lattice of plain brick and diminish in size until they meet a central sunbrust patterned with a tracery of arabesque".

The structure of the dome of Lotfollah Mosque and that of Blue Mosque of Tabriz is believed to be derived from that of the Shah Vali Mosque in Taft, Yazd.

The tiling design of this mosque, as well as that of Shah Mosque and other Persian mosques of even before Safavid period, seems to be not completely symmetrical – particularly, in colours of patterns. They have been described as intentional, "symmetrical" asymmetries.

=== Other design influences ===
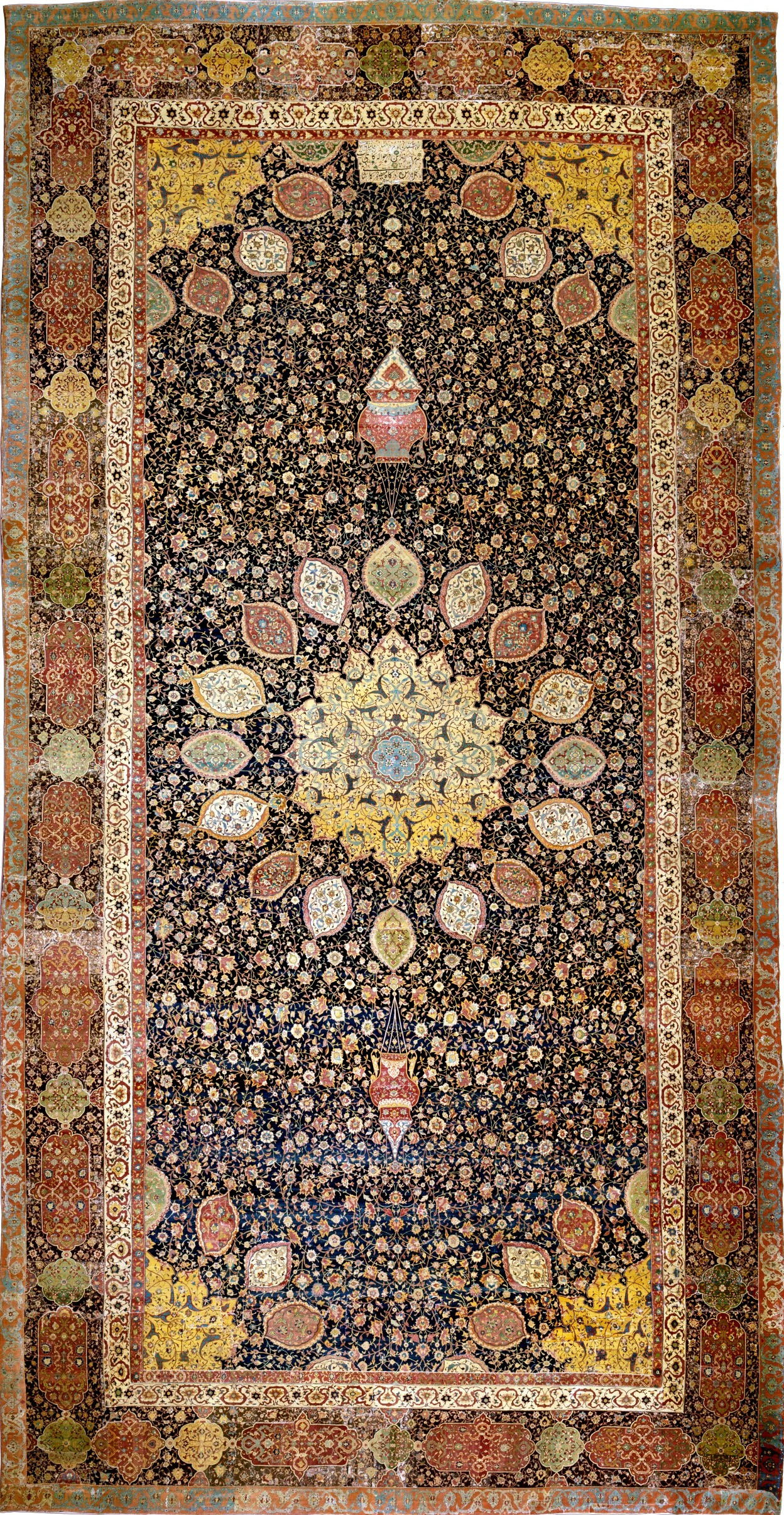
The Ardabil Carpet. The design is derived from the interior of Sheikh Lotfollah Mosque's dome.

Design of the Ardabil Carpet was from the same concept as that of the interior side of the dome. Also design of the "Carpet of Wonders", which will be the biggest carpet of the world, is based on the interior design of the dome.

It has been suggested that concepts of the mystic philosopher Suhrawardi about the unity of existence were possibly related to the pattern on the interior side of the dome. Ali Reza Abbasi, the leading calligrapher at the court of Shah Abbas, has decorated the entrance, above the door, with majestic inscriptions with the names and titles of Shah Abbas, the Husayni and the Musavi, that is, the descendants of Imams Husayn and Musa.

The running inscription in white tile on blue ground on the exterior drum of the dome, visible to the public, consists of three surah (chapters) from the Quran; al- Shams (91, The Sun), al-Insan (76, Man) and al-Kauthar (108, Abundance). The surah emphasize the rightness of a pure soul and the fate in hell of those who reject God's way, most likely referring to the Ottoman Turks.

Turning right at the entrance to the domed prayer chamber, one first encounters the full text of Surah 98, al- Bayyina, the Clear Proof. The message of this chapter is that clear evidence of the true scripture was not available to the People of the Book (i.e. Christians or Jews) until God sent his messenger Muhammad. The horizontal band of script at the bottom of the arch is not Quranic, but states that God's blessings are on the (Shi’i) martyrs. Thus, Shi’i invocation echoes the Quranic verses in its stress on the truthfulness of God's message.

The fact that two poems by Shaykh Bahai, a devoted Sufi, grace the walls of Shah Abbas' private mosque, proves that, although some Sufi elements in the empire were suppressed, Sufism as a general phenomenon continued to play an important role in the Safavid society.

The design of the interior of the dome also inspired the design of the Azadi Square, Tehran.

== Gallery ==
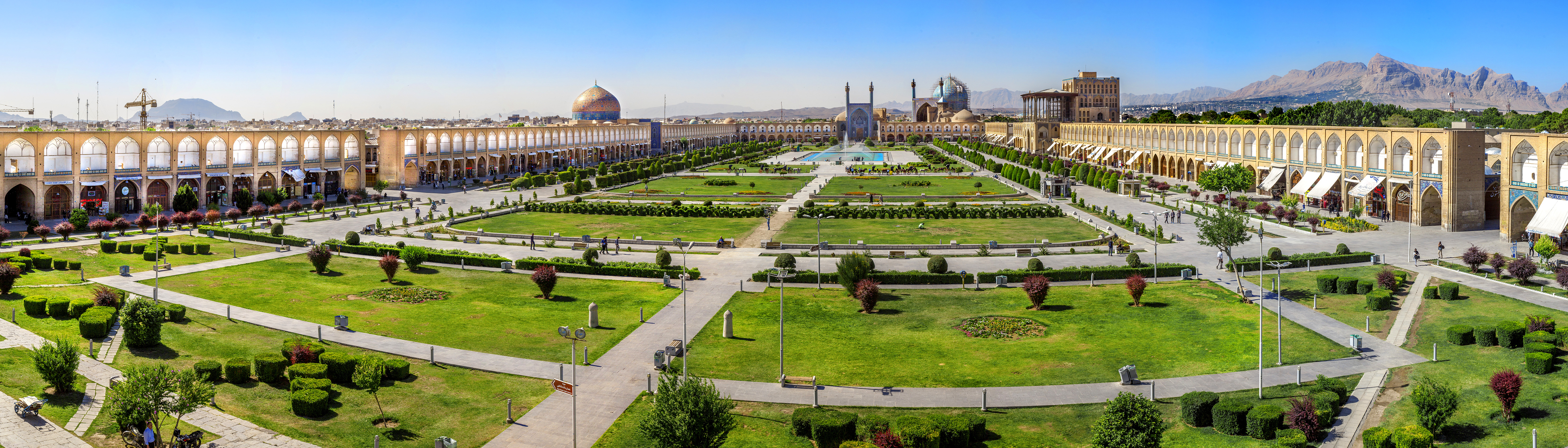
Naqsh-e Jahan Square: Sheikh Lotfollah Mosque (left), Shah Mosque (center) and Ali Qapu (right), 2020.
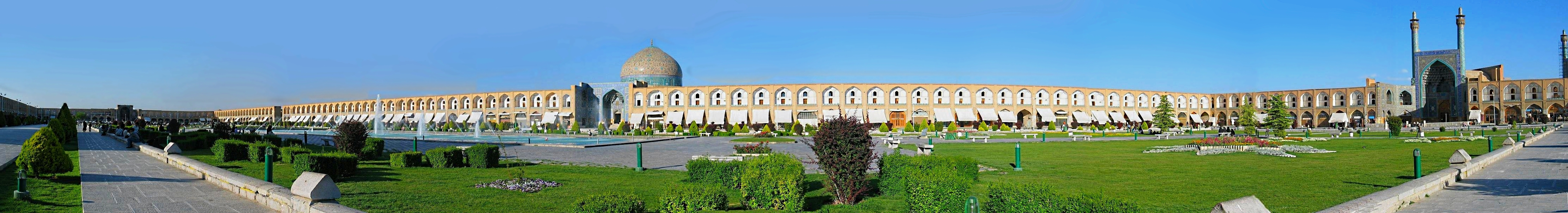
Panoramic view, 2007 or earlier.
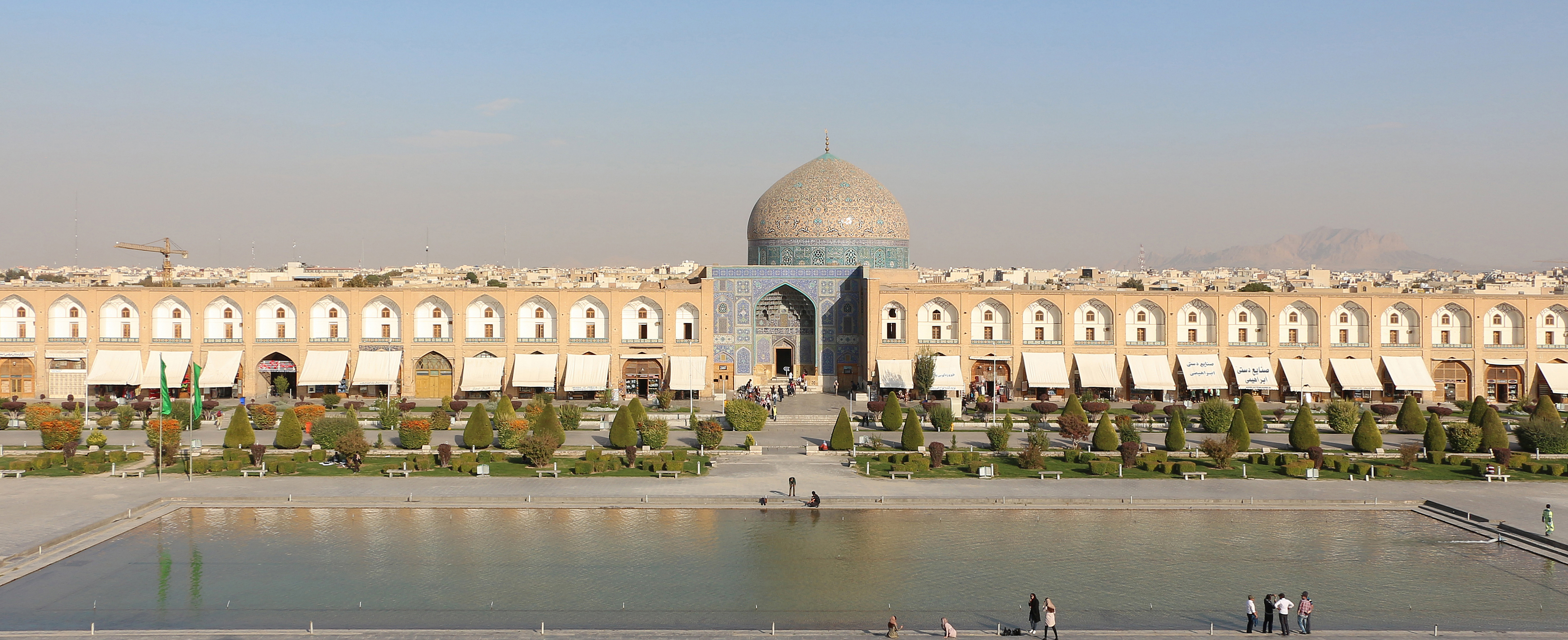
Front view - as seen from the balcony of the Ali Qapu Palace

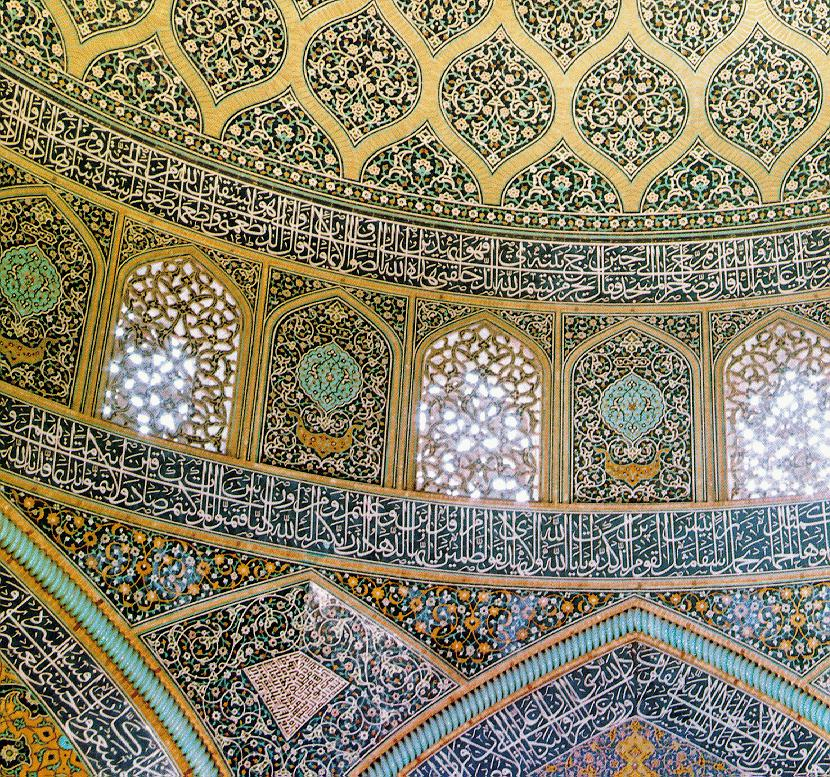
Interior design detail

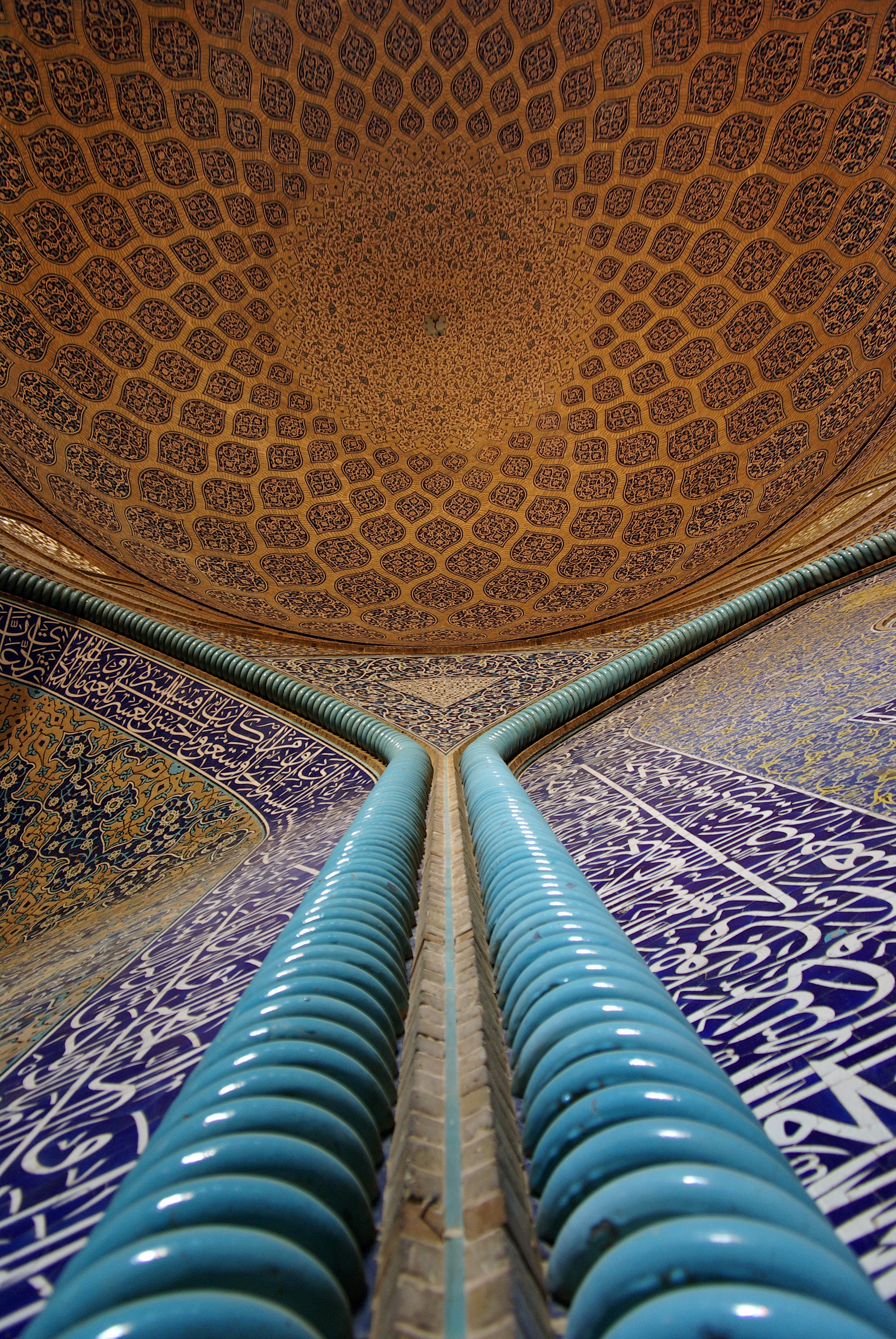
Interior wall and ceiling

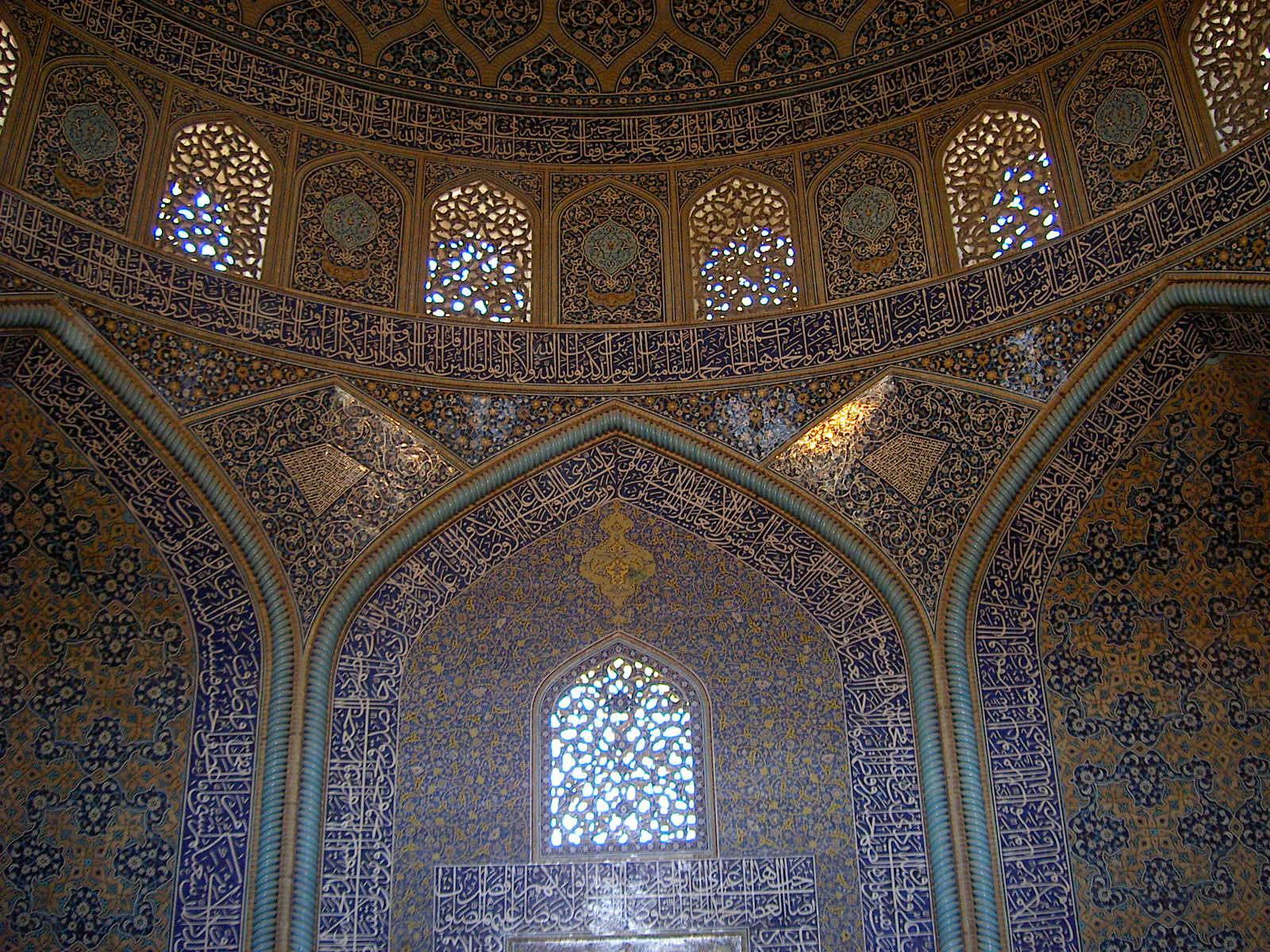
Interior of the dome

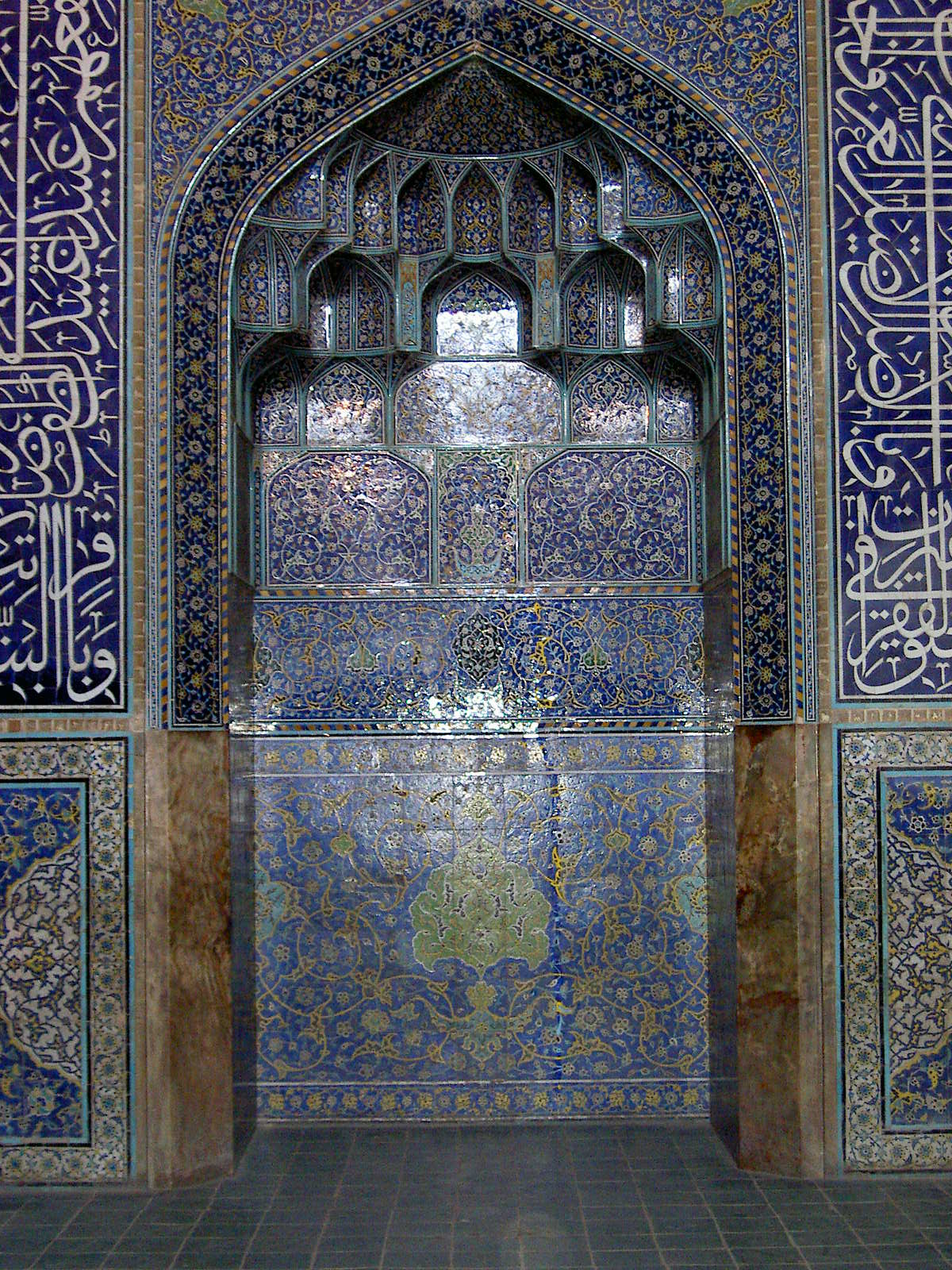
Mihrab

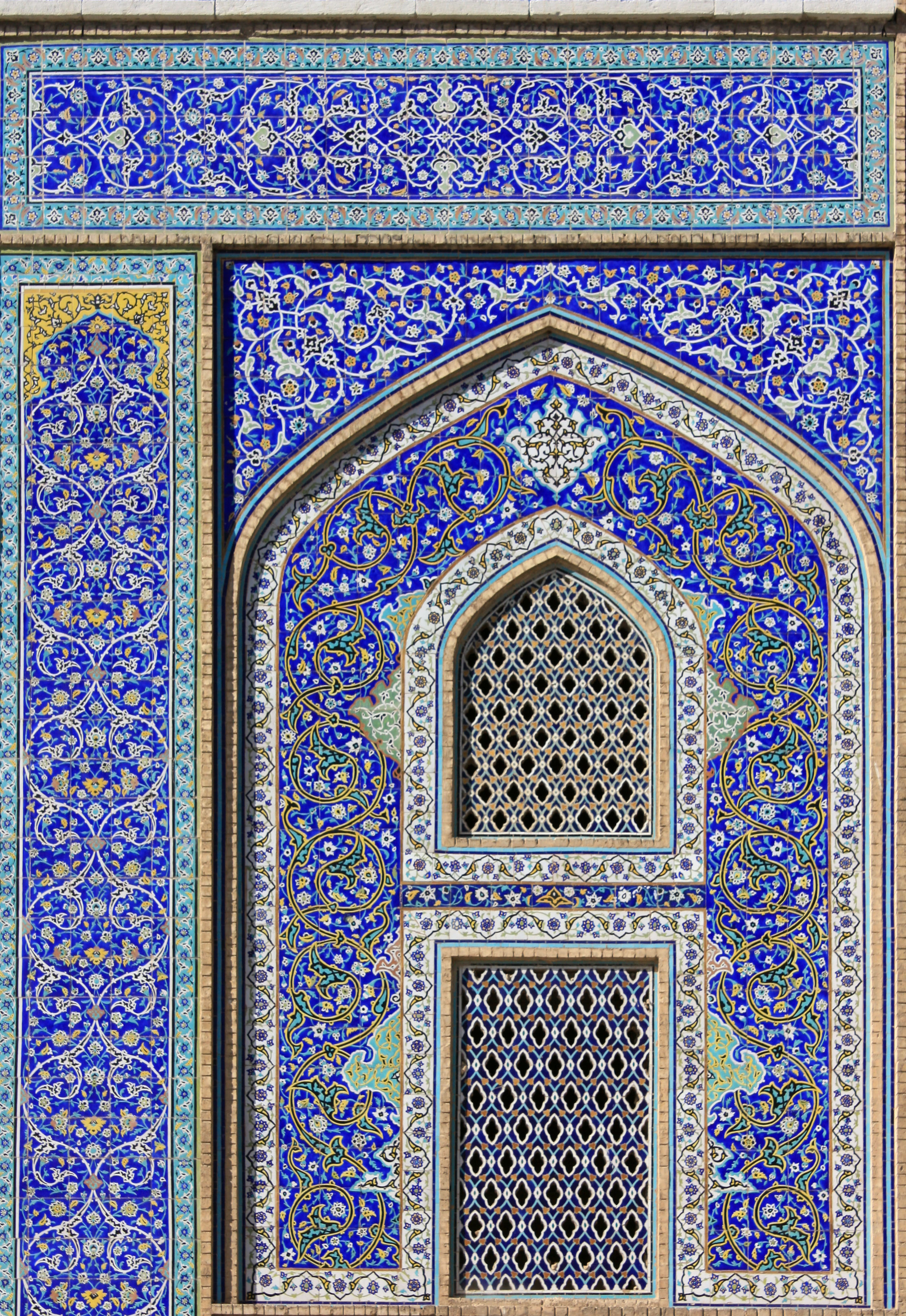
Tiles in the rinceau style

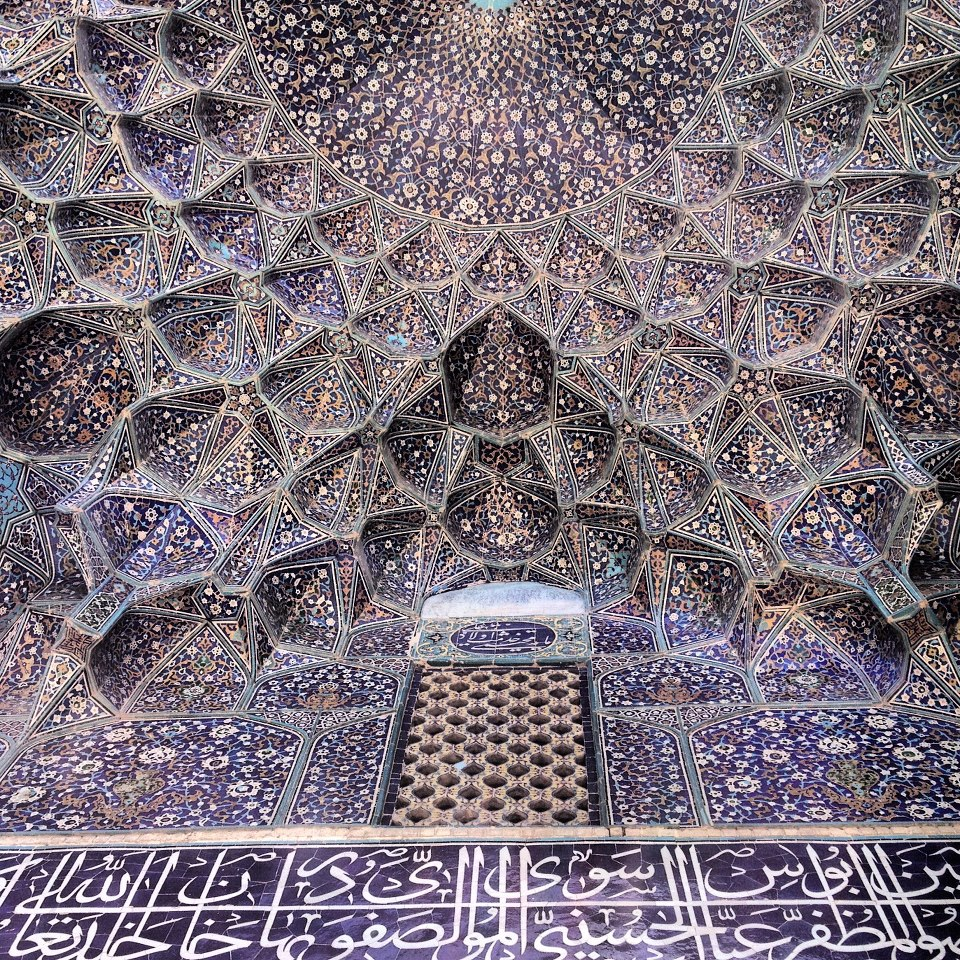
Iwan interior

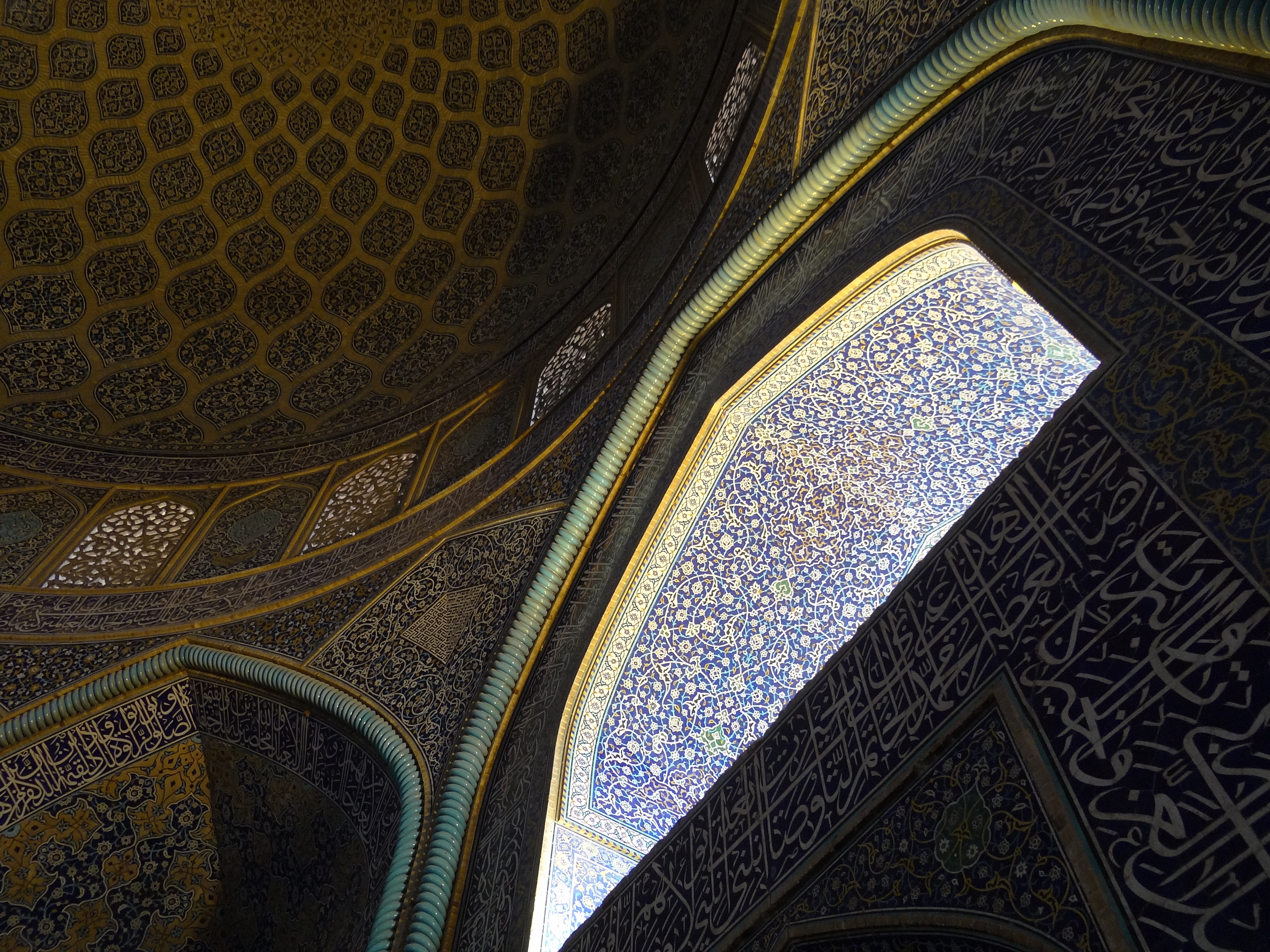
Interior detail

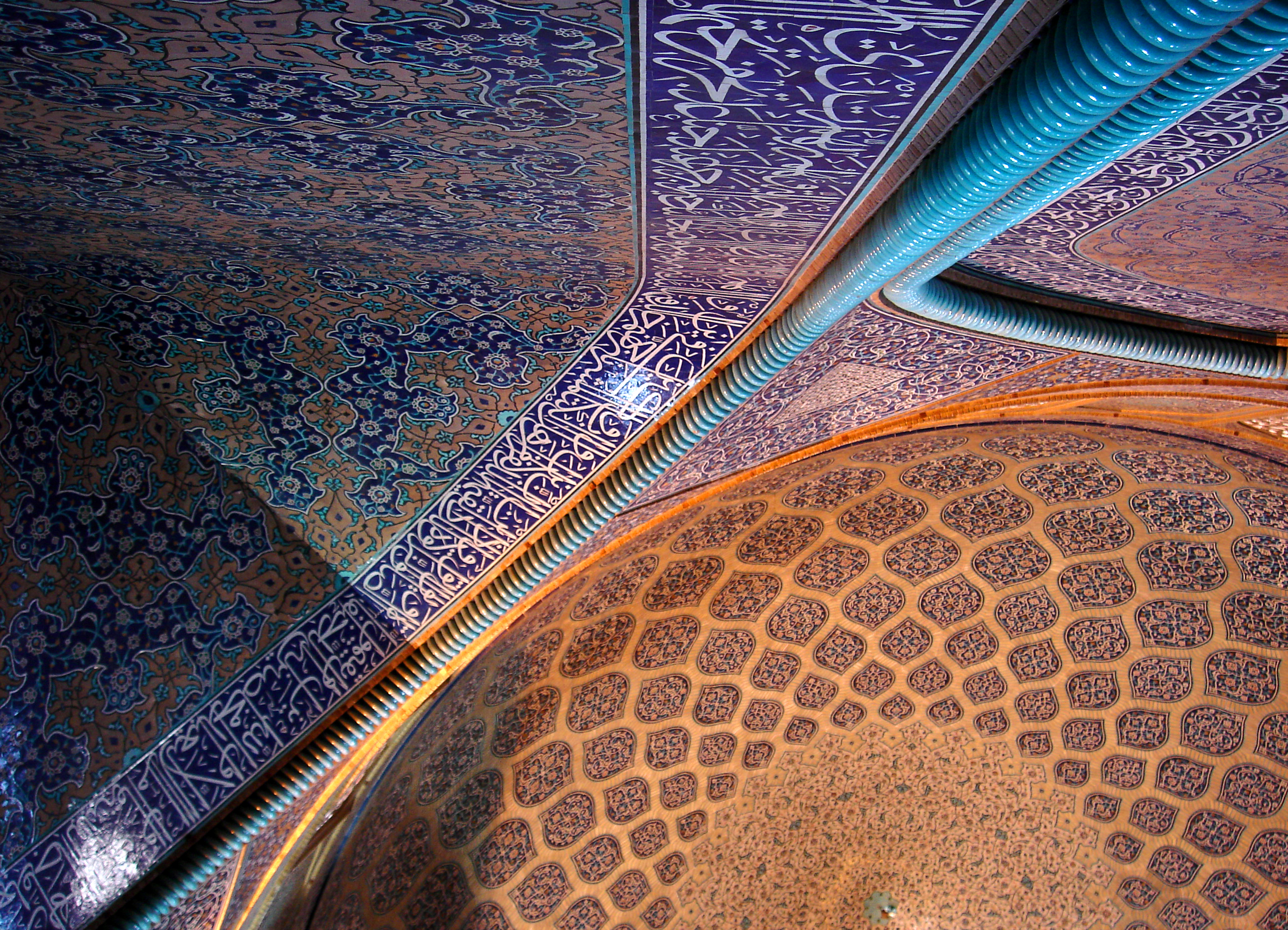
Dome interior

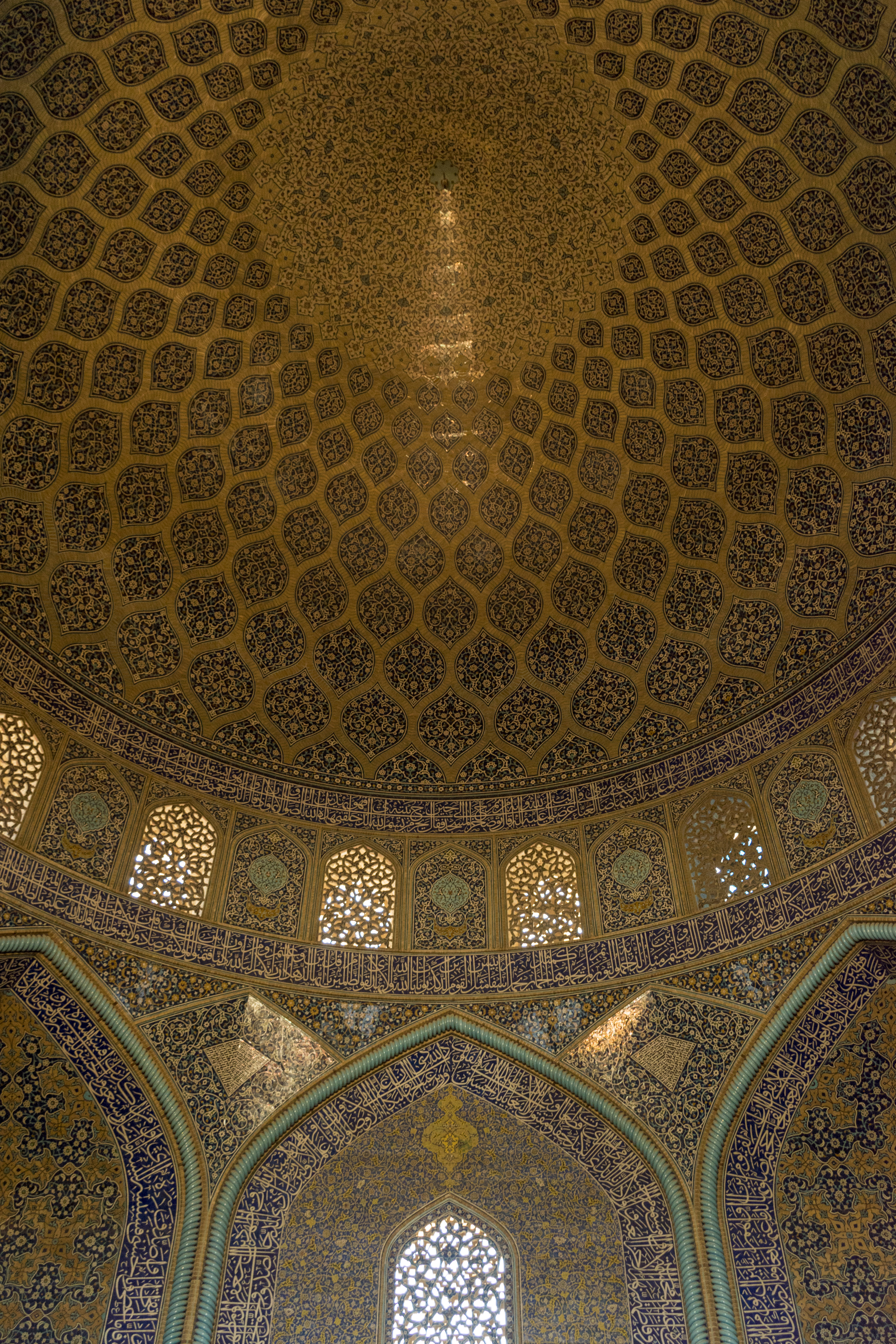
Interior detail

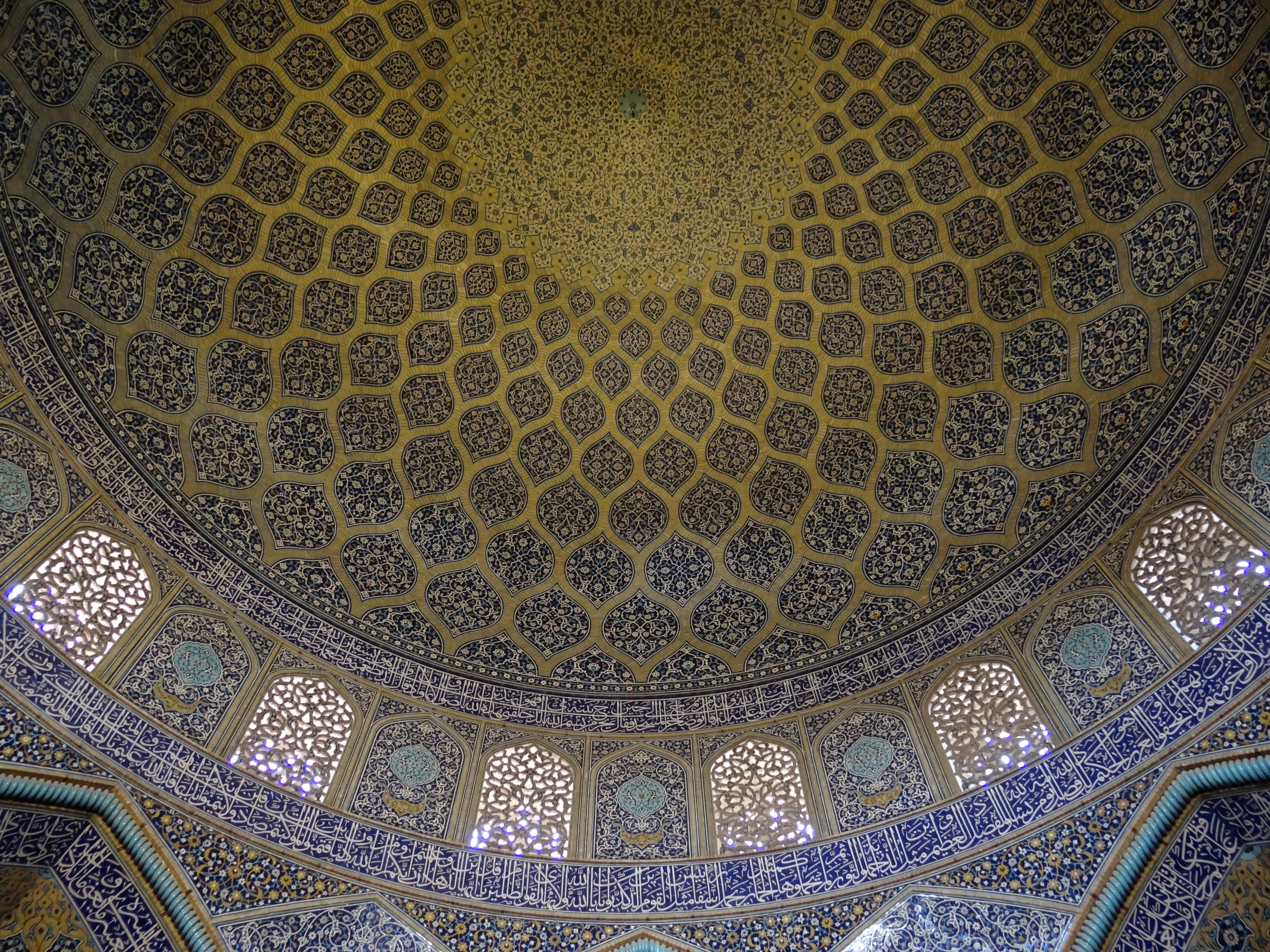
Dome interior

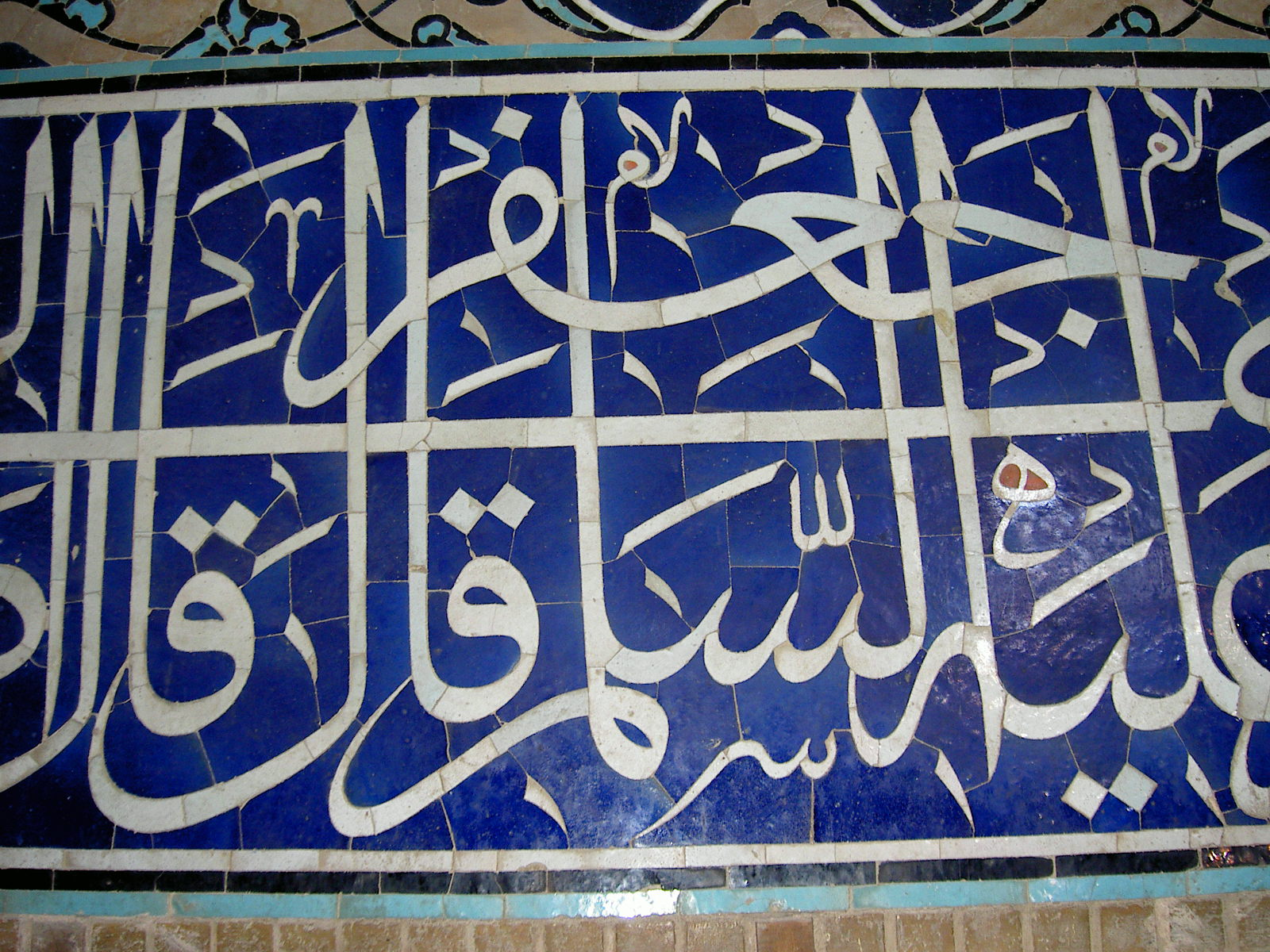
The inscriptions on the dome, written by Ali Reza Abbasi, in thuluth and nasta'liq styles.

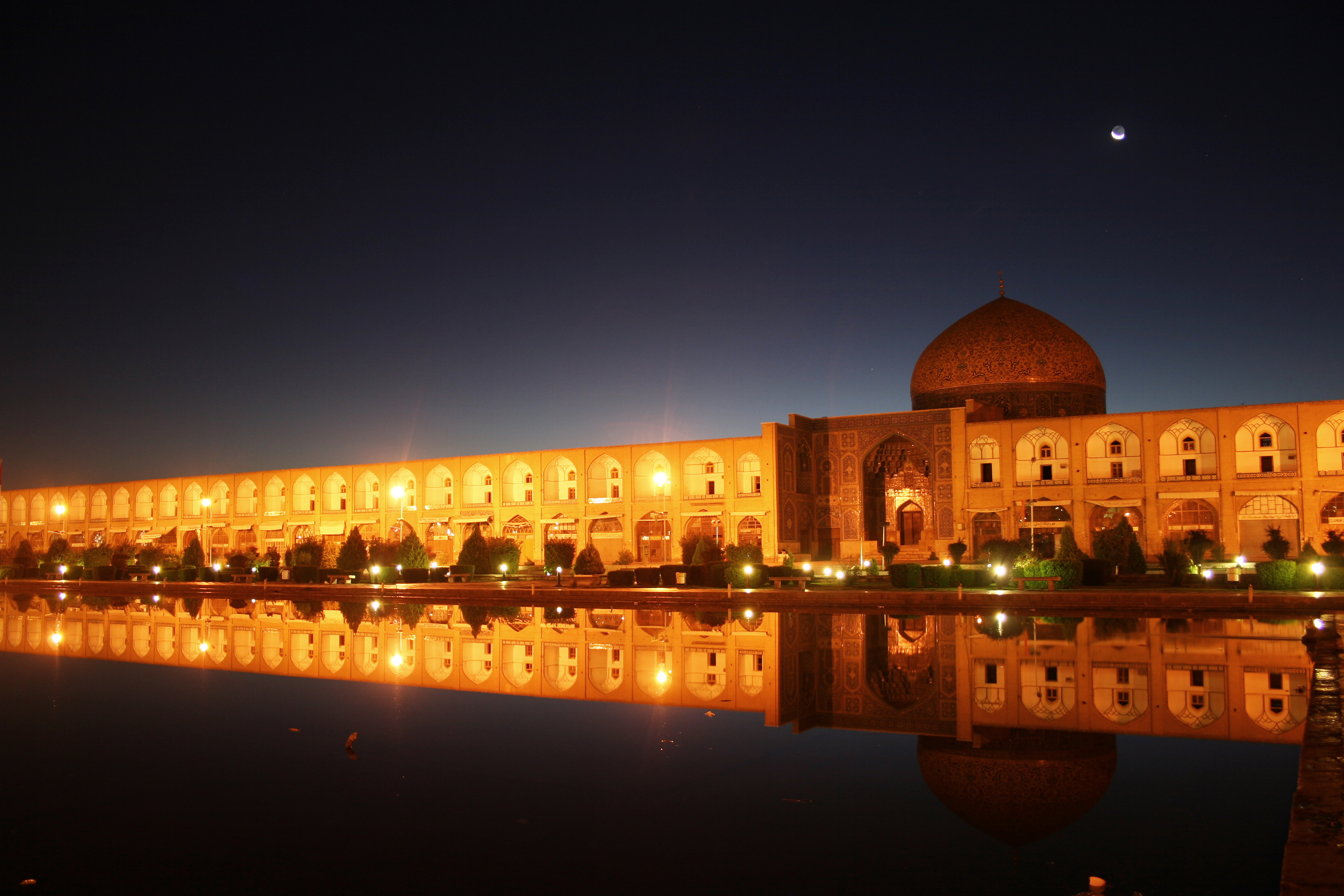
Naqsh-e Jahan Square at night

== See also ==
- Shia Islam in Iran
- List of mosques in Iran
- List of historical structures in Isfahan
- Chehel Sotoun
- Hasht Behesht
- Persian domes
