= Sevkaretsi Sako =

Armenian revolutionary

- Սևքարեցի Սաքո
- Born: 14 January 1870; Sevkar, Russian Empire
- Died: 13 November 1908 (aged 38); Persia
- Military career
- Allegiance: Dashnaktsutyun
- Service years: ?—1908
- Conflicts: Armenian National Liberation Movement; Khanasor Expedition (1897); Persian Constitutional Revolution (1906)

Sevkaretsi Sako (Armenian: Սևքարեցի Սաքո; January 14, 1870 – November 13, 1908) was an Armenian revolutionary and member of the Armenian Revolutionary Federation.

== Life ==
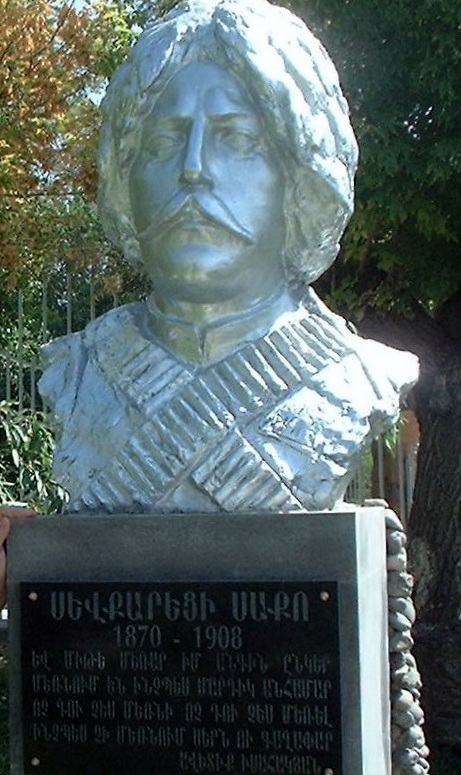
The bust of Sevkaretsi Sako in Yerevan

Sevkaretsi Sako was born as Sarkis Tsovanyan in the Sevkar village of the Russian Empire, currently located at the northeastern part of Armenia. He establish relations with such prominent Armenian revolutionaries as Sarkis Gugunian, Kristapor Mikaelian, and Rosdom.

In 1892 Sevkaretsi Sako resided in the monastery of Derik, near the Iranian-Turkish border in order to facilitate the transfer of Armenian volunteer soldiers, equipment, and weapons into Western Armenia.

In 1897 he took part in the Khanasor Expedition as commander of the cavalry group where an offensive from Armenian revolutionary fighters against the Kurdish Mazrik tribe resulted in a victory. After the campaign was finished, Sevkaretsi Sako settled in Echmiatsin but soon returned to Western Armenia where he was arrested by Turkish police in Van, and was given a 101-year prison sentence. In 1901 he was however given opportunity to be prosecuted through a Russian court which allowed him to be released.

During the Armenian-Tatar clashes in 1905, Sevkaretsi Sako organized the self-defense of Gazakh-Shamshadin. After the clashes, he eventually took part in the Persian Constitutional Revolution as a commander of cavalry.

In 1908 he died of cholera at the age of 38.

== Legacy ==
A street is named after Sevkaretsi Sako in Armenia.

In the village of his birthplace Sevkar, a bust of Sevkaretsi Sako has been inaugurated in his honor.

A 194-page book was written by V. Valatian in 1959 which describes in detail about Sevkaretsi Sako's life and achievements.

== See also ==
- Armenian resistance
- Armenian national liberation movement
