= Yarabad-e Olya =

Yarabad-e Olya يارابادعليا
- Village
- Country: Iran
- Province: Ilam
- County: Darreh Shahr
- Bakhsh: Central
- Rural District: Zarrin Dasht

Population (2006)
  - Total: 91
- Time zone: UTC+3:30 (IRST)
  - Summer (DST): UTC+4:30 (IRDT)

Yarabad-e Olya (Persian: يارابادعليا, also Romanized as Yārābād-e ‘Olyā) is a village in Zarrin Dasht Rural District, in the Central District of Darreh Shahr County, Ilam Province, Iran. At the 2006 census, its population was 91, in 16 families.
