= Yarabad, Kakavand =

Yarabad يارآباد
- Village
- Location within Iran
- Coordinates: 34°11′12″N 47°46′12″E
- Country: Iran
- Province: Lorestan
- County: Delfan
- Bakhsh: Kakavand
- Rural District: Kakavand-e Sharqi

Population (2006)
  - Total: 86
- Time zone: UTC+3:30 (IRST)
  - Summer (DST): UTC+4:30 (IRDT)

Yarabad (Persian: يارآباد, also Romanized as Yārābād; also known as Pārābād and Yaryiabad (Persian: ياري آباد), also Romanized as Yāryīābād) is a village in Kakavand-e Sharqi Rural District, Kakavand District, Delfan County, Lorestan Province, Iran. At the 2006 census, its population was 86, in 16 families.
