= Aghcheh Kand =

Aghcheh Kand اغچه كند
- Village
- Location within Iran
- Coordinates: 37°48′24″N 47°15′00″E
- Country: Iran
- Province: East Azerbaijan
- County: Sarab
- Bakhsh: Central
- Rural District: Abarghan

Population (2006)
  - Total: 174
- Time zone: UTC+3:30 (IRST)
  - Summer (DST): UTC+4:30 (IRDT)

Aghcheh Kand (Persian: اغچه كند, also Romanized as Āghcheh Kand; also known as Āqcheh Kand) is a village in Abarghan Rural District, in the Central District of Sarab County, East Azerbaijan Province, Iran. At the 2006 census, its population was 174, in 35 families.
