= Sevkar =

Sevkar Սևքար
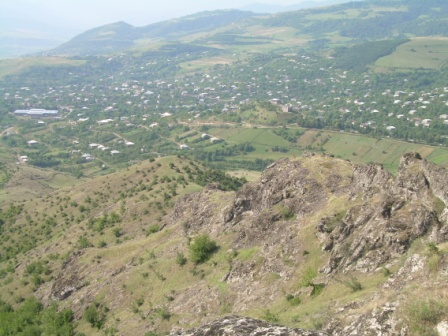
- A view of Sevkar

- Location within Armenia Location within Tavush
- Coordinates: 41°01′11″N 45°08′33″E
- Country: Armenia
- Province: Tavush
- Municipality: Ijevan

Government
  - Mayor: Vladimir Margaryan

Population (2011)
  - Total: 2,193
- Time zone: UTC+4 (AMT)

Sevkar (Armenian: Սևքար, lit. 'Black Stone') is a village in the Ijevan Municipality of the Tavush Province of Armenia. Sevkar is the birthplace of the Armenian revolutionary leader Sevkaretsi Sako.

== Gallery ==
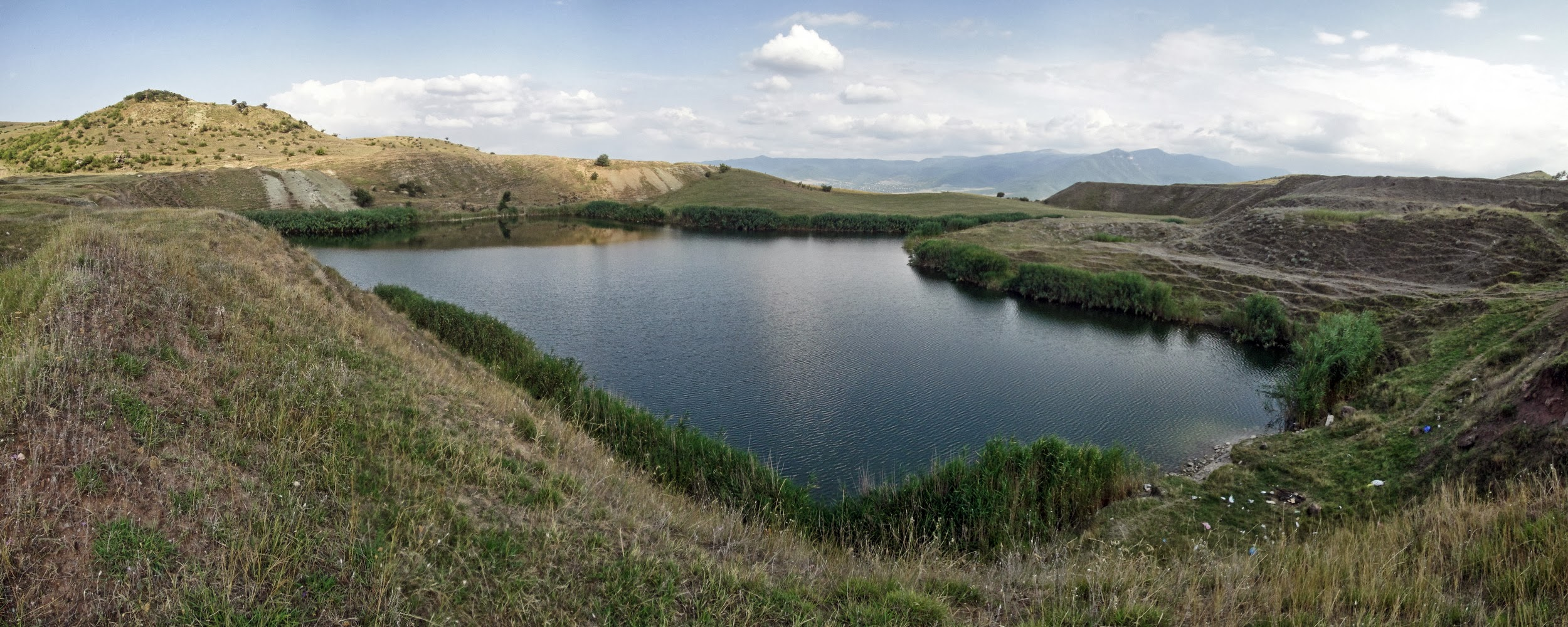
Lake near Sevkar
