= Qarah Dash, West Azerbaijan =

Qarah Dash قره داش
- Village
- Country: Iran
- Province: West Azerbaijan
- County: Khoy
- Bakhsh: Central
- Rural District: Firuraq

Population (2006)
  - Total: 34
- Time zone: UTC+3:30 (IRST)
  - Summer (DST): UTC+4:30 (IRDT)

Qarah Dash (Persian: قره داش, also Romanized as Qarah Dāsh) is a village in Firuraq Rural District, in the Central District of Khoy County, West Azerbaijan Province, Iran. At the 2006 census, its population was 34, in 8 families.
