= Qaqazan-e Sharqi Rural District =

Rural district in Qazvin province, Iran

Qaqazan-e Sharqi Rural District Persian: دهستان قاقازان شرقي
- Rural District
- Location within Iran
- Coordinates: 36°12′N 49°43′E
- Country: Iran
- Province: Qazvin
- County: Takestan
- District: Central
- Established: 1987
- Capital: Yahyaabad

Population (2016)
  - Total: 12,887
- Time zone: UTC+3:30 (IRST)

Qaqazan-e Sharqi Rural District (Persian: دهستان قاقازان شرقي) is in the Central District of Takestan County, Qazvin province, Iran. Its capital is the village of Yahyaabad.

== Demographics ==
=== Population ===
At the time of the 2006 National Census, the rural district's population was 12,890 in 2,930 households. There were 12,294 inhabitants in 3,463 households at the following census of 2011. The 2016 census measured the population of the rural district as 12,887 in 3,878 households. The most populous of its 21 villages was Yahyaabad, with 3,060 people.

=== Other villages in the rural district ===
- Ashtajin
- Daghlan
- Dastjerd
- Dowlatabad
- Khvorhesht
- Kondor
- Mehdiabad
- Qomik-e Bozorg
- Shirazak
