= Qaqazan-e Gharbi Rural District =

Rural district in Qazvin province, Iran

Qaqazan-e Gharbi Rural District Persian: دهستان قاقازان غربي
- Rural District
- Location within Iran
- Coordinates: 36°16′N 49°32′E
- Country: Iran
- Province: Qazvin
- County: Takestan
- District: Central
- Established: 1987
- Capital: Nikuyeh

Population (2016)
  - Total: 4,412
- Time zone: UTC+3:30 (IRST)

Qaqazan-e Gharbi Rural District (Persian: دهستان قاقازان غربي) is in the Central District of Takestan County, Qazvin province, Iran. Its capital is the village of Nikuyeh.

== Demographics ==
=== Population ===
At the time of the 2006 National Census, the rural district's population was 7,332 in 1,805 households. There were 6,057 inhabitants in 1,822 households at the following census of 2011. The 2016 census measured the population of the rural district as 4,412 in 1,403 households. The most populous of its 22 villages was Kaneshkin, with 976 people.

=== Other villages in the rural district ===
- Andaq
- Darbahan
- Meshkin
- Qalat
- Saras
- Shenasvand
- Takand
- Yazdeh Rud
