= Afshariyeh Rural District =

Rural district in Qazvin province, Iran

Afshariyeh Rural District Persian: دهستان افشاريه
- Rural District
- Location within Iran
- Coordinates: 35°47′N 49°35′E
- Country: Iran
- Province: Qazvin
- County: Takestan
- District: Khorramdasht
- Established: 1987
- Capital: Rahimabad

Population (2016)
  - Total: 7,262
- Time zone: UTC+3:30 (IRST)

Afshariyeh Rural District (Persian: دهستان افشاريه) is in Khorramdasht District of Takestan County, Qazvin province, Iran. Its capital is the village of Rahimabad.

== Demographics ==
=== Population ===
At the time of the 2006 National Census, the rural district's population was 8,549 in 2,173 households. There were 7,947 inhabitants in 2,322 households at the following census of 2011. The 2016 census measured the population of the rural district as 7,262 in 2,379 households. The most populous of its 19 villages was Owrazjin, with 1,244 people.

=== Other villages in the rural district ===
- Barzaljin
- Jafarabad
- Kashmarz
- Shanastaq-e Olya
- Shanastaq-e Sofla
- Shizand
- Sinak
- Tarvizak
