= Khorramdasht District =

District in Qazvin province, Iran

Khorramdasht District Persian: بخش خرمدشت
- District
- Location within Iran
- Coordinates: 35°50′N 49°35′E
- Country: Iran
- Province: Qazvin
- County: Takestan
- Established: 1995
- Capital: Khorramdasht

Population (2016)
  - Total: 20,661
- Time zone: UTC+3:30 (IRST)

Khorramdasht District (Persian: بخش خرمدشت) is in Takestan County, Qazvin province, Iran. Its capital is the city of Khorramdasht. (Note: Formerly the village of Nahavand)

== Demographics ==
=== Population ===
At the time of the 2006 National Census, the district's population was 21,685 in 5,601 households. The following census in 2011 counted 21,910 people in 6,393 households. The 2016 census measured the population of the district as 20,661 inhabitants in 6,520 households.

=== Administrative divisions ===
Khorramdasht District Population
Administrative Divisions	2006	2011	2016
Afshariyeh RD	8,549	7,947	7,262
Ramand-e Shomali RD	6,944	7,238	6,845
Khorramdasht (city)	6,192	6,725	6,554
Total	21,685	21,910	20,661
RD = Rural District
