= Central District (Takestan County) =

District in Qazvin province, Iran

Central District (Takestan County) Persian: بخش مرکزی شهرستان تاکستان
- District
- Location within Iran
- Coordinates: 36°08′N 49°39′E
- Country: Iran
- Province: Qazvin
- County: Takestan
- Capital: Takestan

Population (2016)
  - Total: 103,757
- Time zone: UTC+3:30 (IRST)

The Central District of Takestan County (Persian: بخش مرکزی شهرستان تاکستان) is in Qazvin province, Iran. Its capital is the city of Takestan.

== Demographics ==
=== Population ===
At the time of the 2006 National Census, the district's population was 99,841 in 24,971 households. The following census in 2011 counted 102,401 people in 29,917 households. The 2016 census measured the population of the district as 103,757 inhabitants in 31,720 households.

=== Administrative divisions ===
Central District (Takestan County) Population
Administrative Divisions	2006	2011	2016
Narjeh RD	923	739	555
Qaqazan-e Gharbi RD	7,332	6,057	4,412
Qaqazan-e Sharqi RD	12,890	12,294	12,887
Narjeh (city)	5,071	5,404	5,604
Takestan (city)	73,625	77,907	80,299
Total	99,841	102,401	103,757
RD = Rural District
