= Takestan County =

County in Qazvin province, Iran

Takestan County Persian: شهرستان تاکستان
- County
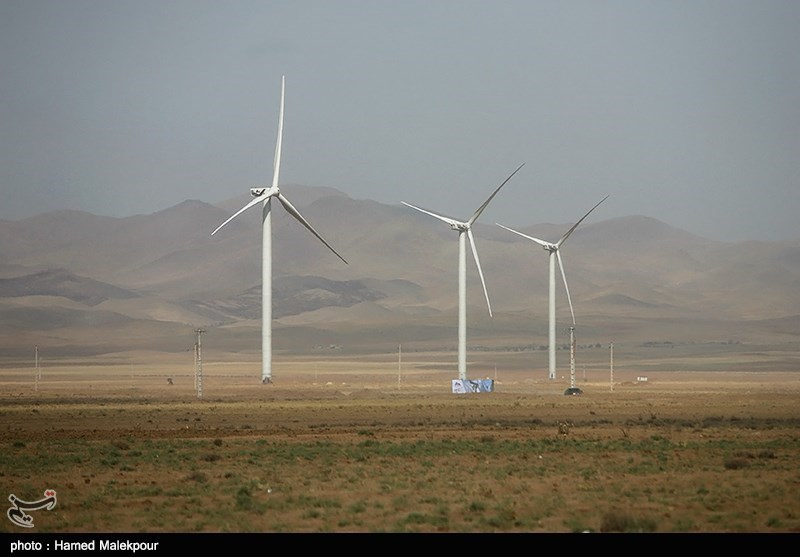
- Qazvin Kahak Wind Farm in Takestan County

- Location of Takestan County in Qazvin province (left, green)

- Location of Qazvin province in Iran
- Coordinates: 36°01′N 49°30′E
- Country: Iran
- Province: Qazvin
- Established: 1980
- Capital: Takestan
- Districts: Central, Esfarvarin, Khorramdasht, Ziaabad

Population (2016)
  - Total: 172,636
- Time zone: UTC+3:30 (IRST)

Takestan County (Persian: شهرستان تاکستان) (Note: Also romanized as Shahrestan-e Takestan; Tati: Šareston-e Tâkestân) is in Qazvin province, Iran. Its capital is the city of Takestan.

== Demographics ==
=== Language and ethnicity ===
According to the 2016 national census, the population of this county was 80,299. Takestan County is represented in the Islamic Consultative Assembly (Parliament of Iran). The common languages in this county are Azerbaijani and Tati.

=== Population ===
At the time of the 2006 National Census, the county's population was 171,520 in 42,969 households. The following census in 2011 counted 172,949 people in 50,247 households. The 2016 census measured the population of the county as 172,636 in 52,917 households.

=== Administrative divisions ===
Takestan County's population history and administrative structure over three consecutive censuses are shown in the following table.

Takestan County Population
Administrative Divisions	2006	2011	2016
Central District	99,841	102,401	103,757
Narjeh RD	923	739	555
Qaqazan-e Gharbi RD	7,332	6,057	4,412
Qaqazan-e Sharqi RD	12,890	12,294	12,887
Narjeh (city)	5,071	5,404	5,604
Takestan (city)	73,625	77,907	80,299
Esfarvarin District	28,845	29,106	29,300
Ak RD	10,282	9,880	10,320
Khorramabad RD	6,459	6,611	6,609
Esfarvarin (city)	12,104	12,615	12,371
Khorramdasht District	21,685	21,910	20,661
Afshariyeh RD	8,549	7,947	7,262
Ramand-e Shomali RD	6,944	7,238	6,845
Khorramdasht (city) (Note: Formerly the village of Nahavand)	6,192	6,725	6,554
Ziaabad District	21,149	19,532	18,918
Dodangeh-ye Olya RD	6,002	4,898	5,061
Dodangeh-ye Sofla RD	6,762	5,997	5,595
Ziaabad (city)	8,385	8,637	8,262
Total	171,520	172,949	172,636
RD = Rural District

== See also ==
Media related to Takestan County at Wikimedia Commons
