= Qaziabad =

Qaziabad (Persian: قاضي اباد) may refer to:

- Qaziabad, Fars
- Qaziabad, Kerman
- Qaziabad, Andika, Khuzestan Province
- Qaziabad, Ramhormoz, Khuzestan Province
- Qaziabad, Azna, Lorestan Province
- Qaziabad, Dorud, Lorestan Province
- Qaziabad, West Azerbaijan
- Qaziabad, Zanjan
