= Morshedi =

Morshedi مرشدي
- Village
- Location within Iran
- Coordinates: 30°19′34″N 53°49′00″E
- Country: Iran
- Province: Fars
- County: Bavanat
- Bakhsh: Central
- Rural District: Mazayjan

Population (2006)
  - Total: 636
- Time zone: UTC+3:30 (IRST)
  - Summer (DST): UTC+4:30 (IRDT)

Morshedi (Persian: مرشدي, also Romanized as Morshedī; also known as Murshidi) is a village in Mazayjan Rural District, in the Central District of Bavanat County, Fars province, Iran. At the 2006 census, its population was 636, in 158 families.
