= Sarvestan (disambiguation) =

Sarvestan is a city in Fars Province, Iran.

Sarvestan (Persian: سروستان) may also refer to these places in Iran:

- Sarvestan, Bushehr
- Sarvestan, Bavanat, Fars Province
- Sarvestan, Bam, Kerman Province
- Sarvestan County, in Fars Province
- Sarvestan Palace, in Fars Province
- Sarvestan Rural District (disambiguation), in Fars Province
