= Do Rah =

Do Rah دوراه
- Village
- Location within Iran
- Coordinates: 30°23′39″N 53°30′18″E
- Country: Iran
- Province: Fars
- County: Bavanat
- Bakhsh: Central
- Rural District: Simakan

Population (2006)
  - Total: 233
- Time zone: UTC+3:30 (IRST)
  - Summer (DST): UTC+4:30 (IRDT)

Do Rah (Persian: دوراه, also Romanized as Do Rāh) is a village in Simakan Rural District, in the Central District of Bavanat County, Fars province, Iran. At the 2006 census, its population was 233, in 57 families.
