= Juy Sefid =

Juy Sefid جوي سفيد
- Village
- Location within Iran
- Coordinates: 30°31′15″N 53°30′39″E
- Country: Iran
- Province: Fars
- County: Bavanat
- Bakhsh: Central
- Rural District: Baghestan

Population (2006)
  - Total: 365
- Time zone: UTC+3:30 (IRST)
  - Summer (DST): UTC+4:30 (IRDT)

Juy Sefid (Persian: جوي سفيد, also Romanized as Jūy Sefīd; also known as Jūb-e Sefīd, Jūb Sefīd, and Jūk-i-Sefīd) is a village in Baghestan Rural District, in the Central District of Bavanat County, Fars province, Iran. At the 2006 census, its population was 365, in 83 families.
