= Loqman Cheshmeh =

Loqman Cheshmeh لقمان چشمه
- Village
- Location within Iran
- Coordinates: 30°23′32″N 53°32′10″E
- Country: Iran
- Province: Fars
- County: Bavanat
- Bakhsh: Central
- Rural District: Simakan

Population (2006)
  - Total: 34
- Time zone: UTC+3:30 (IRST)
  - Summer (DST): UTC+4:30 (IRDT)

Loqman Cheshmeh (Persian: لقمان چشمه, also Romanized as Loqmān Cheshmeh) is a village in Simakan Rural District, in the Central District of Bavanat County, Fars province, Iran. At the 2006 census, its population was 34, in 7 families.
