= Qaleh Meseh =

Qaleh Meseh قلعه مسه
- Village
- Location within Iran
- Coordinates: 30°25′11″N 53°27′17″E
- Country: Iran
- Province: Fars
- County: Bavanat
- Bakhsh: Central
- Rural District: Simakan

Population (2006)
  - Total: 93
- Time zone: UTC+3:30 (IRST)
  - Summer (DST): UTC+4:30 (IRDT)

Qaleh Meseh (Persian: قلعه مسه, also Romanized as Qal‘eh Meseh; also known as Qal‘eh Mes) is a village in Simakan Rural District, in the Central District of Bavanat County, Fars province, Iran. At the 2006 census, its population was 93, in 23 families.
