= Sevenj, Fars =

Sevenj سونج
- Village
- Location within Iran
- Coordinates: 30°21′54″N 53°50′12″E
- Country: Iran
- Province: Fars
- County: Bavanat
- Bakhsh: Central
- Rural District: Sarvestan

Population (2006)
  - Total: 139
- Time zone: UTC+3:30 (IRST)
  - Summer (DST): UTC+4:30 (IRDT)

Sevenj (Persian: سونج; also known as Sevinj) is a village in Sarvestan Rural District, in the Central District of Bavanat County, Fars province, Iran. At the 2006 census, its population was 139, in 36 families.
