= Qabr-e Sefid =

Qabr-e Sefid قبرسفيد
- Village
- Location within Iran
- Coordinates: 30°32′24″N 53°27′00″E
- Country: Iran
- Province: Fars
- County: Bavanat
- Bakhsh: Central
- Rural District: Baghestan

Population (2006)
  - Total: 13
- Time zone: UTC+3:30 (IRST)
  - Summer (DST): UTC+4:30 (IRDT)

Qabr-e Sefid (Persian: قبرسفيد, also Romanized as Qabr-e Sefīd) is a village in Baghestan Rural District, in the Central District of Bavanat County, Fars province, Iran. At the 2006 census, its population was 13, in 5 families.
