= Sheydan, Bavanat =

Sheydan شيدان
- Village
- Location within Iran
- Coordinates: 30°23′28″N 53°46′06″E
- Country: Iran
- Province: Fars
- County: Bavanat
- Bakhsh: Central
- Rural District: Sarvestan

Population (2006)
  - Total: 499
- Time zone: UTC+3:30 (IRST)
  - Summer (DST): UTC+4:30 (IRDT)

Sheydan (Persian: شيدان, also Romanized as Sheydān and Shīdān; also known as Shāhidān) is a village in Sarvestan Rural District, in the Central District of Bavanat County, Fars province, Iran. At the 2006 census, its population was 499, in 146 families.
