= Rizakan =

Rizakan ريزكان
- Village
- Location within Iran
- Coordinates: 30°21′29″N 53°52′18″E
- Country: Iran
- Province: Fars
- County: Bavanat
- Bakhsh: Central
- Rural District: Sarvestan

Population (2006)
  - Total: 149
- Time zone: UTC+3:30 (IRST)
  - Summer (DST): UTC+4:30 (IRDT)

Rizakan (Persian: ريزكان, also Romanized as Rīzakān and Rīz Kān; also known as Rezā Kān and Rīzahkān) is a village in Sarvestan Rural District, in the Central District of Bavanat County, Fars province, Iran. At the 2006 census, its population was 149, in 39 families.
