= Qadamgah, Bavanat =

Qadamgah قدمگاه
- Village
- Location within Iran
- Coordinates: 30°20′39″N 53°49′39″E
- Country: Iran
- Province: Fars
- County: Bavanat
- Bakhsh: Central
- Rural District: Mazayjan

Population (2006)
  - Total: 86
- Time zone: UTC+3:30 (IRST)
  - Summer (DST): UTC+4:30 (IRDT)

Qadamgah (Persian: قدمگاه, also Romanized as Qadamgāh) is a village in Mazayjan Rural District, in the Central District of Bavanat County, Fars province, Iran. At the 2006 census, its population was 86, in 25 families.
