= Dasht-e Khowrdeh =

Dasht-e Khowrdeh دشت خورده
- Village
- Location within Iran
- Coordinates: 30°21′43″N 53°49′55″E
- Country: Iran
- Province: Fars
- County: Bavanat
- Bakhsh: Central
- Rural District: Sarvestan

Population (2006)
  - Total: 45
- Time zone: UTC+3:30 (IRST)
  - Summer (DST): UTC+4:30 (IRDT)

Dasht-e Khowrdeh (Persian: دشت خورده; also known as Dasht-e Kharzeh) is a village in Sarvestan Rural District, in the Central District of Bavanat County, Fars province, Iran. At the 2006 census, its population was 45, in 11 families.
