= Emamzadeh Bazm =

Emamzadeh Bazm امامزاده بزم
- Village
- Location within Iran
- Coordinates: 30°22′18″N 53°47′49″E
- Country: Iran
- Province: Fars
- County: Bavanat
- Bakhsh: Central
- Rural District: Sarvestan

Population (2006)
  - Total: 68
- Time zone: UTC+3:30 (IRST)
  - Summer (DST): UTC+4:30 (IRDT)

Emamzadeh Bazm (Persian: امامزاده بزم, also Romanized as Emāmzādeh Bazm and Emāmzādehbazm) is a village in Sarvestan Rural District, in the Central District of Bavanat County, Fars province, Iran. At the 2006 census, its population was 68, in 20 families.
