= Asemi =

Asemi عاصمي
- Village
- Location within Iran
- Coordinates: 30°20′21″N 53°49′09″E
- Country: Iran
- Province: Fars
- County: Bavanat
- Bakhsh: Central
- Rural District: Mazayjan

Population (2006)
  - Total: 114
- Time zone: UTC+3:30 (IRST)
  - Summer (DST): UTC+4:30 (IRDT)

Asemi (Persian: عاصمي, also Romanized as 'Āşemī) is a village in Mazayjan Rural District, in the Central District of Bavanat County, Fars province, Iran. At the 2006 census, its population was 114, in 36 families.
