= Qaleh-ye Abadeh =

Qaleh-ye Abadeh قلعه اباده
- Village
- Location within Iran
- Coordinates: 30°20′02″N 53°48′50″E
- Country: Iran
- Province: Fars
- County: Bavanat
- Bakhsh: Central
- Rural District: Mazayjan

Population (2006)
  - Total: 244
- Time zone: UTC+3:30 (IRST)
  - Summer (DST): UTC+4:30 (IRDT)

Qaleh-ye Abadeh (Persian: قلعه اباده, also Romanized as Qal‘eh-ye Ābādeh and Qal‘eh Ābādeh; also known as Ābādeh and Ābādeh-ye Morshedī) is a village in Mazayjan Rural District, in the Central District of Bavanat County, Fars province, Iran. At the 2006 census, its population was 244, in 69 families.
