= Fenjan, Fars =

Fenjan فنجان
- Village
- Location within Iran
- Coordinates: 30°23′21″N 53°29′24″E
- Country: Iran
- Province: Fars
- County: Bavanat
- Bakhsh: Central

Population (2006)
  - Total: 419
- Time zone: UTC+3:30 (IRST)
  - Summer (DST): UTC+4:30 (IRDT)

Fenjan (Persian: فنجان, also Romanized as Fenjān) is a village in Simakan Rural District, in the Central District of Bavanat County, Fars province, Iran. At the 2006 census, its population was 419, in 116 families.
