= Chenar Sukhteh, Bavanat =

Chenar Sukhteh چنارسوخته
- Village
- Location within Iran
- Coordinates: 30°15′03″N 53°50′46″E
- Country: Iran
- Province: Fars
- County: Bavanat
- Bakhsh: Central
- Rural District: Mazayjan

Population (2006)
  - Total: 142
- Time zone: UTC+3:30 (IRST)
  - Summer (DST): UTC+4:30 (IRDT)

Chenar Sukhteh (Persian: چنارسوخته, also Romanized as Chenār Sūkhteh) is a village in Mazayjan Rural District, in the Central District of Bavanat County, Fars province, Iran. At the 2006 census, its population was 142, in 34 families.
