= Badbar =

Village in Fars province, Iran

Badbar Persian: بادبر
- Village
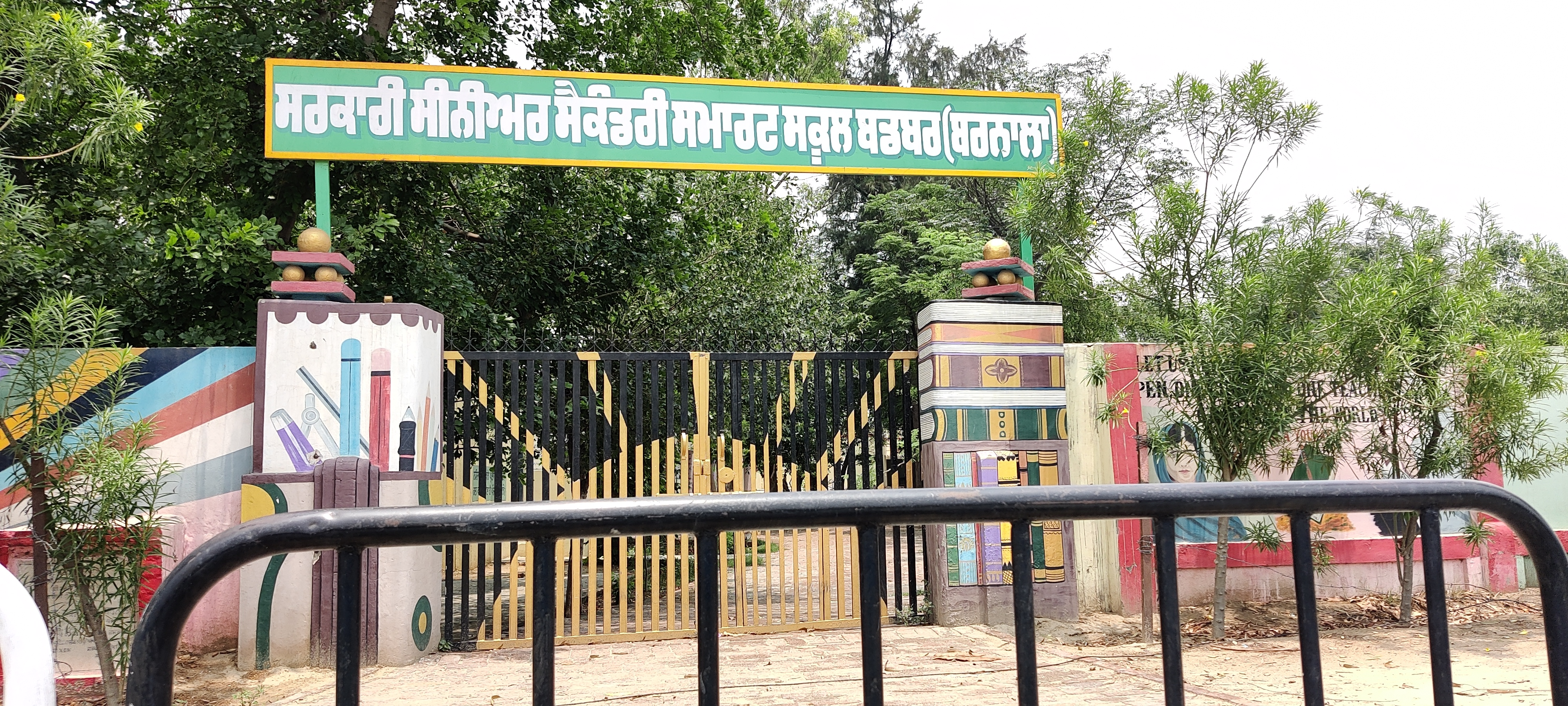
- Entrance of Govt. Senior Secondary School Badbar (Barnala)

- Location within Iran
- Coordinates: 30°17′58″N 53°45′52″E
- Country: Iran
- Province: Fars
- County: Bavanat
- District: Mazayjan
- Rural District: Mazayjan

Population (2016)
  - Total: 844
- Time zone: UTC+3:30 (IRST)

Badbar (Persian: بادبر) (Note: Also romanized as Bādbar and Bādbār; also known as Bādvar and Bādvra) is a village in Mazayjan Rural District of Mazayjan District, Bavanat County, Fars province, Iran.

== Demographics ==
=== Population ===
At the time of the 2006 National Census, the village's population was 570 in 154 households, when it was in the Central District. The following census in 2011 counted 618 people in 191 households, by which time the rural district had been separated from the district in the formation of Mazayjan District. The 2016 census measured the population of the village as 844 people in 262 households. It was the most populous village in its rural district.
