= Juy Bazm =

Juy Bazm جوي بزم
- Village
- Location within Iran
- Coordinates: 30°23′05″N 53°46′35″E
- Country: Iran
- Province: Fars
- County: Bavanat
- Bakhsh: Central
- Rural District: Sarvestan

Population (2006)
  - Total: 84
- Time zone: UTC+3:30 (IRST)
  - Summer (DST): UTC+4:30 (IRDT)

Juy Bazm (Persian: جوي بزم, also Romanized as Jūy Bazm; also known as Jūb Bazm, Ju-i-Bāz, and Khūy Bazm) is a village in Sarvestan Rural District, in the Central District of Bavanat County, Fars province, Iran. At the 2006 census, its population was 84, in 25 families.
