= Khvorkosh =

Khvorkosh خوركش
- Village
- Location within Iran
- Coordinates: 30°23′39″N 53°21′59″E
- Country: Iran
- Province: Fars
- County: Bavanat
- Bakhsh: Central
- Rural District: Simakan

Population (2006)
  - Total: 247
- Time zone: UTC+3:30 (IRST)
  - Summer (DST): UTC+4:30 (IRDT)

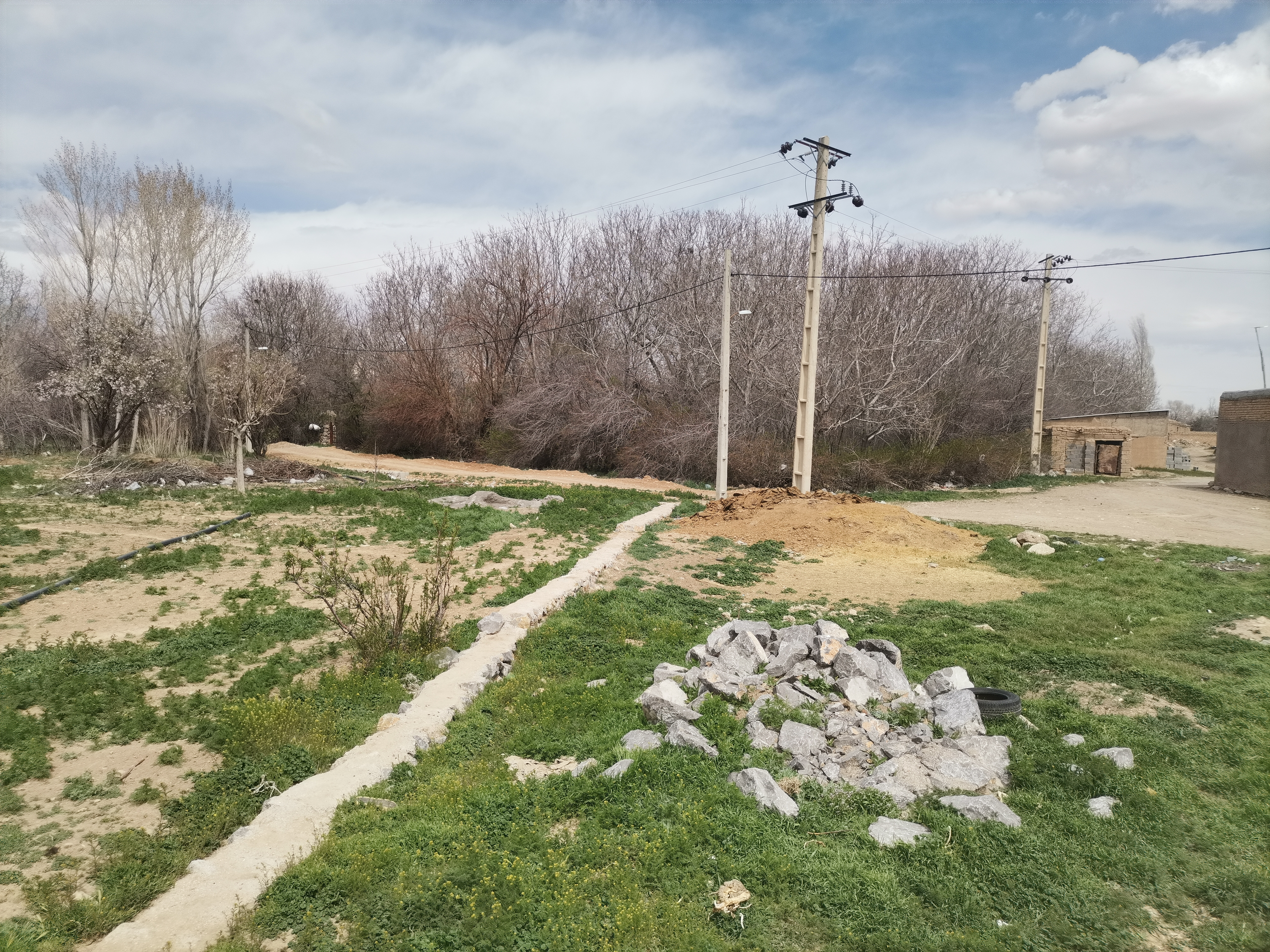

Khvorkosh (Persian: خوركش, also Romanized as Khowrkosh) is a village in Simakan Rural District, in the Central District of Bavanat County, Fars province, Iran. At the 2006 census, its population was 247, in 67 families.
