= Dideh Banki =

Dideh Banki ديده بانكي
- Village
- Location within Iran
- Coordinates: 30°31′15″N 53°31′06″E
- Country: Iran
- Province: Fars
- County: Bavanat
- Bakhsh: Central
- Rural District: Baghestan

Population (2006)
  - Total: 293
- Time zone: UTC+3:30 (IRST)
  - Summer (DST): UTC+4:30 (IRDT)

Dideh Banki (Persian: ديده بانكي, also Romanized as Dīdeh Bānkī; also known as Dīdābungi, Dīdeh Bāngī, Kalāt-e Dīdeh Būngī, and Kalāt-e Dīdeh Būnjī) is a village in Baghestan Rural District, in the Central District of Bavanat County, Fars province, Iran. At the 2006 census, its population was 293, in 76 families.
