= Somar Jan =

Somar Jan سمارجان
- Village
- Location within Iran
- Coordinates: 30°23′16″N 53°30′07″E
- Country: Iran
- Province: Fars
- County: Bavanat
- Bakhsh: Central
- Rural District: Simakan

Population (2006)
  - Total: 174
- Time zone: UTC+3:30 (IRST)
  - Summer (DST): UTC+4:30 (IRDT)

Somar Jan (Persian: سمارجان, also Romanized as Somār Jān; also known as Somād Jān) is a village in Simakan Rural District, in the Central District of Bavanat County, Fars province, Iran. As of the 2006 census, its population was 174, in 40 families.
