= Mahalleh-ye Akbari =

Mahalleh-ye Akbari محله اكبري
- Village
- Location within Iran
- Coordinates: 30°20′10″N 53°49′13″E
- Country: Iran
- Province: Fars
- County: Bavanat
- Bakhsh: Central
- Rural District: Mazayjan

Population (2006)
  - Total: 327
- Time zone: UTC+3:30 (IRST)
  - Summer (DST): UTC+4:30 (IRDT)

Mahalleh-ye Akbari (Persian: محله اكبري, also Romanized as Maḩalleh-ye Akbarī; also known as Akbarī) is a village in Mazayjan Rural District, in the Central District of Bavanat County, Fars province, Iran. At the 2006 census, its population was 327, in 85 families.
