= Qaziabad, Fars =

Qaziabad قاضي اباد
- Village
- Location within Iran
- Coordinates: 30°24′05″N 53°44′21″E
- Country: Iran
- Province: Fars
- County: Bavanat
- Bakhsh: Central
- Rural District: Sarvestan

Population (2006)
  - Total: 227
- Time zone: UTC+3:30 (IRST)
  - Summer (DST): UTC+4:30 (IRDT)

Qaziabad (Persian: قاضي اباد, also Romanized as Qāẕīābād and Qāzīābād) is a village in Sarvestan Rural District, in the Central District of Bavanat County, Fars province, Iran. At the 2006 census, its population was 227, in 83 families.
