= Bavanat =

Bavanat may refer to:

- Bavanat, Fars, former name of Surian, a city in Bavanat County, Fars province, Iran
- Bavanat County, an administrative division of Fars province, Iran
