= Fakhrabad, Bavanat =

Village in Fars province, Iran

Fakhrabad Persian: فخراباد
- Village
- Location within Iran
- Coordinates: 30°25′15″N 53°41′43″E
- Country: Iran
- Province: Fars
- County: Bavanat
- District: Central
- Rural District: Baghestan

Population (2016)
  - Total: 1,082
- Time zone: UTC+3:30 (IRST)

Fakhrabad (Persian: فخراباد) (Note: Also romanized as Fakhrābād) is a village in Baghestan Rural District of the Central District of Bavanat County, Fars province, Iran.

== Demographics ==
=== Population ===
At the time of the 2006 National Census, the village's population was 1,074 in 288 households. The following census in 2011 counted 1,164 people in 319 households. The 2016 census measured the population of the village as 1,082 people in 341 households. It was the most populous village in its rural district.
