= Monj-e Olya =

Village in Fars province, Iran

Monj-e Olya Persian: منج عليا
- Village
- Location within Iran
- Coordinates: 30°20′51″N 53°53′48″E
- Country: Iran
- Province: Fars
- County: Bavanat
- District: Mazayjan
- Rural District: Sarvestan

Population (2016)
  - Total: 820
- Time zone: UTC+3:30 (IRST)

Monj-e Olya (Persian: منج عليا) (Note: Also romanized as Monj-e ‘Olyā; also known as Monj-e Bālā and Qal‘eh-ye Bālā) is a village in Sarvestan Rural District of Mazayjan District, Bavanat County, Fars province, Iran.

== Demographics ==
=== Population ===
At the time of the 2006 National Census, the village's population was 736 in 201 households, when it was in the Central District. The following census in 2011 counted 966 people in 255 households, by which time the rural district had been separated from the district in the establishment of Mazayjan District. The 2016 census measured the population of the village as 820 people in 262 households. It was the most populous village in its rural district.
