= Hanza =

Hanza may refer to:

- Hanza, Kerman, Anduhjerd Rural District, Shahdad District, Kerman County, Kerman province, Iran
- Hanza, Rabor, Hanza District, Rabor County, Kerman province, Iran
- Hanza District, Rabor County, Kerman province, Iran
- Hanza Rural District, Hanza District, Rabor County, Kerman province, Iran
- Hanza, Yazd, Miankuh Rural District, Central District of Mehriz County, Yazd province, Iran
- Hanza Tower, skyscraper in Szczecin, Poland
- Boscia senegalensis, a plant

== See also ==
- Hunza (disambiguation)
