= Monj-e Sofla =

Village in Fars, Iran

Monj-e Sofla منج سفلي
- Village
- Location within Iran
- Coordinates: 30°20′51″N 53°53′44″E
- Country: Iran
- Province: Fars
- County: Bavanat
- Bakhsh: Central
- Rural District: Sarvestan

Population (2006)
  - Total: 423
- Time zone: UTC+3:30 (IRST)
  - Summer (DST): UTC+4:30 (IRDT)

Monj-e Sofla (Persian: منج سفلي, also Romanized as Monj-e Soflá; also known as Monj-e Pā’īn, Mūnj, and Qal‘eh-ye Pā’īn) is a village in Sarvestan Rural District, in the Central District of Bavanat County, Fars province, Iran. At the 2006 census, its population was 423, in 121 families.
