= Jafarabad-e Sofla, Fars =

Jafarabad-e Sofla جعفرآباد سفلی
- village
- Location within Iran
- Coordinates: 30°25′42″N 53°42′22″E
- Country: Iran
- Province: Fars
- County: Bavanat
- Bakhsh: Central
- Rural District: Baghestan

Population (2006)
  - Total: 156
- Time zone: UTC+3:30 (IRST)
  - Summer (DST): UTC+4:30 (IRDT)

Jafarabad-e Sofla (Persian: جعفرآباد سفلی, also Romanized as Ja‘farābād-e Soflá; also known as Ja‘farābād-e Pā’īn, Ja‘farābād-e Seyyed, and Ja‘farābad Payin) is a village in Baghestan Rural District, in the Central District of Bavanat County, Fars province, Iran. At the 2006 census, its population was 156, in 35 families.
