= Jeshnian =

Jeshnian or Jeshneyan or Jashneyan or Jesniyan or Joshnian (Persian: جشنيان) may refer to:

- Jeshnian, Bavanat
- Jeshnian, Marvdasht
