= Hunza, Iran =

Hunza هونزا
- Village
- Location within Iran
- Coordinates: 30°23′33″N 53°21′42″E
- Country: Iran
- Province: Fars
- County: Bavanat
- Bakhsh: Central
- Rural District: Simakan

Population (2006)
  - Total: 194
- Time zone: UTC+3:30 (IRST)
  - Summer (DST): UTC+4:30 (IRDT)

Hunza (Persian: هونزا, also Romanized as Hūnzā; also known as Khūnzā) is a village in Simakan Rural District, in the Central District of Bavanat County, Fars province, Iran. At the 2006 census, its population was 194, in 38 families.
