= Mazayjan =

Mazayjan or Mazayejan (Persian: مزايجان) may refer to:

- Mazayjan, Bavanat
- Mazayjan, Zarrin Dasht
- Mazayjan Rural District, in Bavanat County
