= Sangbar =

Sangbar or Sang Bor or Sangbor (Persian: سنگبر) may refer to:

- Sangbor, Afghanistan
- Sangbor, Fars, Iran
- Sangbar, Dargaz, Razavi Khorasan Province, Iran
- Sangbar, Mashhad, Razavi Khorasan Province, Iran
