= B. salicifolia =

B. salicifolia may refer to:

- Baccharis salicifolia, a flowering shrub species native to the desert southwest of the United States and northern Mexico
- Boscia salicifolia, Oliv., 1868, a plant species in the genus Boscia

== See also ==
- Salicifolia (disambiguation)
