= Qanat-e Malek, Fars =

Qanat-e Malek قنات ملك
- Village
- Location within Iran
- Coordinates: 30°30′17″N 53°32′23″E
- Country: Iran
- Province: Fars
- County: Bavanat
- Bakhsh: Central
- Rural District: Baghestan

Population (2006)
  - Total: 252
- Time zone: UTC+3:30 (IRST)
  - Summer (DST): UTC+4:30 (IRDT)

Qanat-e Malek (Persian: قنات ملك, also Romanized as Qanāt-e Malek; also known as Qanāt-i-Malik) is a village in Baghestan Rural District, in the Central District of Bavanat County, Fars province, Iran. At the 2006 census, its population was 252, in 69 families.
