= Sarvestan, Bavanat =

Village in Fars province, Iran

Sarvestan Persian: سروستان
- Village
- Location within Iran
- Coordinates: 30°22′18″N 53°50′04″E
- Country: Iran
- Province: Fars
- County: Bavanat
- District: Mazayjan
- Rural District: Sarvestan

Population (2016)
  - Total: 442
- Time zone: UTC+3:30 (IRST)

Sarvestan (Persian: سروستان) (Note: Also romanized as Sarvestān; also known as Salvestān and Sarvīstān) is a village in, and the capital of, Sarvestan Rural District of Mazayjan District, Bavanat County, Fars province, Iran.

== Demographics ==
=== Population ===
At the time of the 2006 National Census, the village's population was 431 in 126 households, when it was in the Central District. The following census in 2011 counted 376 people in 128 households, by which time the rural district had been separated from the district in the formation of Mazayjan District. The 2016 census measured the population of the village as 442 people in 147 households.
