= Bazm, Fars =

Bazm, Iran بزم
- Village
- Location within Iran
- Coordinates: 30°22′38″N 53°47′57″E
- Country: Iran
- Province: Fars
- County: Bavanat
- Bakhsh: Central
- Rural District: Sarvestan

Population (2006)
  - Total: 422
- Time zone: UTC+3:30 (IRST)
  - Summer (DST): UTC+4:30 (IRDT)

Bazm (Persian: بزم; also known as Bāz) is a village in Sarvestan Rural District, in the Central District of Bavanat County, Fars province, Iran. At the 2006 census, its population was 422, in 111 families.
