= Simakan =

Village in Fars province, Iran

Simakan Persian: سیمکان
- Village
- Location within Iran
- Coordinates: 30°25′17″N 53°26′39″E
- Country: Iran
- Province: Fars
- County: Bavanat
- District: Central
- Rural District: Simakan

Population (2016)
  - Total: 410
- Time zone: UTC+3:30 (IRST)

Simakan (Persian: سيمكان) (Note: Also romanized as Sīmakān; also known as Sīmākand and Sīmaqān) is a village in, and the capital of, Simakan Rural District of the Central District of Bavanat County, Fars province, Iran.

== Demographics ==
=== Population ===
At the time of the 2006 National Census, the village's population was 410 in 114 households. The following census in 2011 counted 445 people in 146 households. The 2016 census measured the population of the village as 410 people in 145 households. It was the most populous village in its rural district.
