= Qanat-e Malek =

Qanat-e Malek (Persian: قنات ملك), also rendered as Qanat-i-Malik, may refer to:

- Qanat-e Malek, Fars
- Qanat-e Malek, Kerman
