= Bazm =

Bazm (Persian: بزم) may refer to:

Mehfil, a place for recreational activities in South Asia.

For the places see:

- Bazm, Fars
- Bazm, Isfahan
