= Bazm Castle =

Castle in Fars province, Iran

Bazm castle
- قلعه بزم
- Interactive map of the Bazm castle area

General information
- Type: Castle
- Location: Bavanat County, Iran

Bazm castle (Persian: قلعه بزم) is a historical castle located in Bavanat County in Fars province; the longevity of this fortress dates back to the Late centuries of post-Islamic historical periods.
