= Hunza =

Hunza may refer to:

- Hunza Valley, an area in the Gilgit-Baltistan region of Pakistan
  - Hunza (princely state), a former principality
  - Hunza District, a district
  - Hunza River, a waterway
  - Hunza Peak, a mountain
  - Hunza people, also known as Burusho, the inhabitants of the valley
  - Hunza, a variety of the Burushaski language
  - Upper Hunza, another name for Gojal, in upper reaches of the valley
  - Lower Hunza, another name for Shinaki, in lower reaches of the valley
- Hunza, Iran
- Pre-Columbian name of Tunja, a city in Colombia

== See also ==
- Hanza (disambiguation)
- Naltar Valley
