= Qaleh-ye Pain =

Qaleh-ye Pain (Persian: قلعه پائين) may refer to:

- Qaleh-ye Pain, Bavanat
- Qaleh-ye Pain, Marvdasht
- Qaleh-ye Pain Baram
- Qaleh-ye Pain Deh Shah
