= Jeshnian, Bavanat =

Village in Fars province, Iran

Jeshnian Persian: جشنيان
- Village
- Location within Iran
- Coordinates: 30°30′12″N 53°31′28″E
- Country: Iran
- Province: Fars
- County: Bavanat
- District: Central
- Rural District: Baghestan

Population (2016)
  - Total: 988
- Time zone: UTC+3:30 (IRST)

Jeshnian (Persian: جشنيان) (Note: Also romanized as Jeshneyān, Jeshnīān, Jeshnīyān, and Joshnīān; also known as Jushnūn) is a village in, and the capital of, Baghestan Rural District of the Central District of Bavanat County, Fars province, Iran.

== Demographics ==
=== Population ===
At the time of the 2006 National Census, the village's population was 694 in 195 households. The following census in 2011 counted 695 people in 219 households. The 2016 census measured the population of the village as 988 people in 330 households.
