= Monj-e Bala =

Monj-e Bala or Monj Bala (Persian: منج بالا) may refer to:

- Monj-e Bala, Fars
- Monj-e Bala, Chaharmahal and Bakhtiari
