= Jafarabad-e Pain =

Jafarabad-e Pain or Jafarabad Payin (Persian: جعفرابادپائین) may refer to:

- Jafarabad-e Pain, Fars
- Jafarabad-e Pain, Isfahan
- Jafarabad-e Pain, North Khorasan
