= Simakan Castle =

Castle in Fars province, Iran

Simakan castle
- قلعه سیمکان

General information
- Type: Castle
- Location: Bavanat County, Iran

Simakan castle (Persian: قلعه سیمکان) is a historical castle located in Bavanat County in Fars province, The longevity of this fortress dates back to the Qajar dynasty.
