= Boscia arabica =

Conservation status
- Vulnerable (IUCN 2.3)

Scientific classification
- Kingdom: Plantae
- Clade: Tracheophytes
- Clade: Angiosperms
- Clade: Eudicots
- Clade: Rosids
- Order: Brassicales
- Family: Capparaceae
- Genus: Boscia
- Species: B. arabica

Binomial name
- Boscia arabica Pestal.

Species of flowering plant

Boscia arabica is a species of flowering plant in the Capparaceae family. It is a shrub or tree native to Oman and Yemen. It is threatened by habitat loss.
