= Sarvestan Rural District =

Sarvestan Rural District (Persian: دهستان سروستان) may refer to:

- Sarvestan Rural District (Bavanat County)
- Sarvestan Rural District (Sarvestan County)
