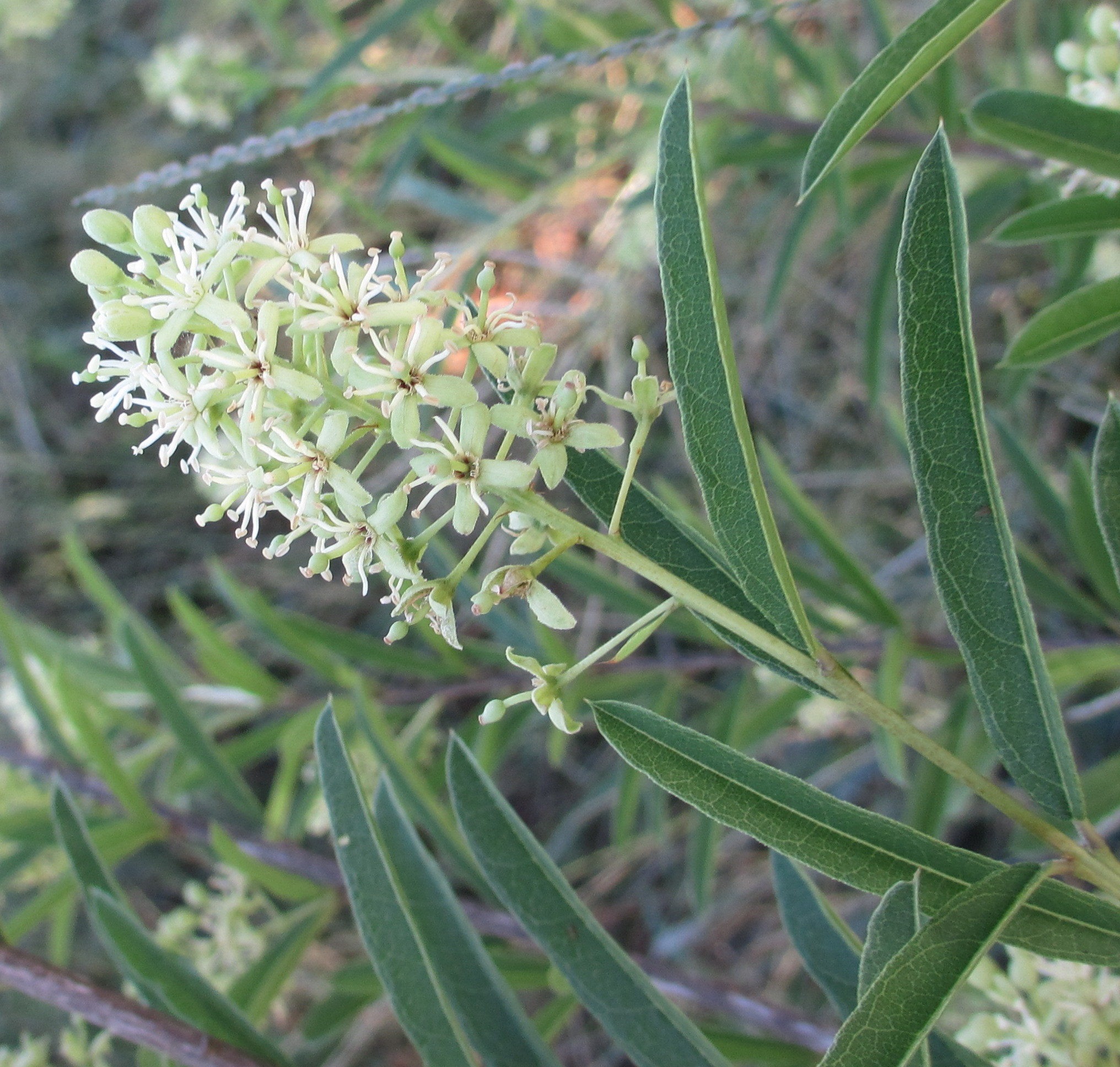

Scientific classification
- Kingdom: Plantae
- Clade: Tracheophytes
- Clade: Angiosperms
- Clade: Eudicots
- Clade: Rosids
- Order: Brassicales
- Family: Capparaceae
- Genus: Boscia
- Species: B. angustifolia

Binomial name
- Boscia angustifolia A.Rich.

= Boscia angustifolia =

Species of plant

Boscia angustifolia is a shrub or small tree with lanceolate leaves commonly found in the savannah zones of Africa, from Senegal moving eastwards to Sudan. It is part of the Capparaceae family. The plant is also known as the rough-leaved shepherds tree.

== Description ==
It is a smooth, grey barked shrub or small tree that is capable of reaching 7 m (23 ft) in height and with a short trunk. It has leaves with simple, alternate arrangement; leaf-blade is lanceolate to oblong outline with a coriaceous and glabrous upper surface, short, fine hairs beneath; it is 1.5-5 cm long and 1-1.5 cm wide, petiole is 2-7 mm long. Flowers are greenish to white, terminal or axillary clustered in raceme type of inflorescence. Fruit is spherical berries, about 6-10 mm in diameter.

== Distribution ==
Occurs in the Sudan and Sahel zones of West Africa, from Senegal to Nigeria and eastwards towards the Red Sea where it has been identified in Sudan and Egypt then southwards towards Northern South Africa.

== Chemistry ==
Test on parts of the species identified the methylated flavonoid, ombuin, the carboxylic acid compounds: lactic and quinic acid, and about three nitrogen methyl compounds including 1-methyl imino thieno [3,4b] naphthalene.

== Uses ==
The roots are used in decoctions to treat a variety of bacteria infection and other health issues including diarrhea, pneumonia, urinary tract infection, chest pain and boil. Its leaves and fruit are used to induce purging and to act as a cholagogue.
