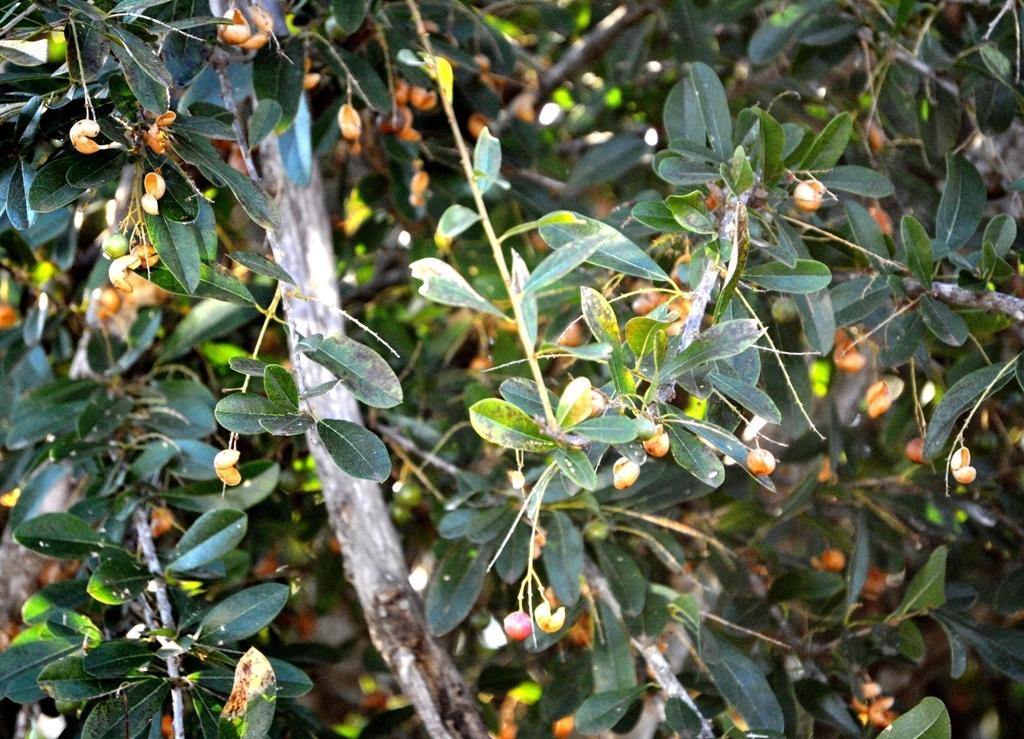

Scientific classification
- Kingdom: Plantae
- Clade: Tracheophytes
- Clade: Angiosperms
- Clade: Eudicots
- Clade: Rosids
- Order: Brassicales
- Family: Capparaceae
- Genus: Boscia
- Species: B. mossambicensis

Binomial name
- Boscia mossambicensis Klotzsch, 1861

Synonyms
- Boscia carsonii Baker; Boscia elegans Gilg; Boscia grandiflora Gilg; Boscia gymnosporiifolia Chiov.; Boscia hildebrandtii Gilg; Boscia holzii Gilg & Benedict; Boscia pachyandra Gilg; Boscia uhligii Gilg & Benedict; Boscia viridiflava Gilg & Benedict; Boscia zimmereri Gilg & Winkl.

= Boscia mossambicensis =

Broad-leaved shepherd tree

Species of flowering plant

Boscia mossambicensis is a species of plant in family Capparaceae, which is native to East and southern Africa, where it occurs at lower elevations.

== Range ==
It occurs in Botswana, the southern DRC, Ethiopia, Kenya, Mozambique, Namibia, Somalia, South Africa (eastern Limpopo and eastern Mpumalanga provinces), Tanzania, Zambia and Zimbabwe.

== See also ==
- List of Southern African indigenous trees and woody lianes
