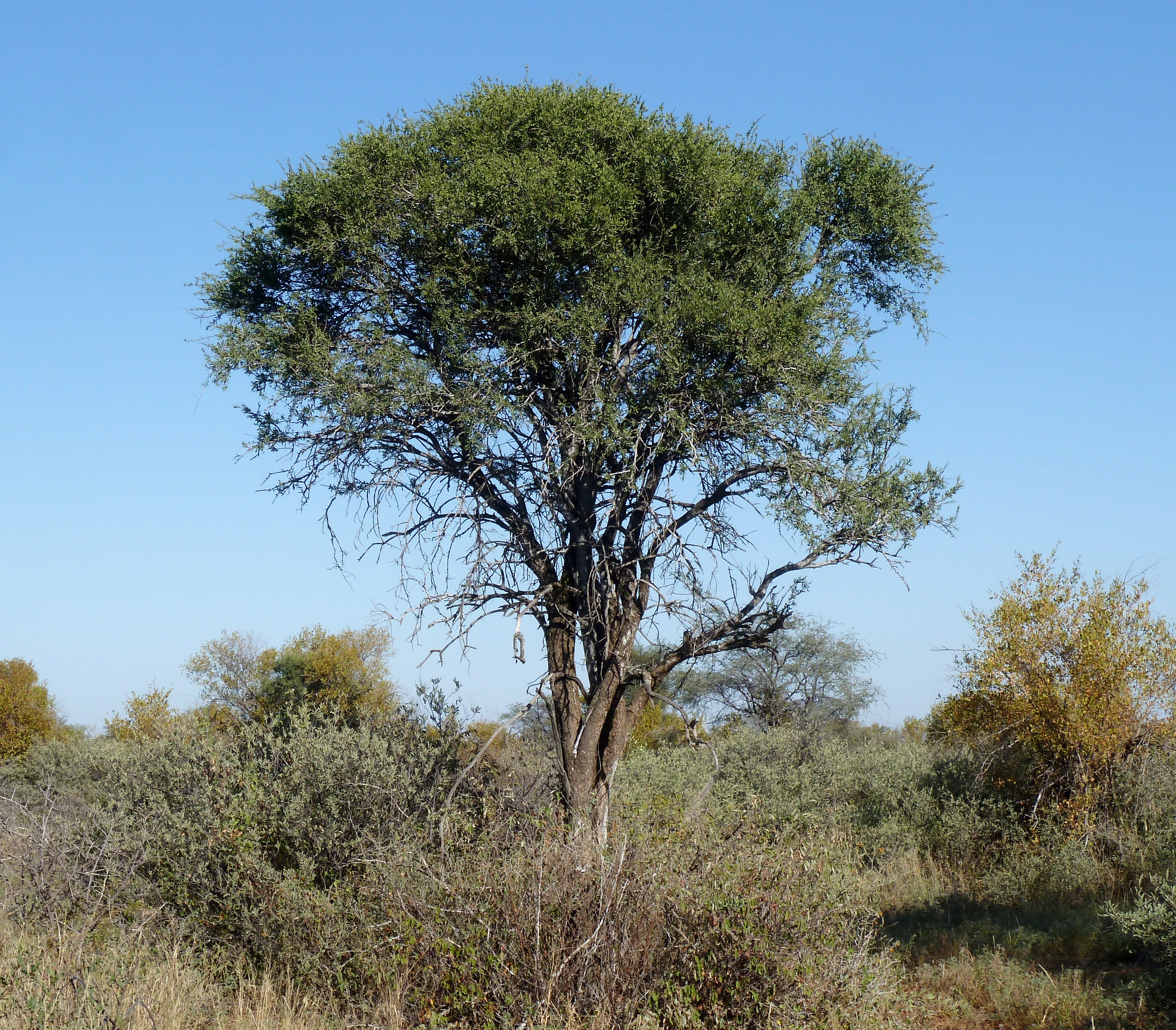

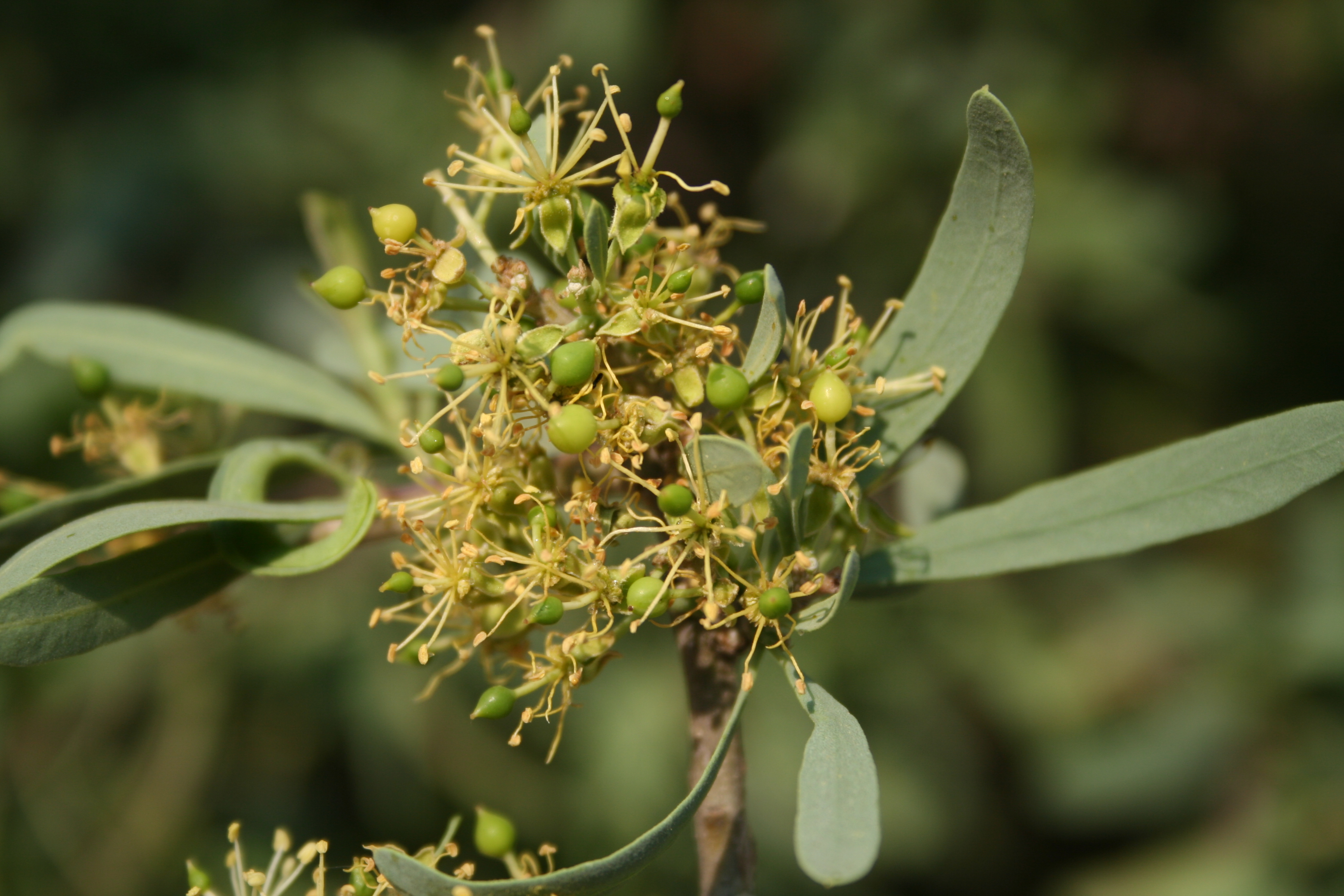

Conservation status
- Least Concern (IUCN 3.1)

Scientific classification
- Kingdom: Plantae
- Clade: Tracheophytes
- Clade: Angiosperms
- Clade: Eudicots
- Clade: Rosids
- Order: Brassicales
- Family: Capparaceae
- Genus: Boscia
- Species: B. albitrunca

Binomial name
- Boscia albitrunca (Burch.) Gilg & Ben.

= Boscia albitrunca =

Shepherd tree

Species of tree

Boscia albitrunca, commonly known as the shepherd tree or shepherd's tree (Afrikaans: witgat, Sotho: Mohlôpi, Tswana: Motlôpi, Venda: Muvhombwe, Xhosa: Umgqomogqomo, Zulu: Umvithi), is a protected species of South African tree in the caper family. It is known for having the deepest known root structure of any plant at: -68 metres (223 ft).

The species epithet "albitrunca" refers to the white trunk it oftentimes develops. Traditionally, the shepherd tree was used by Dutch settlers, boers, to create a variant of coffee from the roots of the tree. It is an evergreen tree native to southern and tropical Africa, living in the hot, dry, and often seasonally brackish low-lying areas, sometimes on abundant lime or occasionally on rocky terrain. It is a common tree of the Kalahari, bushveld and lowveld. It is one of the most important animal forage trees in the Kalahari.

== Description ==
This tree grows up to 10 m (33 ft) tall but is usually much smaller. It has a prominent, sturdy white trunk frequently with strips of rough, dark-coloured bark. The crown is often browsed by antelope and any grazers capable of reaching the foliage, resulting in a conspicuous flattened underside, or browse-line. The leaves are narrow, oblanceolate, and stiff, with veins obscure except for the distinct midrib. The flowers are small, greenish-yellow, lacking petals, starburst-shaped, and clustered. The fruits, on a jointed stalk, are about 10 mm (0.4 in) in diameter and are brittle-skinned with a whitish flesh and large endocarp. A specimen found in the central Kalahari in 1974 had roots extending to 68 m (223 ft) deep, making it the plant with the deepest known roots thus far found.

== Relationships ==
Boscia belongs to the caper family, Capparaceae. Boscia albitrunca is closely related to Boscia foetida subsp. rehmanniana, the bushveld shepherd's tree, which has much smaller leaves and velvet-textured skin on its fruits. The genus was named for Louis Bosc (1759–1828), a French professor of agriculture who lived through the French Revolution.

== Gallery ==
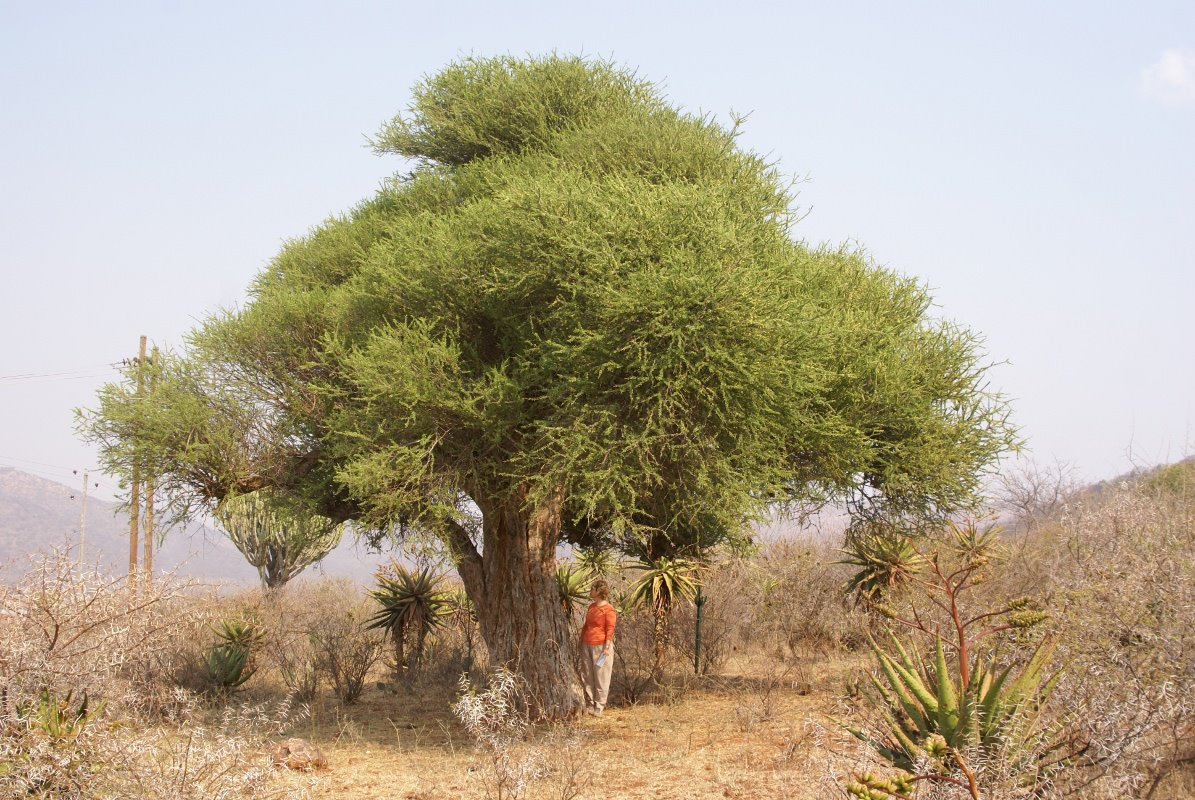
Specimen with a clear browse line, Limpopo

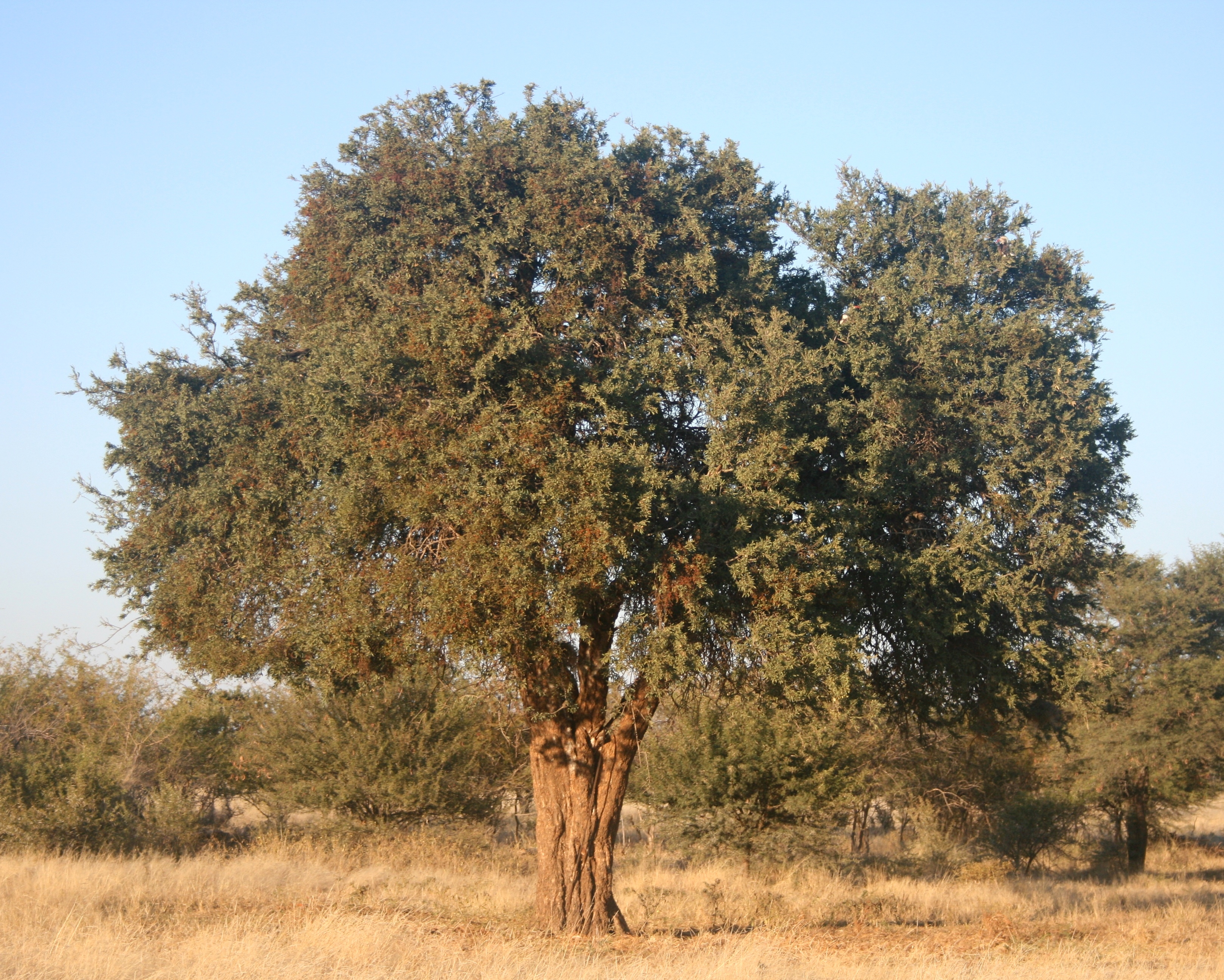
Specimen with its canopy infested with red-berry mistletoe, Limpopo

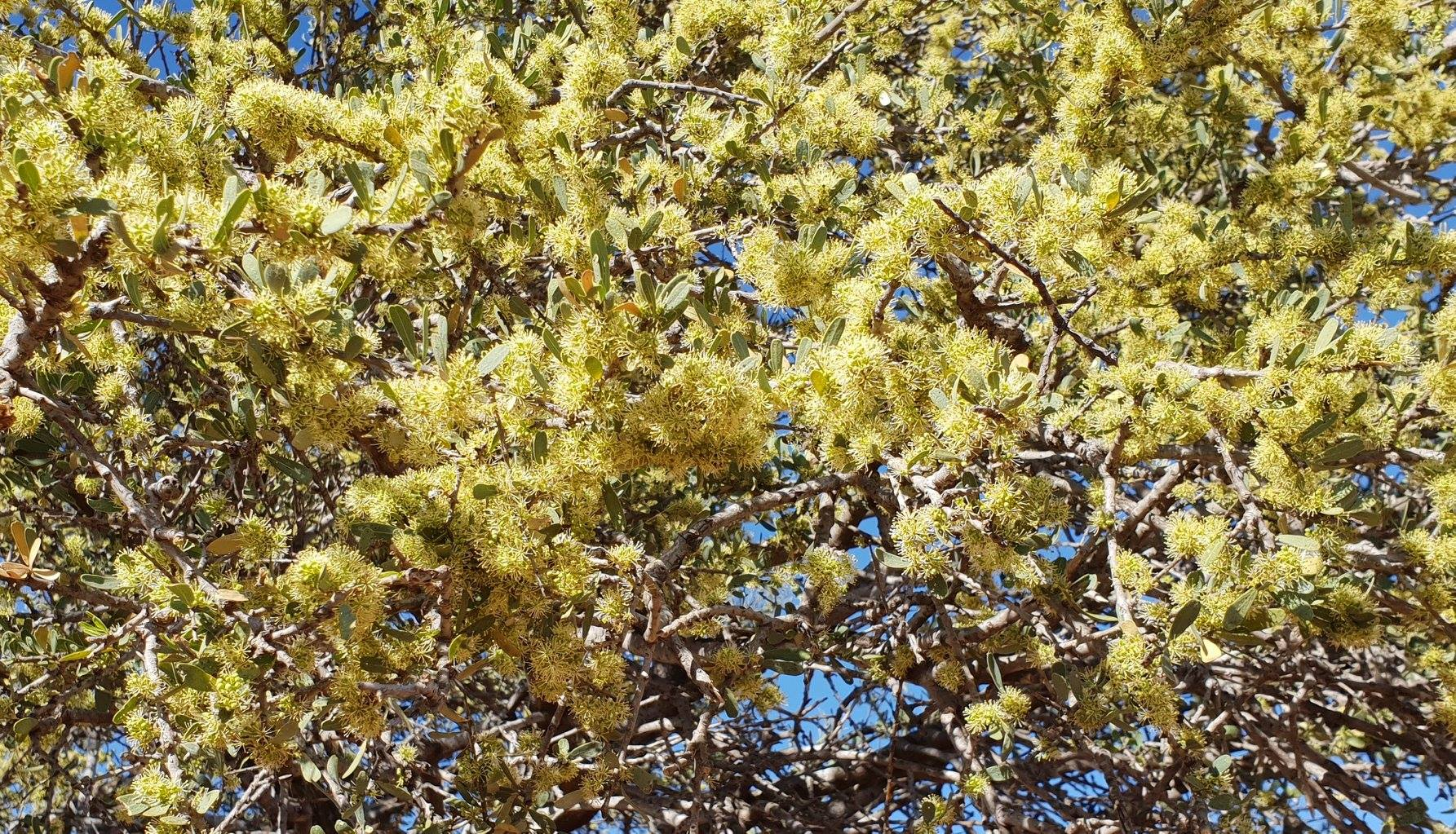
Flowering during late winter, Limpopo

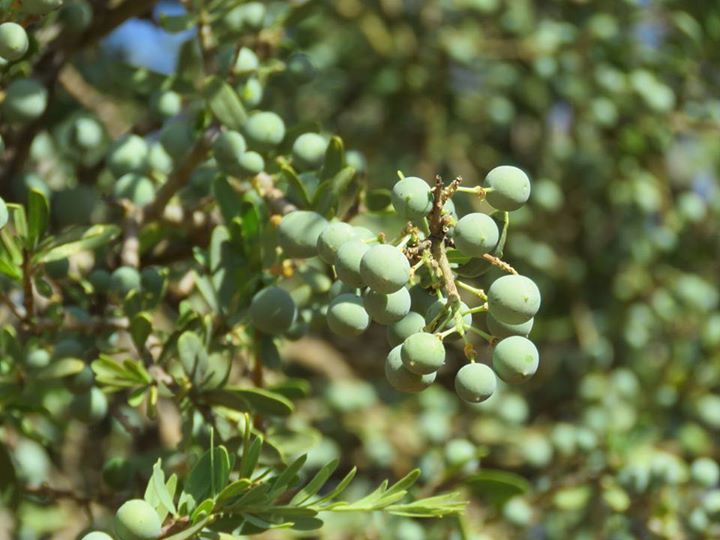
Green fruit during spring, Kalahari

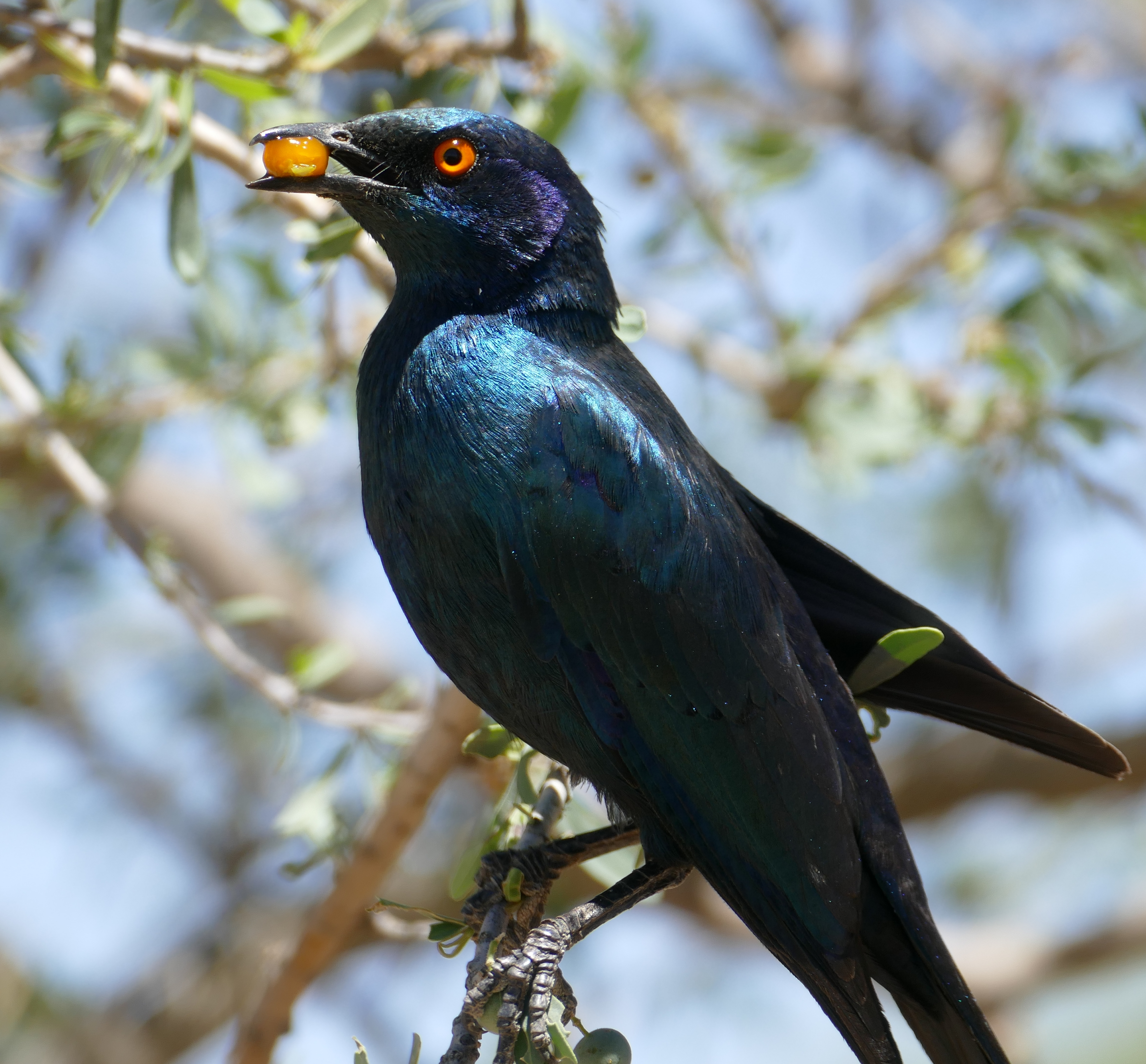
Ripe fruit consumed by a cape starling, early summer, Kgalagadi
