= Mazayjan, Bavanat =

City in Fars province, Iran

Mazayjan Persian: مزايجان
- City
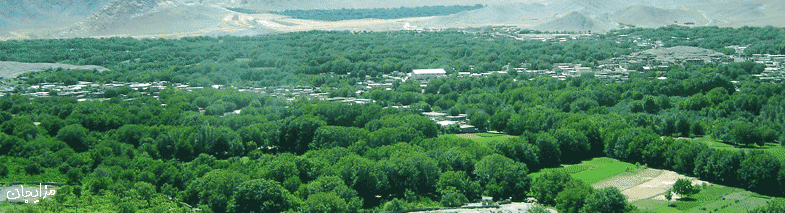

- Location within Iran
- Coordinates: 30°17′36″N 53°48′09″E
- Country: Iran
- Province: Fars
- County: Bavanat
- District: Mazayjan

Population (2016)
  - Total: 3,567
- Time zone: UTC+3:30 (IRST)

Mazayjan (Persian: مزايجان) (Note: Also romanized as Mazāyjān; also known as Mazījān) is a city in, and the capital of, Mazayjan District of Bavanat County, Fars province, Iran. It also serves as the administrative center for Mazayjan Rural District.

== Demographics ==
=== Population ===
At the time of the 2006 National Census, the city's population was 3,321 in 899 households, when it was a village in Mazayjan Rural District of the Central District. The following census in 2011 counted 3,041 people in 927 households, by which time the rural district had been separated from the district in the formation of Mazayjan District. The 2016 census measured the population of the city as 3,567 people in 1,193 households, when the village of Mazayjan had been elevated to the status of a city.
