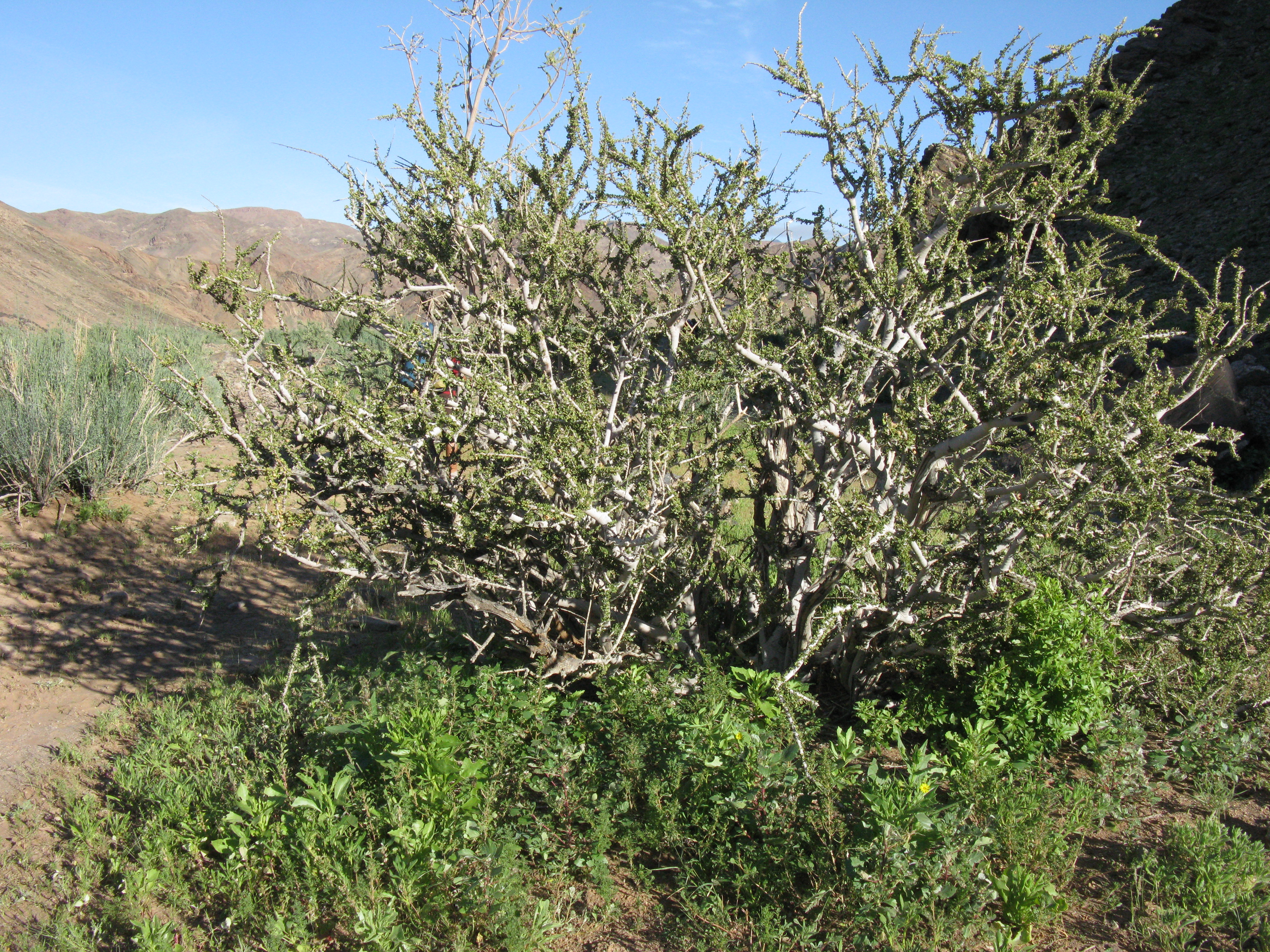

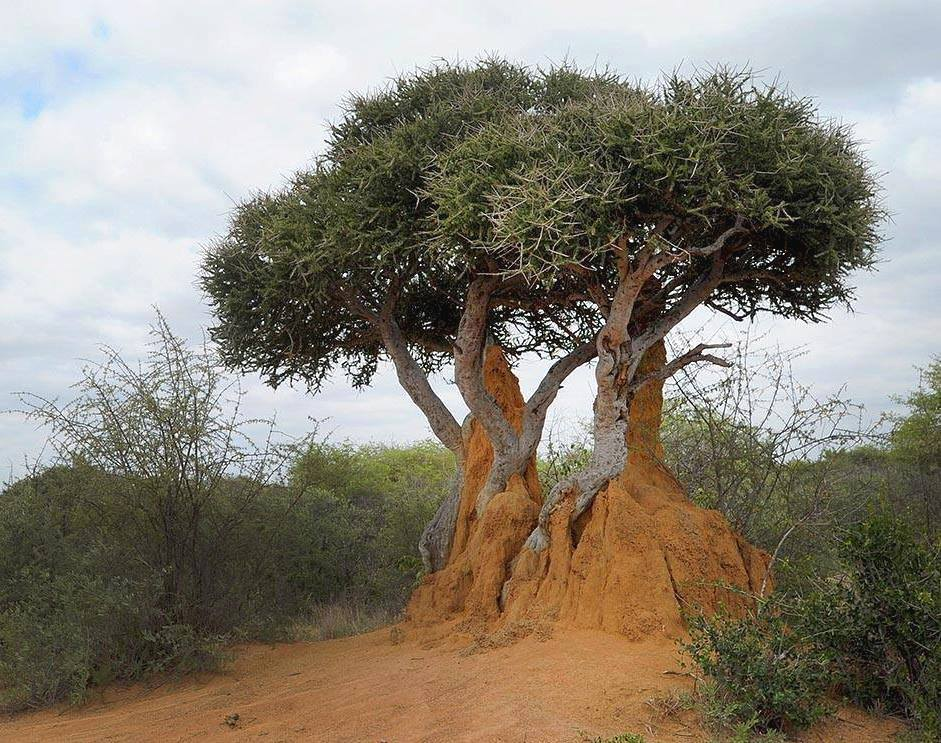
- Nominate subspecies in Namibia and B. f. subsp. rehmanniana in Limpopo

Scientific classification
- Kingdom: Plantae
- Clade: Tracheophytes
- Clade: Angiosperms
- Clade: Eudicots
- Clade: Rosids
- Order: Brassicales
- Family: Capparaceae
- Genus: Boscia
- Species: B. foetida

Binomial name
- Boscia foetida Schinz, 1888

= Boscia foetida =

Stink shepherd's tree

Species of tree

Boscia foetida, commonly known as the stink shepherd's tree and the smelly shepherd's bush, is an evergreen shrub or tree that is native to the warmer and drier parts southern Africa. It is found in semi-desert and arid bushveld, and in the west it occurs commonly in areas which are otherwise sparsely wooded. It is known for the particularly unpleasant smell of its flowers which appear during early spring, to which its specific name foetida alludes. Its freshly cut wood likewise has an unpleasant smell, and has traditional medicinal and magical uses, for instance as a protection against lightning. In central Botswana the village of Mopipi is named after this species.

== Description ==
=== Habit ===
It has several or many stems in the west, but is often single-stemmed in the east. It has a flattish, spreading crown, and is densely branched with some branches ending in spines. In Namibia it is often a shrub measuring about 1 m tall and 3 m wide, but it may also be a tree of up to 3 meters or over. It is similar to the closely related B. albitrunca, which is however distinguishable from most subspecies by its discolorous and distinctly larger leaves, and its smooth fruit. It may also be confused with Maerua parvifolia.

=== Bark ===
The smooth bark is pale grey to grey, with darker bark exposed in the fissures. Young branchlets have grey bark with a plum-coloured underlayer.

=== Foliage ===
The shortly petiolate leaves are arranged in tight clusters on little knobs. The small, hard leaves usually measure less than 8 mm in length, but rarely up to 13 mm. They are grey-green in colour, concolorous in the west and discolorous in the east, and appear dark green from a distance. Foliage is browsed by game and livestock.

=== Flowers ===
The small, greenish flowers lack petals but have prominent stamens, and a gynophore which equals the ovary and style in length. They are clustered in axillary racemes or may be reduced to axillary fascicles. They emit a rancid odour, after which the tree is named. Birds may feed on the flowers or use it as nesting material.

=== Fruit ===
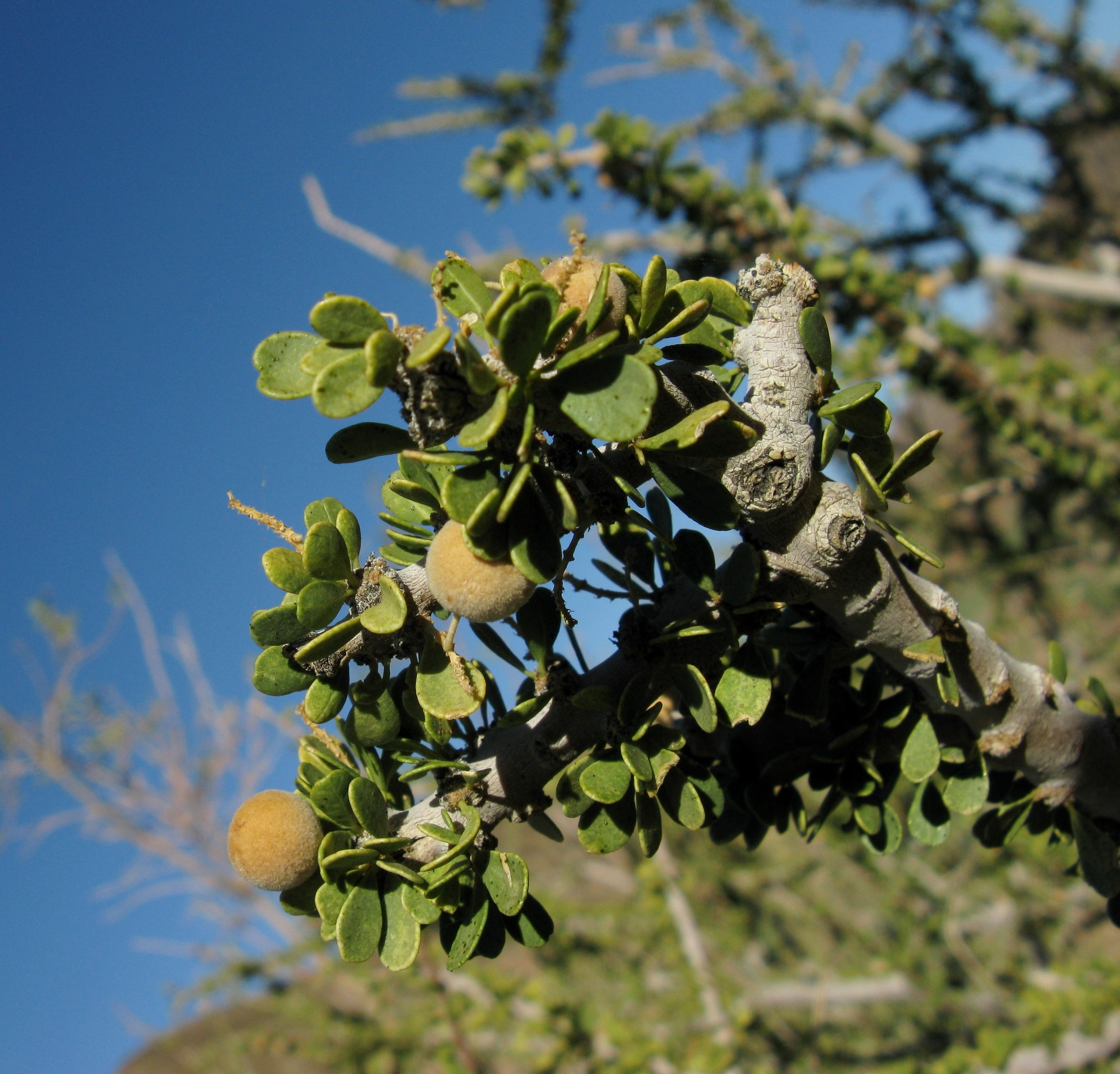
Ripe fruit of B. f. subsp. foetida

It produces abundant globose fruit in summer that ripen to a yellowish or pale-brown colour. They have a velvet-textured exterior, as opposed to those of B. albitrunca, which are smooth. They are about 1 cm in diameter and are eaten by rodents, birds and people. The fruit usually contains a single brown seed.

== Range and habitat ==
It occurs in Namibia up to the Kunene region, the Northern Cape, central Botswana to southern Zimbabwe and the Transvaal bushveld and lowveld, eastern Eswatini, KwaZulu-Natal southwards to the Tugela valley, and in southernmost Mozambique. It grows mainly on plains in semi-desert or arid bushveld. It is also present on hillsides, rocky outcrops, termite mounds or along dry river courses. It grows on rocky, stony or gravel substrates in the west, and is absent from sand except where a rocky substrate is present.

== Subspecies ==
There are five subspecies:

- Boscia foetida subsp. filipes (Gilg) M.C.Lötter – Sandveld shepherd's tree

Range: northern Limpopo, northern KZN, eastern Eswatini and southern Mozambique
Description: Up to 4 m tall shrub with greyish to yellowish-green bark, leaves 1.2–3.4 cm, somewhat shiny above and dull below, alternate or in fascicles of up to 4, petiole 1–2 mm long, flowers with 6–8 stamens and pedicels up to 7 mm

- Boscia foetida subsp. foetida Schinz – Stink shepherd's tree

Range: Namibia to Northern Cape, South Africa
Description: Branches from ground level, leaves very small and concolorous, flowers with 11–15 stamens

- Boscia foetida subsp. longipedicellata (Gilg) Toelken – Tugela shepherd's tree

Range: Tugela valley in central KwaZulu-Natal
Description: Single-stemmed up to 1 m, and large-leaved (1–3.5 cm), flowers with 11–15 stamens, long and slender flower stalks (for which it is named)

- Boscia foetida subsp. minima (Gilg) M.C.Lötter – Dwarf shepherd's tree

Range: South Africa. North West province, northern Gauteng, western Limpopo, Tshokwane region of Kruger National Park.
Description: Small shrublet

- Boscia foetida subsp. rehmanniana (Pestal.) Toelken – Bushveld shepherd's tree

Range: Transvaal bushveld, incl. northern Mpumalanga, to central Botswana. Absent from lowveld.
Description: Single-stemmed up to 1 m, leaves up to 1.3 cm, flowers with 5–7 stamens

== Gallery ==
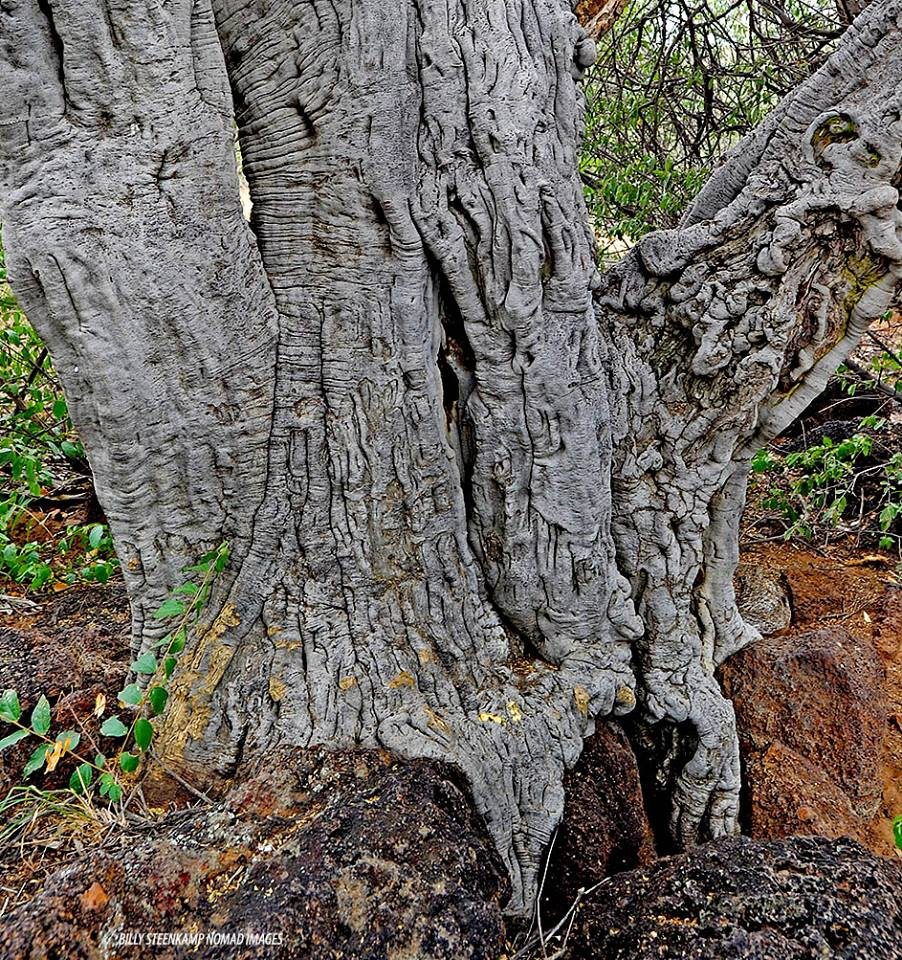
subsp. rehmanniana,
bark

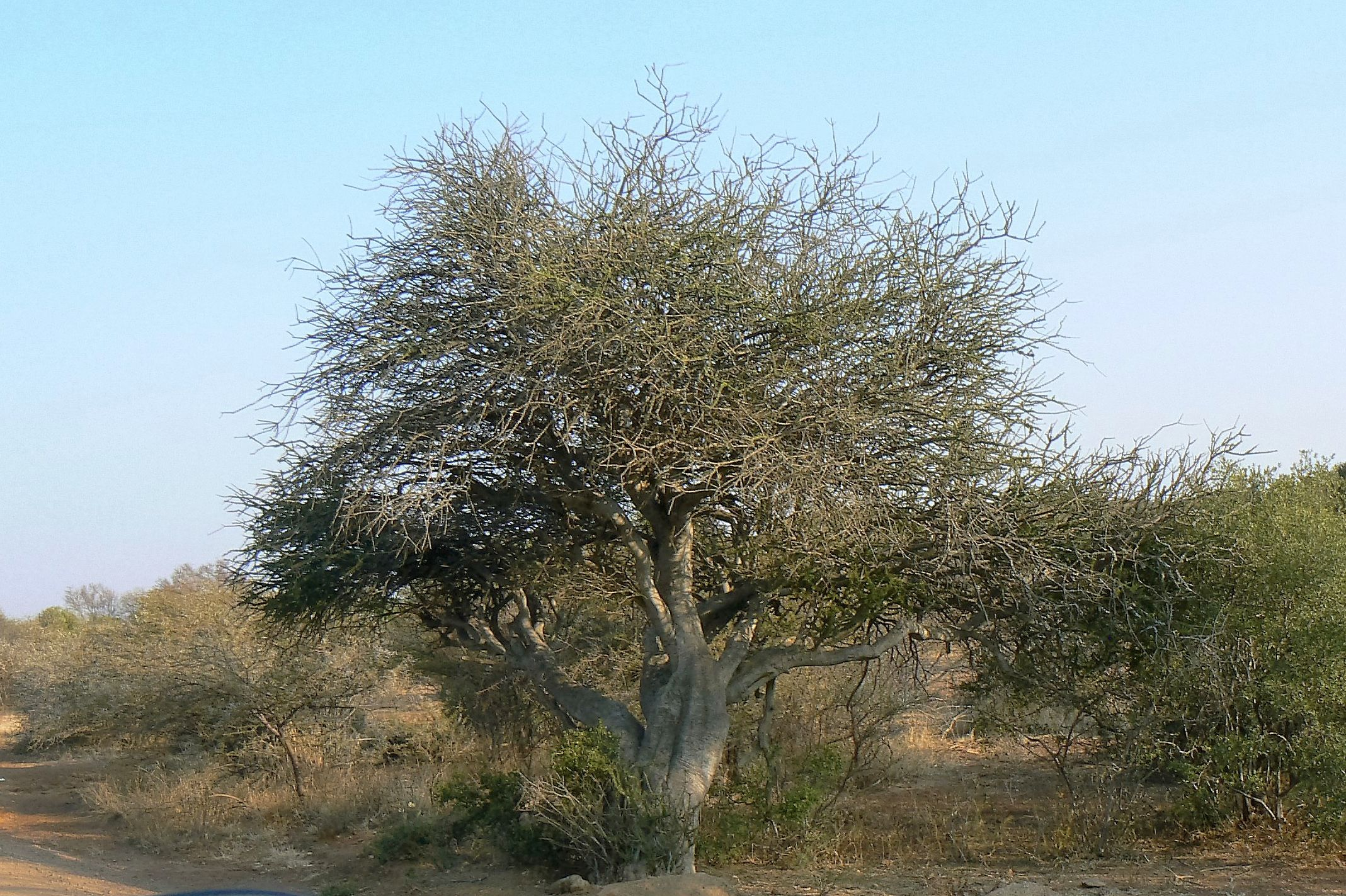
subsp. rehmanniana, habit at Pilanesberg

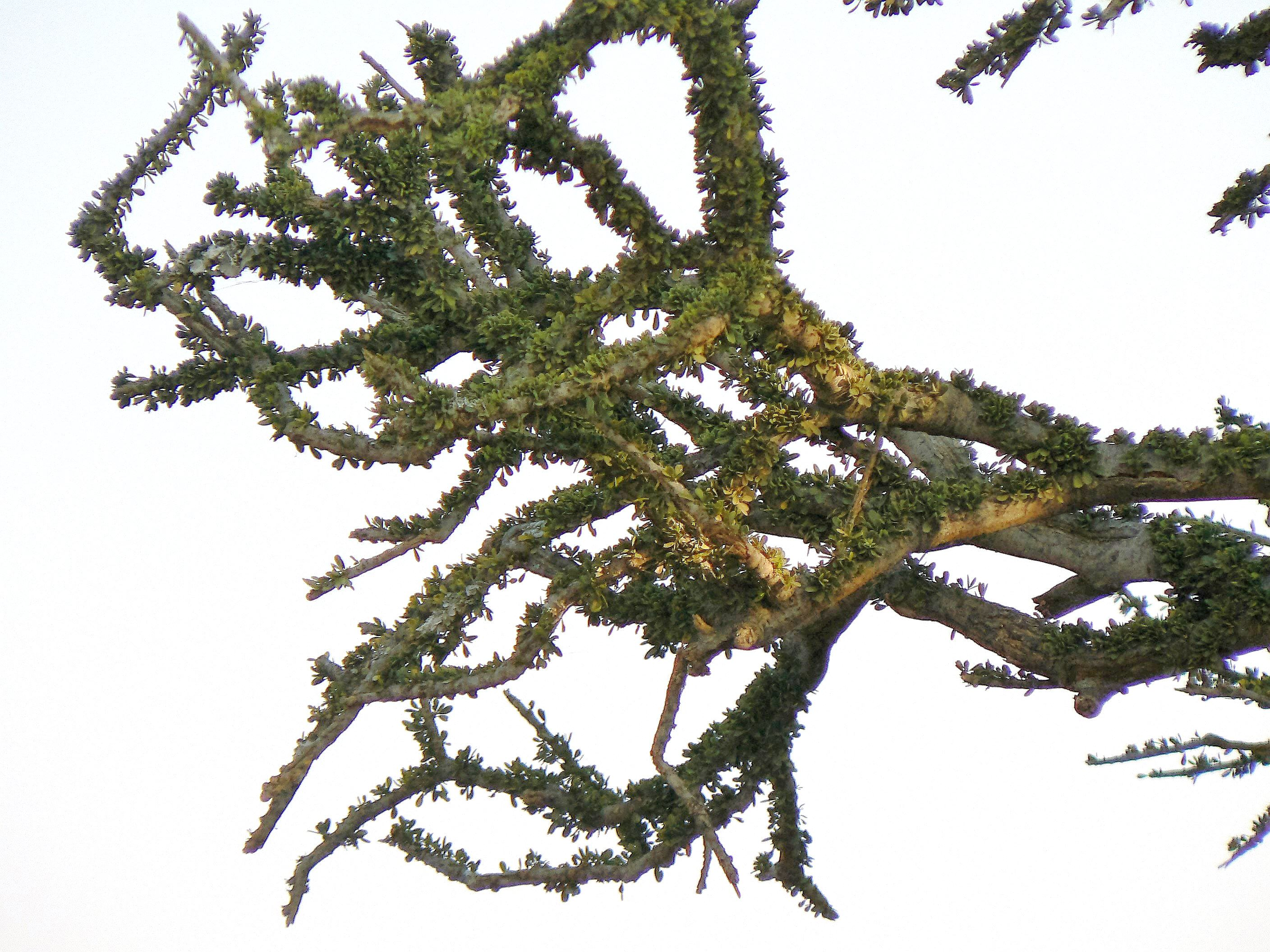
subsp. rehmanniana, branches and foliage at Pilanesberg

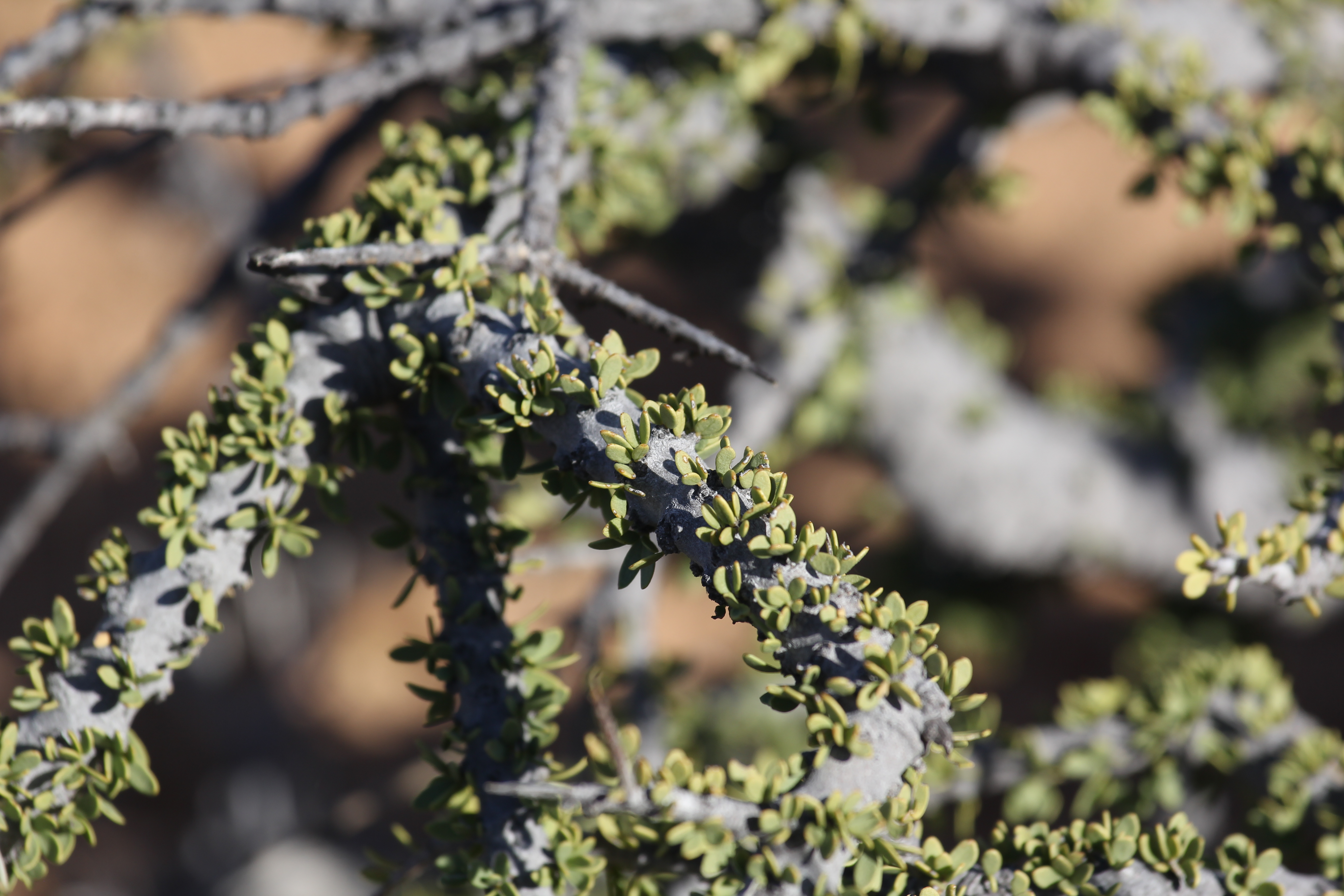
subsp. foetida,
foliage
