= Qaziabad, Azna =

Qaziabad قاضي اباد
- Village
- Location within Iran
- Coordinates: 33°21′12″N 49°26′14″E
- Country: Iran
- Province: Lorestan
- County: Azna
- Bakhsh: Central
- Rural District: Pachehlak-e Gharbi

Population (2006)
  - Total: 169
- Time zone: UTC+3:30 (IRST)
  - Summer (DST): UTC+4:30 (IRDT)

Qaziabad (Persian: قاضي اباد, also Romanized as Qāẕīābād) is a village in Pachehlak-e Gharbi Rural District, in the Central District of Azna County, Lorestan Province, Iran. At the 2006 census, its population was 169, in 34 families.
