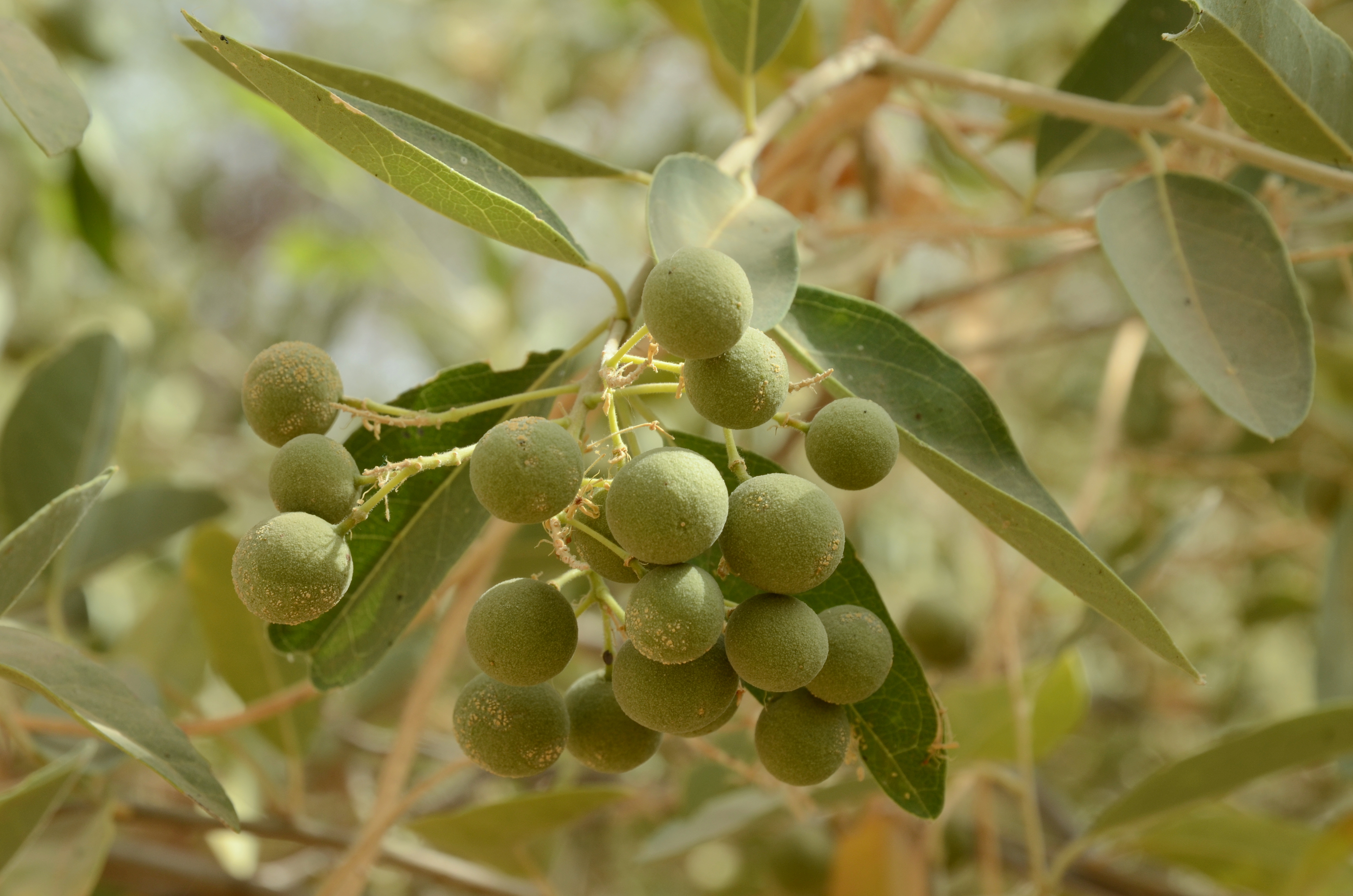
- Unripe fruits

Scientific classification
- Kingdom: Plantae
- Clade: Tracheophytes
- Clade: Angiosperms
- Clade: Eudicots
- Clade: Rosids
- Order: Brassicales
- Family: Capparaceae
- Genus: Boscia
- Species: B. senegalensis

Binomial name
- Boscia senegalensis (Pers.) Lam. ex Poir.

= Boscia senegalensis =

Species of tree

Boscia senegalensis, commonly known as hanza, is a member of the family Capparaceae.

The plant originated from West Africa. Still a traditional food plant in Africa, this fruit has potential to improve nutrition, boost food security, foster rural development and support sustainable landcare. It produces products for consumption, household needs, and medicinal and agricultural uses.

== Description ==
Boscia senegalensis is a perennial woody plant species of the genus Boscia in the caper family, Capparaceae. This plant is classified as a dicot. This evergreen shrub can grow anywhere from 2 to 4 m (6 ft 7 in to 13 ft 1 in) in height under favourable conditions. The leaves of the plant are small and leathery, reaching 12 cm × 4 cm (4.7 in × 1.6 in). B. senegalensis produces fruits, clustered in small bunches, in the form of yellow spherical berries, up to 1.5 cm (0.59 in) in diameter. These fruits contain 1–4 seeds, which are a greenish hue when mature.

Common names include: aizen (Mauritania and Western Sahara), mukheit (Arabic), hanza (Hausa), bere (Bambara), ngigili (Fulani), mandiarha (Berber), anza (Zarma) and 'taedent (Tamasheq). The fruits are also known as dilo (Hausa), bokkhelli (Arabic), gigile (Fulani) and kanduwi (Tamasheq).

== Distribution and habitat ==
Boscia senegalensis is a wild species, native to the Sahel region in Africa. It has not yet been domesticated. It currently grows in: Algeria, Benin, Burkina Faso, Cameroon, Central African Republic, Chad, Ghana, Guinea, Kenya, Mali, Mauritania, Niger, Nigeria, Senegal, Somalia, Sudan, and Togo.

Boscia senegalensis grows in altitudes of 60–1,450 m (200–4,760 ft), in temperatures between 22–30 °C (72–86 °F) and with rainfall conditions of 100–500 mm (3.9–19.7 in) annually. It can be found growing in marginal soils: rocky, lateritic, clay stony hills, sand dunes, and sand-clay plains. These characteristics make it a highly resilient species, able to grow without expensive inputs even in the extremely hot and dry desert region of the Sahel.

== Cultivation ==
In times of severe drought and famine, when many other crops have failed, B. senegalensis can still survive and provide useful products. Ethnobotanical indigenous knowledge contributes to the importance of this plant to the Hausa peoples of Niger and Fulani herders in West Africa. During the famine of 1984–1985, it was reported that B. senegalensis was the most widely consumed famine food in both Sudan and Darfur, relied on by over 94% of people in northern Darfur.

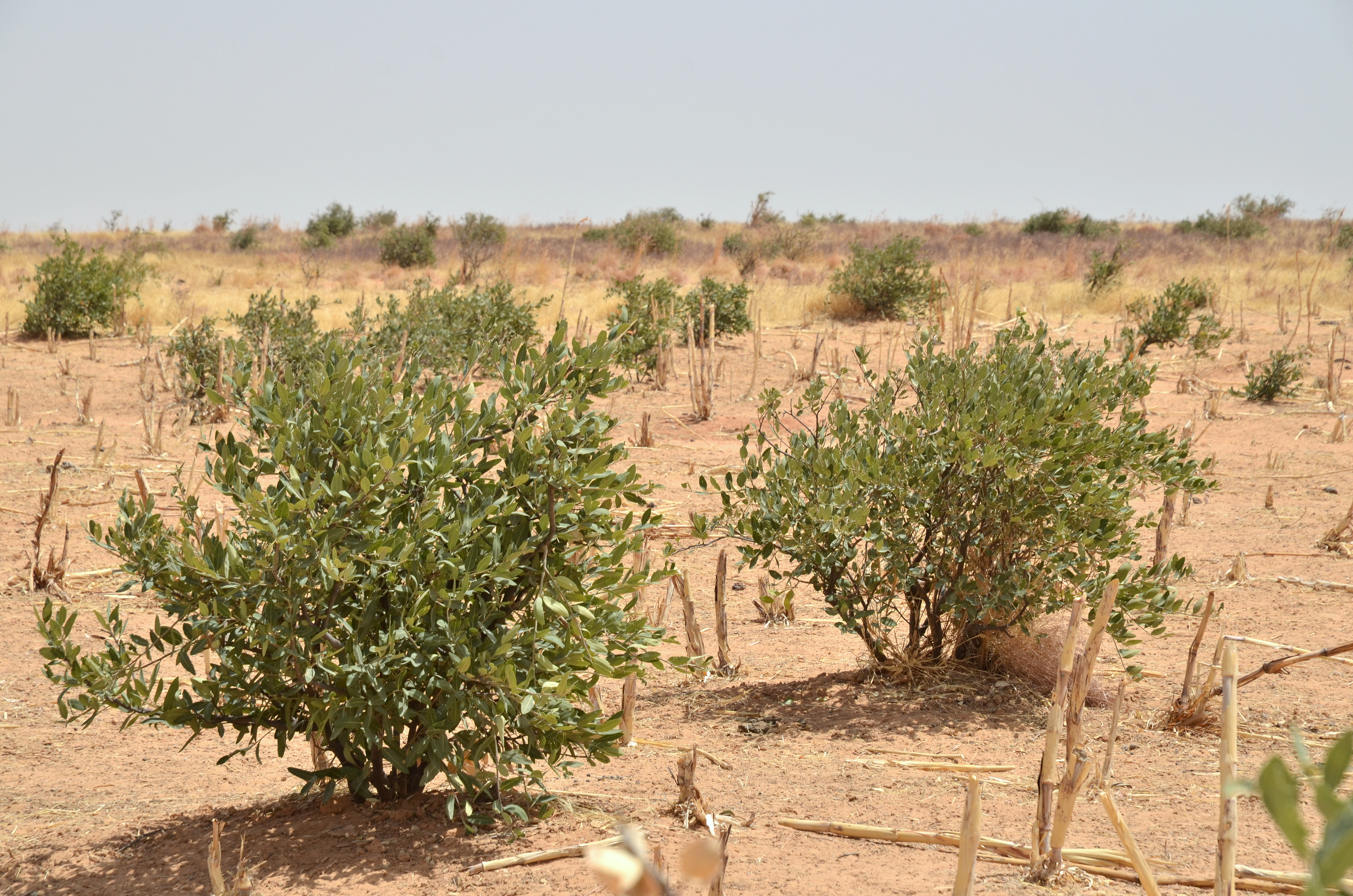
Occurrence in field

B. senegalensis can benefit farmers because it keeps soil from laying bare and thus prevents soil erosion and degradation. It also buffers against wind, stabilizes sand dunes, offers shade to surrounding plants and cycles nutrients. In Niger, the trees are often cut or burned down by farmers in the dry season, in order to make space on the field for staple crops such as millet or sorghum. However, due to the strong surviving character of the tree, it reappears after the first rains and continues growing as a small bush.

One intervention with the potential to help poor farmers is the creation of cool temperature storage facilities – as B. senegalensis seeds can be stored for up to 2 months at 15 °C (59 °F).

It is recommended that the techniques of grafting and generating hybrids (wide-crosses) with related species be explored, as both techniques have the potential to increase harvests and/or improve the fruits. Promising preliminary research is being conducted using in vitro tissue culture technologies to propagate B. senegalensis. Additionally, direct seedling trials are recommended and being advanced by the Eden Foundation.

=== Economics ===
Leaves, seeds and fruits of B. senegalensis are traded in many small markets in the Sahel region. Some opportunities to add value are: roasting seeds to be sold as a coffee substitute, fermenting fruit into beer, processing fruit and seeds into prepared food, or processing leaves into medicinal applications. It can help raise incomes of the poor by protecting their stored cereals from pests and by substituting for other purchases from the market.

In Niger, an SMI specialising in non-wood forest products markets a variety of products derived from the seeds of hanza.

A major constraint to the wider adoption of B. senegalensis is the recalcitrant nature of its seeds. Seeds of this type are not well suited for ex-situ conservation, as they rapidly lose viability, and embryos are killed when seeds are dried. This creates a barrier to widespread growth, as it is difficult to propagate large numbers of plants for large-scale genetic selection and breeding. Other drawbacks to consumption include the issue of toxicity and the associated need to use scarce water resources and additional labour to leach out toxins during the debittering process.

Women in rural areas usually have the responsibility of gathering and preparing B. senegalensis for consumption. This process can create an extra work burden for women, however, their dominion over this process may result in increased access to this food source and thus contribute to improving their nutritional status. In Niger, the commercially processed hanza seeds are gathered and pre-processed by rural women, giving them a valuable source of income.

== Bitterness ==
The very bitter taste of the hanza seeds comes from high doses of glucocapparin (MeGSL). In order to make them edible, the seeds must be debittered. This is usually done by different water soaking techniques, taking about a week. The glucocapparin leaches out into the water in a modified state, where it is turned into methylisothiocyanate (MeITC). This bitter water has pesticide and herbicide properties.

The bitterness of the hanza seeds functions as a natural pesticide when the fruits hang on the tree. Very few predators show interest in consuming the fruits until they are fully ripe, at which state birds may be attracted to the sweet jelly mesocarp. Likewise, harvested bitter, dried hanza seeds are not known to be eaten by rodents or insects. Therefore, bitter hanza seeds can be safely stored for several years as long as they are protected from rain and humidity. They can then be debittered and consumed on demand. This can be very helpful in ensuring food security.

== Uses ==
Fruits are ready for human consumption at the beginning of the rainy season, when most crops are just being planted, and there is little other food available. Fruits can be consumed raw and cooked. Raw fruits initially contain a sweet pulp that then dries out to a sugary solid, difficult to separate from seed. Fruits are often cooked prior to consumption. Juice can also be extracted and boiled down into a butter-like consistency that can be mixed with millet and milk to make cakes. In Sudan, the fruit is fermented into a beer.

The seeds of B. senegalensis are also important sources of nutrition, especially during times of famine. To gain access to the seeds, fruits are dried in the sun, pounded to remove the outer seed coat and soaked in water for several days, changing the water every day. The seed soaking process, also known as debittering, is essential to remove bitter and potentially toxic components. Seeds are usually cooked prior to consumption. Cooked seeds are texturally similar to a chickpea and can be used as a cereal substitute in stews, soups and porridges. Additionally, seeds can be re-dried and stored for later use or ground into a flour that can be used to make porridge. Roasted seeds can also serve as a substitute for coffee.

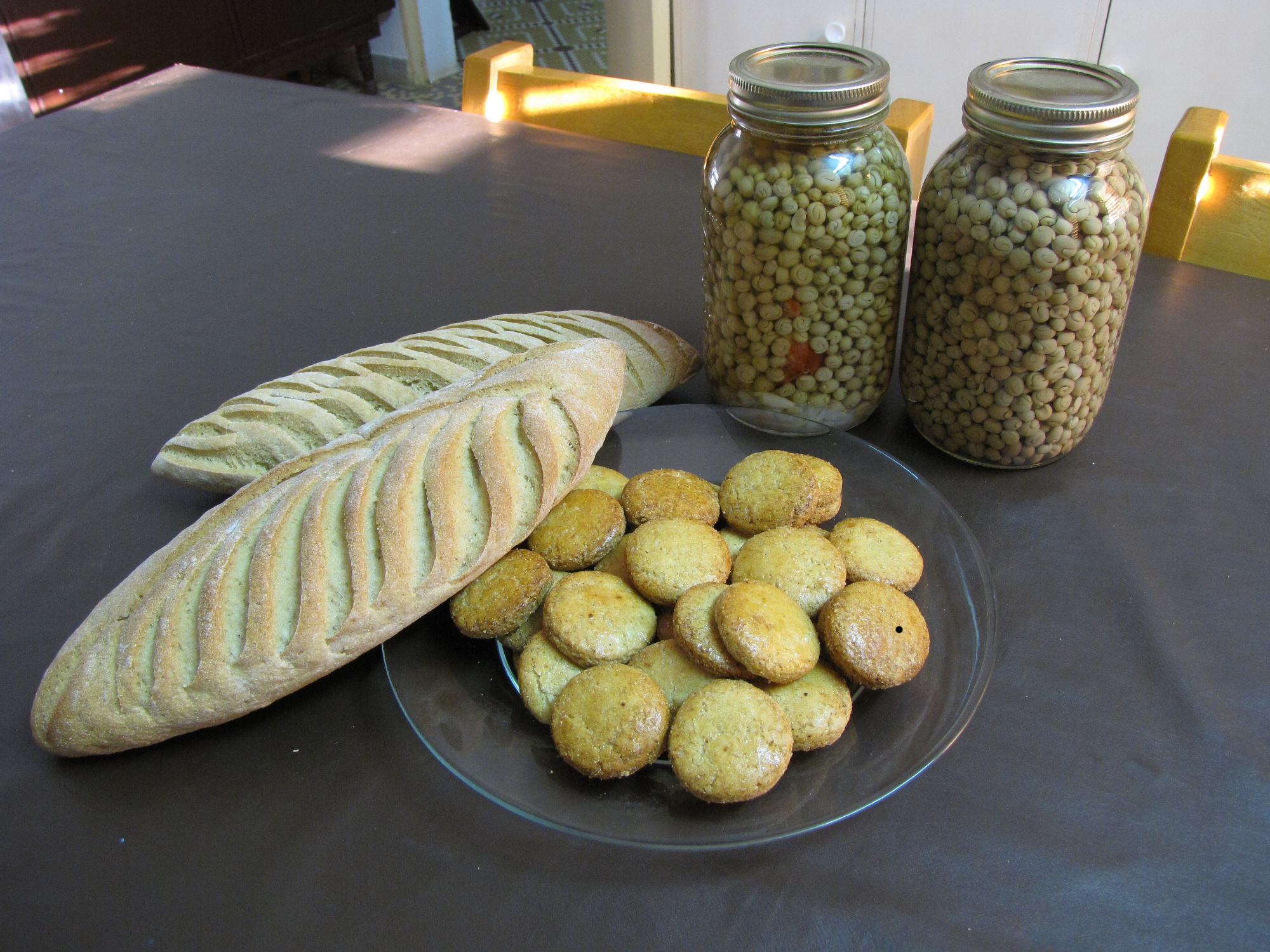
Hanza bread, cookies and cooked hanza, Zinder, Republic of Niger

Modern uses of B. senegalensis seeds are being developed in Niger Republic. They include couscous, cakes, cookies, bread, hummus, canned and popped seeds. These products from natural, wild B. senegalensis were recognised with the innovation award at an international food fair in Niamey, Niger, 2012.

Leaf extracts contain carbohydrate hydrolase enzymes that are useful for the production of cereal-based flour and for reducing the bulk of cereal porridges. Due to their proven biocidal activities, leaves are also added to granaries to protect cereals against pathogens. Leaves have many medicinal properties, notably anti-parasitic, fungicidal, anti-inflammatory and wound healing properties. Leaves, although not pleasant to taste, can be used as emergency forage for animals.

Young roots can be ground and boiled down into a thick, sweet porridge.

Wood can be used for construction as well as for cooking fuel.

Boscia senegalensis contains natural coagulants that can be used to clarify water sources. Components of the plant (bark, twigs, leaves, fruits) can be added to a bucket of murky water, and the natural coagulants will cause clay and other particulates to compact and sink the bottom, allowing clear water to be obtained from the top.

=== Nutrition ===
Fruits are a significant source of carbohydrates, as they contain 66.8% carbohydrates.

The seeds are sufficiently nutritious, although they do lack some essential nutrients, notably lysine and threonine. The seeds have significant levels of protein (25% of dry matter) and carbohydrates (60%). In these regards, seeds outperform local staple cereals such as sorghum and millet. Additionally, seeds are rich in zinc, iron, methionine, tryptophan, B-vitamins and linoleic acid (essential fatty acid). Seeds contain 3.6 times the World Health Organization (WHO) ideal level of tryptophan.

Leaves have high antioxidant capacity (nearly 1.5 times that of spinach) and are high in calcium, potassium, manganese and iron. The bioavailability of these compounds, however, is not very well known.
