= Sarvestan, Bam =

Sarvestan سروستان
- Village
- Location within Iran
- Coordinates: 29°16′20″N 57°53′10″E
- Country: Iran
- Province: Kerman
- County: Bam
- Bakhsh: Central
- Rural District: Howmeh

Population (2006)
  - Total: 404
- Time zone: UTC+3:30 (IRST)
  - Summer (DST): UTC+4:30 (IRDT)

Sarvestan (Persian: سروستان, also Romanized as Sarvestān; also known as Sardestān and Sarvistān) is a village in Howmeh Rural District, in the Central District of Bam County, Kerman Province, Iran. At the 2006 census, its population was 404, in 82 families.
