= Jeshnian, Marvdasht =

Jeshnian جشنيان
- Village
- Location within Iran
- Coordinates: 30°08′46″N 52°32′38″E
- Country: Iran
- Province: Fars
- County: Marvdasht
- Bakhsh: Dorudzan
- Rural District: Ramjerd-e Do

Population (2006)
  - Total: 961
- Time zone: UTC+3:30 (IRST)
  - Summer (DST): UTC+4:30 (IRDT)

Jeshnian (Persian: جشنيان, also Romanized as Jeshnīān and Jashneyān; also known as Jeshnīā) is a village in Ramjerd-e Do Rural District, Dorudzan District, Marvdasht County, Fars province, Iran. At the 2006 census, its population was 961, in 219 families.
