= Bavanat, Fars =

City in Fars province, Iran

Bavanat Persian: بوانات
- City
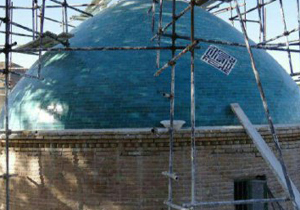
- Mohammad Hanafieh recreational center

- Location within Iran
- Coordinates: 30°28′18″N 53°37′34″E
- Country: Iran
- Province: Fars
- County: Bavanat
- District: Central
- Elevation: 2,857 m (9,373 ft)

Population (2016)
  - Total: 9,776
- Time zone: UTC+3:30 (IRST)

Bavanat (Persian: بوانات) (Note: Also romanized as Bavānāt and Bawānāt; formerly Surian (سوریان), also romanized as Suriān) is a city in the Central District of Bavanat County, Fars province, Iran, serving as capital of both the county and the district. It has an altitude of 2,857 metres (9,373 ft).

== Demographics ==
=== Population ===
At the time of the 2006 National Census, the city's population was 9,645 in 2,638 households. The following census in 2011 counted 10,670 people in 3,030 households. The 2016 census measured the population of the city as 9,776 people in 2,975 households.
