= Hanza, Yazd =

Hanza هنزا
- Village
- Location within Iran
- Coordinates: 31°37′18″N 54°13′35″E
- Country: Iran
- Province: Yazd
- County: Mehriz
- Bakhsh: Central
- Rural District: Miankuh

Population (2006)
  - Total: 134
- Time zone: UTC+3:30 (IRST)

Hanza (Persian: هنزا, also Romanized as Hanzā) is a village in Miankuh Rural District, in the Central District of Mehriz County, Yazd Province, Iran. At the 2006 census, its population was 134, in 48 families.
