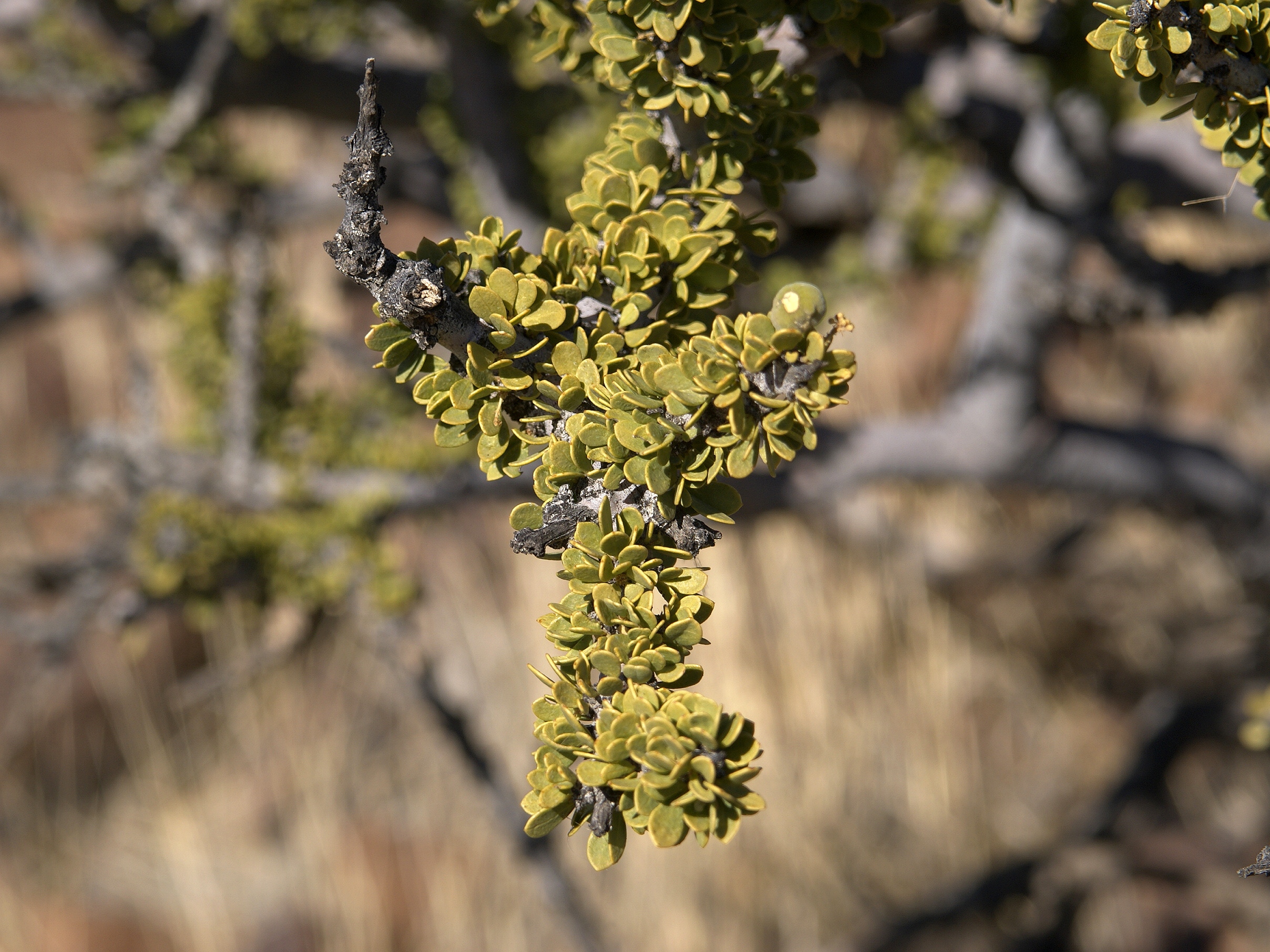
- Boscia foetida

Scientific classification
- Kingdom: Plantae
- Clade: Tracheophytes
- Clade: Angiosperms
- Clade: Eudicots
- Clade: Rosids
- Order: Brassicales
- Family: Capparaceae
- Genus: Boscia; Lam. (1793)

Synonyms
- Podoria Pers. (1806)

= Boscia =

Genus of flowering plants

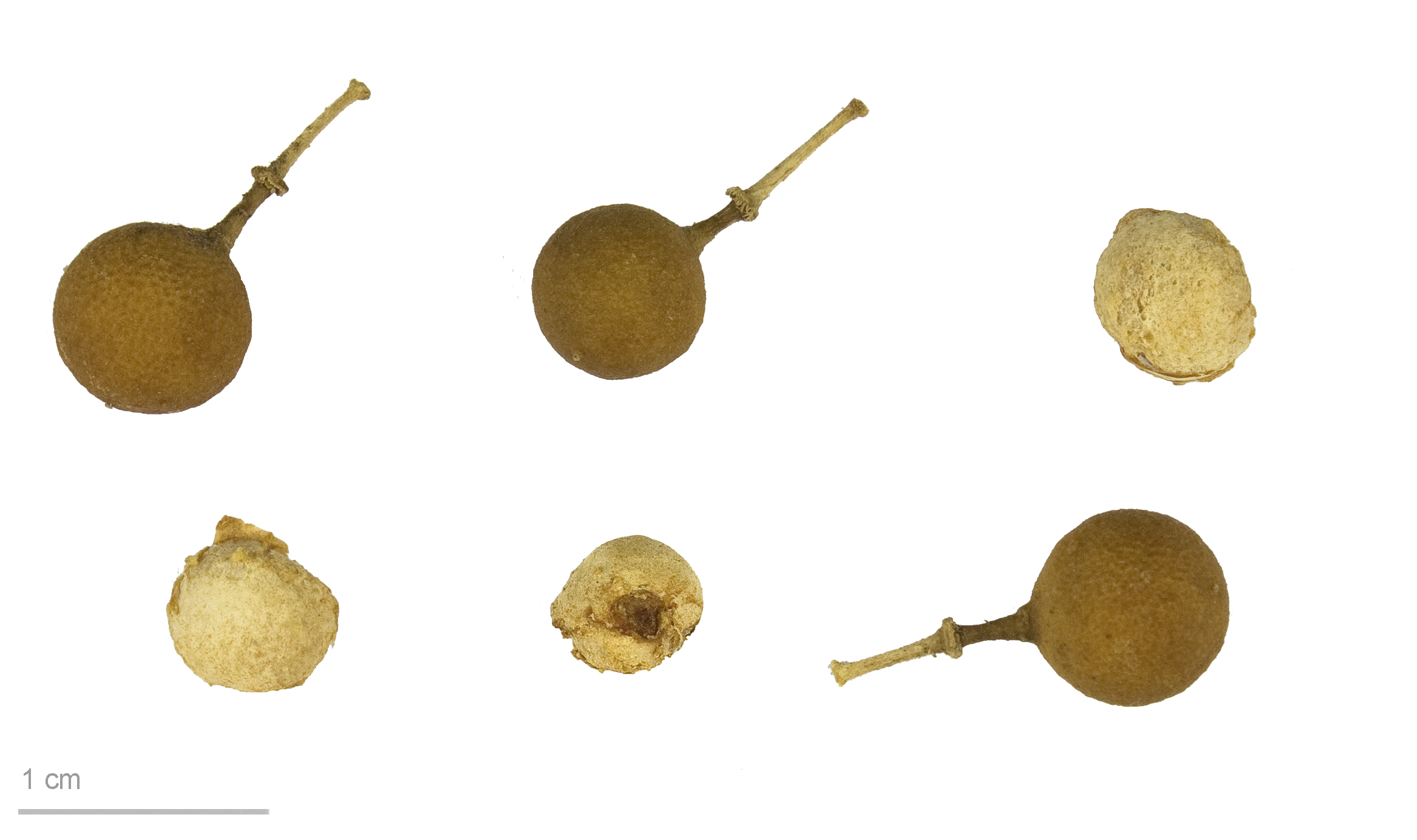
Boscia angustifolia - MHNT

Boscia is a genus of plants in the family Capparaceae. It contains the following species:

- Boscia albitrunca (Burch) Gilg & Ben.
- Boscia angustifolia A. Rich.
- Boscia arabica Pestalozii
- Boscia caffra Sond.
- Boscia coriacea Pax
- Boscia corymbosa Gilg
- Boscia fadeniorum Fici
- Boscia filipes Gilg
- Boscia firma Radlk.
- Boscia foetida Schinz
- Boscia longifolia Hadj-Moust.
- Boscia longipedicellata Gilg.
- Boscia madagascariensis (DC.) Hadj-Moust.
- Boscia microphylla Oliv.
- Boscia minimifolia Chiov.
- Boscia mossambicensis Klotzsch
- Boscia octandra Hochst. ex Radlk.
- Boscia oleoides (Burch. ex DC.) Toelken
- Boscia pestalozziana Glig
- Boscia peuchellii Kuntze
- Boscia plantefolii Hadj-Moust.
- Boscia polyantha sensu Roessler
- Boscia rautanenii Schinz
- Boscia rehmanniana Pestal.
- Boscia reticulata Hochst. ex A. Rich.
- Boscia rotundifolia Pax
- Boscia salicifolia Oliv.
- Boscia senegalensis (Pers.) Lam. ex Poir.
- Boscia tenuifolia A. Chev.
- Boscia tomentella Chiov.
- Boscia tomentosa Toelken
- Boscia transvaalensis Pest.
- Boscia weltwitschii Gilg
