= Boscia salicifolia =

Scientific classification
- Kingdom: Plantae
- Clade: Tracheophytes
- Clade: Angiosperms
- Clade: Eudicots
- Clade: Rosids
- Order: Brassicales
- Family: Capparaceae
- Genus: Boscia
- Species: B. salicifolia

Binomial name
- Boscia salicifolia Oliv.

Synonyms
- Boscia powellii Sprague & M.L.Green; Boscia stylosa Gilg & Gilg-Ben

Species of plant native to Tanzania

Boscia salicifolia is a deciduous tree with narrowly ovate to linear leaves that grows up to 12 meters in height, it is within the Capparaceae family.

== Description ==
It is a dark-grey barked short to medium sized tree with a short but brittle trunk, the bark is often scaly or rough with white lenticels; it sometimes has dropping branches with drooping leaves. Leaves, alternate, with a leathery surface, commonly glabrous above with short fine hairs beneath; leaf-blade is narrowly ovate to linear; petiole is 8-15 mm long. Inflorescence is an axillary raceme or panicle; flowers are green to yellowish in color. Fruit is a spherical berry.

== Distribution ==
Occurs in the Sahel and Sudan savannah vegetations of West Africa, eastwards towards Somalia and southwards towards Botswana and Mozambique. Common on termite mounds, dry lands, hills, ironstone and sandy soils.

== Chemistry ==
Test on the leaves of the species identified the presence of flavonoid glycosides including, rhamnetin 3-O-b-neohesperidoside, rhamnocitrin 3-0-b-glucopyranoside and rhamnetin 3-0-b-glucopyranoside.

== Uses ==
In some parts of Africa, the leaves of Boscia salicifolia are prepared as a vegetable soup. In traditional medical practice, plant extracts are utilized to help heal wounds, used as a dewormer and as a decoction to treat tuberculosis, joint pains and ear infections. Root bark extracts is used as an aphrodisiac.
