= Qaziabad, Kerman =

Qaziabad قاضي اباد
- Village
- Location within Iran
- Coordinates: 30°39′22″N 54°55′02″E
- Country: Iran
- Province: Kerman
- County: Shahr-e Babak
- Bakhsh: Dehaj
- Rural District: Dehaj

Population (2006)
  - Total: 29
- Time zone: UTC+3:30 (IRST)
  - Summer (DST): UTC+4:30 (IRDT)

Qaziabad (Persian: قاضي اباد, also Romanized as Qāẕīābād) is a village in Dehaj Rural District, Dehaj District, Shahr-e Babak County, Kerman Province, Iran. At the 2006 census, its population was 29, in 9 families.
