= Mazayjan District =

District in Fars province, Iran

Mazayjan District Persian: بخش مزایجان
- District
- Location within Iran
- Coordinates: 30°22′31″N 53°48′00″E
- Country: Iran
- Province: Fars
- County: Bavanat
- Capital: Mazayjan

Population (2016)
  - Total: 10,591
- Time zone: UTC+3:30 (IRST)

Mazayjan District (Persian: بخش مزایجان) is in Bavanat County, Fars province, Iran. Its capital is the city of Mazayjan.

== History ==
After the 2006 National Census, Mazayjan and Sarvestan Rural Districts were separated from the Central District in the formation of Mazayjan District. After the 2011 census, the village of Mazayjan was elevated to the status of a city.

== Demographics ==
=== Population ===
At the time of the 2011 census, the district's population was 8,974 people in 2,740 households. The 2016 census measured the population of the district as 10,591 inhabitants in 3,487 households.

=== Administrative divisions ===
Mazayjan District Population
| Administrative Divisions | 2011 | 2016 |
|---|---|---|
| Mazayjan RD | 5,251 | 2,985 |
| Sarvestan RD | 3,723 | 4,039 |
| Mazayjan (city) | | 3,567 |
| Total | 8,974 | 10,591 |
RD = Rural District
