= Baghestan Rural District (Bavanat County) =

Rural district in Fars province, Iran

Baghestan Rural District Persian: دهستان باغستان
- Rural District
- Location within Iran
- Coordinates: 30°33′25″N 53°34′03″E
- Country: Iran
- Province: Fars
- County: Bavanat
- District: Central
- Capital: Jeshnian

Population (2016)
  - Total: 4,410
- Time zone: UTC+3:30 (IRST)

Baghestan Rural District (Persian: دهستان باغستان) is in the Central District of Bavanat County, Fars province, Iran. Its capital is the village of Jeshnian.

== Demographics ==
=== Population ===
At the time of the 2006 National Census, the rural district's population was 4,200 in 1,078 households. There were 3,913 inhabitants in 1,116 households at the following census of 2011. The 2016 census measured the population of the rural district as 4,410 in 1,401 households. The most populous of its 47 villages was Fakhrabad, with 1,082 people.
