= Mazayjan Rural District =

Rural district in Fars province, Iran

Mazayjan Rural District Persian: دهستان مزايجان
- Rural District
- Location within Iran
- Coordinates: 30°14′50″N 53°47′37″E
- Country: Iran
- Province: Fars
- County: Bavanat
- District: Mazayjan
- Capital: Mazayjan

Population (2016)
  - Total: 2,985
- Time zone: UTC+3:30 (IRST)

Mazayjan Rural District (Persian: دهستان مزايجان) is in Mazayjan District of Bavanat County, Fars province, Iran. It is administered from the city of Mazayjan.

== Demographics ==
=== Population ===
At the time of the 2006 National Census, the rural district's population (as a part of the Central District) was 5,440 in 1,460 households. There were 5,251 inhabitants in 1,577 households at the following census of 2011, by which time the rural district had been separated from the district in the formation of Mazayjan District. The 2016 census measured the population of the rural district as 2,985 in 941 households. The most populous of its 52 villages was Badbar, with 844 people.
