= Simakan Rural District =

Rural district in Fars province, Iran

Simakan Rural District Persian: دهستان سيمكان
- Rural District
- Location within Iran
- Coordinates: 30°25′12″N 53°31′38″E
- Country: Iran
- Province: Fars
- County: Bavanat
- District: Central
- Capital: Simakan

Population (2016)
  - Total: 2,512
- Time zone: UTC+3:30 (IRST)

Simakan Rural District (Persian: دهستان سيمكان) is in the Central District of Bavanat County, Fars province, Iran. Its capital is the village of Simakan.

== Demographics ==
=== Population ===
At the time of the 2006 National Census, the rural district's population was 2,047 in 522 households. There were 1,859 inhabitants in 572 households at the following census of 2011. The 2016 census measured the population of the rural district as 2,512 in 834 households. The most populous of its 44 villages was Simakan, with 410 people.
