= Sarvestan Rural District (Bavanat County) =

Rural district in Fars province, Iran

Sarvestan Rural District Persian: دهستان سروستان
- Rural District
- Location within Iran
- Coordinates: 30°26′12″N 53°49′00″E
- Country: Iran
- Province: Fars
- County: Bavanat
- District: Mazayjan
- Capital: Sarvestan

Population (2016)
  - Total: 4,039
- Time zone: UTC+3:30 (IRST)

Sarvestan Rural District (Persian: دهستان سروستان) is in Mazayjan District of Bavanat County, Fars province, Iran. Its capital is the village of Sarvestan.

== Demographics ==
=== Population ===
At the time of the 2006 National Census, the rural district's population (as a part of the Central District) was 3,804 in 1,074 households. There were 3,723 inhabitants in 1,163 households at the following census of 2011, by which time the rural district had been separated from the district in the establishment of Mazayjan District. The 2016 census measured the population of the rural district as 4,039 in 1,353 households. The most populous of its 22 villages was Monj-e Olya, with 820 people.
