= Central District (Bavanat County) =

District in Fars province, Iran

Central District (Bavanat County) Persian: بخش مرکزی شهرستان بوانات
- District
- Location within Iran
- Coordinates: 30°31′37″N 53°34′03″E
- Country: Iran
- Province: Fars
- County: Bavanat
- Capital: Bavanat

Population (2016)
  - Total: 16,698
- Time zone: UTC+3:30 (IRST)

The Central District of Bavanat County (Persian: بخش مرکزی شهرستان بوانات) is in Fars province, Iran. Its capital is the city of Bavanat. (Note: Formerly Surian)

== History ==
After the 2006 National Census, Mazayjan and Sarvestan Rural Districts were separated from the district in the formation of Mazayjan District.

== Demographics ==
=== Population ===
At the time of the 2006 census, the district's population was 25,136 in 6,772 households. The following census in 2011 counted 16,442 people in 4,718 households. The 2016 census measured the population of the district as 16,698 inhabitants in 5,210 households.

=== Administrative divisions ===
Central District (Bavanat County) Population
Administrative Divisions	2006	2011	2016
Baghestan RD	4,200	3,913	4,410
Mazayjan RD (Note: Became a part of Mazayjan District)	5,440		
Sarvestan RD	3,804		
Simakan RD	2,047	1,859	2,512
Bavanat (city)	9,645	10,670	9,776
Total	25,136	16,442	16,698
RD = Rural District
