= Bavanat County =

County in Fars province, Iran

Bavanat County Persian: شهرستان بوانات
- County
- Location of Bavanat County in Fars province (top right, yellow)

- Location of Fars province in Iran
- Coordinates: 30°26′N 53°31′E
- Country: Iran
- Province: Fars
- Capital: Bavanat
- Districts: Central, Mazayjan

Population (2016)
  - Total: 50,418
- Time zone: UTC+3:30 (IRST)

Bavanat County (Persian: شهرستان بوانات) is in Fars province, Iran. Its capital is the city of Bavanat. (Note: Formerly Surian (سوریان))

== History ==
After the 2006 National Census, Mazayjan and Sarvestan Rural Districts were separated from the Central District in the formation of Mazayjan District. In addition, the village of Hesami was elevated to the status of a city. After the 2011 census, the village of Mazayjan rose to city status as well.

In 2018, Sarchehan District was separated from the county in the establishment of Sarchehan County.

== Demographics ==
=== Population ===
At the time of the 2006 census, the county's population was 44,069 in 11,341 households. The following census in 2011 counted 48,416 people in 13,636 households. The 2016 census measured the population of the county as 50,418 in 15,874 households.

مردم این شهرستان اصالتا از قوم پارس میباشند

=== Administrative divisions ===
Bavanat County's population history and administrative structure over three consecutive censuses are shown in the following table.

Bavanat County Population
Administrative Divisions	2006	2011	2016
Central District	25,136	16,442	16,698
Baghestan RD	4,200	3,913	4,410
Mazayjan RD	5,440		
Sarvestan RD	3,804		
Simakan RD	2,047	1,859	2,512
Bavanat (city)	9,645	10,670	9,776
Mazayjan District		8,974	10,591
Mazayjan RD		5,251	2,985
Sarvestan RD		3,723	4,039
Mazayjan (city)			3,567
Sarchehan District (Note: Became a part of Sarchehan County after the 2016 census)	18,933	22,492	23,129
Bagh Safa RD	4,432	5,203	5,004
Sarchehan RD	5,002	2,925	3,703
Tujerdi RD	6,341	7,626	7,337
Hesami (city)		2,826	3,131
Korehi (city)	3,158	3,912	3,954
Total	44,069	48,416	50,418
RD = Rural District

== See also ==
Media related to Bavanat County at Wikimedia Commons
