= Qasimabad =

Qasimabad or Qasemabad or Qasem Abad (Persian: قاسم‌آباد, Urdu: قاسم آباد) may refer to:

== India ==
- Kasimabad, Ghazipur, town and subdistrict (tehsil) in Uttar Pradesh
  - Qasimabad Estate
  - Qasimabad Fort

== Iran ==
=== Alborz Province ===
- Qasemabad-e Aqa, village in Savojbolagh County
- Qasemabad-e Bozorg, village in Savojbolagh County
- Qasemabad-e Gorji, village in Nazarabad County
- Qasemabad-e Kuchek, village in Nazarabad County

=== Ardabil Province ===
- Qasemabad, Ardabil, a village in Parsabad County

=== Chaharmahal and Bakhtiari Province ===
- Qasemabad, Chaharmahal and Bakhtiari, a village in Kuhrang County

=== Fars Province ===
- Qasemabad, Bagh Safa, a village in Bavanat County
- Qasemabad, Tujerdi, a village in Bavanat County
- Qasemabad-e Bikheh Deraz, a village in Fasa County
- Qasemabad-e Olya, Fars, a village in Fasa County
- Qasemabad-e Sofla, Fars, a village in Fasa County
- Qasemabad, Marvdasht, a village in Marvdasht County
- Qasemabad, Naqsh-e Rostam, a village in Marvdasht County
- Qasemabad, Neyriz, a village in Neyriz County
- Qasemabad, Sepidan, a village in Sepidan County

=== Gilan Province ===
- Qasemabad-e Olya, Gilan, a village in Rudsar County
- Qasemabad-e Sofla, Gilan, a village in Rudsar County
- Pain Mahalleh-ye Qasemabad, a village in Rudsar County

=== Golestan Province ===
- Qasemabad-e Yolmeh Salian, a village in Aqqala County

=== Hamadan Province ===
- Qasemabad, Asadabad, a village in Asadabad County
- Qasemabad-e Laklak, a village in Asadabad County
- Qasemabad, Hamadan, a village in Hamadan County
- Qasemabad, Tuyserkan, a village in Tuyserkan County

=== Hormozgan Province ===
- Qasemabad, Hormozgan, a village in Parsian County

=== Ilam Province ===
- Qasemabad, Ilam, a village in Shirvan and Chardaval County

=== Isfahan Province ===
- Qasemabad, Aran va Bidgol, a village in Aran va Bidgol County
- Qasemabad, Shahin Shahr and Meymeh, a village in Shahin Shahr and Meymeh County
- Qasemabad, Tiran and Karvan, a village in Tiran and Karvan County

=== Kerman Province ===
- Qasemabad, Anbarabad, a village in Anbarabad County
- Qasemabad, Hoseynabad, a village in Anbarabad County
- Qasemabad, Narmashir, a village in Narmashir County
- Qasemabad, Rafsanjan, a village in Rafsanjan County
- Qasemabad, Koshkuiyeh, a village in Rafsanjan County
- Qasemabad-e Deh Panah, a village in Rafsanjan County
- Qasemabad Rural District, in Rafsanjan County
- Qasemabad-e Pir Almas, a village in Rigan County
- Qasemabad, Rudbar-e Jonubi, a village Rudbar-e Jonubi County
- Qasemabad, Sirjan, a village in Sirjan County

=== Kermanshah Province ===
- Qasemabad, Gilan-e Gharb, a village in Gilan-e Gharb County
- Qasemabad, Qazvineh, a village in Kangavar County

=== Khuzestan Province ===
- Qasemabad, Andika, a village in Andika County
- Qasemabad, Masjed Soleyman, a village in Masjed Soleyman County

=== Kohgiluyeh and Boyer-Ahmad Province ===
- Qasemabad-e Jalil, a village in Boyer-Ahmad County

=== Kurdistan Province ===
- Qasemabad, Bijar, a village in Bijar County
- Qasemabad, Kurdistan, a village in Qorveh County

=== Lorestan Province ===
- Qasimabad, alternate name of Tian, Azna, a village in Azna County
- Qasemabad-e Cheshmeh Barqi, village in Selseleh County
- Qasemabad, Aligudarz, village in Aligudarz County
- Qasemabad, Khorramabad, village in Khorramabad County

=== Markazi Province ===
- Qasemabad, Arak, village in Arak County
- Qasemabad, Khomeyn, village in Khomeyn County
- Qasemabad, Tafresh, village in Tafresh County
- Qasemabad-e Olya, village in Zarandieh County
- Qasemabad-e Sofla, Markazi, village in Zarandieh County

=== Mazandaran Province ===
- Qasemabad, Mazandaran, a village in Nur County

=== North Khorasan Province ===
- Qasemabad, North Khorasan, village in Esfarayen County

=== Qazvin Province ===
- Qasemabad, Qazvin (disambiguation), villages in Qazvin County
- Qasemabad, Takestan, village in Takestan County
- Qasemabad, Khorramdasht, village in Takestan County

=== Razavi Khorasan Province ===
- Qasemabad, Bajestan, a village in Bajestan County
- Qasemabad, Bardaskan, a village in Bardaskan County
- Qasemabad, Fariman, a village in Fariman County
- Qasemabad, Khaf, a city in Khvaf County
- Qasemabad, Mashhad, a village in Mashhad County
- Qasemabad, Piveh Zhan, a village in Mashhad County
- Qasemabad, Razaviyeh, a village in Mashhad County
- Qasemabad, Tus, a village in Mashhad County
- Qasemabad, Nishapur, a village in Nishapur County
- Qasemabad, Miyan Jolgeh, a village in Nishapur County
- Qasemabad, Quchan, a village in Quchan County
- Qasemabad, Sarakhs, a village in Sarakhs County
- Qasemabad, Torbat-e Jam, a village in Torbat-e Jam County

=== Semnan Province ===
- Qasemabad, Damghan, a village in Damghan County
- Qasemabad-e Khanlar Khan, a village in Shahrud County

=== Sistan and Baluchestan Province ===
- Qasemabad, Bampur, a village in Bampur County
- Qasemabad, Chabahar, a village in Chabahar County
- Qasemabad-e Gonbad, a village in Dalgan County

=== South Khorasan Province ===
- Qasemabad, Darmian, a village in Darmian County

=== Tehran Province ===
- Qasemabad, Pishva, village in Pishva County
- Ghasemabad, a quarter of Eslamshahr city
- Qasemabad-e Akhavan, village in Varamin County
- Qasemabad-e Eskander Beyk, village in Varamin County
- Qasemabad-e Qanat Shur, village in Rey County
- Qasemabad-e Shurabad, village in Rey County
- Qasemabad-e Tehranchi, village in Rey County
- Qaleh-ye Qasemabad, village in Varamin County

=== Yazd Province ===
- Qasemabad, Khatam, a village in Khatam County

=== Zanjan Province ===
- Qasemabad, Zanjan, a village in Mahneshan County

== Pakistan ==
- Qasimabad, Hyderabad, a town in Hyderabad, Sindh
  - Qasimabad Taluka, administrative subdivision (taluka) of Hyderabad District
- Qasimabad, Karachi, a neighbourhood in Karachi, Sindh
- Qasimabad, Punjab in Sahiwal District, Punjab

== See also ==
- Qasimpur (disambiguation), a related name also referring to several places
- Kazemabad (disambiguation), a different name also referring to several places
- Kalateh-ye Qasemabad (disambiguation)
