= Kazemabad =

Kazemabad or Kazimabad or Kazmabad (Persian: كاظم آباد) may refer to:

== Azerbaijan ==
- Kazımabad, a municipality in Azerbaijan

== Iran ==
=== Alborz Province ===
- Kazemabad, Alborz, a village in Nazarabad County

=== Ardabil Province ===
- Kazemabad, Ardabil, a village in Meshgin Shahr County

=== Fars Province ===
- Kazemabad, Darab, a village in Darab County
- Kazemabad, Fasa, a village in Fasa County
- Kazemabad, Sepidan, a village in Sepidan County

=== Gilan Province ===
- Kazemabad, Gilan, a village in Shaft County

=== Kerman Province ===
- Kazemabad, Kerman, a city in Kerman County
- Kazemabad, Bezenjan, a village in Baft County
- Kazemabad, Dashtab, a village in Baft County
- Kazemabad, Fahraj, a village in Fahraj County
- Kazemabad, Shahdad, a village in Kerman County
- Kazemabad, Rafsanjan, a village in Rafsanjan County
- Kazemabad, Kabutar Khan, a village in Rafsanjan County
- Kazemabad, Zeydabad, a village in Sirjan County

=== Kurdistan Province ===
- Kazemabad, Kamyaran, a village in Kamyaran County
- Kazemabad, Qorveh, a village in Qorveh County

=== Lorestan Province ===
- Kazemabad, Aligudarz, a village in Aligudarz County
- Kazemabad, Mirbag-e Jonubi, a village in Delfan County
- Kazemabad, Mirbag-e Shomali, a village in Delfan County
- Kazemabad, Nurabad, a village in Delfan County
- Kazemabad, Kuhdasht, a village in Kuhdasht County
- Kazemabad, Selseleh, a village in Selseleh County
- Kazemabad, alternate name of Aliabad-e Bar Anazar, a village in Selseleh County

=== Markazi Province ===
- Kazemabad, Farahan, a village in Farahan County
- Kazemabad, Khomeyn, a village in Khomeyn County
- Kazemabad, Saveh, a village in Saveh County

=== Mazandaran Province ===
- Kazemabad, Mazandaran, a village in Tonekabon County

=== Razavi Khorasan Province ===
- Kazemabad, Bardaskan, a village in Bardaskan County
- Kazemabad, Mashhad, a village in Mashhad County
- Kazemabad-e Panjshanbeh, a village in Mashhad County
- Kazemabad, Nishapur, a village in Nishapur County
- Kazemabad, Zeberkhan, a village in Nishapur County
- Kazemabad, Rashtkhvar, a village in Rashtkhvar County

=== South Khorasan Province ===
- Kazemabad, South Khorasan, a village in Tabas County

=== Tehran Province ===
- Kazemabad, Tehran, a village in Robat Karim County

== See also ==
- Qasimabad (disambiguation), a different name also referring to several places
