= Mohammadabad, Sarchehan =

Village in Fars province, Iran

Mohammadabad Persian: قنات ابراهيم
- Village
- Location within Iran
- Coordinates: 30°10′04″N 53°31′31″E
- Country: Iran
- Province: Fars
- County: Sarchehan
- District: Bagh Safa
- Rural District: Arzhang

Population (2016)
  - Total: 55
- Time zone: UTC+3:30 (IRST)

Mohammadabad (Persian: محمداباد) (Note: Also romanized as Moḩammadābād) is a village in Arzhang Rural District of Bagh Safa District, Sarchehan County, Fars province, Iran.

== Demographics ==
=== Population ===
At the time of the 2006 National Census, the village's population was 93 in 19 households, when it was in Sarchehan Rural District of the former Sarchehan District of Bavanat County. The following census in 2011 counted 72 people in 18 households. The 2016 census measured the population of the village as 55 people in 16 households.

After the census, the district was separated from the county in the establishment of Sarchehan County, and the rural district was transferred to the new Central District. Mohammadabad was transferred to Arzhang Rural District created in the new Bagh Safa District.
