= Qanat Ebrahim =

Village in Fars province, Iran

Qanat Ebrahim Persian: قنات ابراهيم
- Village
- Location within Iran
- Coordinates: 30°06′11″N 53°38′15″E
- Country: Iran
- Province: Fars
- County: Sarchehan
- District: Bagh Safa
- Rural District: Arzhang

Population (2016)
  - Total: 591
- Time zone: UTC+3:30 (IRST)

Qanat Ebrahim (Persian: قنات ابراهيم) (Note: Also romanized as Qanāt Ebrāhīm) is a village in, and the capital of, Arzhang Rural District of Bagh Safa District, Sarchehan County, Fars province, Iran.

== Demographics ==
=== Population ===
At the time of the 2006 National Census, the village's population was 476 in 100 households, when it was in Sarchehan Rural District of the former Sarchehan District of Bavanat County. The following census in 2011 counted 474 people in 122 households. The 2016 census measured the population of the village as 591 people in 176 households.

After the census, the district was separated from the county in the establishment of Sarchehan County, and the rural district was transferred to the new Central District. Qanat Ebrahim was transferred to Arzhang Rural District created in the new Bagh Safa District.
