= Marvashkan =

Village in Fars province, Iran

Marvashkan Persian: مروشكان
- Village
- Location within Iran
- Coordinates: 29°55′41″N 53°56′02″E
- Country: Iran
- Province: Fars
- County: Sarchehan
- District: Tujerdi
- Rural District: Marvashkan

Population (2016)
  - Total: 1,644
- Time zone: UTC+3:30 (IRST)

Marvashkan (Persian: مروشكان) (Note: Also romanized as Marvashkān and Marveshkān) is a village in, and the capital of, Marvashkan Rural District of Tujerdi District, Sarchehan County, Fars province, Iran.

== Demographics ==
=== Population ===
At the time of the 2006 National Census, the village's population was 1,361 in 318 households, when it was in Tujerdi Rural District of the former Sarchehan District of Bavanat County. The following census in 2011 counted 1,506 people in 448 households. The 2016 census measured the population of the village as 1,644 people in 523 households.

After the census, Sarchehan District was separated from Bavanat County in the establishment of Sarchehan County, and the rural district was transferred to the new Central District. After formation of the county, Tujerdi Rural District was separated from the district in the formation of Tujerdi District. Marvashkan was transferred to Marvashkan Rural District created in the new district.
