= Qasim (name) =

- Pronunciation: Arabic: [ˈqaː.sɪm] Persian: [ɢɒːˈsem] Kazakh: [ˈqaː.səm]
- Gender: Male

Origin
- Origin: Arabic
- Meaning: one who distributes

Other names
- Alternative spelling: Qāsim: Qaasim, Quazeem, Qazeem, Quasem, Quasim, Casim, Cassim, Kacem, Kasem, Kassem, Kassim, Kassym, Qasem, Kasim, Qassim, Ghasem, Kassam; Qasīm: Qazeem, Kaseem, Kasseem, Qaseem, Kazim, Kashem, Qazim
- Related names: Abu al-Qasim

Qasim, Kassem or Qasem is the transliteration of the male given name (Arabic: قاسم, Qāsim), pronounced with a long first syllable. The meaning is one who distributes. The first known bearer of the name was the son of the Islamic prophet Muhammad, Qasim ibn Muhammad.

There is an occasional variant spelling, (Arabic: قسیم, Qasīm), distinguished by a long second syllable. Both names can also be used as surnames.

== In arts and entertainment ==
=== In literature ===
- Gasim bey Zakir (1784–1857), Azerbaijani poet
- Kacem El Ghazzali (born 1990), Moroccan-Swiss author and atheism activist
- Qasim Tawfiq, Jordanian novelist and short story writer
- Qasem-e Anvar (1356–1433), Iranian Sufi poet
- Mehdi Belhaj Kacem (born 1973), French-Tunisian actor, philosopher, and writer
- Pirzada Qasim (born 1943), Pakistani scholar, Urdu poet, scientist and educator
- Awn Alsharif Qasim (1933–2006), Sudanese writer

=== In music ===
- Kasim Sulton (born 1955), American bass guitarist
- Kasseem Dean (born 1978), better known by his stage name, Swizz Beatz, American record producer

=== In other arts ===
- Casey Kasem (1932–2014), American radio personality and voice actor
- Jean Kasem (born 1954), American actress
- KassemG or Kassem Gharaibeh, American comedian
- Kerri Kasem (born 1978), American radio and television host
- Mehrab Ghasem Khani (born 1970), Iranian film writer
- Peyman Ghasem Khani (born 1966), Iranian film screenwriter and actor
- Qasim Melho (born 1968), Syrian television and theatre actor
- Saiful Azam Kashem (1947–2019), Bangladeshi film director

== In government and politics ==
- Al-Qasim ibn Harun al-Rashid was the third son of the Abbasid caliph Harun al-Rashid (r. 786–809), and for a time third-in-line (Heir presumptive) to the Abbasid Caliphate.
- Abd al-Karim Qasim (1914–1963), Prime Minister of Iraq from July 1958 to February 1963
- Abdullah Kassim Hanga (1932–1969), Zanzibar Prime Minister
- Cassim Chilumpha (born 1958), Malawian politician
- George A. Kasem (1919–2002), American congressional representative
- Ghasem Sholeh-Saadi, Iranian politician
- Ismail Qasim Naji, Somali politician
- Kasım Gülek (1905–1996), Turkish statesman
- Kasim Reed (born 1969), Democratic politician and the 59th Mayor of Atlanta
- Kasim Uddin Ahmed, Bangladeshi politician
- Kassim al-Rimawi (1918–1982), prime minister of Jordan in 1980
- Kasym Khan (1445–1521), ruler of the Kazakh Khanate
- Kassym-Jomart Tokayev, Kazakh president.
- Maryam Kassim, Somali politician
- Mir Qasim (died 1777), Nawab of Bengal
- Mir Quasem Ali (1952–2016), Bangladeshi businessman, philanthropist and politician
- Mir Quasem Mondal (1931–2024), West Bengali politician
- Qasim I of Astrakhan (ruled ca. 1470–1500), Khan of Astrakhan
- Qasim II of Astrakhan (died 1532), Khan of Astrakhan
- Qasim Khan (died 1469), first khan of the Qasim Khanate
- Rafiq Belhaj Kacem, Tunisian politician
- Suleiman Kassim, Nigerian politician
- Syarif Kasim II, sultan of Siak Indrapura
- Syed Mir Qasim (1921–2004), Chief Minister of Jammu and Kashmir
- Wajeeh Qassim (1938–2002), Palestinian politician and diplomat
- Yahya Kassim Issa, Tanzanian politician

== In military and combat ==
- Kassem Daher, Lebanese-Canadian Islamic militant
- Muhammad bin Qasim Al-Thaqafi (695–715), Umayyad general who conquered Sindh
- Qassem Al-Nasser (1925–2007), Jordanian officer who participated in the 1948 Arab-Israeli War
- Qassem Khan Vali (1878–1935), known as Sardar Homayoun, Iranian army general, trained in France
- Qasem Soleimani (1957–2020), Iranian commander of the Quds Force
- Tal'at Fu'ad Qasim (died 1995), Egyptian leader of militant Gama'a Islamiyya organization
- Naim Qassem (born 1953), secretary-general of Hezbollah

== In religion ==
=== Religious figures in early Islam ===
- Qasim ibn Muhammad (died 605), son of Muhammad and Khadijah bint Khuwaylid
- Qasim ibn Muhammad ibn Abi Bakr (died ca. 728), jurist in early Islam
- Qasim ibn Hasan (ca. 666–680), son of Hasan ibn Ali and grandson of Muhammad

=== Modern religious figures ===
- Isa Qassim (born 1937), Bahraini Ayatollah
- Muhammad Qasim Nanotvi (1833–1880), Indian Islamic scholar and social activist
- Qasem Taei (born 1960), Iraqi Twelver Shi'a Marja (grand ayatollah)

== In sport ==
=== In football (soccer) ===
- Ashraf Kasem (born 1966), Egyptian footballer
- Dollah Kassim (1949–2010), Singaporean footballer
- Ghasem Dehnavi (born 1981), Iranian footballer
- Ghasem Haddadifar (born 1983), Iranian footballer
- Kaseem Sinceno (born 1976), American football player
- Kasım Yıldız (born 1980), Turkish footballer
- Kassem El Zein (born 1990), Lebanese footballer
- Kassim Guyazou (born 1982), Togolese footballer
- Kassim Osgood (born 1980), American footballer
- Mehdi Kacem (born 1986), Algerian footballer
- Qasem Burhan (born 1985), Qatari footballer
- Yaser Kasim (born 1991), Iraqi footballer

=== In other sports ===
- Ghasem Rezaei (born 1985), Iranian wrestler
- Iqbal Qasim (born 1953), Pakistani cricketer
- Mir Khasim Ali (born 1940), Hyderabadi table tennis player
- Kassem Ibadulla (born 1964), New Zealand cricketer
- Kassim Osgood (born 1980), American football player
- Kassim Ouma (born 1978), Ugandan boxer

== In other fields ==
- Qasim ibn Abdallah al-Manṣūr, was an Abbasid prince, youngest son of caliph al-Mansur (r. 754–775).
- Muhammad Qasim (1575–1659), Persian miniaturist)
- Qasim Amin (1863–1908), Egyptian jurist, early advocate of women's rights
- Leyla Qasim (1952–1974), executed Iraqi Kurdish activist
- Kassim Basma (born 1960), Sierra Leonean businessman
- Peter Qasim (born 1974), Indian detained by Australian immigration
- Yasin Qasem Muhammad Ismail (born ca. 1979), Yemeni held in Guantanamo
- Kasem Chatikavanich, Thai business leader
- Nazar Mohamed Kassim, Singaporean convicted murderer
- Syed Zahoor Qasim, Indian marine biologist

== Derived words ==
- Qasimabad, name of multiple places
- Qasimpur, name of multiple places
- Qasimiyeh, name of multiple places
- Al Qasimi family
- Qasimiya, Sufi order
- Qasimid State
- Qasimid
- Qasimism
