= Aliabad, Sarchehan =

Village in Fars province, Iran

Aliabad Persian: علی‌آباد
- Village
- Location within Iran
- Coordinates: 30°11′49″N 53°33′45″E
- Country: Iran
- Province: Fars
- County: Sarchehan
- District: Bagh Safa
- Rural District: Bagh Safa

Population (2016)
  - Total: 0
- Time zone: UTC+3:30 (IRST)

Aliabad (Persian: علی‌آباد) (Note: Also romanized as 'Alīābād) is a village in Bagh Safa Rural District of Bagh Safa District, Sarchehan County, Fars province, Iran.

== Demographics ==
=== Population ===
At the time of the 2006 National Census, the village's population was 45 in 8 households, when it was in the former Sarchehan District of Bavanat County. The village did not appear in the following census of 2011. The 2016 census measured the population of the village as zero.

After the census, the district was separated from the county in the establishment of Sarchehan County, and the rural district was transferred to the new Bagh Safa District.
