= Marvashkan Rural District =

Rural district in Fars province, Iran

Marvashkan Rural District Persian: دهستان مروشکان
- Rural District
- Location within Iran
- Coordinates: 29°52′34″N 53°58′08″E
- Country: Iran
- Province: Fars
- County: Sarchehan
- District: Tujerdi
- Capital: Marvashkan
- Time zone: UTC+3:30 (IRST)

Marvashkan Rural District (Persian: دهستان مروشکان) is in Tujerdi District of Sarchehan County, Fars province, Iran. Its capital is the village of Marvashkan, whose population at the time of the 2016 National Census was 1,644 in 523 households.

== History ==
After the 2016 census, Sarchehan District was separated from Bavanat County in the establishment of Sarchehan County. After formation of the county, Tujerdi Rural District was separated from the Central District in the formation of Tujerdi District, and Marvashkan Rural District was created in the new district.
