= Kupan =

Village in Fars province, Iran

Kupan Persian: كوپان
- Village
- Location within Iran
- Coordinates: 30°17′08″N 53°35′18″E
- Country: Iran
- Province: Fars
- County: Sarchehan
- District: Bagh Safa
- Rural District: Bagh Safa

Population (2016)
  - Total: 925
- Time zone: UTC+3:30 (IRST)

Kupan (Persian: كوپان) (Note: Also romanized as Kūpān; also known as Kūyān) is a village in Bagh Safa Rural District of Bagh Safa District, Sarchehan County, Fars province, Iran.

== Demographics ==
=== Population ===
At the time of the 2006 National Census, the village's population was 837 in 206 households, when it was in the former Sarchehan District of Bavanat County. The following census in 2011 counted 938 people in 270 households. The 2016 census measured the population of the village as 925 people in 308 households. It was the most populous village in its rural district.

After the census, the district was separated from the county in the establishment of Sarchehan County, and the rural district was transferred to the new Bagh Safa District.
