= Jamalabad, Sarchehan =

Village in Fars province, Iran

Jamalabad Persian: جمال اباد
- Village
- Location within Iran
- Coordinates: 29°59′53″N 53°46′58″E
- Country: Iran
- Province: Fars
- County: Sarchehan
- District: Central
- Rural District: Hesami

Population (2016)
  - Total: 724
- Time zone: UTC+3:30 (IRST)

Jamalabad (Persian: جمال اباد) (Note: Also romanized as Jamālābād) is a village in, and the capital of, Hesami Rural District of the Central District of Sarchehan County, Fars province, Iran.

== Demographics ==
=== Population ===
At the time of the 2006 National Census, the village's population was 494 in 123 households, when it was in Sarchehan Rural District of the former Sarchehan District of Bavanat County. The following census in 2011 counted 641 people in 168 households. The 2016 census measured the population of the village as 724 people in 221 households. It was the most populous village in its rural district.

After the census, the district was separated from the county in the establishment of Sarchehan County, and the rural district was transferred to the new Central District. Jamalabad was transferred to Hesami Rural District created in the district.
