= Siyahun =

Village in Fars province, Iran

Siyahun Persian: سياهون
- Village
- Location within Iran
- Coordinates: 30°05′08″N 53°39′36″E
- Country: Iran
- Province: Fars
- County: Sarchehan
- District: Central
- Rural District: Sarchehan

Population (2016)
  - Total: 174
- Time zone: UTC+3:30 (IRST)

Siyahun (Persian: سياهون) (Note: Also romanized as Sīyāhūn; also known as Sīāhū) is a village in, and the capital of, Sarchehan Rural District of the Central District of Sarchehan County, Fars province, Iran. The previous capital of the rural district was the village of Korehi, now a city.

== Demographics ==
=== Population ===
At the time of the 2006 National Census, the village's population was 176 in 34 households, when it was in the former Sarchehan District of Bavanat County. The following census in 2011 counted 164 people in 39 households. The 2016 census measured the population of the village as 174 people in 51 households.

After the census, the district was separated from the county in the establishment of Sarchehan County, and the rural district was transferred to the new Central District.
