= Borazjan, Fars =

Borazjan برازجان
- Village
- Location within Iran
- Coordinates: 29°55′26″N 54°04′12″E
- Country: Iran
- Province: Fars
- County: Bavanat
- Bakhsh: Sarchehan
- Rural District: Tujerdi

Population (2006)
  - Total: 200
- Time zone: UTC+3:30 (IRST)
  - Summer (DST): UTC+4:30 (IRDT)

Borazjan (Persian: برازجان, also Romanized as Borāzjān; also known as Qal‘eh Bārāzjun and Qal‘eh-ye Borāzjān) is a village in Tujerdi Rural District, Sarchehan District, Bavanat County, Fars province, Iran. At the 2006 census, its population was 200, in 39 families.
