= Shahzadeh Abu ol Qasem =

Shahzadeh Abu ol Qasem شاهزاده ابوالقاسم
- Village
- Location within Iran
- Coordinates: 30°08′35″N 53°43′00″E
- Country: Iran
- Province: Fars
- County: Bavanat
- Bakhsh: Sarchehan
- Rural District: Sarchehan

Population (2006)
  - Total: 46
- Time zone: UTC+3:30 (IRST)
  - Summer (DST): UTC+4:30 (IRDT)

Shahzadeh Abu ol Qasem (Persian: شاهزاده ابوالقاسم, also Romanized as Shāhzādeh Abū ol Qāsem; also known as Shāh 'Abdol Qāsem and Shāh 'Abdul Qāsim) is a village in Sarchehan Rural District, Sarchehan District, Bavanat County, Fars province, Iran. At the 2006 census, its population was 46, in 10 families.
