= Sabonah =

Sabonah سبنه
- Village
- Location within Iran
- Coordinates: 30°04′00″N 53°50′56″E
- Country: Iran
- Province: Fars
- County: Bavanat
- Bakhsh: Sarchehan
- Rural District: Sarchehan

Population (2006)
  - Total: 19
- Time zone: UTC+3:30 (IRST)
  - Summer (DST): UTC+4:30 (IRDT)

Sabonah (Persian: سبنه; also known as Seh Bonah) is a village in Sarchehan Rural District, Sarchehan District, Bavanat County, Fars province, Iran. At the 2006 census, its population was 19, in 5 families.
