= Deh-e Ziarat =

Deh-e Ziarat ده زيارت
- Village
- Location within Iran
- Coordinates: 29°55′17″N 53°53′25″E
- Country: Iran
- Province: Fars
- County: Bavanat
- Bakhsh: Sarchehan
- Rural District: Tujerdi

Population (2006)
  - Total: 594
- Time zone: UTC+3:30 (IRST)
  - Summer (DST): UTC+4:30 (IRDT)

Deh-e Ziarat (Persian: ده زيارت, also Romanized as Deh-e Zīārat, Deh-e Zeyārt, and Deh Zīārat) is a village in Tujerdi Rural District, Sarchehan District, Bavanat County, Fars province, Iran. At the 2006 census, its population was 594, in 125 families.
