= Tujerdi =

City in Fars province, Iran

Tujerdi Persian: توجردي
- City
- Location within Iran
- Coordinates: 29°55′34″N 53°58′17″E
- Country: Iran
- Province: Fars
- County: Sarchehan
- District: Tujerdi

Population (2016)
  - Total: 2,021
- Time zone: UTC+3:30 (IRST)

The city of Tujerdi (Persian: توجردي) (Note: Also romanized as Tūjerdī; also known as Tūcherdī) is the capital of Tujerdi District of Sarchehan County, Fars province, Iran. It also serves as the administrative center for Tujerdi Rural District.

== Demographics ==
=== Population ===
At the time of the 2006 National Census, Tujerdi's population was 1,515 in 387 households, when it was a village in Tujerdi Rural District of the former Sarchehan District of Bavanat County. The following census in 2011 counted 2,357 people in 621 households. The 2016 census measured the population of the village as 2,021 people in 631 households. It was the most populous village in its rural district.

After the census, the district was separated from the county in the establishment of Sarchehan County, and the rural district was transferred to the new Central District. After formation of the county, the rural district was separated from the district in the formation of Tujerdi District, and Tujerdi was elevated to the status of a city.
