= Tizabad =

Tizabad (Persian: تيزاباد) may refer to:

- Tizabad, Fars
- Tizabad, Kurdistan
