= Sarchehan =

Sarchehan (Persian: سرچهان) may refer to:

- Sarchehan District
- Sarchehan Rural District
