= Nuyeh =

Village in Iran

Nuyeh (Persian: نويه, also Romanized as Nūyeh; also known as Noveyeh and Nowbeh) is a village in Tujerdi Rural District, Sarchehan District, Bavanat County, Fars province, Iran. At the 2006 census, its population was 657, in 153 families.
