= Do Estakhr =

Do Estakhr دواستخر
- Village
- Location within Iran
- Coordinates: 30°15′53″N 53°24′08″E
- Country: Iran
- Province: Fars
- County: Bavanat
- Bakhsh: Sarchehan
- Rural District: Bagh Safa

Population (2006)
  - Total: 26
- Time zone: UTC+3:30 (IRST)
  - Summer (DST): UTC+4:30 (IRDT)

Do Estakhr (Persian: دواستخر; also known as Do Sakhlī and Do Salkhī) is a village in Bagh Safa Rural District, Sarchehan District, Bavanat County, Fars province, Iran. At the 2006 census, its population was 26, in 6 families.
