= Abu Tarbeh =

Abu Tarbeh ابوتربه
- Village
- Location within Iran
- Coordinates: 30°19′26″N 53°31′18″E
- Country: Iran
- Province: Fars
- County: Bavanat
- Bakhsh: Sarchehan
- Rural District: Bagh Safa

Population (2006)
  - Total: 471
- Time zone: UTC+3:30 (IRST)
  - Summer (DST): UTC+4:30 (IRDT)

Abu Tarbeh (Persian: ابوتربه, also Romanized as Abū Tarbeh; also known as Abū Taryeh and Bātarbeh) is a village in Bagh Safa Rural District, Sarchehan District, Bavanat County, Fars province, Iran. At the 2006 census, its population was 471, in 103 families.
