= Qaleh Beyg =

Qaleh Beyg قلعه بيگ
- Village
- Location within Iran
- Coordinates: 30°16′20″N 53°29′09″E
- Country: Iran
- Province: Fars
- County: Bavanat
- Bakhsh: Sarchehan
- Rural District: Bagh Safa

Population (2006)
  - Total: 85
- Time zone: UTC+3:30 (IRST)
  - Summer (DST): UTC+4:30 (IRDT)

Qaleh Beyg (Persian: قلعه بيگ, also Romanized as Qal‘eh Beyg; also known as Qal‘eh Beyk) is a village in Bagh Safa Rural District, Sarchehan District, Bavanat County, Fars province, Iran. At the 2006 census, its population was 85, in 19 families.
