= Saghuyeh =

Saghuyeh ساغويه
- Village
- Location within Iran
- Coordinates: 29°53′12″N 53°58′00″E
- Country: Iran
- Province: Fars
- County: Bavanat
- Bakhsh: Sarchehan
- Rural District: Tujerdi

Population (2006)
  - Total: 234
- Time zone: UTC+3:30 (IRST)
  - Summer (DST): UTC+4:30 (IRDT)

Saghuyeh (Persian: ساغويه, also Romanized as Sāghūyeh; also known as Sāqū’īyeh and Sātū’īyeh) is a village in Tujerdi Rural District, Sarchehan District, Bavanat County, Fars province, Iran. At the 2006 census, its population was 234, in 49 families.
