= Kuluyeh =

Kuluyeh كولوئيه
- Village
- Location within Iran
- Coordinates: 30°08′38″N 53°33′27″E
- Country: Iran
- Province: Fars
- County: Bavanat
- Bakhsh: Sarchehan
- Rural District: Bagh Safa

Population (2006)
  - Total: 40
- Time zone: UTC+3:30 (IRST)
  - Summer (DST): UTC+4:30 (IRDT)

Kuluyeh (Persian: كولوئيه, also Romanized as Kūlūyeh) is a village in Bagh Safa Rural District, Sarchehan District, Bavanat County, Fars province, Iran. At the 2006 census, its population was 40, in 13 families.
