= Band-e Now, Fars =

Band-e Now بندنو
- Village
- Location within Iran
- Coordinates: 29°54′45″N 54°00′26″E
- Country: Iran
- Province: Fars
- County: Bavanat
- Bakhsh: Sarchehan
- Rural District: Tujerdi

Population (2006)
  - Total: 252
- Time zone: UTC+3:30 (IRST)
  - Summer (DST): UTC+4:30 (IRDT)

Band-e Now (Persian: بندنو) is a village in Tujerdi Rural District, Sarchehan District, Bavanat County, Fars province, Iran. At the 2006 census, its population was 252, in 69 families.
