= Ahla Kuh =

Ahla Kuh اهل كوه
- Village
- Location within Iran
- Coordinates: 30°05′07″N 53°51′05″E
- Country: Iran
- Province: Fars
- County: Bavanat
- Bakhsh: Sarchehan
- Rural District: Sarchehan

Population (2006)
  - Total: 95
- Time zone: UTC+3:30 (IRST)
  - Summer (DST): UTC+4:30 (IRDT)

Ahla Kuh (Persian: اهل كوه, also Romanized as Āhla Kūh; also known as A‘lā Kūh) is a village in Sarchehan Rural District, Sarchehan District, Bavanat County, Fars province, Iran. At the 2006 census, its population was 95, in 26 families.
