= Qanat Sorkh =

Qanat Sorkh (Persian: قنات سرخ) may refer to:

- Qanat Sorkh, Fars
- Qanat Sorkh, Kerman
