= Bagh Safa =

City in Fars province, Iran

Bagh Safa Persian: باغ صفا
- City
- Location within Iran
- Coordinates: 30°14′44″N 53°30′40″E
- Country: Iran
- Province: Fars
- County: Sarchehan
- District: Bagh Safa

Population (2016)
  - Total: 908
- Time zone: UTC+3:30 (IRST)

Bagh Safa (Persian: باغ صفا) (Note: Also romanized as Bāgh Şafā; also known as Bāgh Seyāh, Bāgh-e Seyāh, and Bāgh-e Sīāh) is a city in, and the capital of, Bagh Safa District of Sarchehan County, Fars province, Iran. It also serves as the administrative center for Bagh Safa Rural District.

== Demographics ==
=== Population ===
At the time of the 2006 National Census, Bagh Safa's population was 864 in 211 households, when it was a village in Bagh Safa Rural District of the former Sarchehan District of Bavanat County. The following census in 2011 counted 964 people in 280 households. The 2016 census measured the population of the village as 908 people in 276 households.

After the census, the district was separated from the county in the establishment of Sarchehan County, and the rural district was transferred to the new Bagh Safa District. Bagh Safa was elevated to the status of a city.
