= Hesami =

City in Fars province, Iran

Hesami Persian: حسامي
- City
- Location within Iran
- Coordinates: 29°58′02″N 53°52′21″E
- Country: Iran
- Province: Fars
- County: Sarchehan
- District: Central

Population (2016)
  - Total: 3,131
- Time zone: UTC+3:30 (IRST)
- Website: www.hesami.com/names/

Hesami (Persian: حسامي) (Note: Also romanized as Ḩesāmī) is a city in, and the capital of, the Central District of Sarchehan County, Fars province, Iran. The previous capital of the district was the city of Korehi.

== Demographics ==
=== Population ===
At the time of the 2006 National Census, Hesami's population was 2,348 in 569 households, when it was a village in Sarchehan Rural District of the former Sarchehan District of Bavanat County. The following census in 2011 counted 2,826 people in 771 households, by which time the village had been elevated to the status of a city. The 2016 census measured the population of the city as 3,131 people in 1,000 households.

After the census, the district was separated from the county in the establishment of Sarchehan County, and Hesami was transferred to the new Central District.
