= Ibrahim al-Musawi al-Zanjani =

Iranian faqih and writer

- إبراهيم الموسوي الزنجاني
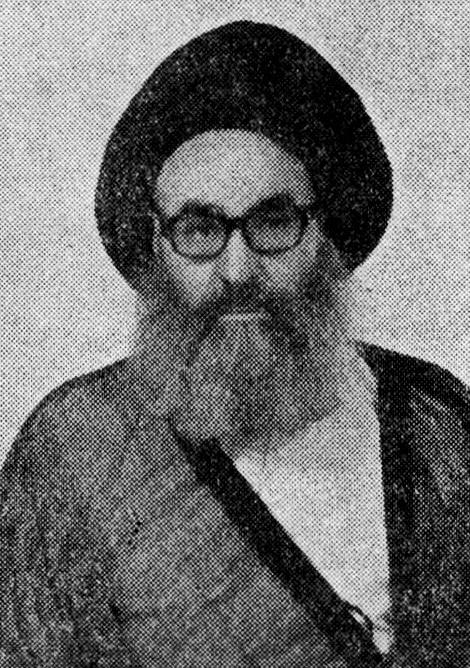
- Al-Zanjani in Najaf, 1970s
- Born: 1925; Sain Qaleh, Abhar, Imperial State of Iran
- Died: November 13, 1999 (aged 74)
- Occupations: Islamic jurist; writer; teacher
- Writing career
- Language: Arabic, Azerbaijani and Persian
- Genre: Religious literature

Sayyid Ibrahim al-Musawi al-Zanjani (Arabic: إبراهيم الموسوي الزنجاني, romanized: Ibrāhīm al-Mūsawī al-Zanjānī; 1925 – 13 November 1999) was an Iranian Ja'fari jurist and writer, best known for his works on various Islamic topics via Twelver Shia outlook, which most of them were published in the successive years of the late 1970s and early 1980s. Born in Sain Qaleh village, then part of Abhar to a well-known Musawi family. After studying in Qom, he went to Najaf and stayed there for about 31 years. He also lived in Kuwait and Syria for many years, fulfilling his Sharia and educational duties. He died at the age of 74 and buried next to the grave of his father in Radekan, Qazvin.

== Origins ==
Ibrahim al-Zanjani traces his paternal lineage to the Musawites, an umbrella term for the all descendants of Musa al-Kazim. He himself mentioned his nasab (lineage) as follows: Ibrahim bin Sajideen (d. 1952) bin Baqir (d. 1943) bin Ibrahim bin Bahramali bin Yadullah bin Murad Ali bin Amin bin Muhammad bin Ali Akbar bin Muhammad bin Abdullah bin Qasim bin Taj Al-Din bin Ali bin Muhammad bin Ahmad bin Hussein bin Ali bin Muhammad bin Hassan bin Musa bin Abdullah bin Muhammad bin Ahmed bin Mahmoud bin Ahmed bin Hussein bin Abdullah bin Muhammad al-Abid bin Musa bin Jaafar bin Muhammad bin Ali bin Hussein bin Ali bin Abu Talib bin Abd al-Muttalib. He also has mentioned the exact date of death and burial place of some of his paternal ancestors: his father Sajidin died on 21 Dhu al-Qaida 1379/ 16 May 1960, buried next to the grave of Imamzadeh Abu Saeed in Radekan, Qazvin; his grandfather Baqir, who died in 1362 AH/ 1943 and was buried next to the grave of Imamzadeh Yahya bin Musa al-Kazim in Sain Qaleh; and his great grandfather Ibrahim, who died in 1322 AH/1905, is also buried there. They were known as "Ahmadi" sayyids. His father had four sons and two daughters, among his sons: Ibrahim, Ismail, Muhammad and Morteza.

== Biography ==
Ibrahim Al-Zanjani was born in the year 1344 AH / 1925 in the village of Sain Qaleh, then part of Abhar, Zanjan and grew up there. He learned his introductions and Persian language with his father, then migrated to Qom in 1941 and studied under Ahmad Khonsari and Musa Zanjani. In January 1946 he moved to Kingdom of Iraq to continue his religious education in Najaf and attended classes of Muhsin al-Hakim, Hussein al-Hamamy, Abu al-Qasim al-Khoei, Abdullah al-Shirazi, Hussein al-Hilli, Baqir al-Zanjani, and Abd al-A'la al-Sabziwari etc until he graduated and gained ijazah.

He was appointed as imam of the Alawite Mosque and worked as religious teacher in Najaf. Renowned as a researcher of Islamic history and ethics. He stayed in Najaf for 31 years and taught about five hundred students, also conducted charitable projects in Zanjan, Istanbul, Kirkuk and Bahrain. In 1975, Al-Zanjani deported from Ba'athist Iraq, he moved to Kuwait, then to Damascus and resided in Syria, fulfilling his Sharia duties.

Al-Zanjani died on 13 November 1999/5 Sha'ban 1420 AH at the age of 74, and was buried in one of the villages of Takestan County, next to his father's grave.

== Personal life ==
Al-Zanjani traveled a lot. Except for Syria and Iraq, he traveled to Mecca 15 times, Cairo 5 times, Istanbul twice, India, Jordan, Lebanon, the Emirates, Qatar, Oman, Bahrain and Kuwait, and traveled to London for a medical treatment. Until 1979 had five sons: Kazem, Ahmad, Muhammad Baqir, Muhammad Musa, Muhammad Hussein, and seven daughters: Masoumeh, Zahra, Tahereh, Jalileh, Fatemeh known as Mahin, Ma'edeh and Soheileh. He also married to Ghaddah Ismail al-Fakhouri, a Lebanese from Tire. One of their sons, Ali, who was born on 26 August 1987 in Damascus, joined the Hezbollah belligerents in the Syrian civil war as Syrian Arab Republic allies. He was killed in Saraqib on 29 January 2020 at the age of 31 during the 2019–2020 northwestern Syria offensive.

== Works ==
Some biographers and bibliographers have confused him with a namesake Ibrahim Zanjai (1855–1935) a nonauthor. Ibrahim Al-Zanjani wrote numerous books in Arabic and Persian on various Islamic topics, such as: theology, jurisprudence and it's principles, philosophy, scholastic theology, ethics, genealogy, biographies and religious history. Among his published books are:

- Persian: تاریخ زنجان: علماء و دانشمندان, lit. 'Tārīkh-i Zanjān : ʻulamā' va dānishmandān', 1972
- Arabic: وسيلة الدارين في أنصار الحسين, romanized: Wasīlat al-dārayn fī anṣār al-Ḥusayn, 1975
- Arabic: بداية الفلسفة الإسلامية, romanized: Bidāyat al-falsafah al-Islāmīyah, 1977
- Arabic: مختصر فقه الإمامية الإثنى عشرية, romanized: Mukhtaṣir fiqh al-Imāmīyah al-Ithnay ʻAsharīyah, 1979
- Arabic: كشكول, romanized: Kashkūl, 1979
- Arabic: بداية أصول الفقه, romanized: Bidāyat uṣūl al-fiqh, 1979
- Arabic: كشف المراد في شرح تجريد الاعتقاد, romanized: Kašf al-murād fī šarḥ taǧrīd al-iʿtiqād, 1979
- Arabic: فلسفة الأخلاق الإسلامية, romanized: Falsafat al-akhlāq al-Islāmīyah, 1982
- Arabic: عقائد الإمامية الإثنا عشرية, romanized: ʻAqāyid al-Imāmīyah al-Ithnay ʻAsharaīyah, three volumes, 1982
- Arabic: جولة في الأماكن المقدسة, romanized: Jawlah fī al-amākin al-muqaddasah, 1985
- Arabic: نهاية الفلسفة الإسلامية, romanized: Nihāyat al-falsafah al-Islāmīyah, 1987
