= Dasht-e Rais =

Dasht-e Rais دشت رئيس
- Village
- Location within Iran
- Coordinates: 30°00′34″N 53°46′56″E
- Country: Iran
- Province: Fars
- County: Bavanat
- Bakhsh: Sarchehan
- Rural District: Sarchehan

Population (2006)
  - Total: 158
- Time zone: UTC+3:30 (IRST)
  - Summer (DST): UTC+4:30 (IRDT)

Dasht-e Rais (Persian: دشت رئيس, also Romanized as Dasht-e Ra’īs; also known as Hāshem Khān, Qal‘eh Hāshim Khān, and Qal‘eh-ye Hāshem Khān) is a village in Sarchehan Rural District, Sarchehan District, Bavanat County, Fars province, Iran. At the 2006 census, its population was 158, in 47 families.
