= Hesami Rural District =

Rural district in Fars province, Iran

Hesami Rural District Persian: دهستان حسامی
- Rural District
- Location within Iran
- Coordinates: 30°01′11″N 53°49′57″E
- Country: Iran
- Province: Fars
- County: Sarchehan
- District: Central
- Capital: Jamalabad
- Time zone: UTC+3:30 (IRST)

Hesami Rural District (Persian: دهستان حسامی) is in the Central District of Sarchehan County, Fars province, Iran. Its capital is the village of Jamalabad, whose population at the time of the 2016 National Census was 724 in 221 households.

== History ==
After the 2016 census, Sarchehan District was separated from Bavanat County in the establishment of Sarchehan County. Hesami Rural District was created in the Central District after formation of the county.
