= Hashem Khan =

Hashem Khan may refer to:

- Dasht-e Rais, also known as Hāshem Khān, a village in Sarchehan Rural District, Iran
- Hashem Khan (artist) (born 1941), Bangladeshi painter
