= Kalateh-ye Qasemabad =

Kalateh-ye Qasemabad (Persian: کلاته قاسم آباد) may refer to:

- Kalateh-ye Qasemabad, South Khorasan
- Kalateh-ye Qasemabad, Razavi Khorasan

== See also ==
- Qasemabad (disambiguation)
