= Qanat Sorkh, Fars =

Qanat Sorkh قنات سرخ
- Village
- Location within Iran
- Coordinates: 30°05′07″N 53°35′57″E
- Country: Iran
- Province: Fars
- County: Bavanat
- Bakhsh: Sarchehan
- Rural District: Sarchehan

Population (2006)
  - Total: 165
- Time zone: UTC+3:30 (IRST)
  - Summer (DST): UTC+4:30 (IRDT)

Qanat Sorkh (Persian: قنات سرخ, also Romanized as Qanāt Sorkh) is a village in Sarchehan Rural District, Sarchehan District, Bavanat County, Fars province, Iran. At the 2006 census, its population was 165, in 38 families.
