= Qasemabad, Qazvin =

Qasemabad (Persian: قاسم اباد) in Qazvin Province may refer to:

- Qasemabad, alternate name of Jannatabad, Qazvin
- Qasemabad, Takestan, in the Central District of Takestan County
- Qasemabad, Khorramdasht, in Khorramdasht District, Takestan County
