= Tizabad, Fars =

Tizabad تيزاباد
- Village
- Location within Iran
- Coordinates: 29°55′34″N 54°05′23″E
- Country: Iran
- Province: Fars
- County: Bavanat
- Bakhsh: Sarchehan
- Rural District: Tujerdi

Population (2006)
  - Total: 21
- Time zone: UTC+3:30 (IRST)
  - Summer (DST): UTC+4:30 (IRDT)

Tizabad (Persian: تيزاباد, also Romanized as Tīzābād) is a village in Tujerdi Rural District, Sarchehan District, Bavanat County, Fars province, Iran. At the 2006 census, its population was 21, in 6 families.
