= Qasimiyeh =

Qasimiyeh or Qasimiye may refer to:

- Qasimiyeh, a village in Iran
- Qasimiye, a wadi in Lebanon

== See also ==
- Qasimiya
