= Radekan =

Radekan or Radkan (Persian: رادكان) may refer to:

- Radkan, Golestan
- Radekan, Qazvin
- Radkan, Razavi Khorasan
- Radkan Rural District, in Razavi Khorasan Province
