= Qasemabad, Tujerdi =

Qasemabad قاسم اباد
- Village
- Location within Iran
- Coordinates: 29°52′24″N 53°58′36″E
- Country: Iran
- Province: Fars
- County: Bavanat
- Bakhsh: Sarchehan
- Rural District: Tujerdi

Population (2006)
  - Total: 460
- Time zone: UTC+3:30 (IRST)
  - Summer (DST): UTC+4:30 (IRDT)

Qasemabad (Persian: قاسم اباد, also Romanized as Qāsemābād; also known as Qāsemābād-e Sāqū’īyeh and Qāsemābād Sāqū’īyeh) is a village in Tujerdi Rural District, Sarchehan District, Bavanat County, Fars province, Iran. At the 2006 census, its population was 460, in 109 families.
