= Ali Khan Vali =

Iranian photographer (1845–1901)

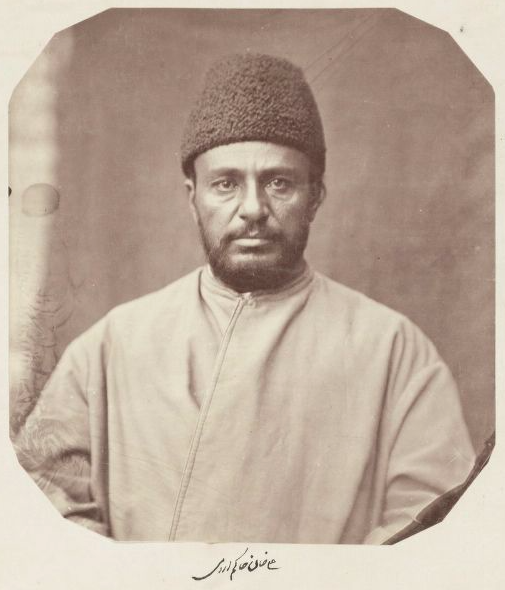
- Born: 1262 Hijri (c. 1845 CE); Tehran, Iran
- Died: 1318 Hijri (c. 1901 CE); Tehran, Iran
- Occupations: Photographer, governor
- Children: Gassem Khan, Heydar Goli Khan
- Parent: Mohammad Gasem Khan Vali

Ali Khan Vali (Persian: علی خان والی, 1262 – 1318 Hijri; c. 1845 CE – c. 1901 CE) was an Iranian photographer and political figure of the era of Naser al-Din Shah and Mozaffar ad-Din Shah Qajar.

== Biography ==
=== Early life ===
Ali Khan, son of Mohammad Gasem Khan Vali, son of Dust-Ali Khan Mo'ayyerolmamalek, was born in Tehran on 1262 Hijri. After returning from the post of consulate general of Tbilisi, Mohammad Gasem went to Saint Petersburg with grand ambassador Abbas Goli Khan Nuri as an embassy advisor to congratulate the coronation of Alexander III, Tsar of Russia and after returning, he was appointed first as minister resident and then minister plenipotentiary in Saint Petersburg. During youth, Ali Khan was living in Russia with his father and started studying French language, history, geography and geometry there and learned the new art of photography along with it. After returning, Mohammad Gasem was appointed as the governor of Gilan and performed valuable services there, including checking law enforcement of the cities, building the Iraq road and checking the stations along the roads. Mohammad Gasem became known as Vali for frequent governances until it became their surnames.

=== Reign of Maragheh ===
In 1285 Hijri, Gasem Khan Vali was dismissed from ruling Gilan and Ali Khan Vali was appointed as special servant of the royal court and achieved the chance to go to Atabat-e Aliat (Karbala) along with Naser al-Din Shah the next year. In 1288 when Gasem Khan Vali was appointed by Zell-e Soltan to serve in the government of Fars, Ali Khan did not accompany Gasem and stayed in Tehran. After Gasem's death (1289), Saheb Divan was removed from governor of Azerbaijan in 1296 and Ali Khan was assigned to Azerbaijan along with a group with the crown prince and was appointed as governor of Maragheh. Ali Khan began photography en route to Maragheh and added pictures of the city hall and authorities of Maragheh to the first pages of his album. During Ali Khan's reign in Maragheh, the city was cleansed from thieves and security was established. At the beginning of Ali Khan's reign, some powerful figures hired some scoundrels in disguise of servants and sent them to the houses of the people for theft, and the victims did not dare to complain and sue their lost properties due to fearing the recruiters of the thieves. Ali Khan tried to fight those actions since the start of his reign and in order to do that, he personally lurked in alleys with some of his agents during cold nights of winter until he eradicated theft and arrested and imprisoned the thieves. Only months had passed since his takeover in Maragheh before the crisis of Sheikh Ubeydullah Nahri occurred. After ending the crisis and twenty months of reign in Maragheh, Ali Khan went to Tabriz and formally resigned from governor of Maragheh there and stayed in Tabriz for a while. During the time, Hasan Ali Khan Garroosy intended to suppress the scoundrels of the borderlands and in order to prevent an evil event in his absence in the lands of Azerbaijan, he formed a parliament titled Public Majlis of Azerbaijan from authorities and governors of the lands and assigned Ali Khan to supervise the mentioned parliament.

=== Reign of Urmia and Khoy ===
In Shawwal the same year Hijri, due to the illness of Sani'ol-Doleh, the governor of Urmia, Ali Khan was appointed for the post and remained as governor of Urmia until the end of Jumada al-awwal 1300. Then, on the order of the crown prince's agents, Salar Lashkar was removed from governor of Khoy and Ali Khan Vali was appointed as governor of Khoy and Salmas. In there, he had several architectural actions like paving streets, renovating the city hall, and reconstructing the Grand Bazaar of the city recorded in his government legacy. In there, he sent visualized reports of his jurisdiction to the Shah and achieved a handwriting of the Shah due to those efforts.

In 1302, he appointed Jamshid Khan Makuyi as lieutenant governor of Khoy and went to Urmia himself. Then he went to Tehran and brought Gasem, his 15-year-old son, with him back to Khoy for training and established a special school in the government mansion for his education. But after a short while, he was removed from governor of Khoy due to some provocations and Amidoddoleh replaced him as governor. In Jumada al-Thani 1303, Ali Khan departed for Tabriz and stayed in that city for six and a half months went to Sain Qaleh in order to discipline Soleyman Khan's children in Dhu al-Hijjah the same year and produced some photos of Takht-e Soleymān in that region.

In Rabi' al-awwal the same year, the royalty reappointed him as governor of Urmia due to some disturbances in Urmian region and Ali Khan soon suppressed the riot in the new post. In those disturbances, Hasu, who had taken Fort Jarmi with his troops, was suppressed by Ali Khan and as a result, peace was once again established in Urmia. Due to that good work and his merit, Ali Khan officially achieved the title Jinab by an executive order. In the trip, he picked Ali Agha the Photographer as his pupil and determined to train him and added new photos to his album by the latter's help. Vali remained as governor of Urmia for two years and eight months.

=== Reign of Ardabil ===
In Naser al-Din Shah's return from his third trip to Europe, Ali Khan welcomed him and was appointed as governor of Ardabil by the Shah. in 1308 Hijri, Vali got in a slight controversy with some market men including tanners about his order to transfer workplace to outside the city. Those controversies caused the reputation that Ali Khan had in public view to be scratched.

At the end of 1315, after the exacerbation of Heydari-Ne'mati controversies in Ardabil and public riot against Nezamossaltaneh, the governor, the government decided to appoint Ali Khan ValI as governor of Ardabil once again. He did a full-scale effort in resolving disputes. With no accomplishment, he arrested Mirza Ali Akbar, one of Ne'mati headmasters, and exiled him to Maragheh. When Ali Akbar returned to Ardabil after one year, he provoked Khosro Khan Yurtchi against the governor for revenge. After gathering troops, Khosro Khan surrounded Ali Khan in Dasheskan garden and sent him to Tabriz with some people after arresting him. The crown prince considered that insult to the governor unacceptable and summoned Khosro Khan to Tabriz. But he disobeyed the order and was finally spared with a ten thousand-toman suit.

In the same year, Ali Khan became affected with a dangerous disease and left Ardabil for Tehran for treatment.

=== Death ===
After three years of illness, Ali Khan died in Tehran on 1318 Hijri.

== Personal life ==
Ali Khan had much interest in exercise. Dust-Ali Mo'ayyeri has described his interest this way:

Ali Khan Vali was skilled in exercises like Indian club, Kabbadeh, push-up and wrestling and practiced every morning and evening at his private gym and engaged with Pahlevans of his time and tested his powers. He ripped a carpet apart by his hands, turned copper collections to tubes by hands and stole half an unripe quince on a branch by his finger pressure.

== Ali Khan Palace ==
On the upstream of the village Ja'far Abad, Shemiran, Ali Khan founded a summer mansion and a large garden. During summer, he invited the ministers and important figures of his time to the garden and arranged large feasts. A while later, Ali Khan's son, Gassem Khan had another mansion built beside the mountain, which formed one side of the walls of the mansion. The garden and the mansions were titled Ali Khan Palace and were attached to the foundations of Sa'dabad Complex in Pahlavi era.

== See also ==
- Culture of Iran
- Islamic art
- Iranian art
- Iranian art and architecture
- List of Iranian artists
