= Tujerdi District =

District in Fars province, Iran

Tujerdi District Persian: بخش توجردی
- District
- Location within Iran
- Coordinates: 29°54′34″N 53°58′44″E
- Country: Iran
- Province: Fars
- County: Sarchehan
- Capital: Tujerdi
- Time zone: UTC+3:30 (IRST)

Tujerdi District (Persian: بخش توجردی) is in Sarchehan County, Fars province, Iran. Its capital is the city of Tujerdi, whose population at the time of the 2016 National Census was 2,021 people in 631 households.

== History ==
After the 2016 census, Sarchehan District was separated from Bavanat County in the establishment of Sarchehan County, which was divided into two districts of two rural districts each, with the city of Korehi as its capital.

After formation of the county, Tujerdi Rural District was separated from the Central District in the formation of Tujerdi District. The village of Tujerdi was elevated to the status of a city.

== Demographics ==
=== Administrative divisions ===
Tujerdi District
Administrative Divisions
Marvashkan RD
Tujerdi RD
Tujerdi (city) (Note: Became a city after county formation)
RD = Rural District
