= Seyfabad, Qazvin =

Village in Qazvin province, Iran

Seyfabad Persian: سيف اباد
- Village
- Location within Iran
- Coordinates: 35°57′36″N 49°31′44″E
- Country: Iran
- Province: Qazvin
- County: Takestan
- District: Khorramdasht
- Rural District: Ramand-e Shomali

Population (2016)
  - Total: 793
- Time zone: UTC+3:30 (IRST)

Seyfabad (Persian: سيف اباد) (Note: Also romanized as Seyfābād; also known as Sa‘īdābād and Saifābād) is a village in Ramand-e Shomali Rural District of Khorramdasht District in Takestan County, Qazvin province, Iran.

== Demographics ==
=== Population ===
At the time of the 2006 National Census, the village's population was 878 in 249 households. The following census in 2011 counted 965 people in 287 households. The 2016 census measured the population of the village as 793 people in 270 households.
