= Jahanabad, Takestan =

Village in Qazvin province, Iran

Jahanabad Persian: جهان اباد
- Village
- Location within Iran
- Coordinates: 35°53′35″N 49°35′59″E
- Country: Iran
- Province: Qazvin
- County: Takestan
- District: Khorramdasht
- Rural District: Ramand-e Shomali

Population (2016)
  - Total: 1,055
- Time zone: UTC+3:30 (IRST)

Jahanabad (Persian: جهان اباد) (Note: Also romanized as Jahānābād and Jehānābād; also known as Jahānābād-e Afshārīeh and Jahānābād-e Afshārīyeh) is a village in Ramand-e Shomali Rural District of Khorramdasht District in Takestan County, Qazvin province, Iran.

== Demographics ==
=== Population ===
At the time of the 2006 National Census, the village's population was 1,035 in 265 households. The following census in 2011 counted 1,026 people in 287 households. The 2016 census measured the population of the village as 1,055 people in 321 households.
