= Dakan, Iran =

Village in Qazvin province, Iran

Dakan Persian: داكان
- Village
- Location within Iran
- Coordinates: 35°59′13″N 49°35′02″E
- Country: Iran
- Province: Qazvin
- County: Takestan
- District: Khorramdasht
- Rural District: Ramand-e Shomali

Population (2016)
  - Total: 863
- Time zone: UTC+3:30 (IRST)

Dakan (Persian: داكان) (Note: Also romanized as Dākān; also known as Dādkān and Dukkān) is a village in Ramand-e Shomali Rural District of Khorramdasht District in Takestan County, Qazvin province, Iran.

== Demographics ==
=== Population ===
At the time of the 2006 National Census, the village's population was 985 in 274 households. The following census in 2011 counted 1,019 people in 289 households. The 2016 census measured the population of the village as 863 people in 263 households.
