= Qanbarabad, Qazvin =

Village in Qazvin province, Iran

Qanbarabad Persian: قنبراباد
- Village
- Location within Iran
- Coordinates: 35°54′03″N 49°38′13″E
- Country: Iran
- Province: Qazvin
- County: Takestan
- District: Khorramdasht
- Rural District: Ramand-e Shomali

Population (2016)
  - Total: 191
- Time zone: UTC+3:30 (IRST)

Qanbarabad (Persian: قنبراباد) (Note: Also romanized as Qanbarābād; also known as Qanbar Shāh) is a village in Ramand-e Shomali Rural District of Khorramdasht District in Takestan County, Qazvin province, Iran.

== Demographics ==
=== Population ===
At the time of the 2006 National Census, the village's population was 224 in 50 households. The following census in 2011 counted 194 people in 44 households. The 2016 census measured the population of the village as 191 people in 55 households.
