= Ramand-e Shomali Rural District =

Rural district in Qazvin province, Iran

Ramand-e Shomali Rural District Persian: دهستان رامند شمالي
- Rural District
- Location within Iran
- Coordinates: 35°56′N 49°33′E
- Country: Iran
- Province: Qazvin
- County: Takestan
- District: Khorramdasht
- Established: 1987
- Capital: Khorramdasht

Population (2016)
  - Total: 6,845
- Time zone: UTC+3:30 (IRST)

Ramand-e Shomali Rural District (Persian: دهستان رامند شمالي) is in Khorramdasht District of Takestan County, Qazvin province, Iran. It is administered from the city of Khorramdasht. (Note: Formerly the village of Nahavand)

== Demographics ==
=== Population ===
At the time of the 2006 National Census, the rural district's population was 6,944 in 1,838 households. The census in 2011 recorded 7,238 inhabitants in 2,117 households. The 2016 census measured the population of the rural district as 6,845 in 2,144 households. The most populous of its eight villages was Radekan, with 2,306 people.

=== Other villages in the rural district ===
- Dakan
- Jahanabad
- Qanbarabad
- Qasemabad
- Seyfabad
- Varsaj Dodangeh
