= Varsaj Dodangeh =

Village in Qazvin province, Iran

Varsaj Dodangeh Persian: ورسج دودانگه
- Village
- Location within Iran
- Coordinates: 35°56′36″N 49°29′39″E
- Country: Iran
- Province: Qazvin
- County: Takestan
- District: Khorramdasht
- Rural District: Ramand-e Shomali

Population (2016)
  - Total: 1,098
- Time zone: UTC+3:30 (IRST)

Varsaj Dodangeh (Persian: ورسج دودانگه) (Note: Also romanized as Varsaj Dudangeh and Varsaj Dūdāngeh; also known as Varasnaj, Varsaj, Varsanj, Varseh, and Varsenj) is a village in Ramand-e Shomali Rural District of Khorramdasht District in Takestan County, Qazvin province, Iran.

== Demographics ==
=== Population ===
At the time of the 2006 National Census, the village's population was 1,132 in 293 households. The following census in 2011 counted 1,216 people in 358 households. The 2016 census measured the population of the village as 1,098 people in 344 households.
