= Arzhang Rural District =

Rural district in Fars province, Iran

Arzhang Rural District Persian: دهستان ارژنگ
- Rural District
- Location within Iran
- Coordinates: 30°09′03″N 53°33′50″E
- Country: Iran
- Province: Fars
- County: Sarchehan
- District: Bagh Safa
- Capital: Qanat Ebrahim
- Time zone: UTC+3:30 (IRST)

Arzhang Rural District (Persian: دهستان ارژنگ) is in Bagh Safa District of Sarchehan County, Fars province, Iran. Its capital is the village of Qanat Ebrahim, whose population at the time of the 2016 National Census was 591 in 176 households.

== History ==
After the 2016 census, Sarchehan District was separated from Bavanat County in the establishment of Sarchehan County, and Arzhang Rural District was created in the new Bagh Safa District.
