= Ghassem Khan Vali, Sardar Homayoun =

Iranian general, Mayor of Tabriz (1878–1933)

Sardar Homayoun Ghassem Khan Vali
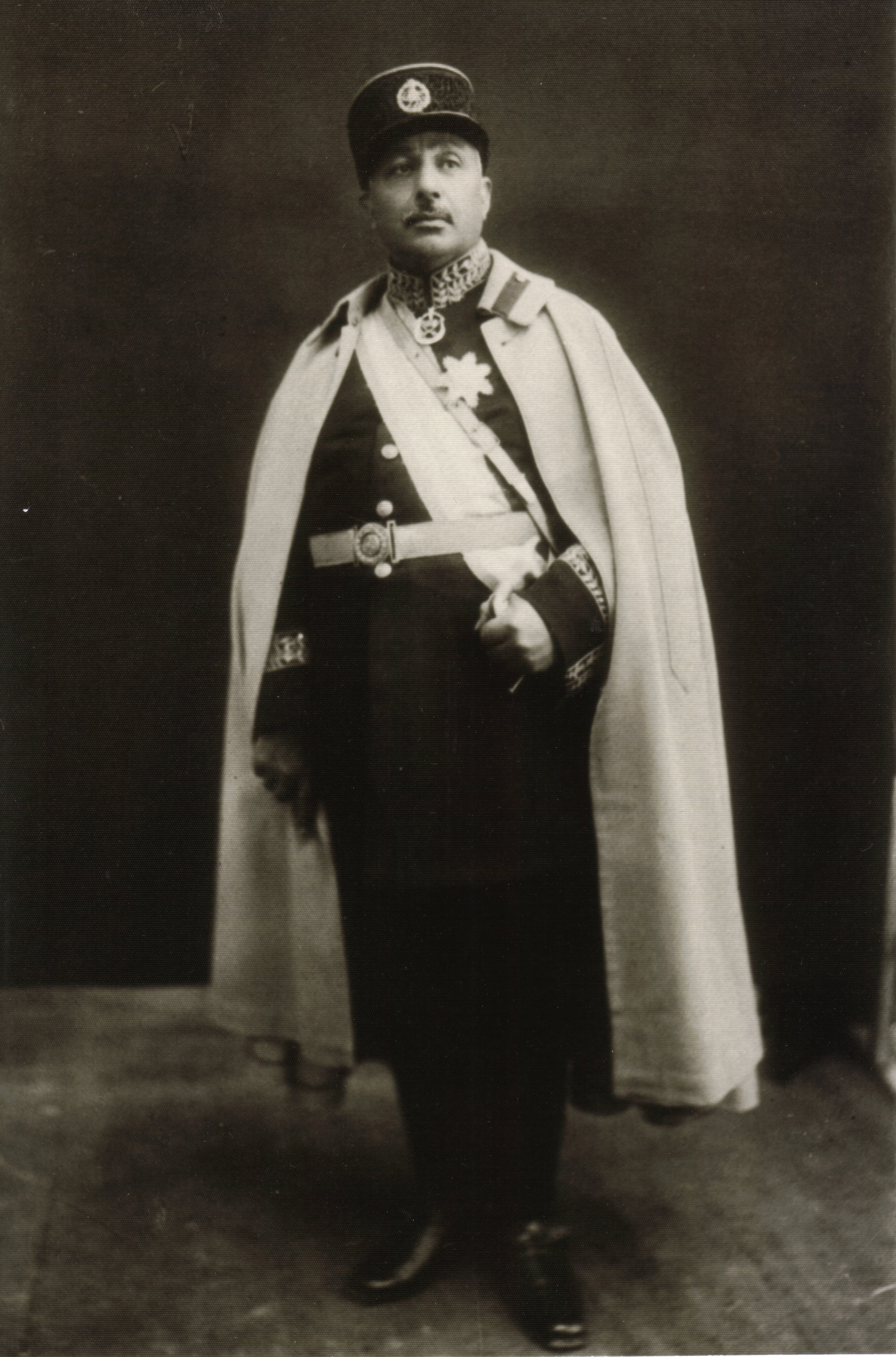
- Born: 1874; Tehran, Sublime State of Iran
- Died: 14 August 1933 (aged 58–59); Tabriz, Imperial State of Iran
- Occupations: General Army, Politician, First Mayor of Tabriz
- Father: Ali Khan Vali

Ghassem Khan Vali (Persian: قاسم خان والی; 1874 – 14 August 1933), also known by his military title of Sardar Homayoun (Persian: سردار همايون), the son of Ali Khan Vali and grandson of Mohamad Ghassem Khan Vali was the first Imperial Iranian Army general to graduate from the prestigious Saint-Cyr Military School in France, which was founded by Napoléon in 1802. He was the commander of the Persian Cossack Brigade from 1920 to 1921.

== Life ==
During the Overthrow of the Qajar dynasty, Sardar Homayoun was encouraged by the local politicians and moderates, backed by Edmund Ironside, 1st Baron Ironside and the British Government, to become the Shah of Iran (his ancestry as a member of the Qajar dynasty supported his claim to the throne). He declined out of his loyalty to Ahmad Shah, although it was stated that it was out of his fear for his family's safety and his moral reluctance to use force against his countrymen, a measure which was inevitable for the maintenance of the monarchy.

His reluctance was seen as cowardice by the British, who later gave their support to Reza Shah Pahlavi. During Reza Shah's reign, Vali was appointed commander of the Cossack Division in Northern Iran. He was the first Mayor of Tabriz in 1908, (see List of mayors of Tabriz), and as a modern man, he was at the origin of the first electrical generator to Tabriz. He also introduced the first metallic printing press in Iran. Sardar Homayoun also was one of the first modern economists in Iran. He soon withdrew to his family's estate to focus on writing and farming. An aristocrat by birth, he believed in the character conferred by military education and discipline.

== Family ==
His cousin, Doust Mohammad Khan Moayer ol-Mamalek, was the son-in-law of Naser al-Din Shah Qajar who married his daughter Princess Esmat os-Saltaneh. He had five daughters and two sons. His sons, Ebrahim and Ali Vali, also served in the Imperial Iranian Army as generals during the reign of Mohammad Reza Shah.

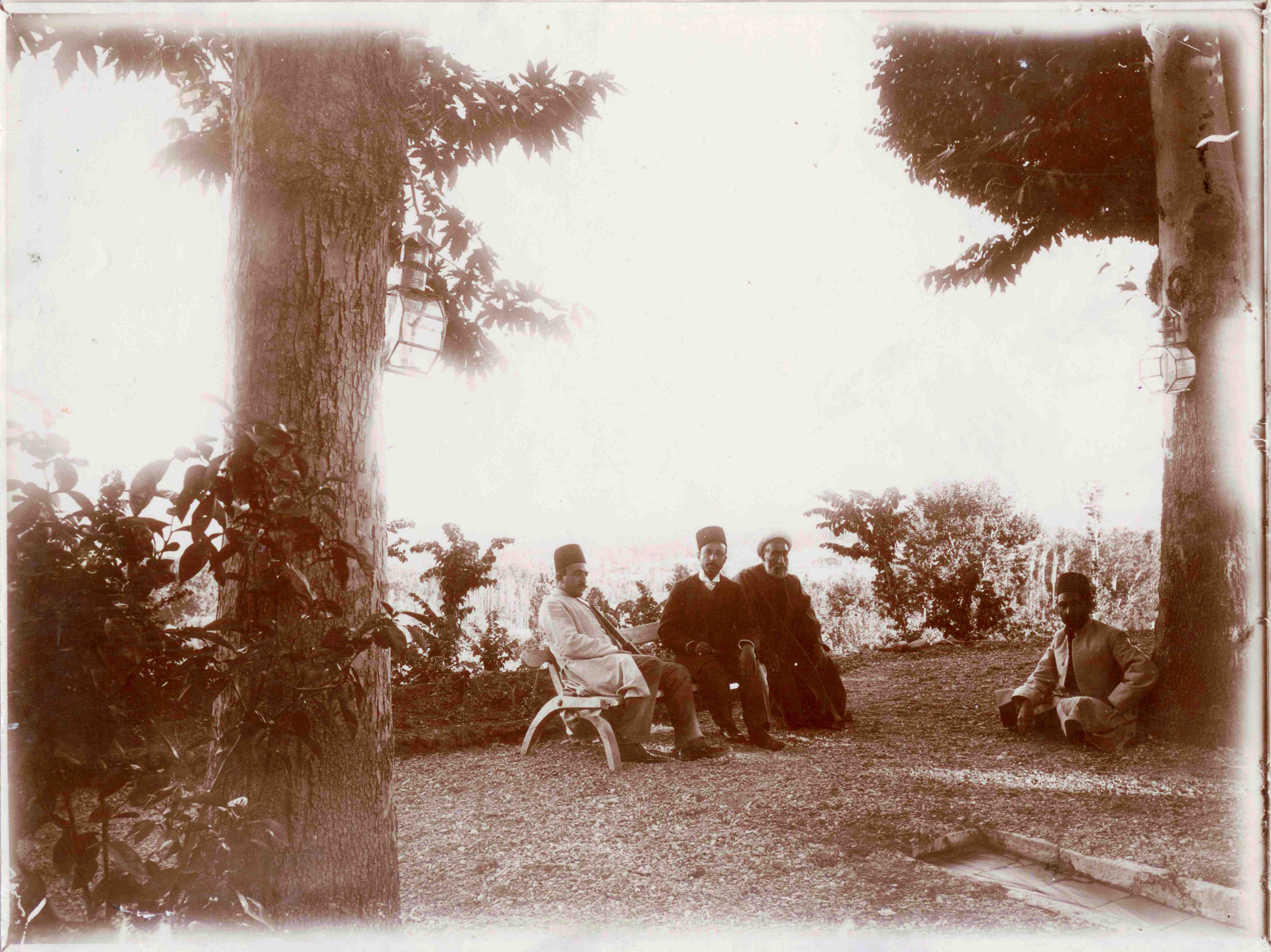
Sardar Homayoun at the Sa'dabad Complex

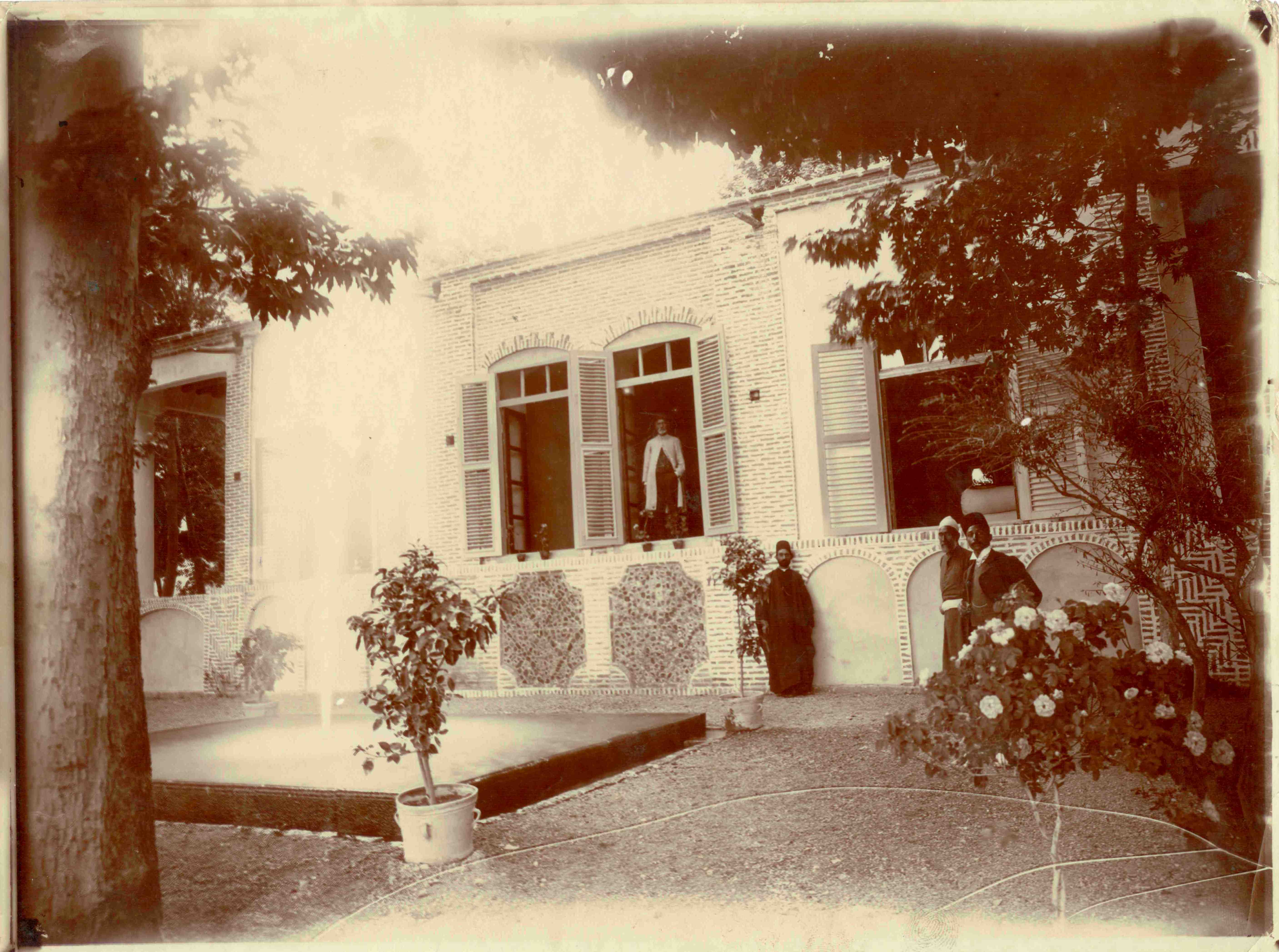
Sardar Homayoun at the Sa'dabad Complex

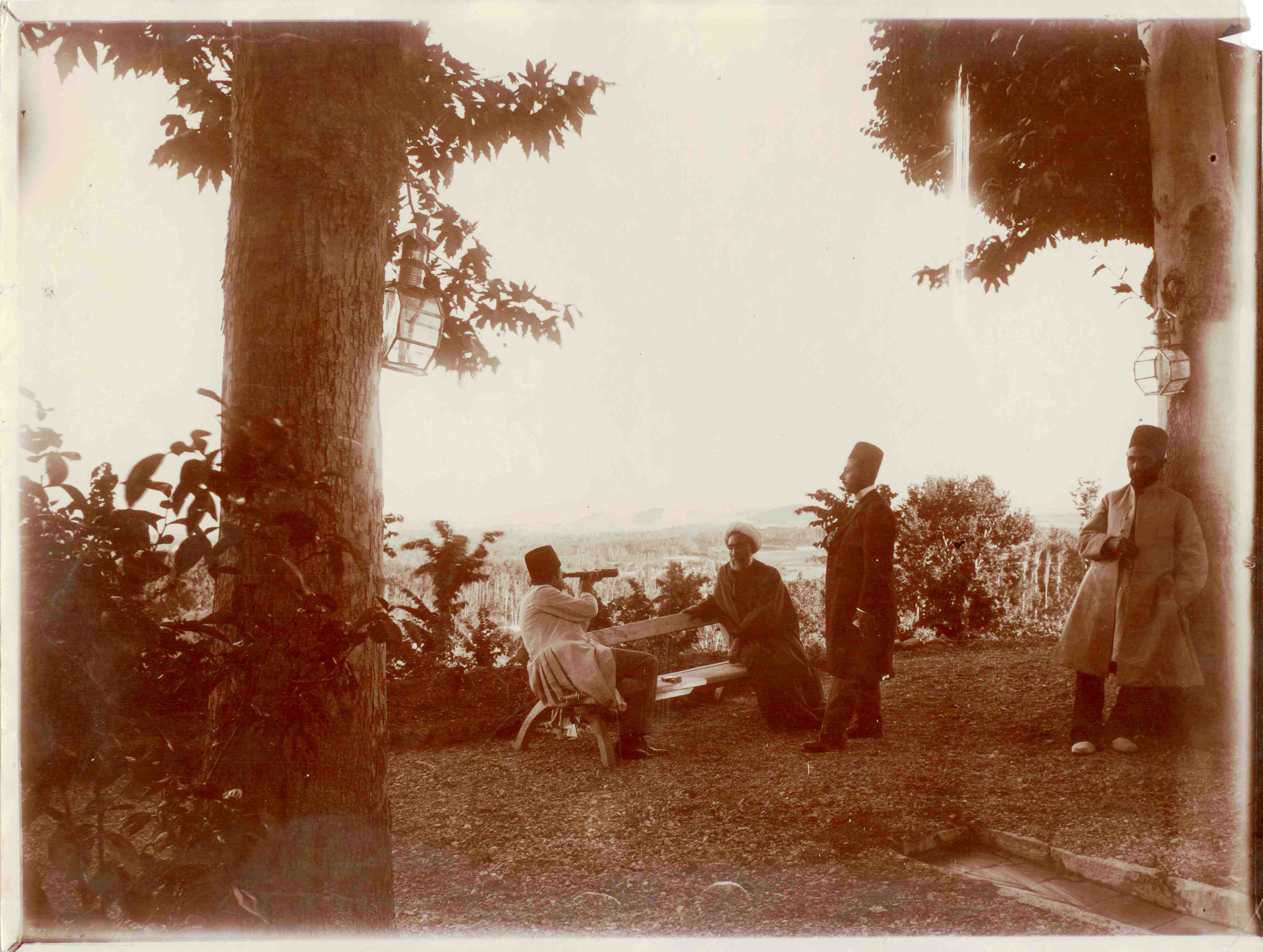
Sardar Homayoun at the Sa'dabad Complex

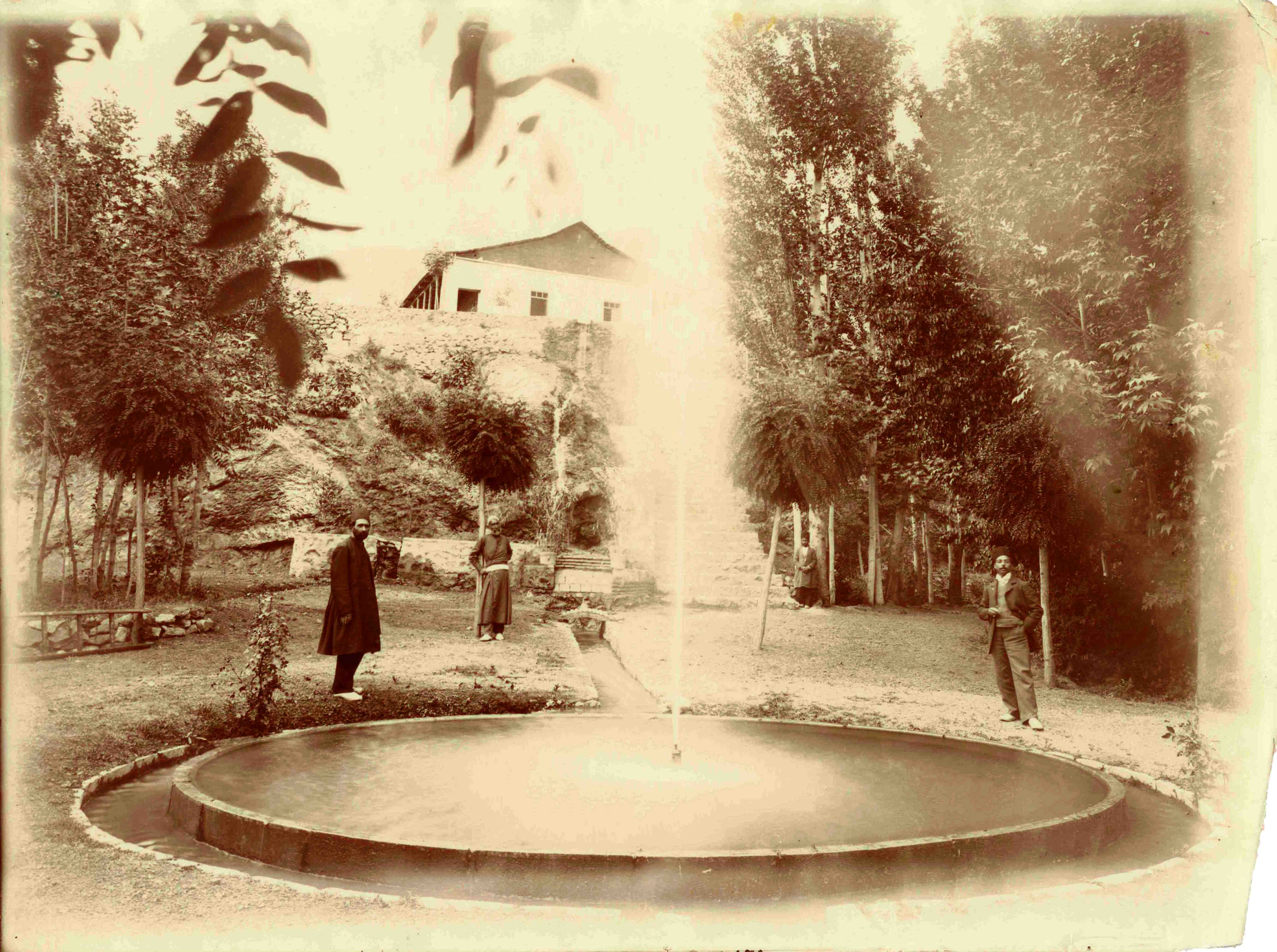
Sardar Homayoun at the Sa'dabad Complex

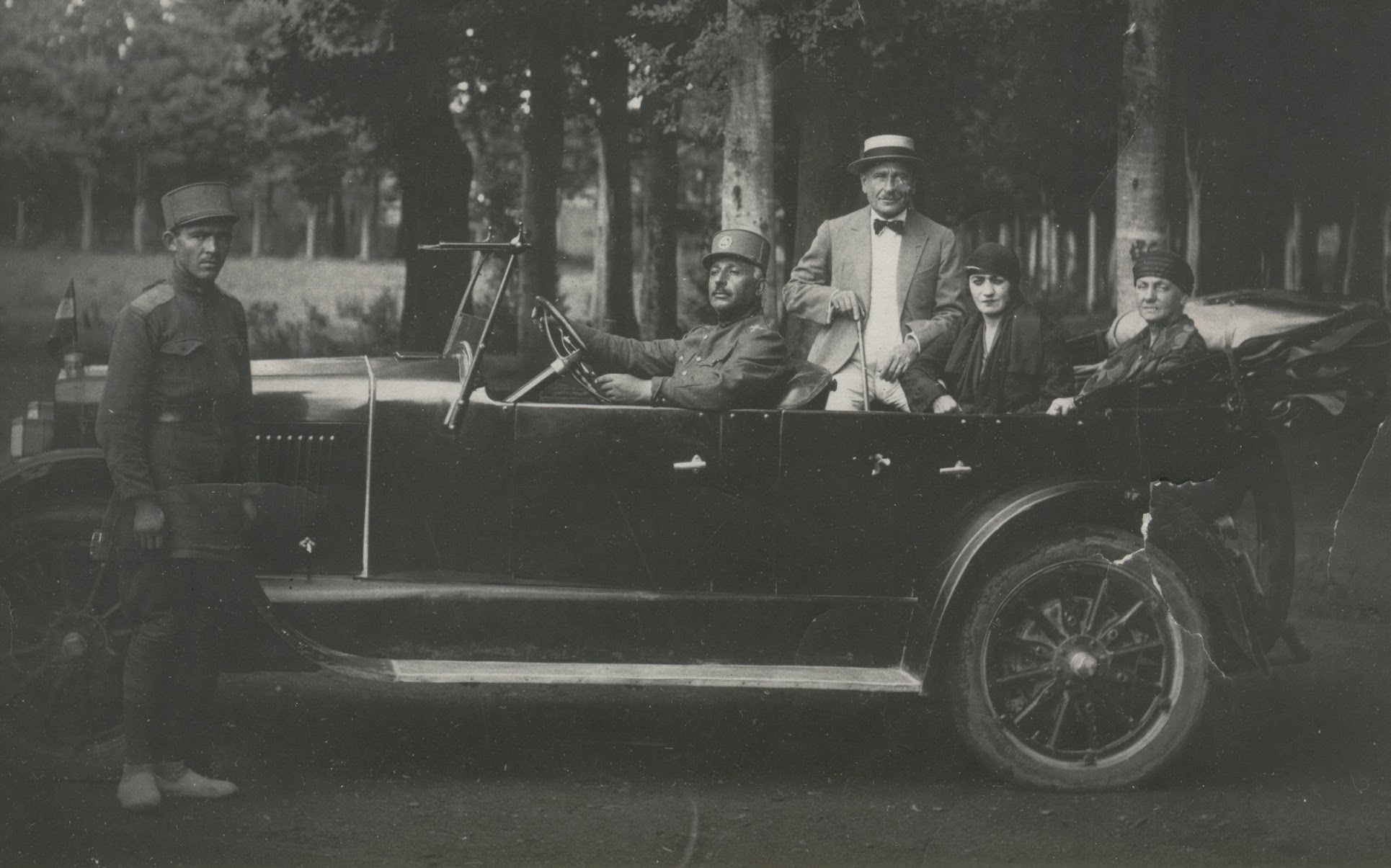
Sardar Homayoun at the steering wheel of a Rolls-Royce

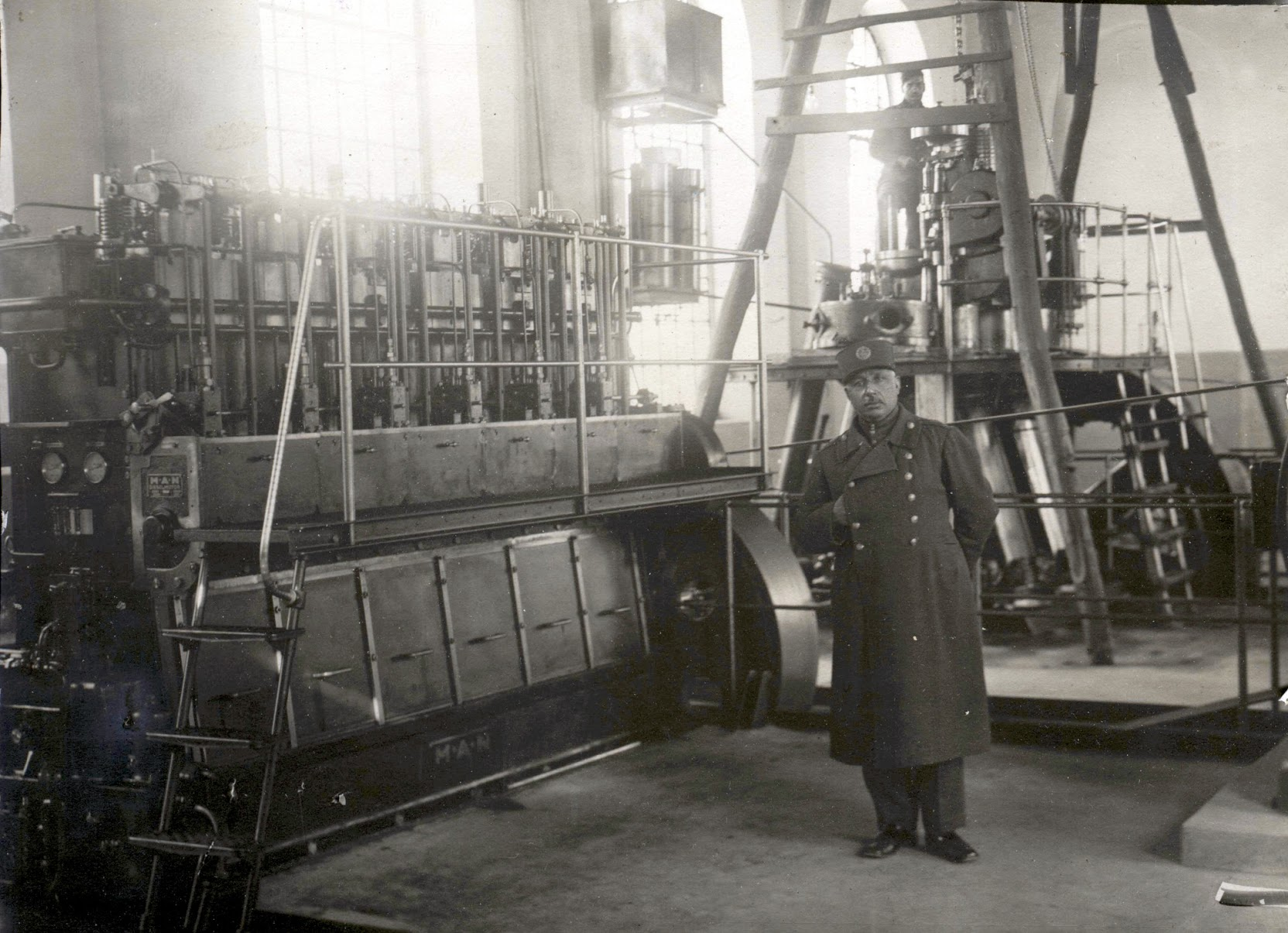
Sardar Homayoun at the first electricity plant in Tabriz

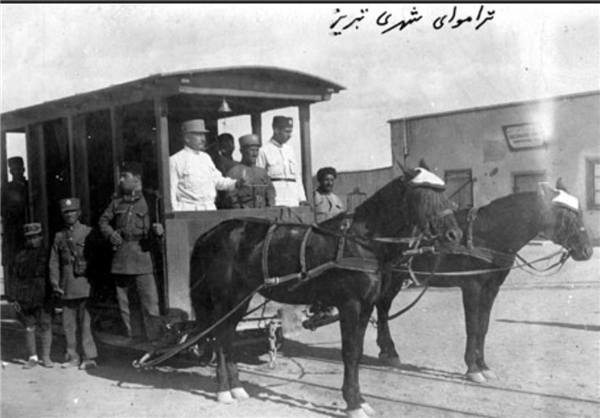
The first tramway in Tabriz
