= Qasemabad-e Gonbad =

Qasemabad-e Gonbad قاسم اباد گنبد
- Village
- Country: Iran
- Province: Sistan and Baluchestan
- County: Dalgan
- Bakhsh: Central
- Rural District: Dalgan

Population (2006)
  - Total: 302
- Time zone: UTC+3:30 (IRST)
  - Summer (DST): UTC+4:30 (IRDT)

Qasemabad-e Gonbad (Persian: قاسم اباد گنبد, also romanized as Qāsemābād-e Gonbad) is a village in Dalgan Rural District, in the Central District of Dalgan County, Sistan and Baluchestan Province, Iran. At the 2006 census, its population was 302, in 53 families.
