= Qasemabad, Koshkuiyeh =

Qasemabad قاسم آباد
- Village
- Location within Iran
- Coordinates: 30°31′33″N 55°40′17″E
- Country: Iran
- Province: Kerman
- County: Rafsanjan
- Bakhsh: Koshkuiyeh
- Rural District: Koshkuiyeh

Population (2006)
  - Total: 22
- Time zone: UTC+3:30 (IRST)
  - Summer (DST): UTC+4:30 (IRDT)

Qasemabad (Persian: قاسم آباد, also Romanized as Qāsemābād) is a village in Koshkuiyeh Rural District, Koshkuiyeh District, Rafsanjan County, Kerman Province, Iran. In the 2006 census, its population consisted of was 22 people, coming from 7 families.
