= Qasemabad, Khomeyn =

Qasemabad قاسم اباد
- Village
- Location within Iran
- Coordinates: 33°43′09″N 50°11′28″E
- Country: Iran
- Province: Markazi
- County: Khomeyn
- Bakhsh: Central
- Rural District: Salehan

Population (2006)
  - Total: 122
- Time zone: UTC+3:30 (IRST)
  - Summer (DST): UTC+4:30 (IRDT)

Qasemabad (Persian: قاسم اباد, also Romanized as Qāsemābād; also known as Ghasem Abad Hamzehloo) is a village in Salehan Rural District, in the Central District of Khomeyn County, Markazi Province, Iran. At the 2006 census, its population was 122, in 37 families.
