= Kazemabad, Kamyaran =

Village in Kurdistan, Iran

Kazemabad كاظم آباد
- Village
- Location within Iran
- Coordinates: 34°52′55″N 47°00′51″E
- Country: Iran
- Province: Kurdistan
- County: Kamyaran
- Bakhsh: Central
- Rural District: Bilavar

Population (2006)
  - Total: 69
- Time zone: UTC+3:30 (IRST)
  - Summer (DST): UTC+4:30 (IRDT)

Kazemabad (Persian: كاظم آباد, also Romanized as Kāz̧emābād) is a village in Bilavar Rural District, in the Central District of Kamyaran County, Kurdistan province, Iran. At the 2006 census, its population was 69, in 11 families. The village is populated by Kurds.
