= Qasemabad, Andika =

Qasemabad قاسم اباد
- Village
- Location within Iran
- Coordinates: 32°11′56″N 49°30′59″E
- Country: Iran
- Province: Khuzestan
- County: Andika
- Bakhsh: Central
- Rural District: Qaleh-ye Khvajeh

Population (2006)
  - Total: 305
- Time zone: UTC+3:30 (IRST)
  - Summer (DST): UTC+4:30 (IRDT)

Qasemabad (Persian: قاسم اباد, also Romanized as Qāsemābād; also known as Qāsemābād-e Dīneh Rāk and Qāsemīābād) is a village in Qaleh-ye Khvajeh Rural District, in the Central District of Andika County, Khuzestan Province, Iran. At the 2006 census, its population was 305, in 62 families.
