= Kazemabad, Fahraj =

Kazemabad كاظم اباد
- Village
- Location within Iran
- Coordinates: 28°48′00″N 59°10′00″E
- Country: Iran
- Province: Kerman
- County: Fahraj
- Bakhsh: Negin Kavir
- Rural District: Chahdegal

Population (2006)
  - Total: 54
- Time zone: UTC+3:30 (IRST)
  - Summer (DST): UTC+4:30 (IRDT)

Kazemabad (Persian: كاظم اباد, also Romanized as Kāz̧emābād) is a village in Chahdegal Rural District, Negin Kavir District, Fahraj County, Kerman province, Iran. At the 2006 census, its population was 54, in 13 families.
