= Qasemabad, Qazvineh =

Village in Kermanshah Province, Iran

Qasemabad قاسم‌آباد
- Village
- Location within Iran
- Coordinates: 34°33′17″N 47°43′48″E
- Country: Iran
- Province: Kermanshah
- County: Kangavar
- Bakhsh: Central
- Rural District: Qazvineh

Population (2006)
  - Total: 86
- Time zone: UTC+3:30 (IRST)
  - Summer (DST): UTC+4:30 (IRDT)

Qasemabad (Persian: قاسم‌آباد, also Romanized as Qāsemābād) is a village in Qazvineh Rural District, in the Central District of Kangavar County, Kermanshah Province, Iran. At the 2006 census, its population was 86, in 26 families.
