= Kazemabad, Rafsanjan =

Kazemabad كاظم اباد
- Village
- Location within Iran
- Coordinates: 30°25′34″N 55°50′29″E
- Country: Iran
- Province: Kerman
- County: Rafsanjan
- Bakhsh: Central
- Rural District: Eslamiyeh

Population (2006)
  - Total: 472
- Time zone: UTC+3:30 (IRST)
  - Summer (DST): UTC+4:30 (IRDT)

Kazemabad (Persian: كاظم اباد, also Romanized as Kāz̧emābād) is a village in Eslamiyeh Rural District, in the Central District of Rafsanjan County, Kerman province, Iran. At the 2006 census, its population was 472, in 117 families.
