= Qasemabad-e Veynesar =

Qasemabad-e Veynesar قاسم آباد وينسار
- Village
- Location within Iran
- Coordinates: 35°57′56″N 47°26′41″E
- Country: Iran
- Province: Kurdistan
- County: Bijar
- Bakhsh: Central
- Rural District: Howmeh

Population (2006)
  - Total: 48
- Time zone: UTC+3:30 (IRST)
  - Summer (DST): UTC+4:30 (IRDT)

Qasemabad-e Veynesar (Persian: قاسم آباد وينسار, also Romanized as Qāsemābād-e Veynesār and Qāsemābād-e Veynes̄ār; also known as Qāsemābād) is a village in Howmeh Rural District, in the Central District of Bijar County, Kurdistan Province, Iran. At the 2006 census, its population was 48, in 8 families. The village is populated by Kurds.
