= Kazemabad, Zeydabad =

Kazemabad كاظم اباد
- Village
- Location within Iran
- Coordinates: 29°33′57″N 55°33′03″E
- Country: Iran
- Province: Kerman
- County: Sirjan
- Bakhsh: Central
- Rural District: Zeydabad

Population (2006)
  - Total: 412
- Time zone: UTC+3:30 (IRST)
  - Summer (DST): UTC+4:30 (IRDT)

Kazemabad (Persian: كاظم اباد, also Romanized as Kāz̧emābād) is a village in Zeydabad Rural District, in the Central District of Sirjan County, German province, Iran. At the 2006 census, its population was 412, in 104 families.
