= Kazemabad, Qorveh =

Kazemabad كاظم آباد
- Village
- Location within Iran
- Coordinates: 35°13′59″N 47°33′19″E
- Country: Iran
- Province: Kurdistan
- County: Qorveh
- Bakhsh: Central
- Rural District: Panjeh Ali

Population (2006)
  - Total: 183
- Time zone: UTC+3:30 (IRST)
  - Summer (DST): UTC+4:30 (IRDT)

Kazemabad (Persian: كاظم آباد, also Romanized as Kāz̧emābād; also known as Kāzīmābād) is a village in Panjeh Ali Rural District, in the Central District of Qorveh County, Kurdistan Province, Iran. At the 2006 census, its population was 183, in 36 families. The village is populated by Kurds.
