= Tizabad, Kurdistan =

Tizabad تيز آباد
- Village
- Location within Iran
- Coordinates: 36°14′22″N 46°28′16″E
- Country: Iran
- Province: Kurdistan
- County: Saqqez
- Bakhsh: Ziviyeh
- Rural District: Saheb

Population (2006)
  - Total: 144
- Time zone: UTC+3:30 (IRST)
  - Summer (DST): UTC+4:30 (IRDT)

Tizabad (Persian: تيز آباد, also Romanized as Tīzābād) is a village in Saheb Rural District, Ziviyeh District, Saqqez County, Kurdistan Province, Iran. At the 2006 census, its population was 144, in 29 families. The village is populated by Kurds.
