= Sain Qaleh =

City in Zanjan province, Iran

Sain Qaleh Persian: صائين قلعه
- City
- Location within Iran
- Coordinates: 36°18′16″N 49°04′20″E
- Country: Iran
- Province: Zanjan
- County: Abhar
- District: Central

Population (2016)
  - Total: 12,989
- Time zone: UTC+3:30 (IRST)

Sain Qaleh (Persian: صائين قلعه) (Note: Also romanized as Şā’īn Qal‘eh; also known as Khorosan and Sain-Kalekh) is a city in the Central District of Abhar County, Zanjan province, Iran.

== Demographics ==
=== Population ===
At the time of the 2006 National Census, the city's population was 11,083 in 2,896 households. The following census in 2011 counted 11,939 people in 3,470 households. The 2016 census measured the population of the city as 12,989 people in 4,048 households.

== In literature ==
The 14th-century author Hamdallah Mustawfi mentioned Sa'in Qal'eh in his Nuzhat al-Qulub: he referred to "the village called Quhūd, which the Mongols call Sāin Qal'ah, and which is the chief of all those neighboring hamlets". He also wrote that it was close to the castle of Sarjahan.

== Notable people ==
- Ibrahim al-Musawi al-Zanjani (1925–1999), Islamic scholar and writer.
