= Qasemabad-e Jalil =

Qasemabad-e Jalil قاسم ابادجليل
- Village
- Location within Iran
- Coordinates: 30°37′59″N 51°18′21″E
- Country: Iran
- Province: Kohgiluyeh and Boyer-Ahmad
- County: Boyer-Ahmad
- Bakhsh: Central
- Rural District: Sepidar

Population (2006)
  - Total: 317
- Time zone: UTC+3:30 (IRST)
  - Summer (DST): UTC+4:30 (IRDT)

Qasemabad-e Jalil (Persian: قاسم ابادجليل, also Romanized as Qāsemābād-e Jalīl) is a village in Sepidar Rural District, in the Central District of Boyer-Ahmad County, Kohgiluyeh and Boyer-Ahmad Province, Iran. At the 2006 census, its population was 317, in 63 families.
