= Qasimabad, Punjab =

Qasimabad
- Location within Pakistan
- Coordinates: 30.30°N 72.36°E
- Country: Pakistan
- Province: Punjab
- District: Sahiwal
- Elevation: 156 m (512 ft)
- Time zone: UTC+5 (PST)

Qasimabad is a town of Sahiwal District in the Punjab province of Pakistan. It is located at 30°30'0N 72°36'0E with an altitude of 156 metres (515 feet). Neighbouring settlements include Shujabad and Asghari.
