= Aliabad-e Bar Anazar =

Aliabad-e Bar Anazar علي آباد برانازار
- Village
- Location within Iran
- Coordinates: 33°57′19″N 47°50′03″E
- Country: Iran
- Province: Lorestan
- County: Selseleh
- Bakhsh: Firuzabad
- Rural District: Qalayi

Population (2006)
  - Total: 42
- Time zone: UTC+3:30 (IRST)
  - Summer (DST): UTC+4:30 (IRDT)

Aliabad-e Bar Anazar (Persian: علي آباد برانازار, also Romanized as ‘Alīābād-e Bar Ānāzār; also known as Kāz̧emābād and Kāz̧emābād-e Sūrcham) is a village in Qalayi Rural District, Firuzabad District, Selseleh County, Lorestan province, Iran. At the 2006 census, its population was 42, in 11 families.
