= Kazemabad, Shahdad =

Kazemabad كاظم اباد
- Village
- Location within Iran
- Coordinates: 30°22′03″N 57°32′48″E
- Country: Iran
- Province: Kerman
- County: Kerman
- Bakhsh: Shahdad
- Rural District: Sirch

Population (2006)
  - Total: 85
- Time zone: UTC+3:30 (IRST)
  - Summer (DST): UTC+4:30 (IRDT)

Kazemabad (Persian: كاظم اباد, also Romanized as Kāz̧emābād) is a village in Sirch Rural District, Shahdad District, Kerman County, Kerman province, Iran. At the 2006 census, its population was 85, in 20 families.
