= Qasemabad, Gilan-e Gharb =

Qasemabad قاسم‌آباد
- Village
- Location within Iran
- Coordinates: 34°18′09″N 45°47′12″E
- Country: Iran
- Province: Kermanshah
- County: Gilan-e Gharb
- Bakhsh: Central
- Rural District: Howmeh

Population (2006)
  - Total: 241
- Time zone: UTC+3:30 (IRST)
  - Summer (DST): UTC+4:30 (IRDT)

Qasemabad (Persian: قاسم‌آباد, also Romanized as Qāsemābād; also known as Qāsemābān) is a village in Howmeh Rural District, in the Central District of Gilan-e Gharb County, Kermanshah Province, Iran. At the 2006 census, its population was 241, in 53 families. The village is populated by Kurds.
