= Qasemabad, Marvdasht =

Qasemabad قاسم اباد
- Village
- Location within Iran
- Coordinates: 29°57′13″N 52°40′57″E
- Country: Iran
- Province: Fars
- County: Marvdasht
- Bakhsh: Central
- Rural District: Ramjerd-e Yek

Population (2006)
  - Total: 760
- Time zone: UTC+3:30 (IRST)
  - Summer (DST): UTC+4:30 (IRDT)

Qasemabad (Persian: قاسم اباد, also Romanized as Qāsemābād; also known as Ghasem Abad Ramjerd and Qāsemābād-e Rāmjerd) is a village in Ramjerd-e Yek Rural District, in the Central District of Marvdasht County, Fars province, Iran. At the 2006 census, its population was 760, in 174 families.
