= Qasemabad-e Pir Almas =

Qasemabad-e Pir Almas قاسم ابادپيرالماس
- Village
- Location within Iran
- Coordinates: 28°44′36″N 58°51′32″E
- Country: Iran
- Province: Kerman
- County: Rigan
- Bakhsh: Gonbaki
- Rural District: Gonbaki

Population (2006)
  - Total: 713
- Time zone: UTC+3:30 (IRST)
  - Summer (DST): UTC+4:30 (IRDT)

Qasemabad-e Pir Almas (Persian: قاسم ابادپيرالماس, also Romanized as Qāsemābād-e Pīr Almās; also known as Qāsemābād and Qāsemābād-e Gonbagī) is a village in Gonbaki Rural District, Gonbaki District, Rigan County, Kerman Province, Iran. At the 2006 census, its population was 713 in 156 families.
