= Kazemabad, Bezenjan =

Kazemabad كاظم اباد
- Village
- Location within Iran
- Coordinates: 29°10′46″N 56°36′07″E
- Country: Iran
- Province: Kerman
- County: Baft
- Bakhsh: Central
- Rural District: Bezenjan

Population (2006)
  - Total: 27
- Time zone: UTC+3:30 (IRST)
  - Summer (DST): UTC+4:30 (IRDT)

Kazemabad (Persian: كاظم اباد, also Romanized as Kāz̧emābād) is a village in Bezenjan Rural District, in the Central District of Baft County, Kerman province, Iran. At the 2006 census, its population was 27, in 5 families.
