= Kazemabad, Khomeyn =

Kazemabad كاظماباد
- Village
- Location within Iran
- Coordinates: 33°31′56″N 49°47′06″E
- Country: Iran
- Province: Markazi
- County: Khomeyn
- Bakhsh: Kamareh
- Rural District: Chahar Cheshmeh

Population (2006)
  - Total: 166
- Time zone: UTC+3:30 (IRST)
  - Summer (DST): UTC+4:30 (IRDT)

Kazemabad (Persian: كاظماباد, also Romanized as Kāz̧emābād and Khazmābād) is a village in Chahar Cheshmeh Rural District, Kamareh District, Khomeyn County, Markazi Province, Iran. At the 2006 census, its population was 166, in 42 families.
