= Kazemabad, Nishapur =

Kazemabad كاظم اباد
- Village
- Location within Iran
- Coordinates: 36°02′30″N 58°47′26″E
- Country: Iran
- Province: Razavi Khorasan
- County: Nishapur
- Bakhsh: Central
- Rural District: Darbqazi

Population (2006)
  - Total: 55
- Time zone: UTC+3:30 (IRST)
  - Summer (DST): UTC+4:30 (IRDT)

Kazemabad (Persian: كاظم اباد, also Romanized as Kāz̧emābād) is a village in Darbqazi Rural District, in the Central District of Nishapur County, Razavi Khorasan province, Iran. At the 2006 census, its population was 55, in 9 families.
