= Qasemabad, Hormozgan =

Qasemabad قاسم آباد
- Village
- Location within Iran
- Coordinates: 27°10′48″N 53°08′19″E
- Country: Iran
- Province: Hormozgan
- County: Parsian
- Bakhsh: Central
- Rural District: Mehregan

Population (2006)
  - Total: 49
- Time zone: UTC+3:30 (IRST)
  - Summer (DST): UTC+4:30 (IRDT)

Qasemabad (Persian: قاسم آباد, also Romanized as Qāsemābād) is a village in Mehregan Rural District, in the Central District of Parsian County, Hormozgan Province, Iran. At the 2006 census, its population was 49, in 11 families.
