= Qasimpur =

Qasimpur or Kashimpur may refer to:

== Bangladesh ==
- Kashimpur Central Jail, Gazipur
- Kashimpur Union, Jessore

== India ==
- Kashimpur (village), near Duttapukur, North 24 Parganas district, West Bengal
- Qasimpur Power House Colony, Ghazipur
- Qasimpur Baghel, Ghazipur

== See also ==
- Qasimabad, a related name also referring to several places
