= Kolaabad =

Kolaabad كل اباد
- Village
- Location within Iran
- Coordinates: 28°30′55″N 57°45′48″E
- Country: Iran
- Province: Kerman
- County: Anbarabad
- Bakhsh: Esmaili
- Rural District: Hoseynabad

Population (2006)
  - Total: 358
- Time zone: UTC+3:30 (IRST)
  - Summer (DST): UTC+4:30 (IRDT)

Kolaabad (Persian: كل اباد, also Romanized as Kolāābād; also known as Kolāhābād and Qāsemābād) is a village in Hoseynabad Rural District, Esmaili District, Anbarabad County, Kerman Province, Iran. At the 2006 census, its population was 358, in 67 families.
