= Kazımabad =

- Municipality
- Location within Azerbaijan
- Coordinates: 39°08′08″N 48°39′13″E
- Country: Azerbaijan
- Rayon: Jalilabad

Population
  - Total: 2,254
- Time zone: UTC+4 (AZT)
  - Summer (DST): UTC+5 (AZT)

Kazımabad is a village and municipality in the Jalilabad Rayon of Azerbaijan. It has a population of 2,254.
