= Kazemabad, Gilan =

Kazemabad كاظم اباد
- Village
- Location within Iran
- Coordinates: 37°06′45″N 49°25′10″E
- Country: Iran
- Province: Gilan
- County: Shaft
- Bakhsh: Ahmadsargurab
- Rural District: Chubar

Population (2006)
  - Total: 383
- Time zone: UTC+3:30 (IRST)
  - Summer (DST): UTC+4:30 (IRDT)

Kazemabad (Persian: كاظم اباد, also Romanized as Kāz̧emābād) is a village in Chubar Rural District, Ahmadsargurab District, Shaft County, Gilan province, Iran. At the 2006 census, its population was 383, in 124 families.
