= Qasemabad, Sirjan =

Qasemabad قاسم اباد
- Village
- Location within Iran
- Coordinates: 29°19′08″N 55°50′07″E
- Country: Iran
- Province: Kerman
- County: Sirjan
- Bakhsh: Central
- Rural District: Malekabad

Population (2006)
  - Total: 426
- Time zone: UTC+3:30 (IRST)
  - Summer (DST): UTC+4:30 (IRDT)

Qasemabad (Persian: قاسم اباد, also Romanized as Qāsemābād) is a village in Malekabad Rural District, in the Central District of Sirjan County, Kerman Province, Iran. At the 2006 census, its population was 426, in 99 families.
