= Qasimiya =

Branch of the Naqshbandi order

Qasimiya or the Qasimi order, is a Naqshbandi branch in origin, and is based in a small village called Mohra Sharif located in the Murree hills of Punjab, Pakistan close to the Pakistani capital of Islamabad.
