= Qasemabad, Sarakhs =

Village in Razavi Khorasan province, Iran

Qasemabad Persian: قاسم اباد
- Village
- Location within Iran
- Coordinates: 36°18′28″N 61°09′00″E
- Country: Iran
- Province: Razavi Khorasan
- County: Sarakhs
- District: Central
- Rural District: Tajan

Population (2016)
  - Total: 104
- Time zone: UTC+3:30 (IRST)

Qasemabad (Persian: قاسم اباد) (Note: Also romanized as Qāsemabād; also known as Kalāteh-ye Qāsemābād and Qāsem Khān) is a village in Tajan Rural District of the Central District in Sarakhs County, Razavi Khorasan province, Iran.

== Demographics ==
=== Population ===
At the time of the 2006 National Census, the village's population was 103 in 30 households. The following census in 2011 counted 84 people in 24 households. The 2016 census measured the population of the village as 104 people in 28 households.
