= Korehi =

City in Fars province, Iran

Korehi Persian: کره‌ای
- City
- Location within Iran
- Coordinates: 30°01′59″N 53°43′04″E
- Country: Iran
- Province: Fars
- County: Sarchehan
- District: Central

Population (2016)
  - Total: 3,954
- Time zone: UTC+3:30 (IRST)

Korehi (Persian: کره‌ای) (Note: Also known as Chār Rāh, Katra, Katreh, Koreh, Korei, and Korreh) is a city in the Central District of Sarchehan County, Fars province, Iran, serving as capital of the county. It was the capital of the district until its capital was transferred to the city of Hesami. As a village, Korehi was the capital of Sarchehan Rural District until its capital was transferred to the village of Siyahun.

== Demographics ==
=== Population ===
At the time of the 2006 National Census, the city's population was 3,158 in 807 households, when it was capital of the former Sarchehan District of Bavanat County. The following census in 2011 counted 3,912 people in 1,027 households. The 2016 census measured the population of the city as 3,954 people in 1,259 households.

After the census, the district was separated from the county in the establishment of Sarchehan County, and Korehi was transferred to the new Central District as the county's capital.
