= Qasemabad, Khorramdasht =

Village in Qazvin province, Iran

Qasemabad Persian: قاسم اباد
- Village
- Location within Iran
- Coordinates: 35°56′35″N 49°32′46″E
- Country: Iran
- Province: Qazvin
- County: Takestan
- District: Khorramdasht
- Rural District: Ramand-e Shomali

Population (2016)
  - Total: 539
- Time zone: UTC+3:30 (IRST)

Qasemabad (Persian: قاسم اباد) (Note: Also romanized as Qāsemābād; also known as Qal‘eh-ye Qāsemābād) is a village in Ramand-e Shomali Rural District of Khorramdasht District in Takestan County, Qazvin province, Iran.

== Demographics ==
=== Population ===
At the time of the 2006 National Census, the village's population was 598 in 177 households. The following census in 2011 counted 585 people in 190 households. The 2016 census measured the population of the village as 539 people in 174 households.
