= Bagh Safa District =

District in Fars province, Iran

Bagh Safa District Persian: بخش باغ صفا
- District
- Location within Iran
- Coordinates: 30°11′26″N 53°30′41″E
- Country: Iran
- Province: Fars
- County: Sarchehan
- Capital: Bagh Safa
- Time zone: UTC+3:30 (IRST)

Bagh Safa District (Persian: بخش باغ صفا) is in Sarchehan County, Fars province, Iran. Its capital is the city of Bagh Safa, whose population at the time of the 2016 National Census was 908 people in 276 households.

== History ==
After the 2016 census, Sarchehan District was separated from Bavanat County in the establishment of Sarchehan County, which was divided into two districts of two rural districts each, with the city of Korehi as its capital. After formation of the county, the village of Bagh Safa was elevated to the status of a city.

== Demographics ==
=== Administrative divisions ===
Bagh Safa District
Administrative Divisions
Arzhang RD
Bagh Safa RD
Bagh Safa (city) (Note: Became a city after county formation)
RD = Rural District
