= Radekan, Qazvin =

Village in Qazvin province, Iran

Radekan Persian: رادكان
- Village
- Location within Iran
- Coordinates: 35°59′21″N 49°34′44″E
- Country: Iran
- Province: Qazvin
- County: Takestan
- District: Khorramdasht
- Rural District: Ramand-e Shomali

Population (2016)
  - Total: 2,306
- Time zone: UTC+3:30 (IRST)

Radekan (Persian: رادكان) (Note: Also romanized as Rādekān and Rādkān; also known as Rakan) is a village in Ramand-e Shomali Rural District of Khorramdasht District in Takestan County, Qazvin province, Iran.

== Demographics ==
=== Population ===
At the time of the 2006 National Census, the village's population was 2,092 in 530 households. The following census in 2011 counted 2,233 people in 662 households. The 2016 census measured the population of the village as 2,306 people in 717 households. It was the most populous village in its rural district.
