= Qasemabad, Sepidan =

Qasemabad قاسم اباد
- Village
- Location within Iran
- Coordinates: 30°00′08″N 52°25′04″E
- Country: Iran
- Province: Fars
- County: Sepidan
- Bakhsh: Beyza
- Rural District: Beyza

Population (2006)
  - Total: 356
- Time zone: UTC+3:30 (IRST)
  - Summer (DST): UTC+4:30 (IRDT)

Qasemabad (Persian: قاسم اباد, also Romanized as Qāsemābād; also known as Kāz̧emābād and Qāsimābād) is a village in Beyza Rural District, Beyza District, Sepidan County, Fars province, Iran. At the 2006 census, its population was 356, in 86 families.
