= Qasemabad, Rafsanjan =

Qasemabad قاسم اباد
- Village
- Location within Iran
- Coordinates: 30°18′20″N 56°29′08″E
- Country: Iran
- Province: Kerman
- County: Rafsanjan
- Bakhsh: Central
- Rural District: Kabutar Khan

Population (2006)
  - Total: 176
- Time zone: UTC+3:30 (IRST)
  - Summer (DST): UTC+4:30 (IRDT)

Qasemabad (Persian: قاسم اباد, also Romanized as Qāsemābād; also known as Kāz̧emābād and Qāsimābād) is a village in Kabutar Khan Rural District, in the Central District of Rafsanjan County, Kerman Province, Iran. At the 2006 census, its population was 176, in 43 families.
