= Qasemabad, Takestan =

Qasemabad قاسم اباد
- Village
- Location within Iran
- Coordinates: 36°09′26″N 49°41′29″E
- Country: Iran
- Province: Qazvin
- County: Takestan
- Bakhsh: Central
- Rural District: Qaqazan-e Sharqi

Population (2006)
  - Total: 91
- Time zone: UTC+3:30 (IRST)
  - Summer (DST): UTC+4:30 (IRDT)

Qasemabad (Persian: قاسم اباد, also Romanized as Qāsemābād; also known as Kasiabad, Yang-Kalekh, Yang Qal‘eh, and Yengī Qal‘eh) is a village in Qaqazan-e Sharqi Rural District, in the Central District of Takestan County, Qazvin Province, Iran. At the 2006 census, its population was 91, in 21 families.
