= Central District (Sarchehan County) =

District in Fars province, Iran

Central District (Sarchehan County) Persian: بخش مرکزی شهرستان سرچهان
- District
- Location within Iran
- Coordinates: 30°02′35″N 53°46′58″E
- Country: Iran
- Province: Fars
- County: Sarchehan
- Capital: Hesami
- Time zone: UTC+3:30 (IRST)

The Central District of Sarchehan County (Persian: بخش مرکزی شهرستان سرچهان) is in Fars province, Iran. Its capital is the city of Hesami, whose population at the time of the 2016 National Census was 3,954 people in 1,259 households. The previous capital of the district was the city of Korehi.

== History ==
After the 2016 census, Sarchehan District was separated from Bavanat County in the establishment of Sarchehan County, which was divided into two districts of two rural districts each, with Korehi as its capital. After formation of the county, Hesami Rural District was created in the Central District, and Tujerdi Rural District was separated from it in the formation of Tujerdi District. The capital of the Central District was moved from Korehi to Hesami.

== Demographics ==
=== Administrative divisions ===
Central District (Sarchehan County)
Administrative Divisions
Hesami RD
Sarchehan RD
Tujerdi RD (Note: Transferred to Tujerdi District)
Hesami (city)
Korehi (city)
RD = Rural District
