= Sarchehan County =

County in Fars province, Iran

Sarchehan County Persian: شهرستان سرچهان
- County
- Location of Sarchehan County in Fars province (center, pink)

- Location of Fars province in Iran
- Coordinates: 30°05′N 53°42′E
- Country: Iran
- Province: Fars
- Capital: Korehi
- Districts: Central, Bagh Safa, Tujerdi
- Time zone: UTC+3:30 (IRST)

Sarchehan County (Persian: شهرستان سرچهان) is in Fars province, Iran. Its capital is the city of Korehi, whose population at the time of the 2016 National Census was 3,954 people in 1,259 households.

== History ==
After the 2016 census, Sarchehan District was separated from Bavanat County in the establishment of Sarchehan County, which was divided into two districts of two rural districts each, with Korehi as its capital.

After formation of the county, Hesami Rural District was created in the Central District, and Tujerdi Rural District was separated from it in the formation of Tujerdi District, which was divided into two rural districts including the new Marvashkan Rural District. The capital of the Central District was moved from Korehi to Hesami. In addition, the villages of Bagh Safa and Tujerdi were elevated to city status.

== Administrative divisions ==
Sarchehan County's administrative structure is shown in the following table.

Sarchehan County
Administrative Divisions
Central District
Hesami RD
Sarchehan RD
Tujerdi RD
Hesami (city)
Korehi (city)
Bagh Safa District
Arzhang RD
Bagh Safa RD
Bagh Safa (city) (Note: Became a city after county formation)
Tujerdi District
Marvashkan RD
Tujerdi RD
Tujerdi (city) (Note: Became a city after county formation)
RD = Rural District

== See also ==
Media related to Sarchehan County at Wikimedia Commons
