= Tujerdi Rural District =

Rural district in Fars province, Iran

Tujerdi Rural District Persian: دهستان توجردئ
- Rural District
- Location within Iran
- Coordinates: 29°55′47″N 54°01′26″E
- Country: Iran
- Province: Fars
- County: Sarchehan
- District: Tujerdi
- Capital: Tujerdi

Population (2016)
  - Total: 7,337
- Time zone: UTC+3:30 (IRST)

Tujerdi Rural District (Persian: دهستان توجردئ) is in Tujerdi District of Sarchehan County, Fars province, Iran. It is administered from the city of Tujerdi.

== Demographics ==
=== Population ===
At the time of the 2006 National Census, the rural district's population (as a part of the former Sarchehan District of Bavanat County) was 1,496 in 1,496 households. There were 7,626 inhabitants in 2,076 households at the following census of 2011. The 2016 census measured the population of the rural district as 7,337 in 2,224 households. The most populous of its 40 villages was Tujerdi (now a city), with 2,021 people.

After the census, the district was separated from the county in the establishment of Sarchehan County, and the rural district was transferred to the new Central District. After formation of the county, the rural district was separated from the district in the formation of Tujerdi District.
