= Sarchehan Rural District =

Rural district in Fars province, Iran

Sarchehan Rural District Persian: دهستان سرچهان
- Rural District
- Location within Iran
- Coordinates: 30°05′18″N 53°42′32″E
- Country: Iran
- Province: Fars
- County: Sarchehan
- District: Central
- Capital: Siyahun

Population (2016)
  - Total: 3,703
- Time zone: UTC+3:30 (IRST)

Sarchehan Rural District (Persian: دهستان سرچهان) is in the Central District of Sarchehan County, Fars province, Iran. Its capital is the village of Siyahun. The previous capital of the rural district was the village of Korehi, now a city.

== Demographics ==
=== Population ===
At the time of the 2006 National Census, the rural district's population (as a part of the former Sarchehan District of Bavanat County) was 5,002 in 1,211 households. There were 2,925 inhabitants in 776 households at the following census of 2011. The 2016 census measured the population of the rural district as 3,703 in 1,156 households. The most populous of its 63 villages was Jamalabad, with 724 people.

After the census, the district was separated from the county in the establishment of Sarchehan County, and the rural district was transferred to the new Central District.
