= Bagh Safa Rural District =

Rural district in Fars province, Iran

Bagh Safa Rural District Persian: دهستان باغ صفا
- Rural District
- Location within Iran
- Coordinates: 30°13′49″N 53°28′50″E
- Country: Iran
- Province: Fars
- County: Sarchehan
- District: Bagh Safa
- Capital: Bagh Safa

Population (2016)
  - Total: 5,004
- Time zone: UTC+3:30 (IRST)

Bagh Safa Rural District (Persian: دهستان باغ صفا) is in Bagh Safa District of Sarchehan County, Fars province, Iran. It is administered from the city of Bagh Safa.

== Demographics ==
=== Population ===
At the time of the 2006 National Census, the rural district's population (as a part of the former Sarchehan District of Bavanat County) was 4,432 in 1,055 households. There were 5,203 inhabitants in 1,424 households at the following census of 2011. The 2016 census measured the population of the rural district as 5,004 in 1,538 households. The most populous of its 60 villages was Kupan, with 925 people.

After the census, the district was separated from the county in the establishment of Sarchehan County, and the rural district was transferred to the new Bagh Safa District.
