= Sarchehan District =

Former district in Fars province, Iran

Sarchehan District Persian: بخش سرچهان
- Former District
- Location within Iran
- Coordinates: 30°05′N 53°42′E
- Country: Iran
- Province: Fars
- County: Bavanat
- Capital: Korehi

Population (2016)
  - Total: 23,129
- Time zone: UTC+3:30 (IRST)

Sarchehan District (Persian: بخش سرچهان) is a former administrative division of Bavanat County, Fars province, Iran. Its capital was the city of Korehi.

== History ==
After the 2016 National Census, the district was separated from the county in the establishment of Sarchehan County.

== Demographics ==
=== Population ===
At the time of the 2006 census, the district's population was 18,933 in 4,569 households. The following census in 2011 counted 22,492 people in 6,074 households. The 2016 census measured the population of the district as 23,129 inhabitants in 7,177 households.

=== Administrative divisions ===
Sarchehan District Population
Administrative Divisions	2006	2011	2016
Bagh Safa RD	4,432	5,203	5,004
Sarchehan RD	5,002	2,925	3,703
Tujerdi RD	6,341	7,626	7,337
Hesami (city)		2,826	3,131
Korehi (city)	3,158	3,912	3,954
Total	18,933	22,492	23,129
RD = Rural District
