= International vehicle registration code =

Codes used to identify where a vehicle is registered

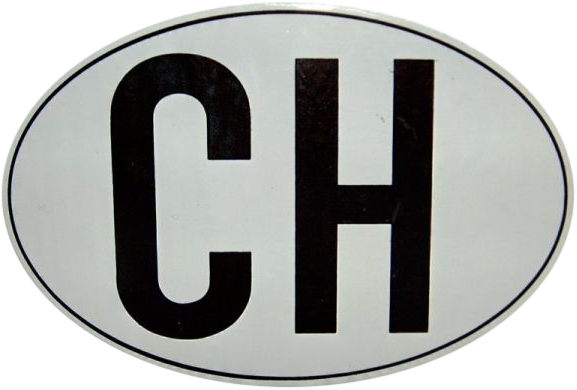
Example of a white oval plate or sticker; this one represents Switzerland

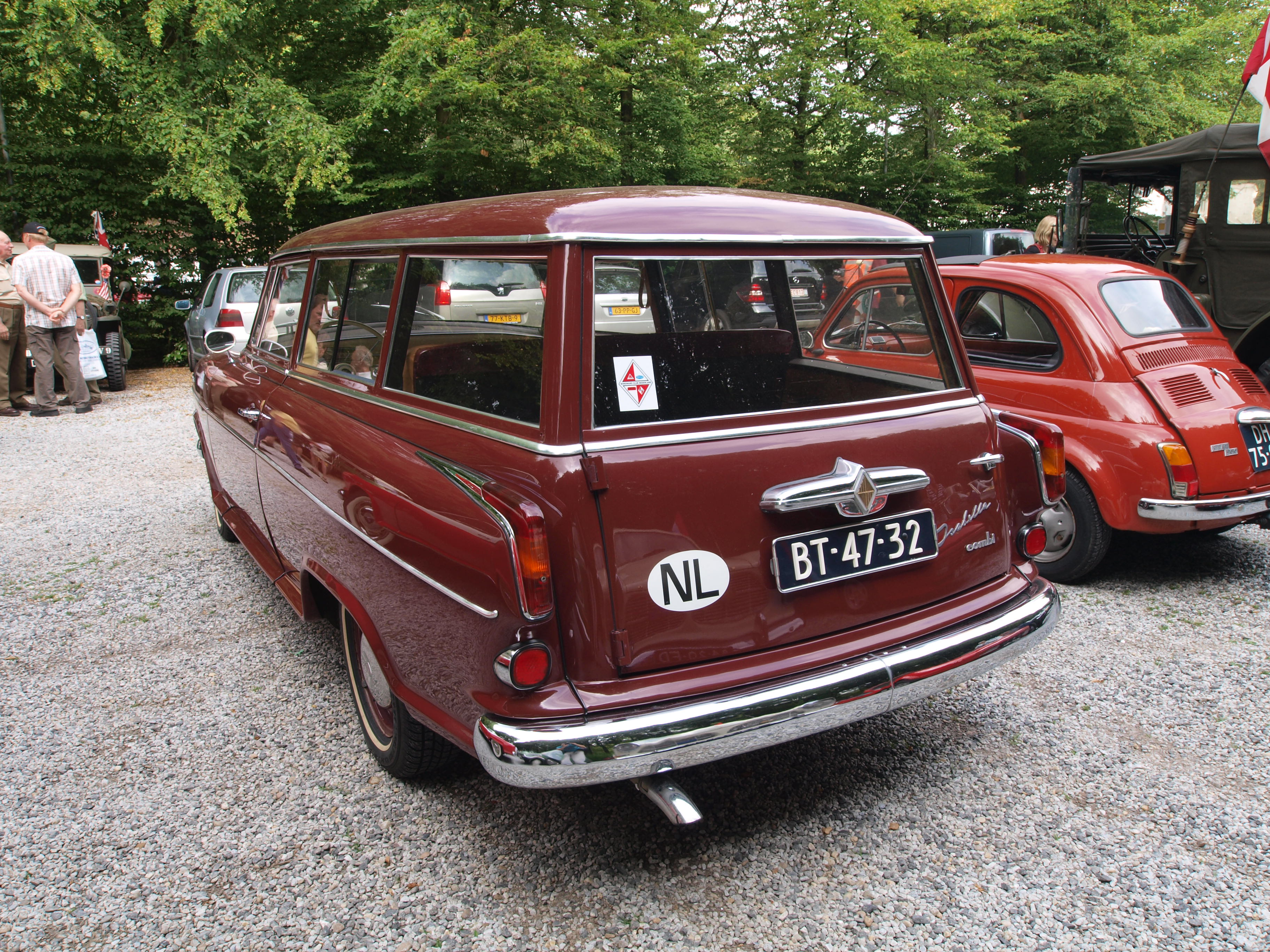
A 1960 Borgward Isabella showing the international vehicle code NL (Netherlands)

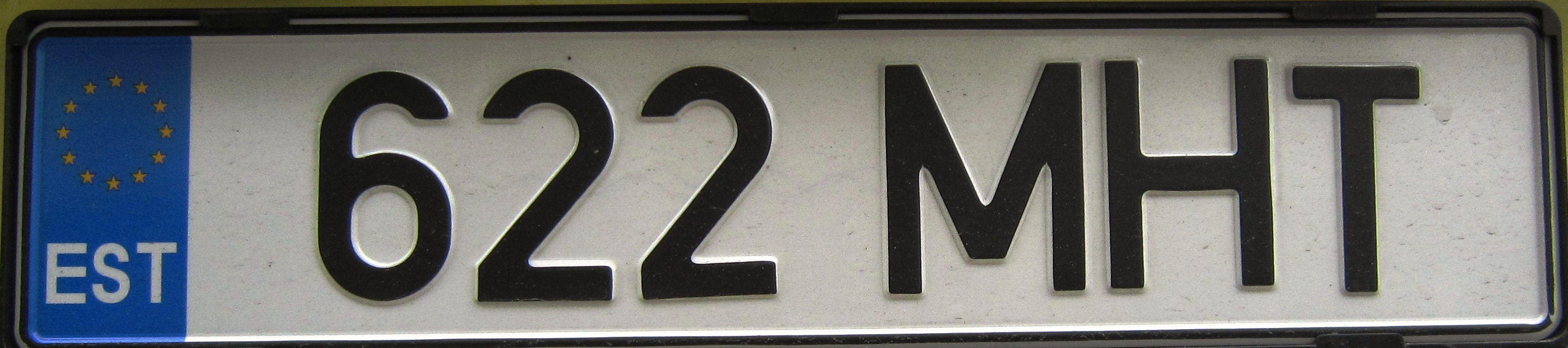
Estonian registration plate in EU standard format with international code EST

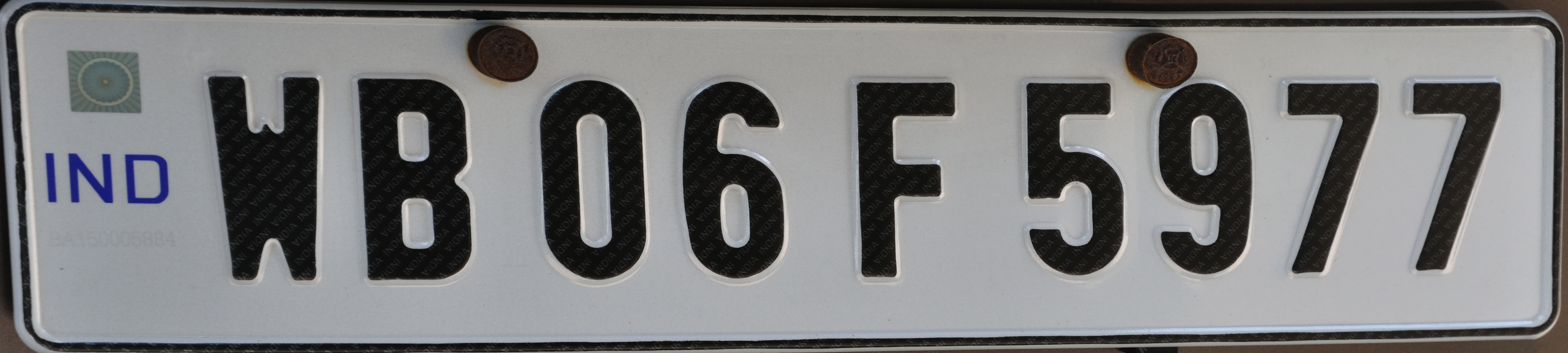
Indian vehicle registration plate in Indian standard format with international code IND

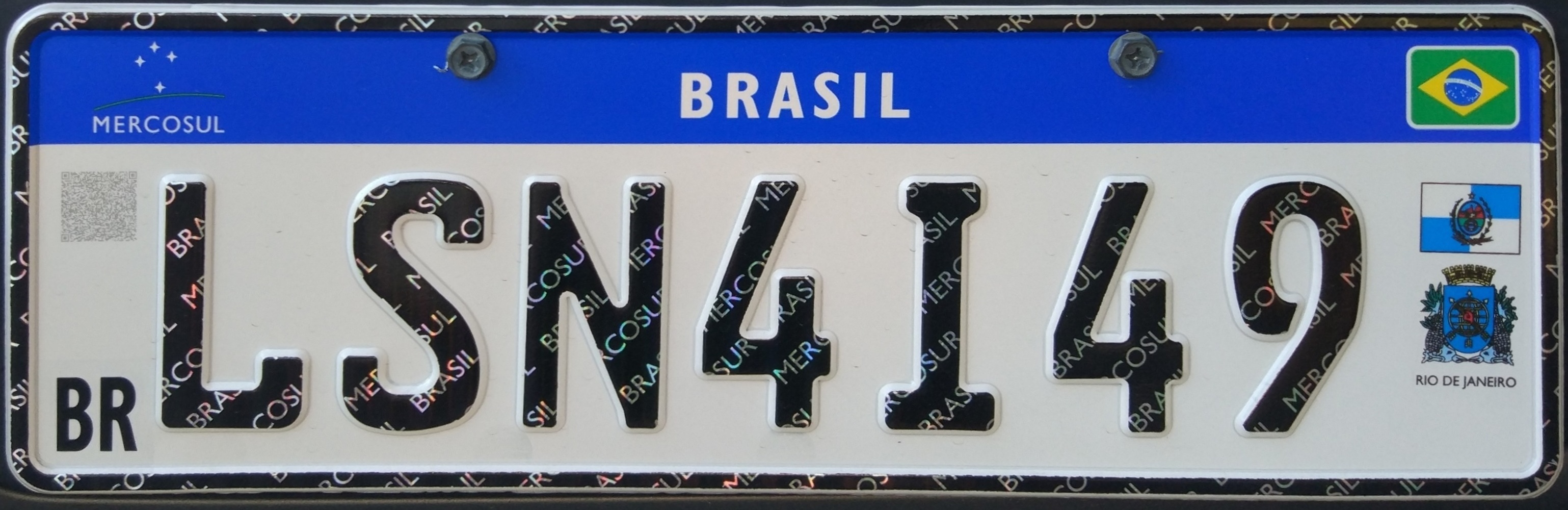
Brazilian vehicle registration plate in Mercosur standard format with international code BR

The country in which a motor vehicle's vehicle registration plate was issued may be indicated by an international vehicle registration code, also called Vehicle Registration Identification code or VRI code, formerly known as an International Registration Letter or International Circulation Mark. It is referred to as the Distinguishing sign of the State of registration in the Geneva Convention on Road Traffic of 1949 and the Vienna Convention on Road Traffic of 1968.

The allocation of codes is maintained by the United Nations Economic Commission for Europe as the Distinguishing Signs Used on Vehicles in International Traffic (sometimes abbreviated to DSIT), authorised by the UN's Geneva Convention on Road Traffic and the Vienna Convention on Road Traffic. Many vehicle codes created since the adoption of ISO 3166 coincide with ISO two- or three-letter codes. The 2004 South-East Asian Agreement ... for the Facilitation of Cross-Border Transport of Goods and People uses a mixture of ISO and DSIT codes: Myanmar uses MYA, China CHN, and Cambodia KH (ISO codes), Thailand uses T (DSIT code), Laos LAO, and Vietnam VN (coincident ISO and DSIT codes).

The Geneva Convention on Road Traffic entered into force on 26 March 1952. One of the main benefits of the convention for motorists is the obligation on signatory countries to recognize the legality of vehicles from other signatory countries. When driving in other signatory countries, the distinguishing sign of the country of registration must be displayed on the rear of the vehicle. This sign must be placed separately from the registration plate and may not be incorporated into the vehicle registration plate.

== History ==
=== 1909 Paris Convention ===
The display of a national distinctive mark on a white oval plate, 30 cm × 18 cm (12 in × 7 in) with black letters was first introduced by the 1909 International Convention with respect to the Circulation of Motor Vehicles signed in Paris. The plate was required to be affixed to the rear of the vehicle, separate from the number plate displaying the vehicle's national registration mark. The 1909 convention only allowed distinctive marks to be of one or two Latin letters.

1909 Paris Convention distinctive marks
State	Mark
Austrian Empire	A
Belgium	B
Bulgaria	BG
France	F
Germany	D
Great Britain and Ireland	GB
Kingdom of Greece	GR
Hungary	H
Kingdom of Italy	I
Monaco	MC
Montenegro	MN
The Netherlands	NL
Kingdom of Portugal	P
Romania	RO
Russian Empire	R
Serbia	SB
Spain	E
Sweden	S
Switzerland	CH
United States of America	US

=== 1924 Paris Convention ===
The term distinguishing mark was adopted by the 1924 International Convention Relative to Motor Traffic signed in Paris, which extended the maximum length of mark from two to three Latin letters, and permitted distinguishing marks not just for states, but also for non-sovereign territories which operated their own vehicle registration systems.

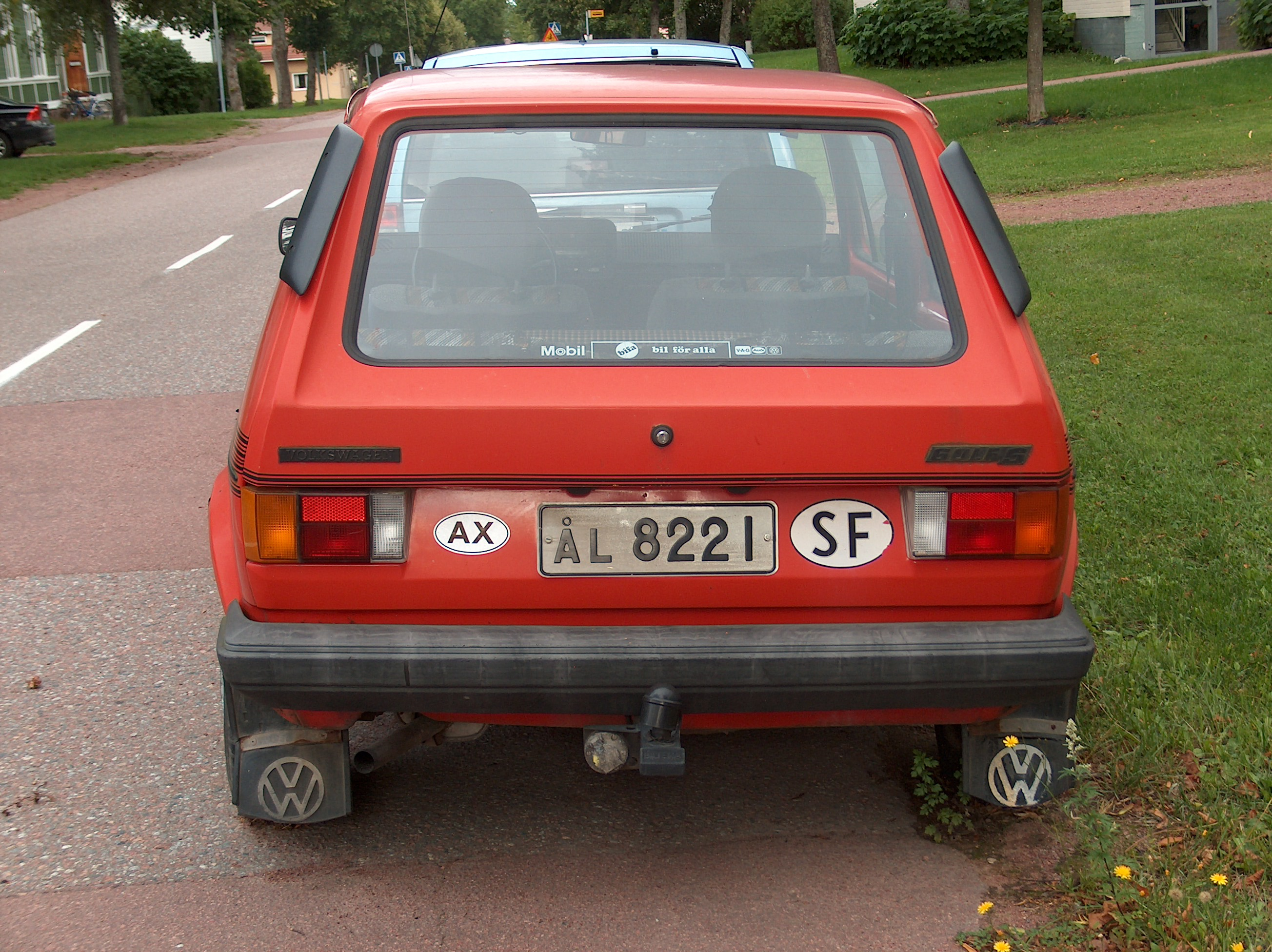
Volkswagen Golf Mk1 with both International vehicle registration codes, the Åland Islands (AX) and Finland (SF)

1924 Paris Convention distinguishing marks
State or territory	Mark	Notes
Alderney	GBA	
Austria	A (Note: Originally in 1909 convention)	
Belgium	B	
Brazil	BR	
British India	BI	
Bulgaria	BG	
Chile	RCH	
China	RC	
Colombia	CO	
Cuba	C	
Czechoslovakia	CS	
Danzig	DA	
Denmark	DK	
Dutch East Indies	IN	
Ecuador	EQ	
Egypt	ET	Current code is EG.
Estonia	EST	
Finland	SF	From Finnish Suomi, Swedish Finland. The latter because Swedish is the second official language in Finland.
France, Algeria and Tunis	F	
French India	F	
Germany	D	For Deutschland
Gibraltar	GBZ	
Great Britain and Northern Ireland	GB	
Greece	GR	
Guatemala	G	
Guernsey	GBG	
Haiti	RH	
Hungary	H	
Irish Free State	SE	Part of the United Kingdom at the time of the 1909 convention. Initials stand for Irish Saorstát Éireann.
Italy	I	
Jersey	GBJ	
Latvia	LV	
Liechtenstein	FL	For Fürstentum Liechtenstein
Lithuania	LT	
Luxembourg	L	
Malta	GBY	
Mexico	MEX	
Monaco	MC	
Morocco	F	
Netherlands	NL	
Panama	PY	Current code is PA
Paraguay	PA	Current code is PY
Peru	PE	
Persia	PR	
Poland	PL	
Portugal	P	
Romania	R	
Territory of the Saar	SA	League of Nations mandate
Kingdom of Serbs, Croats and Slovenes	SHS	
Siam	SM	
Spain	E	For España
Sweden	S	
Switzerland	CH	
Syria and Lebanon	LSA	French League of Nations mandate
Turkey	TR	
Union of Soviet Socialist Republics	SU	Russia had been a party to the 1909 convention.
United States of America	US	
Uruguay	U	Current code is ROU

== Location ==
Since the Vienna Convention on Road Traffic entered into force on 21 May 1977, in signatory countries it replaces previous road traffic conventions, including the Geneva Convention on Road Traffic, in accordance with its Article 48. According to the Vienna Convention on Road Traffic, the distinguishing sign of the country of registration must be displayed on the rear of the vehicle. The sign may either be placed separately from the registration plate as a white oval plate or sticker, or be incorporated in the vehicle registration plate. When the distinguishing sign is incorporated in the registration plate, it must also appear on the front registration plate of the vehicle.

The requirement to display a separate distinguishing sign is not necessary within the European Economic Area, for vehicles with license plates in the common EU format, which satisfy the requirements of the Vienna Convention, and so are also valid in non-EU countries signatory to that convention. Separate signs are also not needed for Canada, Mexico and the United States, where the province, state or district of registration is usually embossed or surface-printed on the vehicle registration plate, though neither of these countries are parties to the Vienna Convention.

== Current codes ==
Code	Country	From	Previous code(s)	Notes
A	Austria	1911		Austria in English or Autriche in French
AFG	Afghanistan	1971		Coincides with ISO 3166-1 alpha-3 code.
AL	Albania	1934		Coincides with ISO 3166-1 alpha-2 code.
AM	Armenia	1992	SU	Formerly part of the Soviet Union. Coincides with ISO 3166-1 alpha-2 code.
AND	Andorra	1957		Coincides with ISO 3166-1 alpha-3 code. Used on plates since 2011, name fully spelt out since 1958.
AUS	Australia	1954		Coincides with ISO 3166-1 alpha-3 code.
AX	Åland	2025	FIN	Formerly FIN and SF like the rest of Finland. Coincides with ISO 3166-1 alpha-2 code.
AXA	Anguilla	1997	GB	
AZ	Azerbaijan	1993	SU	Formerly part of the Soviet Union. Coincides with ISO 3166-1 alpha-2 code.
B	Belgium	1910		
BD	Bangladesh	1978	PAK	Formerly East Pakistan
BDS	Barbados	1956		
BF	Burkina Faso	1990	RHV / HV	Until August 2003, 1984; (République de) Haute Volta (Upper Volta)
BG	Bulgaria	1910	BUL	Coincides with ISO 3166-1 alpha-2 code.
BH	Belize	1938		Formerly British Honduras. Still officially registered as BH as of June 2024. New driving licenses appear to have 'BZ' instead of 'BH' as Belize's code. Belize License Plates have always displayed full name of the country since name change in 1973.
BIH	Bosnia and Herzegovina	1992	SHS 1919–29; Y 1929–53; YU 1953–92	Bosna i Hercegovina / Босна и Херцеговина (Bosnian). Formerly part of the Kingdom of Serbs, Croats and Slovenes Kraljevina Srba, Hrvata i Slovenaca (Serbo-Croatian), then part of Yugoslavia. Coincides with ISO 3166-1 alpha-3 code. May appear stylized as BiH.
BOL	Bolivia	1967		Coincides with ISO 3166-1 alpha-3 code.
BR	Brazil	1930		Coincides with ISO 3166-1 alpha-2 code. Displayed on license plates since 2018 alongside full name.
BRN	Bahrain	1954		
BRU	Brunei	1956		
BS	Bahamas	1950		Fully name displayed since the 1970s
BVI	British Virgin Islands	1910		
BW	Botswana	2003	BP	Officially used by Botswana since 2003. Coincides with ISO 3166-1 alpha-2 code. Formerly RB (Republic of Botswana) until 2004; Bechuanaland Protectorate before 1966.
BY	Belarus	1992 (2004)	SU	Belarus; formerly part of the Soviet Union. The UN was officially notified of the change from SU to BY only in 2004. Coincides with ISO 3166-1 alpha-2 code.
CAM	Cameroon	1952	F & WAN	Formerly a territory of France, plus a strip of territory from eastern Nigeria (WAN). Unofficially using CMR on their plates.
CDN	Canada	1956	CA	CDN for "Canada Dominion"
CGO	Democratic Republic of the Congo	1997	CB, RCL, ZRE	French: Congo Belge, République de Congo Léopoldville, Congo (Kinshasa), Zaïre, République Démocratique du Congo (French)
CH	Switzerland	1911		Confoederatio Helvetica (Latin). Coincides with ISO 3166-1 alpha-2 code.
CI	Ivory Coast (Côte d'Ivoire)	1961	F	Formerly a territory of France. Coincides with ISO 3166-1 alpha-2 code.
CL	Sri Lanka	1961		Formerly Ceylon. However, "SL" is being used on current driver licenses.
CO	Colombia	1952		Coincides with ISO 3166-1 alpha-2 code.
CR	Costa Rica	1956		Coincides with ISO 3166-1 alpha-2 code.
CU	Cuba	1930		Coincides with ISO 3166-1 alpha-2 code.
CY	Cyprus	1932		Coincides with ISO 3166-1 alpha-2 code.
CZ	Czech Republic	1993	CS	Formerly Československo (Czechoslovakia). Coincides with ISO 3166-1 alpha-2 code.
D	Germany	1910		Deutschland (German); also used until 1974 by East Germany, which then used DDR until German reunification in 1990
DK	Denmark	1914		Coincides with ISO 3166-1 alpha-2 code.
DOM	Dominican Republic	1952		Coincides with ISO 3166-1 alpha-3 code.
DY	Benin	1910	Part of AOF (Afrique occidentale française) − 1960	Dahomey (name until 1975). Uses RB unofficially (République du Bénin)
DZ	Algeria	1962	F − 1911	Djazayer (Algerian Arabic: جزائر); formerly part of France. Coincides with ISO 3166-1 alpha-2 code.
E	Spain	1910		España (Spanish)
EAK	Kenya	1938		East Africa Kenya
EAT	Tanzania	1938	EAT & EAZ	East Africa Tanzania; formerly East Africa Tanganyika and East Africa Zanzibar, EAZ used on plates issued in Zanzibar since 2008.
EAU	Uganda	1938		East Africa Uganda
EAZ	Zanzibar	1964		East Africa Zanzibar
EC	Ecuador	1962	EQ	Coincides with ISO 3166-1 alpha-2 code.
EG	Egypt	2024	ET 1927–2024	Coincides with ISO 3166-1 alpha-2 code.
ER	Eritrea	1993	AOI	Africa Orientale Italiana (Italian). Coincides with ISO 3166-1 alpha-2 code.
ES	El Salvador	1978		
EST	Estonia	1993	EW 1919–1940 & 1991–1993; SU 1940–1991	Eesti Vabariik (Estonian; old style Eesti Wabariik). Coincides with ISO 3166-1 alpha-3 code.
ETH	Ethiopia	1964	AOI − 1941	Africa Orientale Italiana (Italian). Coincides with ISO 3166-1 alpha-3 code.
F	France	1910		
FIN	Finland	1993	SF	Suomi / Finland (Finnish/Swedish). Coincides with ISO 3166-1 alpha-3 code.
FJI	Fiji	1971		Coincides with ISO 3166-1 alpha-3 code.
FL	Liechtenstein	1923		Fürstentum Liechtenstein (German: 'Principality of Liechtenstein')
FO	Faroe Islands	1996	FR	Føroyar. Coincides with ISO 3166-1 alpha-2 code.
G	Gabon	1974	ALEF − 1960	Afrique Équatoriale Française. Unofficially using RG on their license plates.
GBA	Alderney	1924	GB 1923–1924	(United Kingdom of) Great Britain & Northern Ireland – Alderney
GBG	Guernsey	1924	GB 1914–1924	(United Kingdom of) Great Britain & Northern Ireland – Guernsey
GBJ	Jersey	1924	GB 1914–1924	(United Kingdom of) Great Britain & Northern Ireland – Jersey
GBM	Isle of Man	1932		(United Kingdom of) Great Britain & Northern Ireland – Isle of Man
GBZ	Gibraltar	1924	GB 1911–1924	(United Kingdom of) Great Britain & Northern Ireland – Gibraltar (Z was assigned because G was already used for Guernsey)
GCA	Guatemala	1956	G	Guatemala, CentroAmérica in Spanish / Guatemala, Central America
GE	Georgia	1992	SU	Formerly part of the Soviet Union. Older license plates use "GEO" instead of "GE". Also used unofficially and illegally by Equatorial-Guinea (Spanish: Guinea Ecuatorial). Coincides with ISO 3166-1 alpha-2 code.
GH	Ghana	1959	WAC − 1957	West Africa Gold Coast − 1957. Coincides with ISO 3166-1 alpha-2 code.
GR	Greece	1913		Coincides with ISO 3166-1 alpha-2 code.
GUY	Guyana	1972	BRG	Formerly British Guiana − 1966. Coincides with ISO 3166-1 alpha-3 code.
H	Hungary	1910		
HK	Hong Kong	1961		Hong Kong remains in the United Nations list of country road codes. Reattached to the People's Republic of China in 1997 with a strong autonomy.
HKJ	Jordan	1966	JOR	Hashemite Kingdom of Jordan
HN	Honduras	2018		Unofficial: no other code found for Honduras. Coincides with ISO 3166-1 alpha-2 code. Full name used on license plates.
HR	Croatia	1992	SHS 1919–29; Y 1929–53; YU 1953–92	Hrvatska (Croatian). Formerly part of Yugoslavia. Immediately after Croatia's declaration of independence in 1991, it was common to see unofficial oval stickers with the letters "CRO". Despite the initial anticipation that Croatia's international vehicle registration code would be "CRO", Croatia opted for "HR" (Hrvatska) instead. SHS was for the Kingdom of the Serbs, Croats and Slovenes (Kraljevina Srba, Hrvata i Slovenaca). Coincides with ISO 3166-1 alpha-2 code.
I	Italy	1910		
IL	Israel	1952		"Israel" is also written on the plate in Hebrew (ישראל) and Arabic (إسرائيل). Coincides with ISO 3166-1 alpha-2 code.
IND	India	1947	BI	Coincides with ISO 3166-1 alpha-3 code, displayed on plates since 2005.
IR	Iran	1936	PR	Coincides with ISO 3166-1 alpha-2 code.
IRL	Ireland	1992	GB − 1910–24; SE − 1924–38; EIR − 1938–62; EIR/IRL − 1962–92	Formerly a part of the United Kingdom, Saorstát Éireann, Éire. Coincides with ISO 3166-1 alpha-3 code.
IRQ	Iraq	1930		Coincides with ISO 3166-1 alpha-3 code. Name fully spelt out on plates from 2008-2024
IRQ KR	Kurdistan	1991		See above for 'IRQ'.
IS	Iceland	1936		Ísland (Icelandic). Coincides with ISO 3166-1 alpha-2 code.
J	Japan	1964		
JA	Jamaica	1932		
KG	Kyrgyzstan	1992	SU − 1991	Formerly part of the Soviet Union. The Kyrgyz government notified the change from "KS" to "KG", which featured on the new car registration plates from March 2016, in August that year to the UN Secretary-General. Additionally, most vehicles use "KGZ" oval stickers instead of "KS". Coincides with ISO 3166-1 alpha-2 code.
KH	Cambodia	1956 (KHM)	K	Known as Kampuchea 1976–89. Formerly a territory of France. KH currently being used (Khmer) on driving licenses, which coincides with ISO 3166-1 alpha-2 code. Change ratified from K (previously KHM) to KH in 2009 to the United Nations.
KSA	Saudi Arabia	1973	SA	Kingdom of Saudi Arabia, SA used on plates from 1972 to 1981
KWT	Kuwait	1954		Full name used on plates since 1995, KWT used on plates in 1991-1994 and plates for international travel starting in 1970s, KT used in 1950s to the late 60s
KZ	Kazakhstan	1992	SU − 1991	Formerly part of the Soviet Union. Coincides with ISO 3166-1 alpha-2 code.
L	Luxembourg	1911		
LAO	Laos	1959	F – 1949	Formerly a territory of France (French Indochina). Coincides with ISO 3166-1 alpha-3 code.
LAR	Libya	1972	I − 1949, LT	Libyan Arab Republic, unused, unofficial LY used instead.
LB	Liberia	1967		Displayed on plates since 2015, full name used on license plates since 1940s.
LS	Lesotho	1967	BL	Basutoland − 1966. Coincides with ISO 3166-1 alpha-2 code.
LT	Lithuania	1992	SU 1940–1991	Coincides with ISO 3166-1 alpha-2 code.
LV	Latvia	1992	LR 1927–1940; SU 1940–1991	Latvijas Republika (Latvian). Coincides with ISO 3166-1 alpha-2 code.
M	Malta	1966	GBY 1924–66	
MA	Morocco	1924	F, E	Maroc (French). Coincides with ISO 3166-1 alpha-2 code. E used in Tangier until 1956, Cape Judy and Ifni until 1958, and Western Sahara until 1975.
MAL	Malaysia	1967	PRK – 1957; FM 1954–57; PTM 1957–67	Formerly Perak, then Federated Malay States, then Persekutuan Tanah Melayu (Malay)
MC	Monaco	1910		Coincides with ISO 3166-1 alpha-2 code. Name fully spelt out since 1950, displayed on plates since 2011.
MD	Moldova	1992	SU − 1991	Formerly part of the Soviet Union. Coincides with ISO 3166-1 alpha-2 code.
MEX	Mexico	1952		Coincides with ISO 3166-1 alpha-3 code. Displayed on all Mexican plates from 1966 until 2001
MNE	Montenegro	2006	MN 1913–1919; SHS 1919–29; Y 1929–53; YU 1953–2003; SCG 2003–2006	Independent nation until 1918. After that, part of the Kingdom of Serbs, Croats and Slovenes (Kraljevina Srba, Hrvata i Slovenaca – Serbo-Croatian), then part of Yugoslavia and then Serbia and Montenegro (Srbija i Crna Gora – Serbian). Independence restored in 2006. Coincides with ISO 3166-1 alpha-3 code.
MGL	Mongolia	2002		MNG displayed on current plates. Nevertheless, the new format includes MGL once again. Coincides with ISO 3166-1 alpha-3 code.
MOC	Mozambique	1975	MOC: 1932–56; P: 1957–75	Formerly part of Portugal. Moçambique (Portuguese). Coincides with ISO 3166-1 alpha-3 code.
MS	Mauritius	1938		
MV	Maldives	1965		Coincides with ISO 3166-1 alpha-2 code.
MW	Malawi	1965	EA 1932–38; NP – 1938–70; RNY option 1960–65	Formerly the Nyasaland Protectorate. Coincides with ISO 3166-1 alpha-2 code.
MYA	Myanmar	2019	BA, BUR	Previously known as Burma. Coincides with the former ISO 3166-1 alpha-2 code.
N	Norway	1922		
NAM	Namibia	1990	SWA	Formerly South West Africa. Coincides with ISO 3166-1 alpha-3 code.
NAU	Nauru	1968		
NEP	Nepal	1970		
NIC	Nicaragua	1952		Coincides with ISO 3166-1 alpha-3 code.
NL	Netherlands	1910		Coincides with ISO 3166-1 alpha-2 code.
NMK	North Macedonia	2019	YU − 1992; MK 1992–2019	Formerly part of Yugoslavia. Known as Republic of Macedonia until 2019. Mix of English North and Macedonian Makedonija.
NZ	New Zealand	1958		Coincides with ISO 3166-1 alpha-2 code.
OM	Oman	?		Coincides with ISO 3166-1 alpha-2 code.
P	Portugal	1910		Unofficially used for Palestine in the West Bank and Gaza Strip.
PA	Panama	1952	PY 1924–1952	Coincides with ISO 3166-1 alpha-2 code. RP used 1928—-1936 for República de Panamá, name fully spelt out since 1937.
PE	Peru	1937		Coincides with ISO 3166-1 alpha-2 code. Used on plates 1958—2009, name fully spelt out since 2010.
PK	Pakistan	1947		Coincides with ISO 3166-1 alpha-2 code.
PL	Poland	1921		Coincides with ISO 3166-1 alpha-2 code.
PNG	Papua New Guinea	1978		Coincides with ISO 3166-1 alpha-3 code. Used on plates since 1971.
PY	Paraguay	1952	PA 1924–1952	Coincides with ISO 3166-1 alpha-2 code. Name fully spelt out since 1972.
Q	Qatar	1972		
RA	Argentina	1927		República Argentina (Spanish)
RC	Taiwan	1932		Republic of China. Unofficially also used by car license plates in the Republic of Congo "République du Congo".
RCA	Central African Republic	1962		République Centrafricaine (French)
RCB	Republic of the Congo	1962		République du Congo Brazzaville (French). Unofficially using RC on current plates.
RCH	Chile	1930		República de Chile (Spanish)
RG	Guinea	1972		République de Guinée (French). Also used unofficially by Gabon.
RH	Haiti	1952		République d'Haïti (French)
RI	Indonesia	1955		Republik Indonesia (Indonesian)
RIM	Mauritania	1964		République islamique de Mauritanie (French)
RKS	Kosovo	2010	SHS 1919–29; Y 1929–53; YU 1953–2003; SCG 2003–2006; SRB 2006–2010	Republic of Kosovo
RL	Lebanon	1952		République Libanaise (French)
RM	Madagascar	1962		République de Madagascar (French)
RMM	Mali	1962	AOF − 1960	République du Mali (French). Formerly part of French West Africa (Afrique Occidentale Française)
RN	Niger	1977	AOF − 1960; 1960-1977 - NIG (?)	République du Niger (French). Formerly part of French West Africa (Afrique Occidentale Française). Still listed as NIG under the UN list.
RO	Romania	1981	R - 1981	Coincides with ISO 3166-1 alpha-2 code.
ROK	Republic of Korea	1971		Republic of Korea. KOR used on European size plates since 2019.
ROU	Uruguay	1981	U 1926–1981	Stands for República Oriental del Uruguay.
RP	Philippines	1975		Republika ng Pilipinas (Republic of the Philippines)
RSM	San Marino	1932		Repubblica di San Marino (Italian)
RU	Burundi	1960		Belgian territory of Ruanda-Urundi. Unofficially using BU on their plates.
RUS	Russia	1992		Formerly part of the Soviet Union. Coincides with ISO 3166-1 alpha-3 code.
RWA	Rwanda	1964	RU − 1962	Formerly part of Ruanda-Urundi − 1962. Coincides with ISO 3166-1 alpha-3 code.
S	Sweden	1911		
SD	Eswatini	1935		Formerly Swaziland
SGP	Singapore	1952		Coincides with ISO 3166-1 alpha-3 code.
SK	Slovakia	1993	CS 1919–39,1945–92; SQ 1939–45	Formerly Československo (Czechoslovakia). Coincides with ISO 3166-1 alpha-2 code.
SLO	Slovenia	1992	SHS 1919–29; Y 1929–53; YU 1953–92	Formerly part of the Kingdom of Serbs, Croats and Slovenes Kraljevina Srba, Hrvata i Slovenaca (Serbo-Croatian), then part of Yugoslavia.
SME	Suriname	1936		Now displaying 'SUR' on current driving licenses.
SN	Senegal	1962		Coincides with ISO 3166-1 alpha-2 code.
SO	Somalia	1974	SP	Formerly Somaliland Protectorate. Coincides with ISO 3166-1 alpha-2 code.
SRB	Serbia	2006	SB – 1919; SHS 1919–29; Y 1929–53; YU 1953–2003; SCG 2003–2006	Formerly part of Kingdom of Serbia (Kraljevina Srbija – Serbian), Kingdom of Serbs, Croats and Slovenes (Kraljevina Srba, Hrvata i Slovenaca – Serbo-Croatian), Yugoslavia (Jugoslavija – Serbo-Croatian), and Serbia and Montenegro (Srbija i Crna Gora – Serbian). Coincides with ISO 3166-1 alpha-3 code.
SUD	Sudan	1963		
SY	Seychelles	1938		
SYR	Syria	1952		Coincides with ISO 3166-1 alpha-3 code.
T	Thailand	1955	SM	Siam
TCH	Chad	1973		Tchad (French)
TG	Togo	1973	RT	Formerly République Togolaise (French). Coincides with ISO 3166-1 alpha-2 code.
TJ	Tajikistan	1992	SU − 1991	Formerly part of the Soviet Union, used code "PT" for Республика Таджикистан on plates from 1993 to 2003. Coincides with ISO 3166-1 alpha-2 code.
TM	Turkmenistan	1992	SU − 1991	Formerly part of the Soviet Union. Coincides with ISO 3166-1 alpha-2 code.
TN	Tunisia	1957	F − 1956	Formerly a territory of France. Coincides with ISO 3166-1 alpha-2 code. Standard plates display تونس (Tunisia) which must be replaced with TU when traveling internationally.
TO	Tonga	1995		Coincides with ISO 3166-1 alpha-2 code. Full name displayed on all plates since 1990s.
TR	Turkey	1923		Coincides with ISO 3166-1 alpha-2 code.
TT	Trinidad and Tobago	1964		Coincides with ISO 3166-1 alpha-2 code.
UA	Ukraine	1992	SU	Formerly part of the Soviet Union. Coincides with ISO 3166-1 alpha-2 code.
UAE	United Arab Emirates	1971		Currently used on plates issued in Fujairah and Sharjah
UK	United Kingdom	2021	GB (1910–2021)	Before 1922, United Kingdom of Great Britain and Ireland. Until 2021, "GB" was used, but from 28 September 2021 the United Kingdom of Great Britain and Northern Ireland changed its international vehicle registration code from "GB" to "UK". (This does not affect territories for which the United Kingdom controls international relations outside Great Britain and Northern Ireland.)
USA	United States	1952	US	Coincides with ISO 3166-1 alpha-3 code, used on registration plates for US Forces in Germany from 1962 until 2020, US now used by US Forces Germany since 2020. 'U' is currently used for registration plates for US Forces in Portugal (Lajes, Azores). Currently displayed on all plates issued in New Mexico (1969—1975, 1988—Present) Guam (1965—Present), and Northern Mariana Islands (1989—Present).
UZ	Uzbekistan	1992	SU	Formerly part of the Soviet Union. Coincides with ISO 3166-1 alpha-2 code.
V	Vatican City	1931		CV (Italian: Città del Vaticano) is used as a prefix on the license plate number itself. The prefix used on official and government vehicles is SCV (Latin: Status Civitatis Vaticanae)
VN	Vietnam	1953		Coincides with ISO 3166-1 alpha-2 code.
WAG	Gambia	1932		West Africa Gambia, GPF used on plates since 2019 standing for Gambia Police Force which is the issuing authority.
WAL	Sierra Leone	1937		West Africa Sierra Leone; on local license plates SLE is used
WAN	Nigeria	1937		West Africa Nigeria, name fully spelt out since 1992.
WD	Dominica	1954		Windward Islands Dominica
WG	Grenada	1932		Windward Islands Grenada
WL	Saint Lucia	1932		Windward Islands Saint Lucia
WS	Samoa	1962		Formerly Western Samoa. Coincides with ISO 3166-1 alpha-2 code.
WV	Saint Vincent and the Grenadines	1932		Windward Islands Saint Vincent
YAR	Yemen	1960		North Yemen formerly known as the Yemen Arab Republic.
YV	Venezuela	1955		Name fully spelt out on plates since 1955. Coincides with the allocated aircraft prefix.
Z	Zambia	1964	RNR	Formerly Northern Rhodesia. ZM set out in national legislation since 2002 and mandatory on plates for new registrations starting 2017. Name fully spelt out on plates since 2002.
ZA	South Africa	1936		Zuid-Afrika (from Dutch; in Afrikaans it is Suid-Afrika). Coincides with ISO 3166-1 alpha-2 code.
ZW	Zimbabwe	1980	SR, RSR	Formerly Southern Rhodesia until 1965, Rhodesia unrecognised until 1980. Coincides with ISO 3166-1 alpha-2 code. Name fully spelt out on plates since 2006.

== Codes no longer in use ==
Code	Country	Used until	Replaced by	Notes
ADN	(Aden Colony) Aden	1990	Y	From 1938, also known as South Yemen, People's Democratic Republic of Yemen (1967)
BA	(Myanmar) Burma	1956	BUR	From 1937
BUR	Myanmar	2019	MYA	Change notified in 1982 and ratified in 2019.
BP	Bechuanaland Protectorate	1966	BW	Now Botswana
CA	Canada	1956	CDN	
CB	Belgian Congo	1963	CGO	Congo belge. Code used from 1952.
CS	Czechoslovakia	1992	CZ, SK	Split into Czech Republic and Slovakia. Coincided with ISO 3166-1 alpha-2 code.
DA	Danzig, Free City of	1939	D (1939–1945); PL (since 1945)	Danzig (German for Gdańsk)
DDR	(East Germany) German Democratic Republic	1990	D	From 1974 (used D until 1974), Deutsche Demokratische Republik. Coincided with ISO 3166-1 alpha-3 code.
EIR	(Republic of Ireland) Éire	1992	IRL	Now Ireland
ET	Egypt	2024	EG	Ratified to the United Nations in 2024.
EW	Estonia	1993	EST	Eesti Wabariik (Estonian in Interwar-era spelling, which used W instead of V; the modern spelling is Eesti Vabariik)
FR	Faroe Islands	1996	FO	Føroyar (Faroese) or Færøerne (Danish)
GB	United Kingdom	2021	UK	Changed to UK to be inclusive of Northern Ireland (which is not part of Great Britain), though the previous GB did also apply to Northern Ireland. Coincided with ISO 3166-1 alpha-2 code.
GBY	Malta	1966	M	Changed after independence from UK
GRO	Greenland	1910	KN	Grønland (Danish language) / Kalaallit Nunaat (Greenlandic language). Unofficial. The official code is DK.
HV	(Republic of Upper Volta) Upper Volta (French: Haute-Volta), now Burkina Faso	1984	BF	Upper Volta. Coincided with ISO 3166-1 alpha-2 code.
K	Cambodia	2009	KH	Ratified by the United Nations as KH on 18 November 2009.
KS	Kyrgyzstan	1992–2016	KG	Ratified by the United Nations as KG in March 2016.
LR	Latvia	1927–1940	SU, LV	Latvijas Republika (Latvian)
MK	(North Macedonia) Republic of Macedonia	1992–2019	NMK	Became North Macedonia in 2019. Coincided with ISO 3166-1 alpha-2 code.
NA	Netherlands Antilles	1957		The Netherlands Antilles were dissolved in 2010.
NIG	Niger	Unknown	RN	Still listed as NIG under the UN list.
PANG	(Portugal) Portuguese Angola	1956	P (1957–1975)	From 1932. Formerly part of Portugal
PI	Philippines	1973?	RP	Still listed as PI under the UN list.
R	Romania	1981	RO	
RNY	Federation of Rhodesia and Nyasaland	1953–1963	NP, NR, SR	Now Malawi, Zambia and Zimbabwe
RNR	Zambia	Unknown	Z? ZM?	Formerly Rhodesia, although still listed as RNR under the UN list (as of May 2024).
RSR	Southern Rhodesia	1965–1979	SR	Now Zimbabwe
RT	Togo	1973	TG	République togolaise (French). Formerly French Togoland − 1960
SA	Territory of the Saar Basin	1926–1935	D	League of Nations mandate, returned to Germany in 1935
SA	Saar Protectorate	1947–1956	D	French Protectorate, now Saarland, Germany
SA	Saudi Arabia	Unknown	KSA	The date of the change is unknown. Coincided with ISO 3166-1 alpha-2 code.
SB	(Kingdom of Serbia) Serbia	1919	SHS	Serbia became part of the Kingdom of Serbs, Croats and Slovenes
SCG	Serbia and Montenegro	2006	MNE, SRB	From Serbian name "Srbija i Crna Gora". Split into Montenegro and Serbia. Coincided with ISO 3166-1 alpha-3 code.
SE	(Republic of Ireland) Saorstát Éireann	1938	EIR (IRL from 1962)	Under GB until 1924. Name changed to Éire, now Ireland
SF	Finland	1993	FIN	SF from "Suomi – Finland" (the names of the country in its official languages, Finnish and Swedish)
SHS	(Kingdom of Yugoslavia) Kingdom of Serbs, Croats and Slovenes	1929	Y	Kraljevina Srba, Hrvata i Slovenaca – Serbo-Croatian. The Kingdom changed its name to Yugoslavia
SP	Somaliland	1960	SO	Initialism of Somaliland Protectorate.
SU	Soviet Union	1991	EW, LT, LV, BY, MD, UA, TJ, TM, GE, KZ, UZ, KS, AZ, AM, RUS	Coincided with ISO 3166-1 alpha-2 code.
SWA	South West Africa	1990		Now Namibia
TS	Free Territory of Trieste	1947–1954		Territory Zone A (controlled by the United Kingdom and United States from 1947 to 1954 before given to Italy). Now in Italy, Croatia and Slovenia.
Y	(Socialist Federal Republic of Yugoslavia) Yugoslavia	1953	YU	
YU	(Socialist Federal Republic of Yugoslavia) / (Federal Republic of Yugoslavia) Yugoslavia	1992	BIH, HR, NMK, MNE, RKS, SRB, SLO	Now Bosnia and Herzegovina, Croatia, North Macedonia, Montenegro, Kosovo, Serbia, and Slovenia. MK for Macedonia was in use from 1993 until 2019. Coincided with ISO 3166-1 alpha-2 code.
ZRE	Zaire	1997	CGO	Now the Democratic Republic of the Congo. Coincided with ISO 3166-1 alpha-3 code.

== Unofficial codes ==
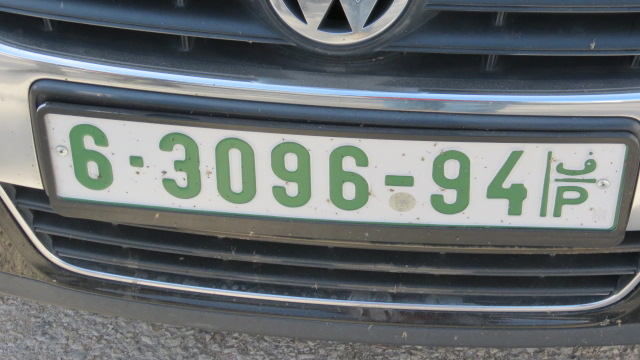
Car with Palestinian license plate, bearing Latin letter "P" and Arabic letter Fāʼ.

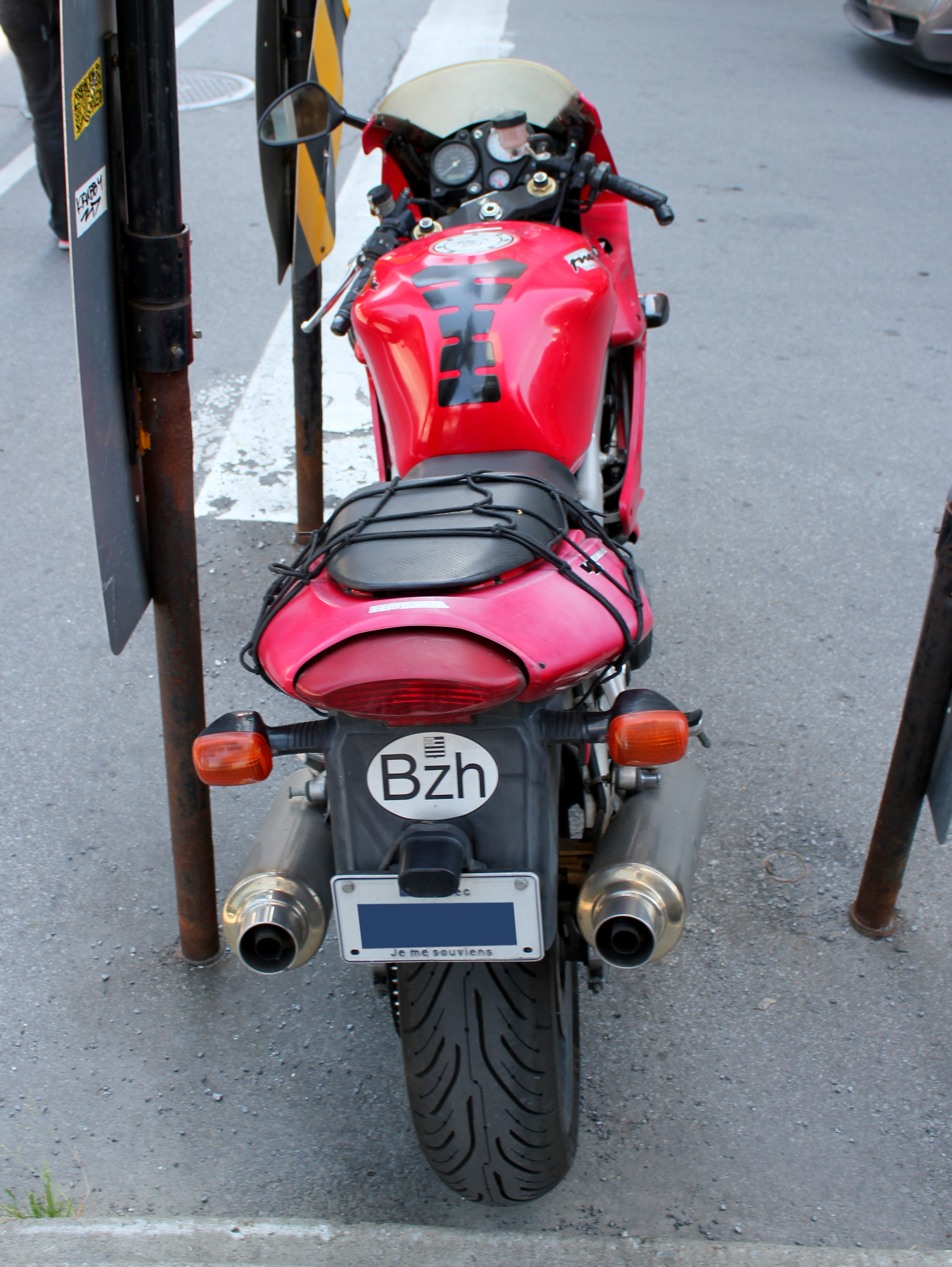
The unofficial code for Brittany, Bzh

There are unofficial codes in common use, such as:

- AS for Asturias,
- BZH for Brittany (Breton Breizh),
- CAT for Catalonia or Catalan Countries,
- CSB for Kashubia (Cassubia),
- CSC for Corsica,
- CYM for Wales (Welsh Cymru),
- CW for Curaçao
- EH for Basque Country (Basque Euskal Herria),
- ENG for England,
- FRL for Frisia o Friesland,
- GRD for Groland (a fictional/satirical 'presipality'),
- KAN for Saint Kitts and Nevis,
- NB for North Brabant,
- OC for Occitania,
- P for Palestine, in conjunction with the Arabic Letter ف (Fa)
- PR for Puerto Rico,
- SCO for Scotland,
- SIC for Székely Land (Latin Terra Siculorum),
- TS for Transylvania,
- VL for Flanders (Dutch Vlaanderen).

Some of these, such as VL which is used by Flemish separatists, are used despite being specifically illegal under local laws.

In addition, in some areas, vehicle-style stickers have been used to denote and promote other entities, such as towns, islands, businesses, and even associations. These irregular stickers almost always bear an explanation of the code in small print near the edge of the sticker, as the codes used may be unfamiliar.

== Diplomatic license plate codes ==
A separate system is used for vehicles belonging to the diplomats of foreign countries with license plates from the host country. That system is host country-specific and varies largely from country to country. For example, TR on a diplomatic car in the USA indicates Italy, not Turkey. Such markings in other countries (e.g. Norway) are indicated with numbers only, again different from international standards (e.g. 90 is the code for Slovakia on Norwegian diplomatic license plates). In the Australian capital Canberra diplomatic car plates are D.C. followed by a number indicating the country and then digits in descending order, for example the head of mission’s vehicle is 01, the deputy is 02. For overseas staff of diplomatic missions who are not diplomats, the prefix is D.X.

== See also ==
- Aircraft registration
- International Driving Permit
- ISO 3166
- Vienna Convention on Road Traffic
- Vehicle identification number
