= Ak =

Ak may refer to:

== People ==
- Aytaç Ak, Turkish footballer
- DJ Akademiks, American Twitch streamer
- Orhan Ak, Turkish footballer

== Places ==
- Ak, Buin Zahra, a village in Buin Zahra County, Qazvin Province, Iran
- Ak, Qazvin, a village in Qazvin County, Qazvin Province, Iran
- Ak, Takestan, a village in Takestan County, Qazvin Province, Iran
- Ak Rural District, in Takestan County, Qazvin Province, Iran
- Ak, Turkmenistan, a town in Magtymguly District, Balkan Province, Turkmenistan

== Other uses ==
- Ak language, a Sepik language spoken in Papua New Guinea
- Ak, the Master Woodsman of the World in L. Frank Baum's The Life and Adventures of Santa Claus
- Ak, the nickname for bassist Steve Jay, of the ethno-funk duo Ak & Zuie

== See also ==
- AK (disambiguation)
