= Kahak, Qazvin =

Village in Qazvin province, Iran

Kahak Persian: كهك
- Village
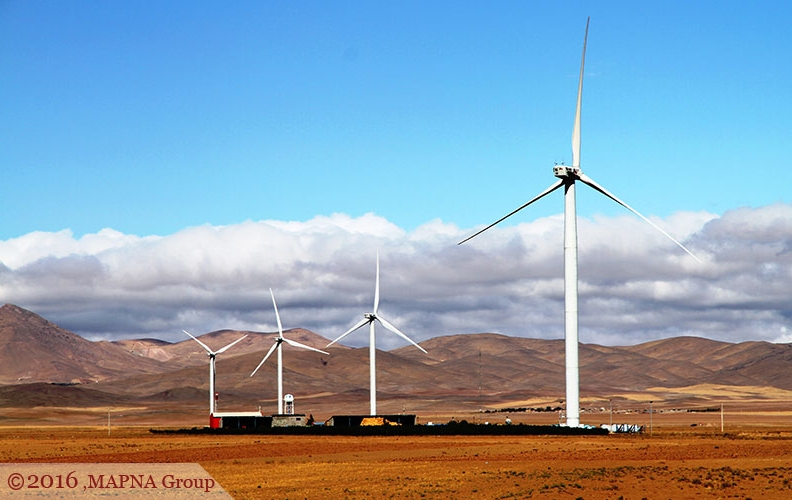

- Location within Iran
- Coordinates: 36°06′40″N 49°45′47″E
- Country: Iran
- Province: Qazvin
- County: Takestan
- District: Esfarvarin
- Rural District: Khorramabad

Population (2016)
  - Total: 2,827
- Time zone: UTC+3:30 (IRST)

Kahak (Persian: كهك) (Note: Also known as Kakhak, Kūhak, and Kūkak) is a village in Khorramabad Rural District of Esfarvarin District in Takestan County, Qazvin province, Iran.

== Demographics ==
=== Population ===
At the time of the 2006 National Census, the village's population was 1,956 in 440 households. The following census in 2011 counted 2,470 people in 683 households. The 2016 census measured the population of the village as 2,827 people in 809 households. It was the most populous village in its rural district.
