= Shorket-e Zormorgh =

Village in Qazvin province, Iran

Shorket-e Zormorgh Persian: شركت زرمرغ
- Village
- Location within Iran
- Coordinates: 36°02′01″N 49°45′32″E
- Country: Iran
- Province: Qazvin
- County: Takestan
- District: Esfarvarin
- Rural District: Khorramabad

Population (2016)
  - Total: 0
- Time zone: UTC+3:30 (IRST)

Shorket-e Zormorgh (Persian: شركت زرمرغ) is a village in Khorramabad Rural District of Esfarvarin District in Takestan County, Qazvin province, Iran.

== Demographics ==
=== Population ===
At the time of the 2006 National Census, the village's population was 69 in nine households. The village did not appear in the following census of 2011. The 2016 census measured the population of the village as zero.
