= Qarqasin =

Village in Qazvin province, Iran

Qarqasin Persian: قرقسين
- Village
- Location within Iran
- Coordinates: 35°55′52″N 49°40′22″E
- Country: Iran
- Province: Qazvin
- County: Takestan
- District: Esfarvarin
- Rural District: Ak

Population (2016)
  - Total: 1,118
- Time zone: UTC+3:30 (IRST)

Qarqasin (Persian: قرقسين) (Note: Also romanized as Qarqasīn) is a village in Ak Rural District of Esfarvarin District in Takestan County, Qazvin province, Iran.

== Demographics ==
=== Population ===
At the time of the 2006 National Census, the village's population was 1,208 in 228 households. The following census in 2011 counted 1,232 people in 342 households. The 2016 census measured the population of the village as 1,118 people in 328 households.
