= AK =

AK or A.K. may refer to:

== Arts and entertainment ==
- AK (gamer), a Filipino esports player
- A.K. (film), 1985, directed by Chris Marker
- AK (radio program), a weekly program produced by Alaska Public Radio Network from 2003 to 2008, later a segment on Alaska News Nightly
- AK (rapper), also known as AK the Razorman, American rapper from Atlanta, Georgia, member of hip hop group P$C
- AK-47 (rapper), American rapper from Chicago, Illinois, member of hip hop group Do or Die
- AK the Savior, American rapper from Brooklyn, New York, member of The Underachievers
- Arknights, the Chinese mobile game developed by Hypergryph
- Ajith Kumar, Indian actor, commonly referred to as AK
- Ananda Krishnan, Malaysian broadcast and telecommunications businessman
- Anil Kapoor, Indian actor, often referred to simply as AK
  - AK vs AK, 2020 Indian film by Vikramaditya Motwane about Kapoor
- Ayushmann Khurrana, Indian actor and singer

== Businesses and organizations ==
- AK Press, a collectively owned and operated independent publisher and book distributor that specializes in radical and anarchist literature
- AK Steel, a US-based S&P 500 (NYSE:AKS) Steel Manufacturer
- Adalet ve Kalkınma Partisi, the Turkish Justice and Development Party
- Arbeiterkammer, the Austrian Chamber of Labour
- Armia Krajowa (Home Army), underground resistance in Nazi-occupied Poland during World War II
- Ajnad al-Kavkaz, a Chechen-led militia in the Syrian Civil War

== Science ==
- Auckland War Memorial Museum (herbarium code "AK")
- Patient AK, a 16-year-old female patient who laughed when her brain was stimulated with electric current during treatment for epilepsy
- Actinic keratosis, a skin condition
- Applied kinesiology, a method using manual muscle testing that purportedly gives feedback on the functional status of the body

== Places ==
- Alaska, a state in the US whose postal abbreviation is "AK"
- Azad Kashmir, a region of Pakistan

== Transport ==
- AirAsia (IATA code AK), a Malaysia-based airline
- A US Navy hull classification symbol: Dry cargo ship (AK)
- New Zealand AK class carriage passenger carriages used by KiwiRail on their Great Railway Journeys of New Zealand
- Akola Junction railway station (Indian railways station code: AK), Maharashtra, India
- Arkadag (vehicle registration suffix AK)
- Angke railway station, a railway station in Jakarta, Indonesia

== Other uses ==
- Akan language (ISO 639-1 code alpha-2 ak)
- Kalashnikov rifle (Avtomat Kalashnikova) an originally Soviet/Russian series of rifles, e.g. AK-47, AKM, AK-74, AK-101, AK-103, etc.
  - AK-47, shortened to "AK"
- Knight of the Order of Australia, awarded from 1976 to 1986, and 2014 to 2015
- Aktuaalne kaamera, a TV program of the Eesti Televisioon
- Armia Krajowa, the primary resistance movement in German-occupied Poland during World War II

== See also ==
- Ak (disambiguation)
