= Kharuzan =

Village in Qazvin province, Iran

Kharuzan Persian: خروزان
- Village
- Location within Iran
- Coordinates: 35°56′44″N 49°47′46″E
- Country: Iran
- Province: Qazvin
- County: Takestan
- District: Esfarvarin
- Rural District: Ak

Population (2016)
  - Total: 544
- Time zone: UTC+3:30 (IRST)

Kharuzan (Persian: خروزان) (Note: Also romanized as Kharūzān) is a village in Ak Rural District of Esfarvarin District in Takestan County, Qazvin province, Iran.

== Demographics ==
=== Population ===
At the time of the 2006 National Census, the village's population was 494 in 114 households. The following census in 2011 counted 482 people in 128 households. The 2016 census measured the population of the village as 544 people in 160 households.
