= Lushkan =

Village in Qazvin province, Iran

Lushkan Persian: لوشكان
- Village
- Location within Iran
- Coordinates: 35°54′37″N 49°42′55″E
- Country: Iran
- Province: Qazvin
- County: Takestan
- District: Esfarvarin
- Rural District: Ak

Population (2016)
  - Total: 3,028
- Time zone: UTC+3:30 (IRST)

Lushkan (Persian: لوشكان) (Note: Also romanized as Looshkan, Lowshkān, and Lūshkān; also known as Lūshgān) is a village in Ak Rural District of Esfarvarin District in Takestan County, Qazvin province, Iran.

== Demographics ==
=== Ethnicity ===
The village is populated by Azerbaijani Turks.

=== Population ===
At the time of the 2006 National Census, the village's population was 2,864 in 621 households. The following census in 2011 counted 2,672 people in 748 households. The 2016 census measured the population of the village as 3,028 people in 841 households.
