= Mahmudabad, Takestan =

Village in Qazvin province, Iran

Mahmudabad Persian: محموداباد
- Village
- Location within Iran
- Coordinates: 35°58′58″N 49°44′14″E
- Country: Iran
- Province: Qazvin
- County: Takestan
- District: Esfarvarin
- Rural District: Ak

Population (2016)
  - Total: 483
- Time zone: UTC+3:30 (IRST)

Mahmudabad (Persian: محموداباد) (Note: Also romanized as Maḩmūdābād; also known as Maḩmūdābād-e Shārīn) is a village in Ak Rural District of Esfarvarin District in Takestan County, Qazvin province, Iran.

== Demographics ==
=== Population ===
At the time of the 2006 National Census, the village's population was 453 in 112 households. The following census in 2011 counted 406 people in 112 households. The 2016 census measured the population of the village as 483 people in 136 households.
