= Nasirabad-e Sadat =

Village in Qazvin province, Iran

Nasirabad-e Sadat Persian: ناصر اباد سادات
- Village
- Country: Iran
- Province: Qazvin
- County: Takestan
- District: Esfarvarin
- Rural District: Ak

Population (2016)
  - Total: 54
- Time zone: UTC+3:30 (IRST)

Nasirabad-e Sadat (Persian: ناصر اباد سادات) (Note: Also romanized as Nāṣirābād-e Sādāt) is a village in Ak Rural District of Esfarvarin District in Takestan County, Qazvin province, Iran.

== Demographics ==
=== Population ===
At the time of the 2006 National Census, the village's population was 79 in 23 households. The following census in 2011 counted 70 people in 26 households. The 2016 census measured the population of the village as 54 people in 17 households.
