= AK 10 =

AK10, AK-10, AK 10, may refer to:

- Alaska Route 10 (AK 10), Alaska, US, a state highway
- USS Quincy (AK-10), a WWI U.S. Navy cargoship
- Moriguchi Station (Nagano) (station code AK-10), Matsumoto, Nagano, Japan, a train station

== See also ==
- AK (disambiguation)
- AKX (disambiguation)
- Akio
- Aklo
