= Dialabad =

Village in Qazvin province, Iran

Dialabad Persian: ديال اباد
- Village
- Location within Iran
- Coordinates: 36°04′42″N 49°47′18″E
- Country: Iran
- Province: Qazvin
- County: Takestan
- District: Esfarvarin
- Rural District: Khorramabad

Population (2016)
  - Total: 2,351
- Time zone: UTC+3:30 (IRST)

Dialabad (Persian: ديال اباد) (Note: Also romanized as Deyālābād, Dīālābād, and Dīyālābād; also known as Dayal Abad) is a village in Khorramabad Rural District of Esfarvarin District in Takestan County, Qazvin province, Iran.

== Demographics ==
=== Population ===
At the time of the 2006 National Census, the village's population was 2,460 in 625 households. The following census in 2011 counted 2,517 people in 778 households. The 2016 census measured the population of the village as 2,351 people in 730 households.
