= Sharin =

Village in Qazvin province, Iran

Sharin Persian: شارين
- Village
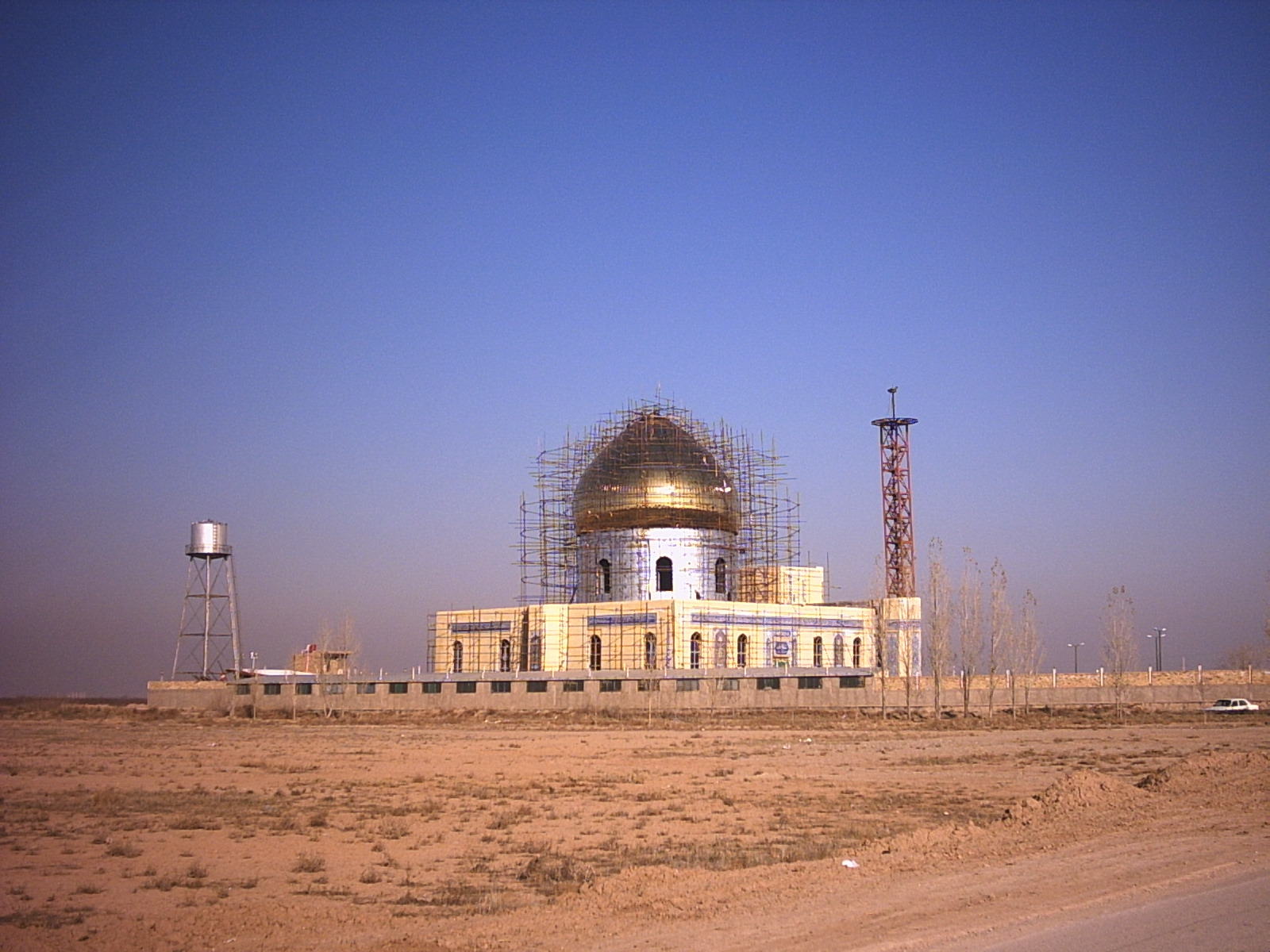
- Tomb of Seyyed Ali

- Location within Iran
- Coordinates: 35°58′50″N 49°45′07″E
- Country: Iran
- Province: Qazvin
- County: Takestan
- District: Esfarvarin
- Rural District: Ak

Population (2016)
  - Total: 251
- Time zone: UTC+3:30 (IRST)

Sharin (Persian: شارين) (Note: Also romanized as Shārīn; also known as Chārūn) is a village in Ak Rural District of Esfarvarin District in Takestan County, Qazvin province, Iran.

== Demographics ==
=== Population ===
At the time of the 2006 National Census, the village's population was 313 in 72 households. The following census in 2011 counted 236 people in 60 households. The 2016 census measured the population of the village as 251 people in 70 households.
