= Valazjerd, Qazvin =

Village in Qazvin province, Iran

Valazjerd Persian: ولازجرد
- Village
- Location within Iran
- Coordinates: 35°59′54″N 49°46′28″E
- Country: Iran
- Province: Qazvin
- County: Takestan
- District: Esfarvarin
- Rural District: Ak

Population (2016)
  - Total: 1,521
- Time zone: UTC+3:30 (IRST)

Valazjerd (Persian: ولازجرد) (Note: Also romanized as Valāzjerd and Velāzjerd; also known as Wālāzird) is a village in Ak Rural District of Esfarvarin District in Takestan County, Qazvin province, Iran.

== Demographics ==
=== Population ===
At the time of the 2006 National Census, the village's population was 1,272 in 333 households. The following census in 2011 counted 1,364 people in 423 households. The 2016 census measured the population of the village as 1,521 people in 466 households.
