= Khorramabad, Takestan =

Village in Qazvin province, Iran

Khorramabad Persian: خرم اباد
- Village
- Location within Iran
- Coordinates: 36°01′46″N 49°46′04″E
- Country: Iran
- Province: Qazvin
- County: Takestan
- District: Esfarvarin
- Rural District: Khorramabad

Population (2016)
  - Total: 1,431
- Time zone: UTC+3:30 (IRST)

Khorramabad (Persian: خرم اباد) (Note: Also romanized as Khorramābād; also known as Khurramabad) is a village in, and the capital of, Khorramabad Rural District in Esfarvarin District of Takestan County, Qazvin province, Iran.

== Demographics ==
=== Population ===
At the time of the 2006 National Census, the village's population was 1,680 in 415 households. The following census in 2011 counted 1,624 people in 486 households. The 2016 census measured the population of the village as 1,431 people in 521 households.
