= AKX (disambiguation) =

AKX often refers to Air Nippon Network (ICAO airline code AKX), a Japanese airline.

AKX may also refer to:

- Aktobe International Airport (IATA airport code AKX), Aktobe, Kazakhstan
- Aka-Kede language (ISO 639 language code akx), an extinct Great Andamanese language of Middle Andeman
- Akaflieg Karlsruhe AK-X glider

== See also ==
- AK 10 (disambiguation)
