= Vehicle registration plates of Turkmenistan =

Republic of Turkmenistan
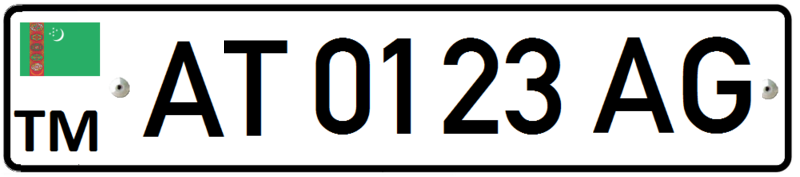
- Turkmen regular legal standard number plate.
- Country: Turkmenistan
- Country code: TM

Current series
- Size: 520 mm × 110 mm 20.5 in × 4.3 in
- Serial format: AB1234CD (CD being the regional code)
- Colour (front): Black on white
- Colour (rear): Black on white

Turkmen registration plates were first issued in 1980, when the country was still a Soviet republic. Although it had become a sovereign state in 1991, Turkmenistan continued to use Soviet plates until the introduction of the current format in 1994 – a phenomenon also observed in Kyrgyzstan.

== Previous series ==
Between 1980 and 1993, Turkmen registration plates were manufactured in accordance with the Soviet GOST 3207-77 standard. The alphanumeric sequence took the form of: x #### XX, where x is a lowercase Cyrillic serial/counter letter; # is any digit in the range 0-9; and XX are two uppercase Cyrillic letters indicating where the vehicle was first registered.

к 3361 АШ

в 2988 НТ

=== Region identifiers ===
Suffix	Region
АШ	Ashkhabad Province
МХ	Mary Province
НТ	Türkmenbaşy Province
ТЗ	Daşoguz Province
ТР	Turkmen SSR
ЧР	Chardzhou Province

== Current series ==
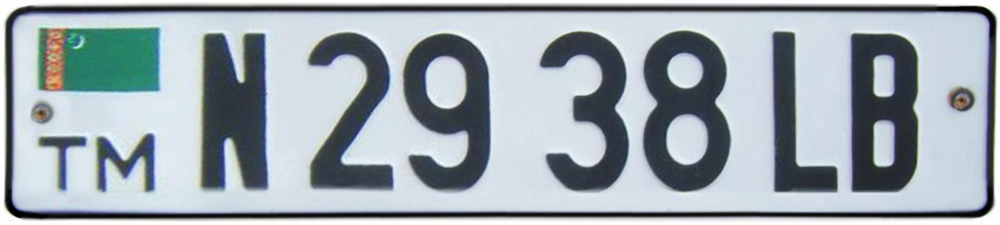
Current series Turkmen registration plate issued in Lebap

1994 saw the introduction of the current format, which is intended to comply more closely with international norms. Major changes include the switch from Cyrillic letters to Latin, and the presence of the Turkmen flag with the two-letter country code TM on the left of the plate. Unusually, the alphanumerics are rendered in a mix of DIN 1451 and the unnamed font formerly used on French registration plates.

Initially the plates took the form of X ## ## XX (where X is a Latin serial/counter letter; # is a digit in the range 0-9; and XX is a two-letter province identifier). The format was updated to XX ## ## XX in 2010.

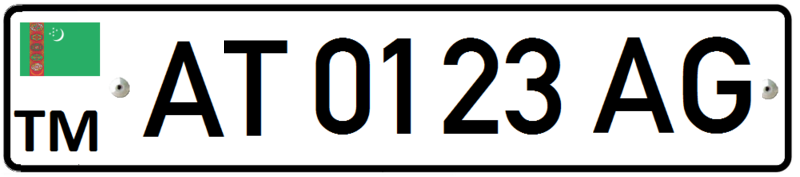

=== Trailers ===
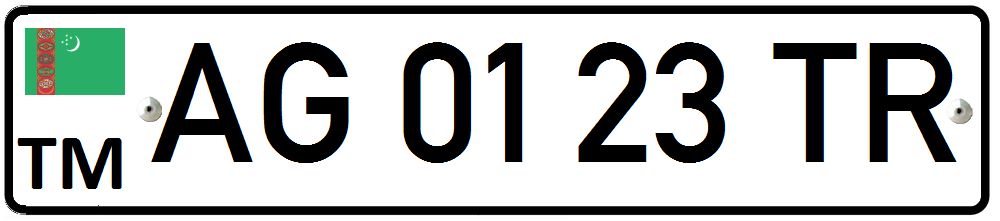

=== Province identifiers ===
Suffix	Province
AG	Ashgabat
AH	Ahal
AK	Arkadag
BN	Balkan
DZ	Daşoguz
LB	Lebap
MR	Mary

=== Special series ===
==== Diplomatic ====
Diplomatic plates are blue with white characters (rendered in DIN 1451) of the form ## CD ### – where # is any digit in the range 0–9. The first two digits indicate the embassy to whom the vehicle belongs, whilst the remaining three are serial numbers. The Turkmen flag appears to the left of the plate, above the letters 'TM'.

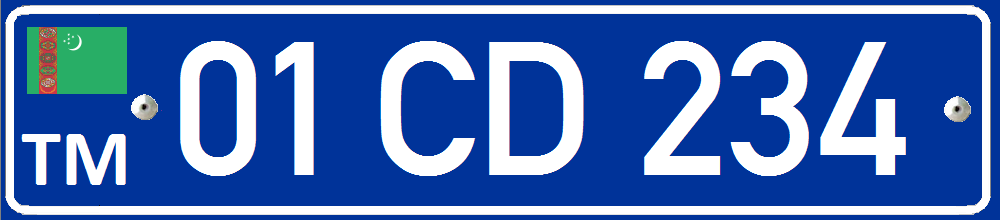

==== Foreign national ====
Plates issued to foreign nationals or companies residing in Turkmenistan resemble closely those found in Azerbaijan. They feature black alphanumerics rendered in DIN 1451 on a yellow background, and take the form of: #H ##### (e.g. 2H 50035).

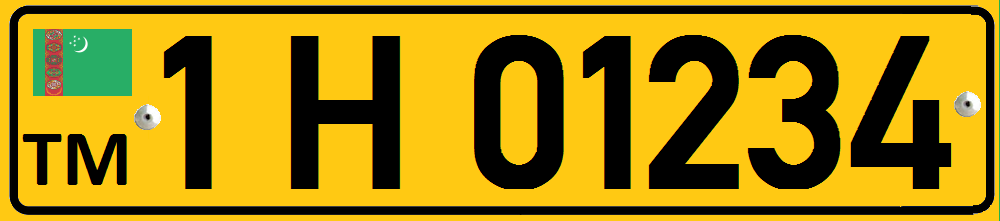

==== Foreign trailers ====
These feature black alphanumerics rendered in DIN 1451 on a yellow background, and take the form of: #HT ### (e.g. 2HT 5035).

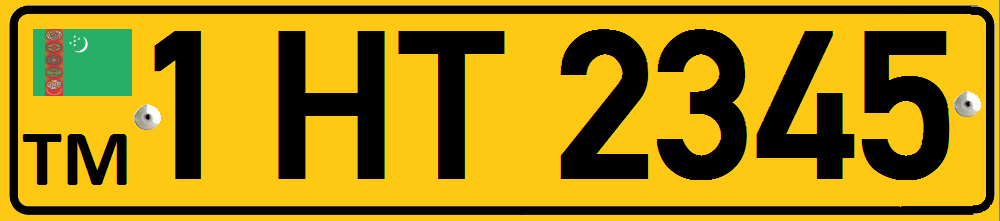

==== Export ====
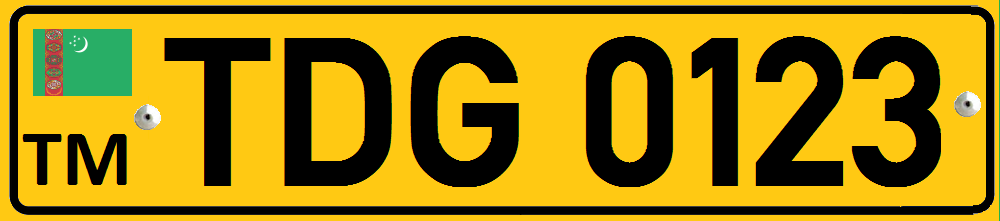

==== Government ====
Government plates are green with silver characters arranged in the following format: ## ## XXX – where # is any digit between 0 and 9, and X is a letter from the Latin alphabet. An example of a governmental plate issued in the capital, Ashkhabad, would look like this: 00 33 AGA. Unusually, all the characters are rendered in the typeface formerly used on French registration plates.

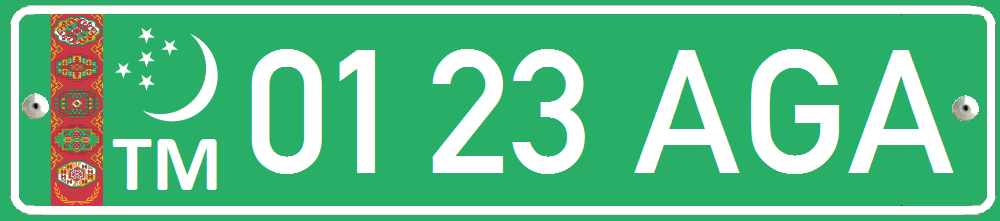

===== Military =====
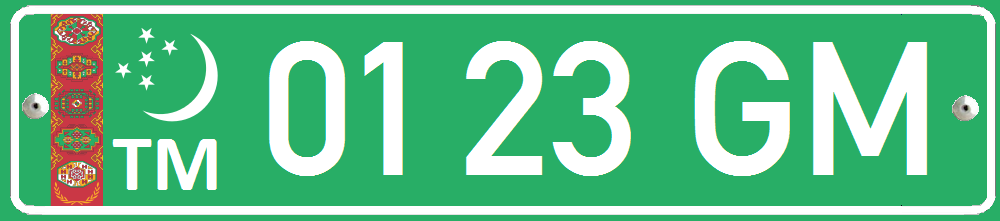

===== Ceremony =====
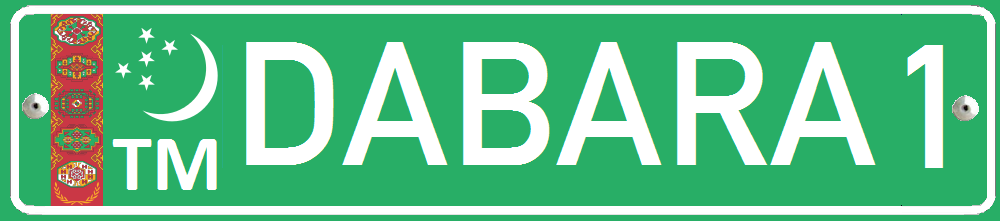
