= Khorramabad Rural District =

Rural district in Qazvin province, Iran

Khorramabad Rural District Persian: دهستان خرم آباد
- Rural District
- Location within Iran
- Coordinates: 36°04′N 49°46′E
- Country: Iran
- Province: Qazvin
- County: Takestan
- District: Esfarvarin
- Established: 1997
- Capital: Khorramabad

Population (2016)
  - Total: 6,609
- Time zone: UTC+3:30 (IRST)

Khorramabad Rural District (Persian: دهستان خرم آباد) is in Esfarvarin District of Takestan County, Qazvin province, Iran. Its capital is the village of Khorramabad.

== Demographics ==
=== Population ===
At the time of the 2006 National Census, the rural district's population was 6,459 in 1,545 households. There were 6,611 inhabitants in 1,947 households at the following census of 2011. The 2016 census measured the population of the rural district as 6,609 in 2,060 households. The most populous of its four villages was Kahak, with 2,827 people.

=== Other villages in the rural district ===
- Dialabad
- Shorket-e Zormorgh
