= Esfarvarin =

City in Qazvin province, Iran

Esfarvarin Persian: اسفرورين
- City
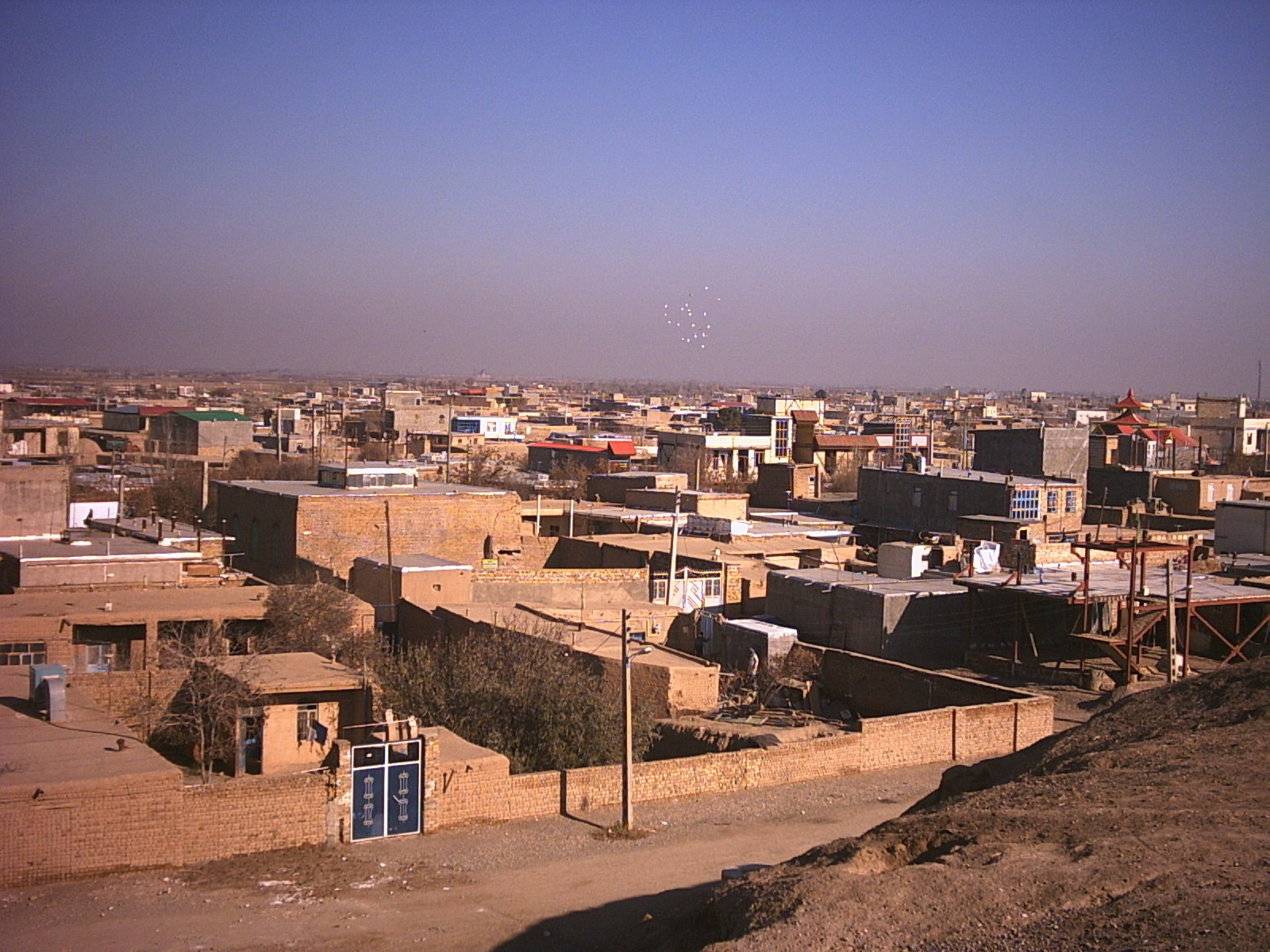
- The city of Esfarvarin

- Location within Iran
- Coordinates: 35°55′59″N 49°44′49″E
- Country: Iran
- Province: Qazvin
- County: Takestan
- District: Esfarvarin
- Established as a city: 1989

Population (2016)
  - Total: 12,371
- Time zone: UTC+3:30 (IRST)
- Area code: +98283552

Esfarvarin (Persian: اسفرورين) (Note: Also romanized as Asfarvarīn) is a city in, and the capital of, Esfarvarin District in Takestan County, Qazvin province, Iran. The village of Esfarvarin was converted to a city in 1989 and is famous for its vineyards.

== Demographics ==
=== Language and ethnicity ===
The people of Esfarvarin are Tat, Persian and Turkic and speak Tati language, Persian and Turkic.

=== Population ===
At the time of the 2006 National Census, the city's population was 12,104 in 2,670 households. The following census in 2011 counted 12,615 people in 3,225 households. The 2016 census measured the population of the city as 12,371 people in 3,394 households.

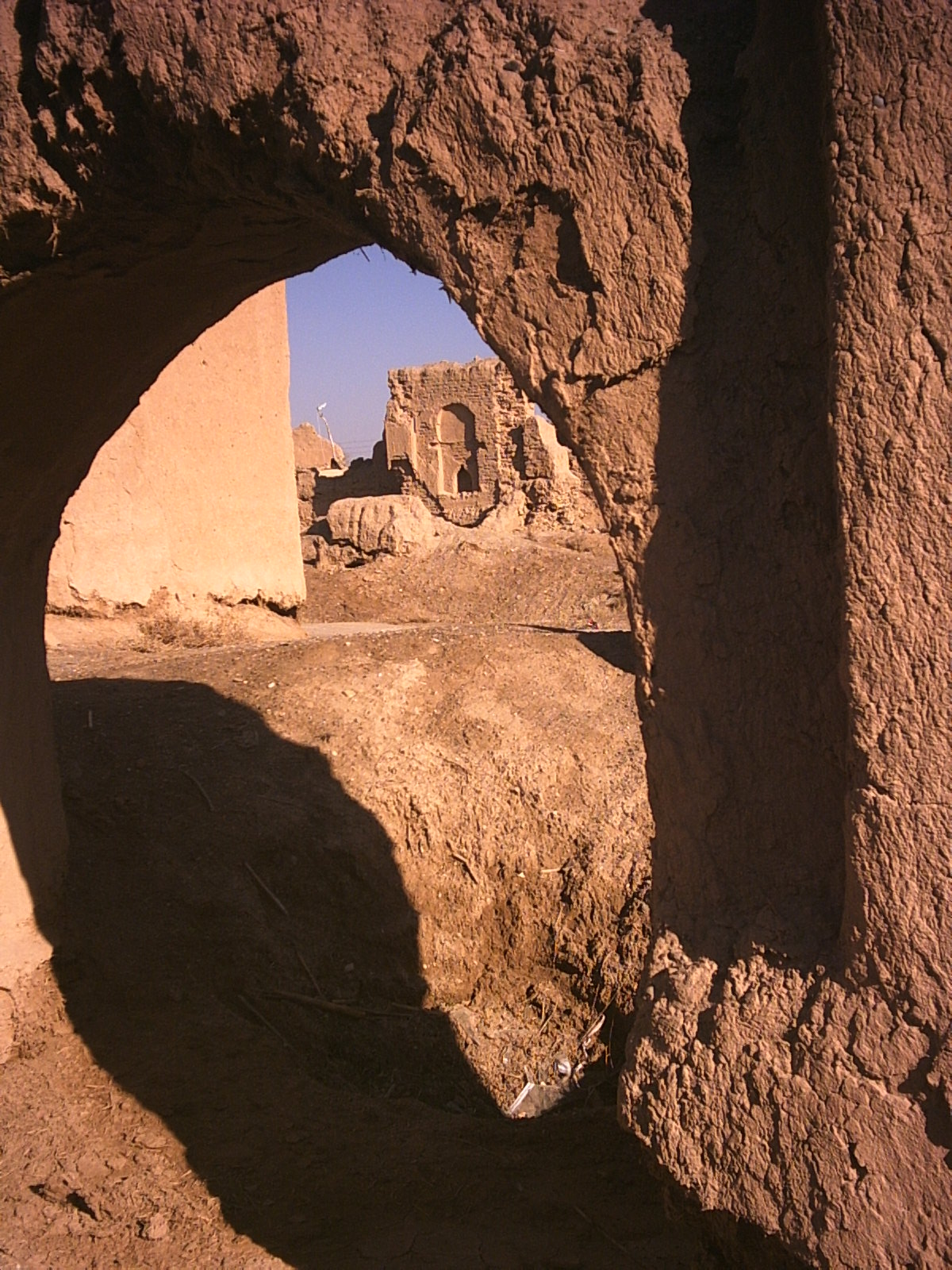
Old house in Esfarvarin
