= Ak, Takestan =

Village in Qazvin province, Iran

Ak Persian: آک
- Village
- Location within Iran
- Coordinates: 36°00′09″N 49°42′46″E
- Country: Iran
- Province: Qazvin
- County: Takestan
- District: Esfarvarin
- Rural District: Ak

Population (2016)
  - Total: 3,220
- Time zone: UTC+3:30 (IRST)

Ak (Persian: آک) (Note: Also known as Ak Kant and Āq Kant) is a village in, and the capital of, Ak Rural District in Esfarvarin District of Takestan County, Qazvin province, Iran.

== Demographics ==
=== Population ===
At the time of the 2006 National Census, the village's population was 3,484 in 834 households. The following census in 2011 counted 3,082 people in 859 households. The 2016 census measured the population of the village as 3,220 people in 950 households. It was the most populous village in its rural district.
