= Ak Rural District =

Rural district in Qazvin province, Iran

Ak Rural District Persian: دهستان اك
- Rural District
- Location within Iran
- Coordinates: 35°58′N 49°45′E
- Country: Iran
- Province: Qazvin
- County: Takestan
- District: Esfarvarin
- Established: 1997
- Capital: Ak

Population (2016)
  - Total: 10,320
- Time zone: UTC+3:30 (IRST)

Ak Rural District (Persian: دهستان اك) is in Esfarvarin District of Takestan County, Qazvin province, Iran. Its capital is the village of Ak.

== Demographics ==
=== Population ===
At the time of the 2006 National Census, the rural district's population was 10,282 in 2,368 households. There were 9,880 inhabitants in 2,730 households at the following census of 2011. The 2016 census measured the population of the rural district as 10,320 in 2,999 households. The most populous of its 13 villages was Ak, with 3,220 people.

=== Other villages in the rural district ===
- Kharuzan
- Lushkan
- Mahmudabad
- Nasirabad-e Sadat
- Qarqasin
- Sharin
- Valazjerd
