= AK (radio program) =

AK was a weekly radio program broadcast on the Alaska Public Radio network. Past episodes of AK are available through a podcast archive.

AK focused on Alaskan issues. The program encouraged participation from all of its listeners.

== History ==
The pilot of AK was called Weekend Alaska and was produced in January and February 2002. It was broadcast on many public radio stations in March. A grant application was made to the Corporation for Public Broadcasting (CPB) and awarded in summer 2003. A production team was assembled, consisting of Shelly Wozniak (host), Ellen Lockyer (reporter), Jessica Cochran (producer), Duncan Moon (editor/executive producer) and John Nelson (audio engineer). AK began weekly in October 2003.

In April 2004, Gabriel Spitzer took over as host and Wozniak became audio engineer. In August 2004, Ashley Gross joined as an interim producer for several months, then continued as a part-time reporter for the show. In May 2006, Rebecca Sheir took over as host when Spitzer left for Chicago Public Radio.

In August 2006, the staff was notified that the show was canceled, and most were laid off. After a public outcry, CPB stepped in with an additional grant and, after a 4-week hiatus during which old shows were re-broadcast, production resumed with the same staff.

In December 2006, Gross left for Chicago also, and Bonnie-Sue Hitchcock joined the team as Fairbanks reporter. In June 2007, Hitchcock left for a fellowship in environmental reporting in Boulder, Colorado and Scott Burton joined as a reporter based in Juneau.

The show was again cancelled due to continuing funding problems and its last episode was on December 20, 2008.

== Awards ==
AK was recognized since its inception for its high production quality and story telling. It won a second place award from the Public Radio News Directors Incorporated for a show produced only six weeks after its debut. In 2004, it won first place – Best News and Public Affairs show in the country, Division A - for the "Alaska Myths and Misconceptions" show, in 2005 for the "Communication Show" and in 2006 for the "Five Senses" show. AK received a 2007 Clarion Award for the best radio regular feature program.
