= Vehicle registration plates of Zimbabwe =

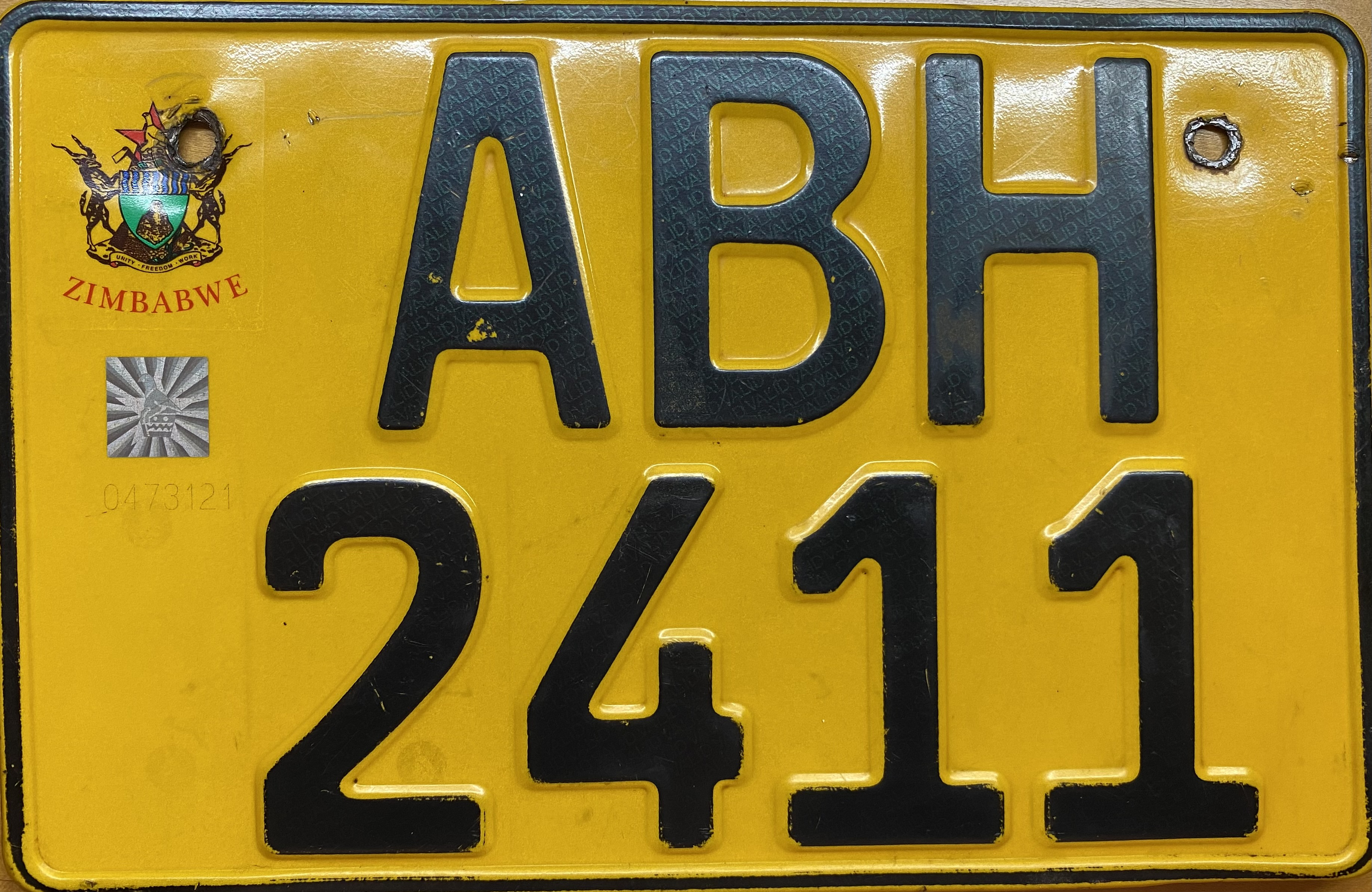
A square Zimbabwean license plate, issued after 2006.

Since 2006 vehicle registration plates of Zimbabwe are composed of three letters and four numbers (e.g. ABC 1234). The dimensions of Zimbabwean number plates are the same as British plates, but use the FE-Schrift typeface since 2006, used for German vehicle registration plates.

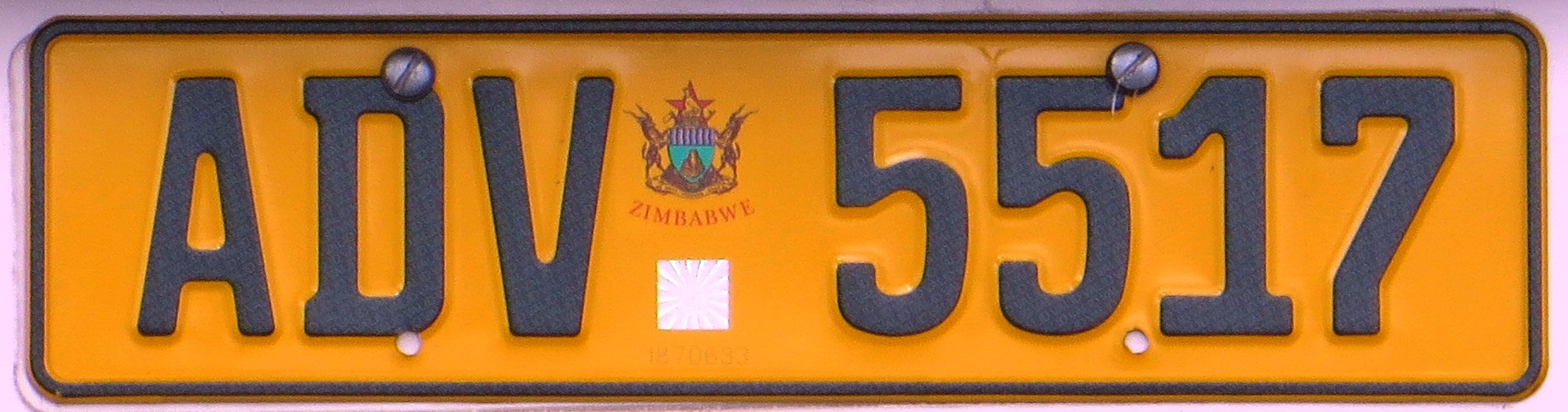
Plates since 2006

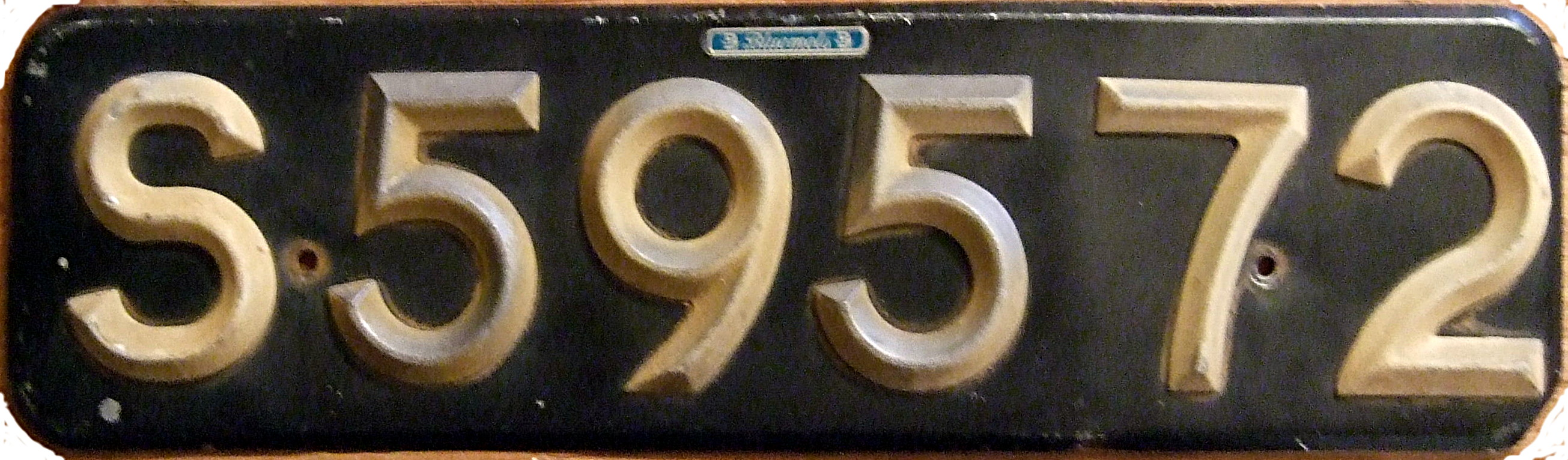
"S" prefixed serial number denotes this plate issued in Salisbury, Southern Rhodesia, between 1931 and 1958

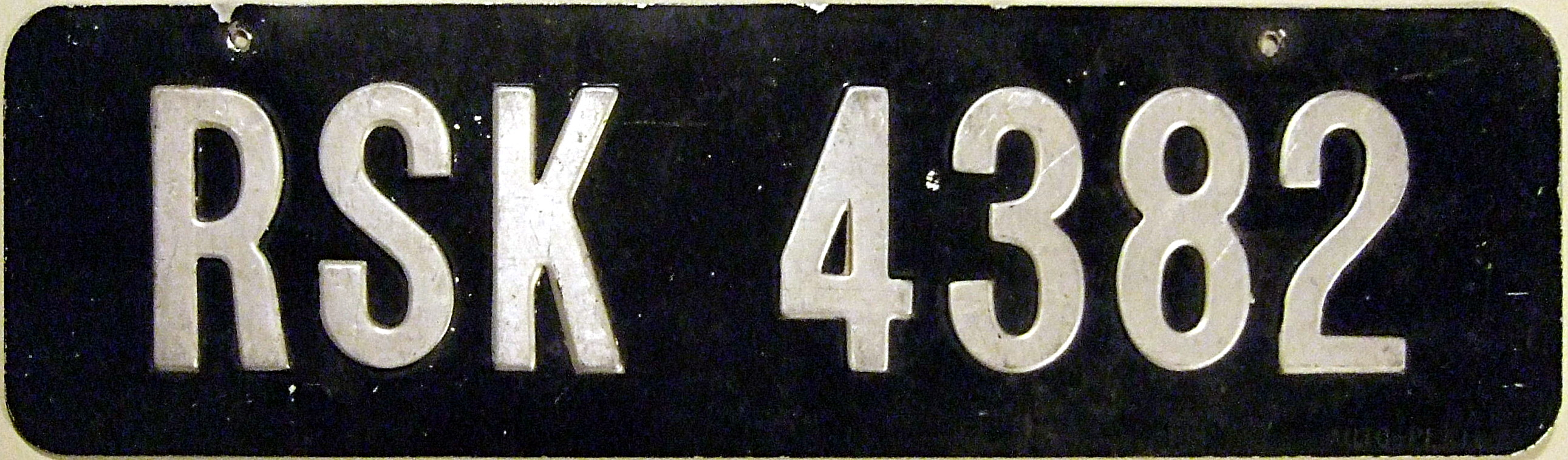
"R" prefixed serial number denotes this plate issued in Salisbury, Rhodesia, between 1965 and 1979

They were introduced before independence from Britain, when the country was known as Rhodesia and were not changed by the government following independence in 1980. For private vehicles, characters are in black on a yellow background, although white backgrounds were introduced in 2006. For commercial vehicles, characters are in red on a white background. 2006 number plates sometimes show Zimbabwe national symbols, such as the coat of arms. The plates are made of metal. Military plates are white-on-black, the last two numbers denote the year, so 123 AB 81 would be 1981.

== System ==
The below are representative examples of Zimbabwean plates, the top plate of each example represents the front plate of the car, whilst the bottom denotes the rear.

1971 to 2006 (Private)

123-456A
789-012Z

1971 to 2006 (Commercial)

AED 1733
AED 1733

1971 to present (Military), YY denotes the year

AED 1733
AED 1733

2006 to present

AED 1733
AED 1733

AED 1733
AED 1733
