= Vehicle registration plates of Kyrgyzstan =

Kyrgyz Republic
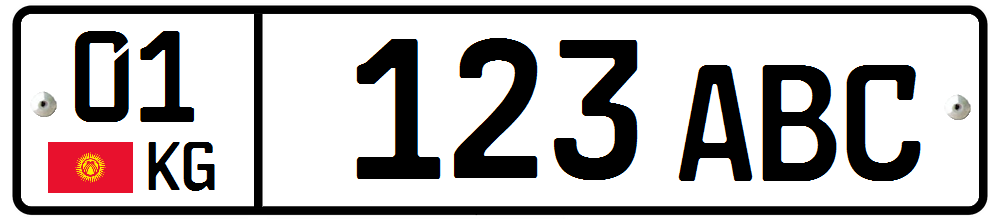
- Kyrgyz regular legal standard number plate.
- Country: Kyrgyzstan
- Country code: KG

Current series
- Size: 520 mm × 110 mm 20.5 in × 4.3 in
- Serial format: 01 123ABC (01 being the regional code)
- Colour (front): Black on white
- Colour (rear): Black on white

Kyrgyz registration plates were first issued in 1980, when the country was still a republic of the Soviet Union. Despite having gained its independence in 1991, it continued to use the old Soviet plates until the introduction of the current format in 1994.

== Formats ==
=== 1980-1993 ===
Between 1980 and 1993, Kyrgyz plates were manufactured to the Soviet GOST 3207-77 standard. The characters were of the following format: x ## ## XX where x is a lowercase Cyrillic counter letter; # is any digit between 0 and 9; and XX are two uppercase Cyrillic letters indicating where the vehicle was registered (e.g. БИ for Bishkek).

с 15 63 БИ

=== 1994 ===
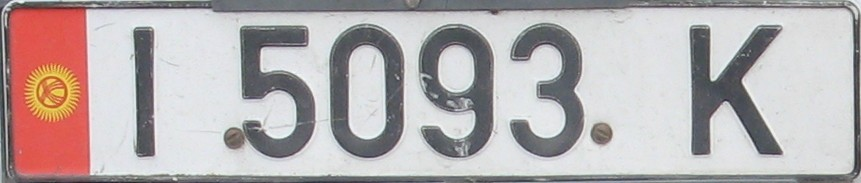
1994-series Kyrgyz registration plate

1994 saw the launch of another format, which resembles more closely the style of registration plates used in Europe. The most notable changes are the switch from Cyrillic letters to Latin, and the presence of the Kyrgyz flag in a narrow band to the left of the plate. The alphanumerics are rendered in DIN 1451. The plate format was X #### XX or X #### X, with the first letter based on geographic location.

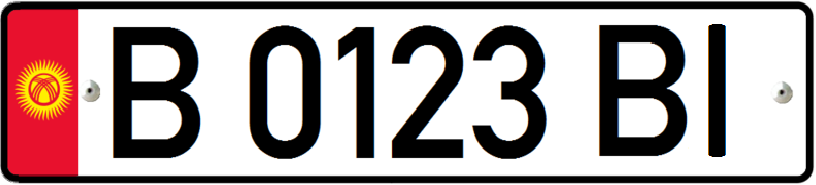

=== 2015 ===
Starting from July 2015, a new system has entered into circulation. Each province now has a two digit code. The new license plates have the font FE-Schrift. The numbers usually have a font size slightly larger than the letters, similar to Russian vehicle registration plates.

==== Private vehicles ====
The license plates have the format ## - ### xxx, where the first two digits are province codes. The plate is black on white. Right under the province codes, there is the Kyrgyz flag and the code KG.

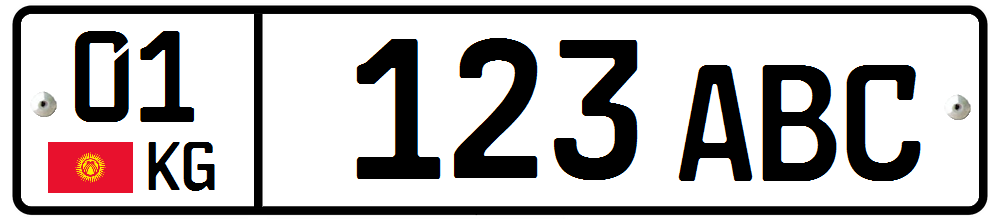

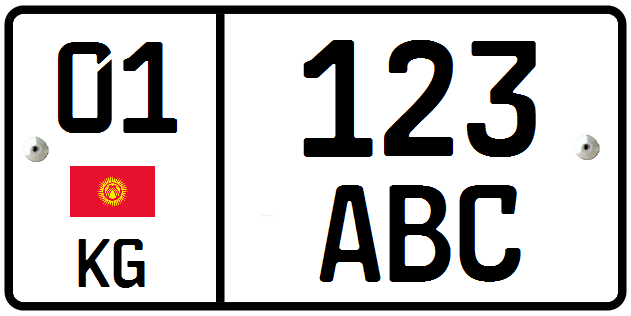

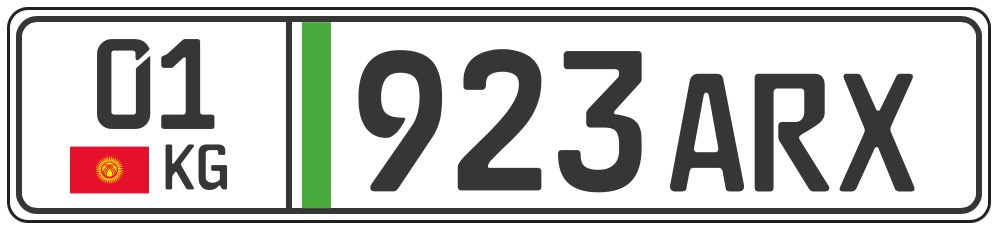

==== Motorcycles ====
The license plates have the format ## - ### xx, where the first two digits are province codes. The plate is black on white.

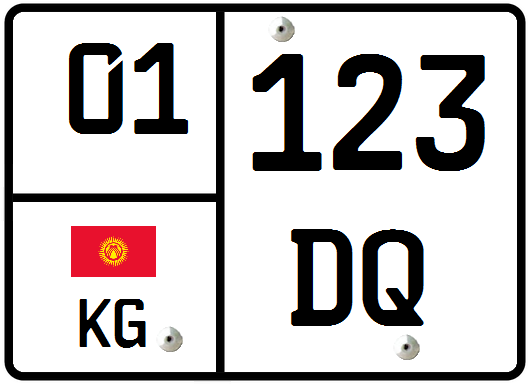

==== Governmental vehicles ====
The license plates have the format ## - ### PT, where the first two digits are province codes. The plate is black on white.

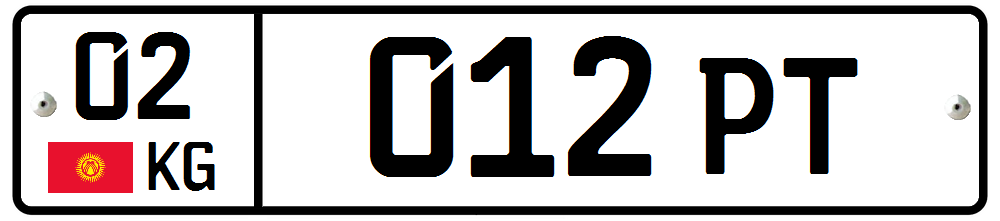

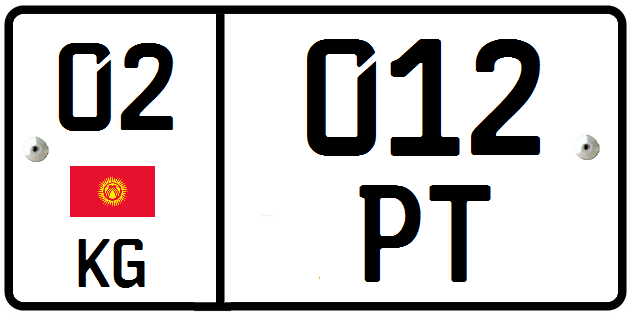

==== President ====
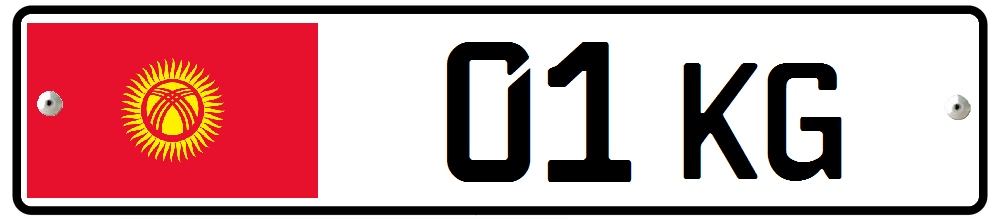

==== Foreign ====
The following plates are black on yellow. These flags show the code KG, but not the Kyrgyz flag. These plates have the following format: ## - #### L, where the first two digits are the province codes. The letter would be either of the following:

- H: For a vehicle owned by a foreign citizen.
- P: For a vehicles who would be in the country for more than 6 months
- M: For foreign firms, their staff and families.
- K: Belonging to foreign media

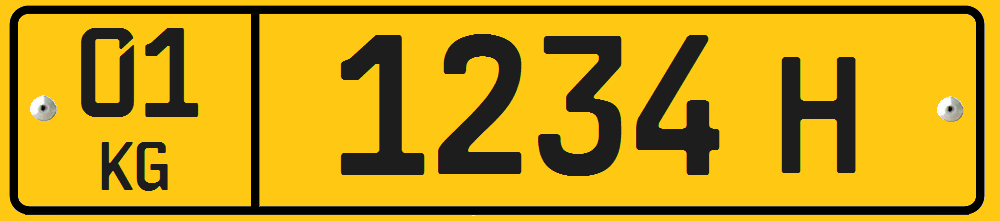

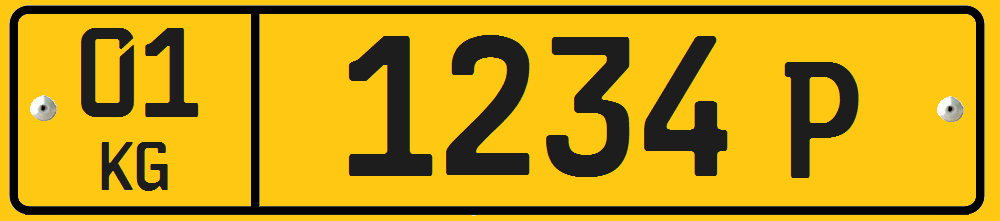

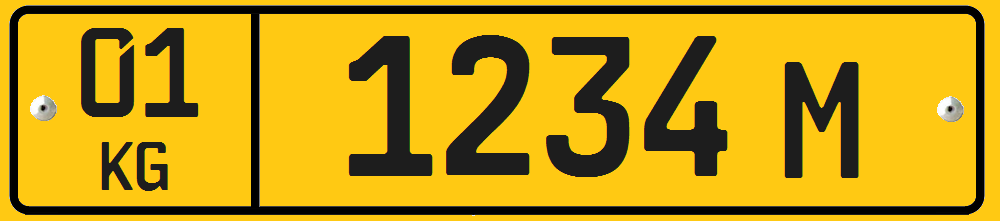

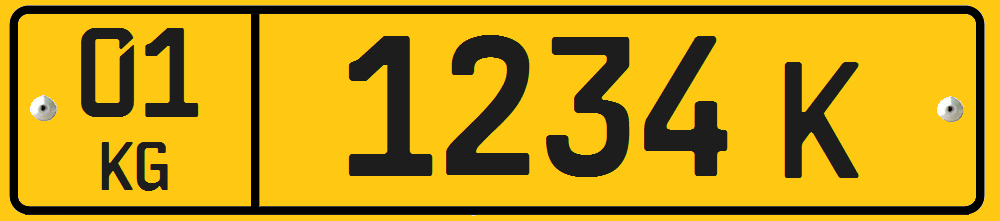

==== Diplomatic ====
Diplomatic license plates are white on red, whereas the license plates for UN vehicles are white on blue. The license plates have the format L ## ###. The letter could be any of the following:

- C: Official and personal vehicles of heads of consular posts and staff, i.e. Corps consulaires
- D: Vehicles of diplomatic and other international organizations, as well as personal vehicles chapters (new format) and employees of the diplomatic rank of the offices, organizations, missions and members of their families, i.e. Corps diplomatiques
- T: Vehicles of administrative and technical staff of diplomatic and consular missions, other international organizations and the family members of these employees.

The two digit number would be the country or organization code. The following table shows the codes:

Country name	Code	International Organization	Code	(United Nations) UN Agency	Code
Turkey	01	EBRD	50	UNDP	01
United States	02	IMF	51	UNHCR	02
China	03	World Bank	52	UNICEF	03
Russia	04	MIR TV	53	UNFPA	04
Germany	05	(Switzerland) Swiss Corporation Office	54		
Iran	06	GIZ	55		
Kazakhstan	07	IOM	56		
India	08	UK DfID	57		
Belarus	09	OSCE	58		
Pakistan	10	SOS Children's Villages	59		
Uzbekistan	11	JICA	60		
Ukraine	12	ADB	61		
Afghanistan	13	ICRC	62		
Tajikistan	14	Aga Khan	63		
Japan	15	ISTC	64		
South Korea	16				
European Union	17				
France	18				
Azerbaijan	19				

The three digit number is assigned in increasing order. Numbers 001 to 099 are assigned to diplomatic missions, and numbers 100 to 999 to private cars of the diplomats. On the right end, the date of the issuance of the plate is posted, with the month on the top, and the year on the bottom.

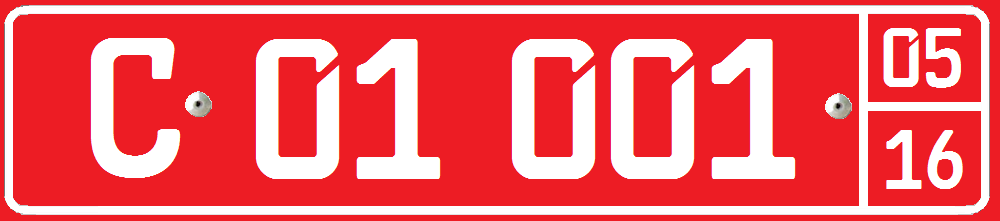

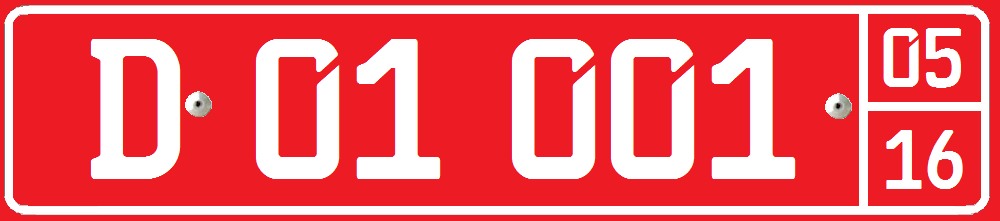

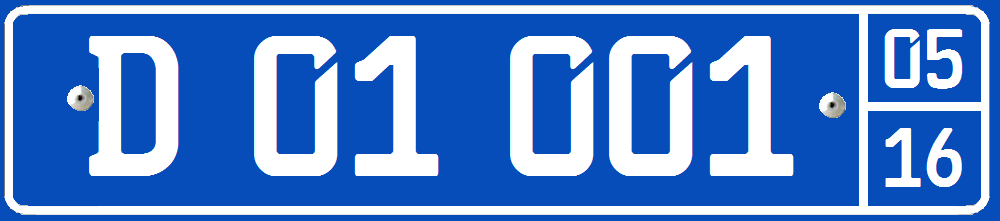

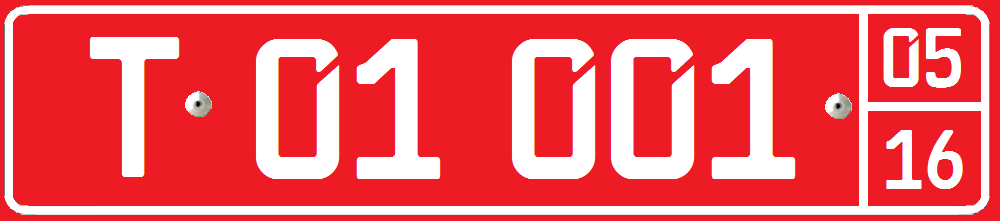

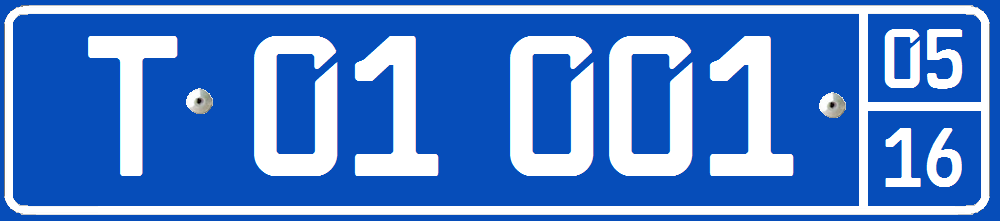

Honorary Consulate plates are white on red, and have the format HC ####, where the four digit number is the country code. On the right end, the date of the issuance of the plate is posted, with the month on the top, and the year on the bottom.

Country name	Code
Latvia	1001
Hungary	1101
Italy	1201
Canada	1301
Sweden	1401
United Kingdom	1501
Cyprus	1601
Czech Republic	1701
Moldova	1801
Slovakia	1901
Romania	2001
Lithuania	2101
Netherlands	2201
Turkey	2301
Belgium	2401

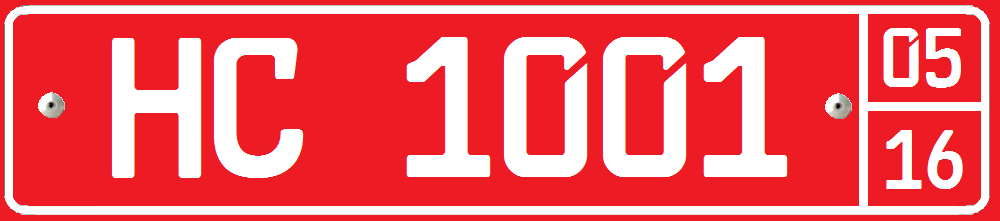

There's also a license plate format for official and personal vehicles of heads of diplomatic missions.

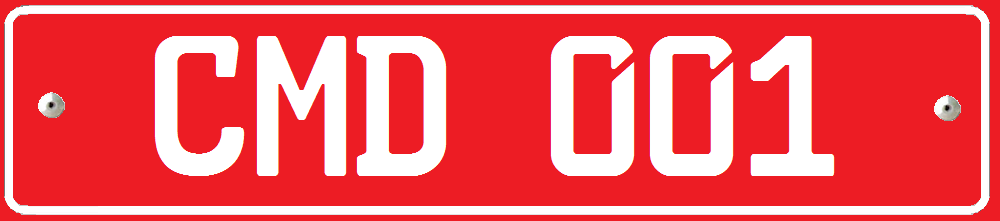

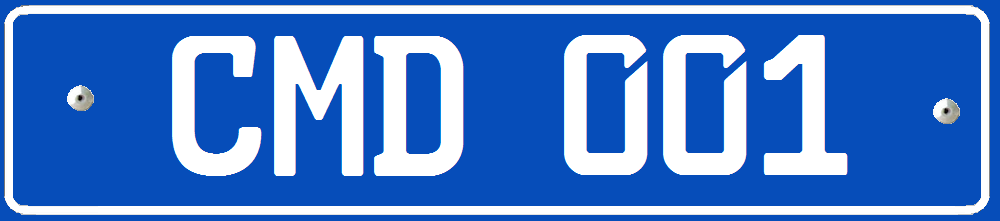

== Region identifiers ==
=== Current ===
Starting from July 2016, a two digit code has been assigned to each region, similar to the format in Russia. There is a potential to add more codes to each region, as each of the existing codes get used up.

Code	Region
01	Bishkek
02	Osh
03	Batken Region
04	Jalal-Abad Region
05	Naryn Region
06	Osh Region
07	Talas Region
08	Chüy Region
09	Issyk-Kul Region
10	Legalized
11	Temporary

=== 1994-2016 ===
Prefix	Region
А	Batken Region
B	Bishkek
C	Chüy Region
D	Jalal-Abad Region
E	Bishkek (outskirts)
I	Issyk-Kul Region
H/N	Naryn Region
O	Osh
S	Chüy Region
T	Talas Region
Z	Osh Region

=== 1980-1994 ===
Suffix	Region
БИ	Bishkek
ЖА	Jalal-Abad Region
ИК	Issyk-Kul Region
НР	Naryn Region
ОШ	Osh Region
ТФ	Talas Region
ТЯ	Tian Shan Region
ФИ	Chüy Region
ЧС	Chüy Region
