= Esfarvarin District =

District in Qazvin province, Iran

Esfarvarin District Persian: بخش اسفرورین
- District
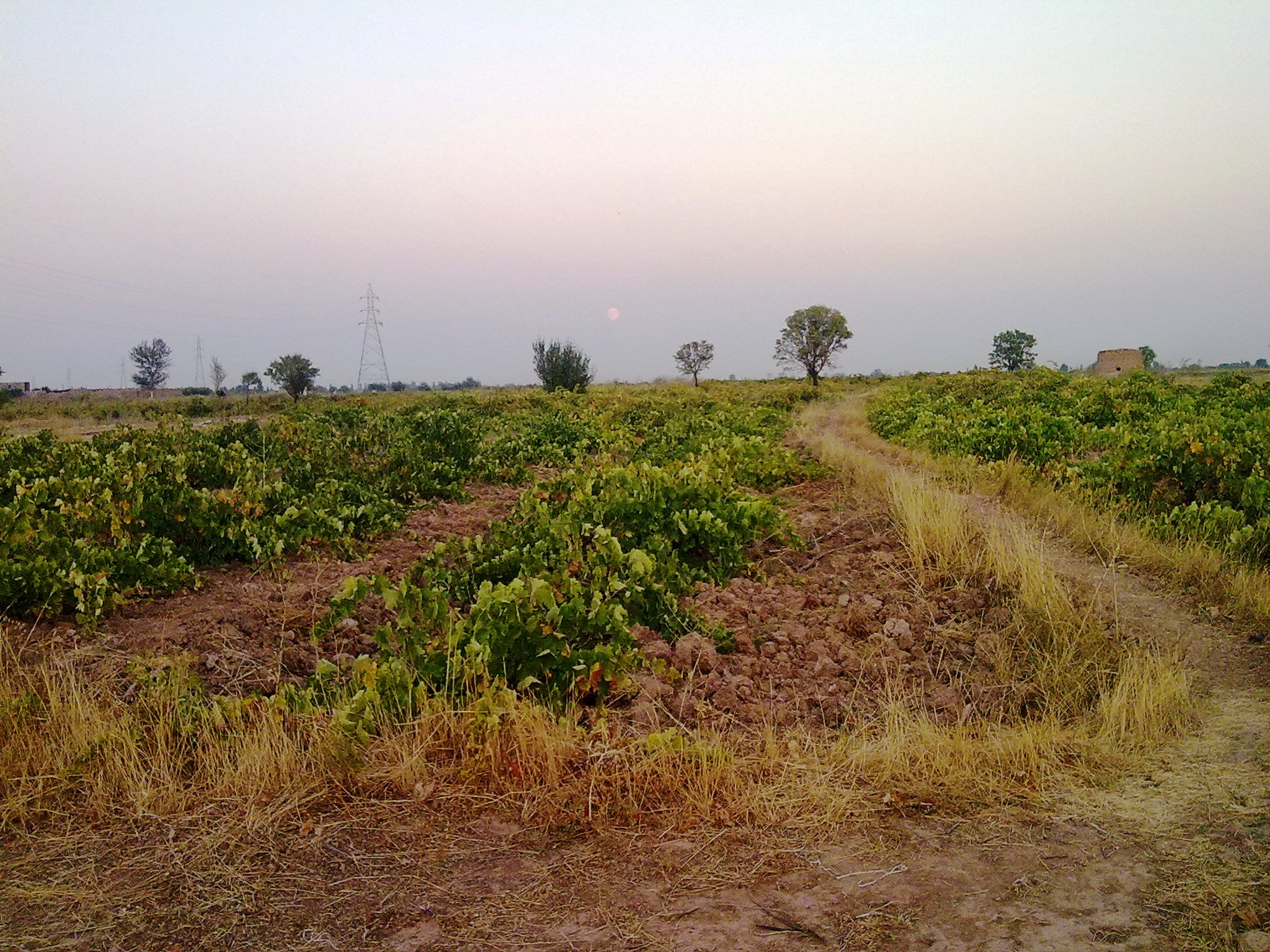
- Vineyard in Kadkhodazamin

- Location within Iran
- Coordinates: 36°00′N 49°45′E
- Country: Iran
- Province: Qazvin
- County: Takestan
- Established: 1997
- Capital: Esfarvarin

Population (2016)
  - Total: 29,300
- Time zone: UTC+3:30 (IRST)

Esfarvarin District (Persian: بخش اسفرورین) is in Takestan County, Qazvin province, Iran. Its capital is the city of Esfarvarin.

== Demographics ==
=== Population ===
At the time of the 2006 National Census, the district's population was 28,845 in 6,583 households. The following census in 2011 counted 29,106 people in 7,902 households. The 2016 census measured the population of the district as 29,300 inhabitants in 8,453 households.

=== Administrative divisions ===
Esfarvarin District Population
Administrative Divisions	2006	2011	2016
Ak RD	10,282	9,880	10,320
Khorramabad RD	6,459	6,611	6,609
Esfarvarin (city)	12,104	12,615	12,371
Total	28,845	29,106	29,300
RD = Rural District
