= Allatman =

Village in Razavi Khorasan province, Iran

Allatman Persian: الاتمان
- Village
- Location within Iran
- Coordinates: 36°47′20″N 58°38′49″E
- Country: Iran
- Province: Razavi Khorasan
- County: Quchan
- District: Abkuh
- Rural District: Bahar

Population (2016)
  - Total: 33
- Time zone: UTC+3:30 (IRST)

Allatman (Persian: الاتمان) (Note: Also romanized as Alatmān and Āllātmān) is a village in Bahar Rural District of Abkuh District in Quchan County, Razavi Khorasan province, Iran.

== Demographics ==
=== Population ===
At the time of the 2006 National Census, the village's population was 47 in 13 households, when it was in Dughayi Rural District of the Central District. The following census in 2011 counted 42 people in 10 households. The 2016 census measured the population of the village as 33 people in nine households.

In 2020, the rural district was separated from the district in the formation of Abkuh District, and Allatman was transferred to Bahar Rural District created in the new district.
