= Andarzi =

Village in Razavi Khorasan province, Iran

Andarzi Persian: اندرزي
- Village
- Location within Iran
- Coordinates: 36°46′20″N 58°48′31″E
- Country: Iran
- Province: Razavi Khorasan
- County: Quchan
- District: Abkuh
- Rural District: Bahar

Population (2016)
  - Total: 463
- Time zone: UTC+3:30 (IRST)

Andarzi (Persian: اندرزي) (Note: Also romanized as Andarzī) is a village in Bahar Rural District of Abkuh District in Quchan County, Razavi Khorasan province, Iran.

== Demographics ==
=== Population ===
At the time of the 2006 National Census, the village's population was 436 in 90 households, when it was in Dughayi Rural District of the Central District. The following census in 2011 counted 459 people in 114 households. The 2016 census measured the population of the village as 463 people in 122 households.

In 2020, the rural district was separated from the district in the formation of Abkuh District, and Andarzi was transferred to Bahar Rural District created in the new district.
