= Lalu, Iran =

Village in Razavi Khorasan province, Iran

Lalu Persian: لالو
- Village
- Location within Iran
- Coordinates: 36°40′33″N 58°42′50″E
- Country: Iran
- Province: Razavi Khorasan
- County: Quchan
- District: Abkuh
- Rural District: Bahar

Population (2016)
  - Total: 43
- Time zone: UTC+3:30 (IRST)

Lalu (Persian: لالو) (Note: Also romanized as Lālū) is a village in Bahar Rural District of Abkuh District in Quchan County, Razavi Khorasan province, Iran.

== Demographics ==
=== Population ===
The village did not appear in the 2006 and 2011 National Censuses, when it was in the Dughayi Rural District of the Central District. The 2016 census measured the population of the village as 43 people in 13 households.

In 2020, the rural district was separated from the district in the formation of Abkuh District, and Lalu was transferred to Bahar Rural District created in the new district.
