= Jafarabad-e Olya, Dughayi =

Village in Razavi Khorasan province, Iran

Jafarabad-e Olya Persian: جعفرابادعليا
- Village
- Location within Iran
- Coordinates: 37°00′37″N 58°37′42″E
- Country: Iran
- Province: Razavi Khorasan
- County: Quchan
- District: Abkuh
- Rural District: Dughayi

Population (2016)
  - Total: 552
- Time zone: UTC+3:30 (IRST)

Jafarabad-e Olya (Persian: جعفرابادعليا) (Note: Also romanized as Ja‘farābād-e ‘Olyā; also known as Ja‘farābād-e Sharqī (جعفرابادشرقي)) is a village in Dughayi Rural District of Abkuh District in Quchan County, Razavi Khorasan province, Iran.

== Demographics ==
=== Population ===
At the time of the 2006 National Census, the village's population was 632 in 161 households, when it was in Sudlaneh Rural District of the Central District. The following census in 2011 counted 573 people in 166 households. The 2016 census measured the population of the village as 552 people in 200 households.

In 2020, Jafarabad-e Olya was separated from the district in the formation of Abkuh District and transferred to Dughayi Rural District in the new district.
