= Kotlar =

Village in Razavi Khorasan province, Iran

Kotlar Persian: كتلر
- Village
- Location within Iran
- Coordinates: 36°57′50″N 58°28′37″E
- Country: Iran
- Province: Razavi Khorasan
- County: Quchan
- District: Abkuh
- Rural District: Dughayi

Population (2016)
  - Total: 322
- Time zone: UTC+3:30 (IRST)

Kotlar (Persian: كتلر) is a village in Dughayi Rural District of Abkuh District in Quchan County, Razavi Khorasan province, Iran.

== Demographics ==
=== Population ===
At the time of the 2006 National Census, the village's population was 233 in 57 households, when it was in Sudlaneh Rural District of the Central District. The following census in 2011 counted 163 people in 49 households. The 2016 census measured the population of the village as 322 people in 100 households.

In 2020, Kotlar was separated from the district in the formation of Abkuh District and transferred to Dughayi Rural District in the new district.
