= Kalateh-ye Fathabad-e Sharqi =

Village in Razavi Khorasan province, Iran

Kalateh-ye Fathabad-e Sharqi Persian: كلاته فتح ابادشرقي
- Village
- Location within Iran
- Coordinates: 37°01′03″N 58°35′58″E
- Country: Iran
- Province: Razavi Khorasan
- County: Quchan
- District: Abkuh
- Rural District: Dughayi

Population (2016)
  - Total: 41
- Time zone: UTC+3:30 (IRST)

Kalateh-ye Fathabad-e Sharqi (Persian: كلاته فتح ابادشرقي) (Note: Also romanized as Kalāteh-ye Fatḩābād-e Sharqī; also known as Fatḩābād) is a village in Dughayi Rural District of Abkuh District in Quchan County, Razavi Khorasan province, Iran.

== Demographics ==
=== Population ===
At the time of the 2006 National Census, the village's population was 64 in 13 households, when it was in Sudlaneh Rural District of the Central District. The following census in 2011 counted 47 people in 13 households. The 2016 census measured the population of the village as 41 people in 15 households.

In 2020, Kalateh-ye Fathabad-e Sharqi was separated from the district in the formation of Abkuh District and transferred to Dughayi Rural District in the new district.
