= Dulu, Razavi Khorasan =

Village in Razavi Khorasan province, Iran

Dulu Persian: دولو
- Village
- Location within Iran
- Coordinates: 36°58′43″N 58°32′21″E
- Country: Iran
- Province: Razavi Khorasan
- County: Quchan
- District: Abkuh
- Rural District: Dughayi

Population (2016)
  - Total: 364
- Time zone: UTC+3:30 (IRST)

Dulu (Persian: دولو) (Note: Also romanized as Dūlū; also known as Dolū) is a village in Dughayi Rural District of Abkuh District in Quchan County, Razavi Khorasan province, Iran.

== Demographics ==
=== Population ===
At the time of the 2006 National Census, the village's population was 316 in 76 households, when it was in Sudlaneh Rural District of the Central District. The following census in 2011 counted 217 people in 65 households. The 2016 census measured the population of the village as 364 people in 125 households.

In 2020, Dulu was separated from the district in the formation of Abkuh District and transferred to Dughayi Rural District in the new district.
