= Kheyrabad, Quchan =

Village in Razavi Khorasan province, Iran

Kheyrabad Persian: خيراباد
- Village
- Location within Iran
- Coordinates: 36°47′24″N 58°44′06″E
- Country: Iran
- Province: Razavi Khorasan
- County: Quchan
- District: Abkuh
- Rural District: Bahar

Population (2016)
  - Total: 35
- Time zone: UTC+3:30 (IRST)

Kheyrabad (Persian: خيراباد) (Note: Also romanized as Kheyrābād) is a village in Bahar Rural District of Abkuh District in Quchan County, Razavi Khorasan province, Iran.

== Demographics ==
=== Population ===
At the time of the 2006 National Census, the village's population was 41 in 11 households, when it was in Dughayi Rural District of the Central District. The following census in 2011 counted 33 people in 10 households. The 2016 census measured the population of the village as 35 people in 11 households.

In 2020, the rural district was separated from the district in the formation of Abkuh District, and Kheyrabad was transferred to Bahar Rural District created in the new district.
