= Yazdanabad-e Sharqi =

Village in Razavi Khorasan province, Iran

Yazdanabad-e Sharqi Persian: يزدان ابادشرقي
- Village
- Location within Iran
- Coordinates: 36°53′28″N 58°42′40″E
- Country: Iran
- Province: Razavi Khorasan
- County: Quchan
- District: Abkuh
- Rural District: Bahar

Population (2016)
  - Total: 80
- Time zone: UTC+3:30 (IRST)

Yazdanabad-e Sharqi (Persian: يزدان ابادشرقي) (Note: Also romanized as Yazdānābād-e Sharqī; also known as Yazdānābād) is a village in Bahar Rural District of Abkuh District in Quchan County, Razavi Khorasan province, Iran.

== Demographics ==
=== Population ===
At the time of the 2006 National Census, the village's population was 41 in 10 households, when it was in Dughayi Rural District of the Central District. The following census in 2011 counted 19 people in six households. The 2016 census measured the population of the village as 80 people in 26 households.

In 2020, the rural district was separated from the district in the formation of Abkuh District, and Yazdanabad-e Sharqi was transferred to Bahar Rural District created in the new district.
