= Farkhan =

Farkhan (Persian: فرخان) may refer to:

- Farkhan-e Kohneh
- Farkhan-e Olya
- Farkhan-e Shahrah
- Farkhan-e Sofla
