= Sahlabad, Quchan =

Village in Razavi Khorasan province, Iran

Sahlabad Persian: سهل اباد
- Village
- Location within Iran
- Coordinates: 36°46′31″N 58°48′18″E
- Country: Iran
- Province: Razavi Khorasan
- County: Quchan
- District: Abkuh
- Rural District: Bahar

Population (2016)
  - Total: 237
- Time zone: UTC+3:30 (IRST)

Sahlabad (Persian: سهل اباد) (Note: Also romanized as Sahlābād) is a village in Bahar Rural District of Abkuh District in Quchan County, Razavi Khorasan province, Iran.

== Demographics ==
=== Population ===
At the time of the 2006 National Census, the village's population was 257 in 57 households, when it was in Dughayi Rural District of the Central District. The following census in 2011 counted 232 people in 65 households. The 2016 census measured the population of the village as 237 people in 67 households.

In 2020, the rural district was separated from the district in the formation of Abkuh District, and Sahlabad was transferred to Bahar Rural District created in the new district.
