= Zaman Put =

Village in Razavi Khorasan province, Iran

Zaman Put Persian: زمان پوط
- Village
- Location within Iran
- Coordinates: 36°49′40″N 58°46′30″E
- Country: Iran
- Province: Razavi Khorasan
- County: Quchan
- District: Abkuh
- Rural District: Bahar

Population (2016)
  - Total: 133
- Time zone: UTC+3:30 (IRST)

Zaman Put (Persian: زمان پوط) (Note: Also romanized as Zamān Pūţ; also known as Azmān Pūţ) is a village in Bahar Rural District of Abkuh District in Quchan County, Razavi Khorasan province, Iran.

== Demographics ==
=== Population ===
At the time of the 2006 National Census, the village's population was 116 in 30 households, when it was in Dughayi Rural District of the Central District. The following census in 2011 counted 138 people in 42 households. The 2016 census measured the population of the village as 133 people in 42 households.

In 2020, the rural district was separated from the district in the formation of Abkuh District, and Zaman Put was transferred to Bahar Rural District created in the new district.
