= Samangan, Quchan =

Village in Razavi Khorasan province, Iran

Samangan Persian: سمنگان
- Village
- Location within Iran
- Coordinates: 36°48′14″N 58°32′43″E
- Country: Iran
- Province: Razavi Khorasan
- County: Quchan
- District: Abkuh
- Rural District: Bahar

Population (2016)
  - Total: 35
- Time zone: UTC+3:30 (IRST)

Samangan (Persian: سمنگان) (Note: Also romanized as Samangān; also known as Samangām) is a village in Bahar Rural District of Abkuh District in Quchan County, Razavi Khorasan province, Iran.

== Demographics ==
=== Population ===
At the time of the 2006 National Census, the village's population was 19 in five households, when it was in Dughayi Rural District of the Central District. The following census in 2011 counted 14 people in four households. The 2016 census measured the population of the village as 35 people in 11 households.

In 2020, the rural district was separated from the district in the formation of Abkuh District, and Samangan was transferred to Bahar Rural District created in the new district.
