= Rezaabad-e Sharqi =

Village in Razavi Khorasan province, Iran

Rezaabad-e Sharqi Persian: رضاابادشرقي
- Village
- Location within Iran
- Coordinates: 36°53′09″N 58°45′50″E
- Country: Iran
- Province: Razavi Khorasan
- County: Quchan
- District: Abkuh
- Rural District: Bahar

Population (2016)
  - Total: 333
- Time zone: UTC+3:30 (IRST)

Rezaabad-e Sharqi (Persian: رضاابادشرقي) (Note: Also romanized as Reẕāābād-e Sharqī; also known as Chāh-e Reẕāābād, Rāzābād, Reẕāābād, and Rezāābād) is a village in Bahar Rural District of Abkuh District in Quchan County, Razavi Khorasan province, Iran.

== Demographics ==
=== Population ===
At the time of the 2006 National Census, the village's population was 384 in 83 households, when it was in Dughayi Rural District of the Central District. The following census in 2011 counted 257 people in 76 households. The 2016 census measured the population of the village as 333 people in 94 households.

In 2020, the rural district was separated from the district in the formation of Abkuh District, and Rezaabad-e Sharqi was transferred to Bahar Rural District created in the new district.
