= Kalateh-ye Ahmad =

Village in Razavi Khorasan province, Iran

Kalateh-ye Ahmad Persian: كلاته احمد
- Village
- Location within Iran
- Coordinates: 36°47′49″N 58°33′43″E
- Country: Iran
- Province: Razavi Khorasan
- County: Quchan
- District: Abkuh
- Rural District: Bahar

Population (2016)
  - Total: 77
- Time zone: UTC+3:30 (IRST)

Kalateh-ye Ahmad (Persian: كلاته احمد) (Note: Also romanized as Kalāteh-ye Aḩmad) is a village in Bahar Rural District of Abkuh District in Quchan County, Razavi Khorasan province, Iran.

== Demographics ==
=== Population ===
At the time of the 2006 National Census, the village's population was 69 in 24 households, when it was in Dughayi Rural District of the Central District. The following census in 2011 counted 63 people in 22 households. The 2016 census measured the population of the village as 77 people in 31 households.

In 2020, the rural district was separated from the district in the formation of Abkuh District, and Kalateh-ye Ahmad was transferred to Bahar Rural District created in the new district.
