= Kalateh-ye Ali Zeynal =

Village in Razavi Khorasan province, Iran

Kalateh-ye Ali Zeynal Persian: كلاته علي زينل
- Village
- Location within Iran
- Coordinates: 36°48′53″N 58°50′34″E
- Country: Iran
- Province: Razavi Khorasan
- County: Quchan
- District: Abkuh
- Rural District: Bahar

Population (2016)
  - Total: 1,126
- Time zone: UTC+3:30 (IRST)

Kalateh-ye Ali Zeynal (Persian: كلاته علي زينل) (Note: Also romanized as Kalāteh-ye ‘Alī Zeynal; also known as Kalāteh-ye ‘Alī Zeynā) is a village in Bahar Rural District of Abkuh District in Quchan County, Razavi Khorasan province, Iran.

== Demographics ==
=== Population ===
At the time of the 2006 National Census, the village's population was 1,339 in 306 households, when it was in Dughayi Rural District of the Central District. The following census in 2011 counted 1,273 people in 359 households. The 2016 census measured the population of the village as 1,126 people in 354 households.

In 2020, the rural district was separated from the district in the formation of Abkuh District, and Kalateh-ye Ali Zeynal was transferred to Bahar Rural District created in the new district.
