= Kalateh-ye Zaman, Razavi Khorasan =

Village in Razavi Khorasan province, Iran

Kalateh-ye Zaman Persian: كلاته زمان
- Village
- Location within Iran
- Coordinates: 36°46′56″N 58°41′16″E
- Country: Iran
- Province: Razavi Khorasan
- County: Quchan
- District: Abkuh
- Rural District: Bahar

Population (2016)
  - Total: 56
- Time zone: UTC+3:30 (IRST)

Kalateh-ye Zaman (Persian: كلاته زمان) (Note: Also romanized as Kalāteh-ye Zamān and Kalatehzaman) is a village in Bahar Rural District of Abkuh District in Quchan County, Razavi Khorasan province, Iran.

== Demographics ==
=== Population ===
At the time of the 2006 National Census, the village's population was 133 in 37 households, when it was in Dughayi Rural District of the Central District. The following census in 2011 counted 79 people in 25 households. The 2016 census measured the population of the village as 56 people in 23 households.

In 2020, the rural district was separated from the district in the formation of Abkuh District, and Kalateh-ye Zaman was transferred to Bahar Rural District created in the new district.
