= Qaleh-ye Abbas =

Village in Razavi Khorasan province, Iran

Qaleh-ye Abbas Persian: قلعه عباس
- Village
- Location within Iran
- Coordinates: 36°57′53″N 58°31′35″E
- Country: Iran
- Province: Razavi Khorasan
- County: Quchan
- District: Abkuh
- Rural District: Dughayi

Population (2016)
  - Total: 215
- Time zone: UTC+3:30 (IRST)

Qaleh-ye Abbas (Persian: قلعه عباس) (Note: Also romanized as Qal‘eh-ye ‘Abbās; also known as Qal‘eh-ye ‘Abbāsī (قلعه عباسي)) is a village in Dughayi Rural District of Abkuh District in Quchan County, Razavi Khorasan province, Iran.

== Demographics ==
=== Population ===
At the time of the 2006 National Census, the village's population was 232 in 63 households, when it was in Sudlaneh Rural District of the Central District. The following census in 2011 counted 203 people in 57 households. The 2016 census measured the population of the village as 215 people in 67 households.

In 2020, Qaleh-ye Abbas was separated from the district in the formation of Abkuh District and transferred to Dughayi Rural District in the new district.
