= Meshkanlu =

Village in Razavi Khorasan province, Iran

Meshkanlu Persian: مشكانلو
- Village
- Location within Iran
- Coordinates: 36°48′58″N 58°36′11″E
- Country: Iran
- Province: Razavi Khorasan
- County: Quchan
- District: Abkuh
- Rural District: Bahar

Population (2016)
  - Total: 135
- Time zone: UTC+3:30 (IRST)

Meshkanlu (Persian: مشكانلو) (Note: Also romanized as Meshḵānlū; also known as Kalāteh Mollā Moḩammad Qolī, Kalāteh-ye Mollā Mohammad Alī, Kalāteh-ye Mollā Moḩammad ‘Alī, Kalāteh-ye Mollā Moḩammad Qoli, Kalāteh-ye Mollā Qoli (كلاته ملا قلي), and Meshkallū) is a village in Bahar Rural District of Abkuh District in Quchan County, Razavi Khorasan province, Iran.

== Demographics ==
=== Population ===
At the time of the 2006 National Census, the village's population was 298 in 98 households, when it was in Dughayi Rural District of the Central District. The following census in 2011 counted 229 people in 76 households. The 2016 census measured the population of the village as 135 people in 54 households.

In 2020, the rural district was separated from the district in the formation of Abkuh District, and Meshkanlu was transferred to Bahar Rural District created in the new district.
