= Chanbar Gharbal, Quchan =

Village in Razavi Khorasan province, Iran

Chanbar Gharbal Persian: چنبرغربال
- Village
- Location within Iran
- Coordinates: 36°47′32″N 58°49′23″E
- Country: Iran
- Province: Razavi Khorasan
- County: Quchan
- District: Abkuh
- Rural District: Bahar

Population (2016)
  - Total: 257
- Time zone: UTC+3:30 (IRST)

Chanbar Gharbal (Persian: چنبرغربال) (Note: Also romanized as Chanbar Gharbāl; also known as Chahar Bāgh, Chanar Gharbāl, Chanbar Qarbāl, and Kalāteh-ye Chanbar Gharbāl) is a village in Bahar Rural District of Abkuh District in Quchan County, Razavi Khorasan province, Iran.

== Demographics ==
=== Population ===
At the time of the 2006 National Census, the village's population was 375 in 77 households, when it was in Dughayi Rural District of the Central District. The following census in 2011 counted 268 people in 73 households. The 2016 census measured the population of the village as 257 people in 78 households.

In 2020, the rural district was separated from the district in the formation of Abkuh District, and Chanbar Gharbal was transferred to Bahar Rural District created in the new district.
