= Mohammadabad-e Sharqi =

Village in Razavi Khorasan province, Iran

Mohammadabad-e Sharqi Persian: محمدابادشرقي
- Village
- Location within Iran
- Coordinates: 36°59′46″N 58°36′57″E
- Country: Iran
- Province: Razavi Khorasan
- County: Quchan
- District: Abkuh
- Rural District: Dughayi

Population (2016)
  - Total: 224
- Time zone: UTC+3:30 (IRST)

Mohammadabad-e Sharqi (Persian: محمدابادشرقي) (Note: Also romanized as Moḩammadābād-e Sharqī; also known as Bolverīān and Mo’ammadābād-e Sharqī) is a village in Dughayi Rural District of Abkuh District in Quchan County, Razavi Khorasan province, Iran.

== Demographics ==
=== Population ===
At the time of the 2006 National Census, the village's population was 307 in 76 households, when it was in Sudlaneh Rural District of the Central District. The following census in 2011 counted 276 people in 77 households. The 2016 census measured the population of the village as 224 people in 72 households.

In 2020, Mohammadabad-e Sharqi was separated from the district in the formation of Abkuh District and transferred to Dughayi Rural District in the new district.
