= Hesar, Quchan =

Village in Razavi Khorasan province, Iran

Hesar Persian: حصار
- Village
- Location within Iran
- Coordinates: 36°50′02″N 58°40′39″E
- Country: Iran
- Province: Razavi Khorasan
- County: Quchan
- District: Abkuh
- Rural District: Bahar

Population (2016)
  - Total: 115
- Time zone: UTC+3:30 (IRST)

Hesar (Persian: حصار) (Note: Also romanized as Ḩeşār; also known as Ḩeşār-e Ḩājjī Allā Verdī) is a village in Bahar Rural District of Abkuh District in Quchan County, Razavi Khorasan province, Iran.

== Demographics ==
=== Population ===
At the time of the 2006 National Census, the village's population was 169 in 47 households, when it was in Dughayi Rural District of the Central District. The following census in 2011 counted 162 people in 46 households. The 2016 census measured the population of the village as 115 people in 39 households.

In 2020, the rural district was separated from the district in the formation of Abkuh District, and Hesar was transferred to Bahar Rural District created in the new district.
