= Ab Gorg =

Village in Razavi Khorasan province, Iran

Ab Gorg Persian: ابگرگ
- Village
- Location within Iran
- Coordinates: 36°58′37″N 58°31′36″E
- Country: Iran
- Province: Razavi Khorasan
- County: Quchan
- District: Abkuh
- Rural District: Dughayi

Population (2016)
  - Total: 287
- Time zone: UTC+3:30 (IRST)

Ab Gorg (Persian: ابگرگ) (Note: Also romanized as Āb Gorg; also known as Āb Gorg-e Bālā, Āb Gorg-e ‘Olyā, and Āb-i-Gurg) is a village in Dughayi Rural District of Abkuh District in Quchan County, Razavi Khorasan province, Iran.

== Demographics ==
=== Population ===
At the time of the 2006 National Census, the village's population was 445 in 106 households, when it was in Sudlaneh Rural District of the Central District. The following census in 2011 counted 316 people in 89 households. The 2016 census measured the population of the village as 287 people in 105 households.

In 2020, Ab Gorg was separated from the district in the formation of Abkuh District and transferred to Dughayi Rural District in the new district.
