= Shafi, Iran =

Village in Razavi Khorasan province, Iran

Shafi Persian: شفيع
- Village
- Location within Iran
- Coordinates: 36°48′54″N 58°46′11″E
- Country: Iran
- Province: Razavi Khorasan
- County: Quchan
- District: Abkuh
- Rural District: Bahar

Population (2016)
  - Total: 1,343
- Time zone: UTC+3:30 (IRST)

Shafi (Persian: شفيع) (Note: Also romanized as Shafī‘ and Shaf‘i) is a village in, and the capital of, Bahar Rural District in Abkuh District of Quchan County, Razavi Khorasan province, Iran.

== Demographics ==
=== Population ===
At the time of the 2006 National Census, the village's population was 1,268 in 304 households, when it was in Dughayi Rural District of the Central District. The following census in 2011 counted 1,537 people in 439 households. The 2016 census measured the population of the village as 1,343 people in 412 households.

In 2020, the rural district was separated from the district in the formation of Abkuh District, and Shafi was transferred to Bahar Rural District created in the new district.
