= Davodli =

Village in Razavi Khorasan province, Iran

Davodli Persian: داودلي
- Village
- Location within Iran
- Coordinates: 37°00′50″N 58°39′17″E
- Country: Iran
- Province: Razavi Khorasan
- County: Quchan
- District: Abkuh
- Rural District: Dughayi

Population (2016)
  - Total: 659
- Time zone: UTC+3:30 (IRST)

Davodli (Persian: داودلي) (Note: Also romanized as Dāvodlī; also known as Dāvūdlī) is a village in Dughayi Rural District of Abkuh District in Quchan County, Razavi Khorasan province, Iran.

== Demographics ==
=== Population ===
At the time of the 2006 National Census, the village's population was 971 in 258 households, when it was in Sudlaneh Rural District of the Central District. The following census in 2011 counted 910 people in 280 households. The 2016 census measured the population of the village as 659 people in 221 households.

In 2020, Davodli was separated from the district in the formation of Abkuh District and transferred to Dughayi Rural District in the new district.
