= Qeshlaq, Quchan =

Village in Razavi Khorasan province, Iran

Qeshlaq Persian: قشلاق
- Village
- Location within Iran
- Country: Iran
- Province: Razavi Khorasan
- County: Quchan
- District: Abkuh
- Rural District: Dughayi

Population (2016)
  - Total: 43
- Time zone: UTC+3:30 (IRST)

Qeshlaq (Persian: قشلاق) (Note: Also romanized as Qeshlāq) is a village in Dughayi Rural District of Abkuh District in Quchan County, Razavi Khorasan province, Iran.

== Demographics ==
=== Population ===
At the time of the 2006 National Census, the village's population was 52 in 13 households, when it was in Sudlaneh Rural District of the Central District. The following census in 2011 counted 42 people in 11 households. The 2016 census measured the population of the village as 43 people in 14 households.

In 2020, Qeshlaq was separated from the district in the formation of Abkuh District and transferred to Dughayi Rural District in the new district.
