= Yengeh Qaleh-ye Havadanlu =

Village in Razavi Khorasan province, Iran

Yengeh Qaleh-ye Havadanlu Persian: ينگه قلعه هودانلو
- Village
- Location within Iran
- Coordinates: 36°59′11″N 58°28′53″E
- Country: Iran
- Province: Razavi Khorasan
- County: Quchan
- District: Abkuh
- Rural District: Dughayi

Population (2016)
  - Total: 448
- Time zone: UTC+3:30 (IRST)

Yengeh Qaleh-ye Havadanlu (Persian: ينگه قلعه هودانلو) (Note: Also romanized as Yengeh Qal‘eh-ye Havadānlū) is a village in Dughayi Rural District of Abkuh District in Quchan County, Razavi Khorasan province, Iran.

== Demographics ==
=== Population ===
At the time of the 2006 National Census, the village's population was 526 in 126 households, when it was in Sudlaneh Rural District of the Central District. The following census in 2011 counted 419 people in 116 households. The 2016 census measured the population of the village as 448 people in 140 households.

In 2020, Yengeh Qaleh-ye Havadanlu was separated from the district in the formation of Abkuh District and transferred to Dughayi Rural District in the new district.
