= Maqsudabad, Quchan =

Village in Razavi Khorasan province, Iran

Maqsudabad Persian: مقصوداباد
- Village
- Location within Iran
- Coordinates: 36°48′10″N 58°52′43″E
- Country: Iran
- Province: Razavi Khorasan
- County: Quchan
- District: Abkuh
- Rural District: Bahar

Population (2016)
  - Total: 677
- Time zone: UTC+3:30 (IRST)

Maqsudabad (Persian: مقصوداباد) (Note: Also romanized as Maqşūdābād; also known as ‘Eşmatābād, ‘Ismatābād, and Maqşūdābād-e Bāla) is a village in Bahar Rural District of Abkuh District in Quchan County, Razavi Khorasan province, Iran.

== Demographics ==
=== Population ===
At the time of the 2006 National Census, the village's population was 903 in 210 households, when it was in Dughayi Rural District of the Central District. The following census in 2011 counted 824 people in 221 households. The 2016 census measured the population of the village as 677 people in 226 households.

In 2020, the rural district was separated from the district in the formation of Abkuh District, and Maqsudabad was transferred to Bahar Rural District created in the new district.
