= Beyg Nazar =

Village in Razavi Khorasan province, Iran

Beyg Nazar Persian: بيگ نظر
- Village
- Location within Iran
- Coordinates: 36°54′29″N 58°44′04″E
- Country: Iran
- Province: Razavi Khorasan
- County: Quchan
- District: Abkuh
- Rural District: Bahar

Population (2016)
  - Total: 890
- Time zone: UTC+3:30 (IRST)

Beyg Nazar (Persian: بيگ نظر) (Note: Also romanized as Beyg Naz̧ar; also known as Beyk Naz̧ar) is a village in Bahar Rural District of Abkuh District in Quchan County, Razavi Khorasan province, Iran.

== Demographics ==
=== Population ===
At the time of the 2006 National Census, the village's population was 969 in 228 households, when it was in Dughayi Rural District of the Central District. The following census in 2011 counted 843 people in 260 households. The 2016 census measured the population of the village as 890 people in 262 households.

In 2020, the rural district was separated from the district in the formation of Abkuh District, and Beyg Nazar was transferred to Bahar Rural District created in the new district.
