= Kallar, Razavi Khorasan =

Village in Razavi Khorasan province, Iran

Kallar Persian: كلر
- Village
- Location within Iran
- Country: Iran
- Province: Razavi Khorasan
- County: Quchan
- District: Abkuh
- Rural District: Dughayi

Population (2016)
  - Total: 128
- Time zone: UTC+3:30 (IRST)

Kallar (Persian: كلر) is a village in Dughayi Rural District of Abkuh District in Quchan County, Razavi Khorasan province, Iran.

== Demographics ==
=== Population ===
At the time of the 2006 National Census, the village's population was 268 in 58 households, when it was in Sudlaneh Rural District of the Central District. The following census in 2011 counted 189 people in 43 households. The 2016 census measured the population of the village as 128 people in 47 households.

In 2020, Kallar was separated from the district in the formation of Abkuh District and transferred to Dughayi Rural District in the new district.
