= Chahar Suq, Razavi Khorasan =

Village in Razavi Khorasan province, Iran

Chahar Suq Persian: چهارسوق
- Village
- Location within Iran
- Coordinates: 36°46′16″N 58°39′12″E
- Country: Iran
- Province: Razavi Khorasan
- County: Quchan
- District: Abkuh
- Rural District: Bahar

Population (2016)
  - Total: 12
- Time zone: UTC+3:30 (IRST)

Chahar Suq (Persian: چهارسوق) (Note: Also romanized as Chahār Sūq) is a village in Bahar Rural District of Abkuh District in Quchan County, Razavi Khorasan province, Iran.

== Demographics ==
=== Population ===
At the time of the 2006 National Census, the village's population was 16 in seven households, when it was in Dughayi Rural District of the Central District. The following census in 2011 counted 34 people in nine households. The 2016 census measured the population of the village as 12 people in six households.

In 2020, the rural district was separated from the district in the formation of Abkuh District, and Chahar Suq was transferred to Bahar Rural District created in the new district.
