= Eslamabad, Quchan =

Village in Razavi Khorasan province, Iran

Eslamabad Persian: اسلام اباد
- Village
- Location within Iran
- Coordinates: 36°59′25″N 58°33′24″E
- Country: Iran
- Province: Razavi Khorasan
- County: Quchan
- District: Abkuh
- Rural District: Dughayi

Population (2016)
  - Total: 340
- Time zone: UTC+3:30 (IRST)

Eslamabad (Persian: اسلام اباد) (Note: Also romanized as Eslāmābād; also known as Gabrābād (گبراباد) and Gīrābād) is a village in Dughayi Rural District of Abkuh District in Quchan County, Razavi Khorasan province, Iran.

== Demographics ==
=== Population ===
At the time of the 2006 National Census, the village's population was 604 in 122 households, when it was in Sudlaneh Rural District of the Central District. The following census in 2011 counted 521 people in 123 households. The 2016 census measured the population of the village as 340 people in 114 households.

In 2020, Eslamabad was separated from the district in the formation of Abkuh District and transferred to Dughayi Rural District in the new district.
