= Shirzan =

Shirzan شيرزن
- Village
- Location within Iran
- Coordinates: 37°20′25″N 58°22′05″E
- Country: Iran
- Province: Razavi Khorasan
- County: Quchan
- Bakhsh: Bajgiran
- Rural District: Dowlatkhaneh

Population (2006)
  - Total: 225
- Time zone: UTC+3:30 (IRST)
  - Summer (DST): UTC+4:30 (IRDT)

Shirzan (Persian: شيرزن, also Romanized as Shīrzan; also known as Shīreh Zān and Sinkeh Zan) is a village in Dowlatkhaneh Rural District, Bajgiran District, Quchan County, Razavi Khorasan Province, Iran. At the 2006 census, its population was 225, in 47 families.
