= Kalateh-ye Reza Khan =

Village in Razavi Khorasan province, Iran

Kalateh-ye Reza Khan Persian: كلاته رضاخان
- Village
- Location within Iran
- Coordinates: 36°54′11″N 58°32′03″E
- Country: Iran
- Province: Razavi Khorasan
- County: Quchan
- District: Abkuh
- Rural District: Dughayi

Population (2016)
  - Total: 99
- Time zone: UTC+3:30 (IRST)

Kalateh-ye Reza Khan (Persian: كلاته رضاخان) (Note: Also romanized as Kalāteh-ye Reẕā Khān and Kalāteh-ye Rezā Khān; also known as Kalāteh and Kalāteh-ye Yūsef (كلاته يوسف)) is a village in Dughayi Rural District of Abkuh District in Quchan County, Razavi Khorasan province, Iran.

== Demographics ==
=== Population ===
At the time of the 2006 National Census, the village's population was 144 in 37 households, when it was in the Central District. The following census in 2011 counted 118 people in 40 households. The 2016 census measured the population of the village as 99 people in 38 households.

In 2020, the rural district was separated from the district in the formation of Abkuh District.
