= Dor Badam =

Dor Badam دربادام
- Village
- Location within Iran
- Coordinates: 37°29′41″N 58°27′34″E
- Country: Iran
- Province: Razavi Khorasan
- County: Quchan
- Bakhsh: Bajgiran
- Rural District: Dowlatkhaneh

Population (2006)
  - Total: 286
- Time zone: UTC+3:30 (IRST)
  - Summer (DST): UTC+4:30 (IRDT)

Dor Badam (Persian: دربادام, also Romanized as Dor Bādām and Durb Ādam) is a village in Dowlatkhaneh Rural District, Bajgiran District, Quchan County, Razavi Khorasan Province, Iran. At the 2006 census, its population was 286, in 70 families.
