= Kalateh-ye Malu =

Village in Razavi Khorasan province, Iran

Kalateh-ye Malu Persian: كلاته ملو
- Village
- Location within Iran
- Coordinates: 36°50′37″N 58°33′45″E
- Country: Iran
- Province: Razavi Khorasan
- County: Quchan
- District: Abkuh
- Rural District: Dughayi

Population (2016)
  - Total: 279
- Time zone: UTC+3:30 (IRST)

Kalateh-ye Malu (Persian: كلاته ملو) (Note: Also romanized as Kalāteh-ye Malū) is a village in Dughayi Rural District of Abkuh District in Quchan County, Razavi Khorasan province, Iran.

== Demographics ==
=== Population ===
At the time of the 2006 National Census, the village's population was 281 in 68 households, when it was in the Central District. The following census in 2011 counted 191 people in 60 households. The 2016 census measured the population of the village as 279 people in 94 households.

In 2020, the rural district was separated from the district in the formation of Abkuh District.
