= Qarah Jeqqeh, Razavi Khorasan =

Village in Razavi Khorasan province, Iran

Qarah Jeqqeh Persian: قره جقه
- Village
- Location within Iran
- Coordinates: 37°00′32″N 58°40′55″E
- Country: Iran
- Province: Razavi Khorasan
- County: Quchan
- District: Abkuh
- Rural District: Dughayi

Population (2016)
  - Total: 53
- Time zone: UTC+3:30 (IRST)

Qarah Jeqqeh (Persian: قره جقه) (Note: Also romanized as Qareh Jaqqeh and Qareh Jeqqeh) is a village in Dughayi Rural District of Abkuh District in Quchan County, Razavi Khorasan province, Iran.

== Demographics ==
=== Population ===
At the time of the 2006 National Census, the village's population was 80 in 21 households, when it was in Sudlaneh Rural District of the Central District. The following census in 2011 counted 59 people in 16 households. The 2016 census measured the population of the village as 53 people in 18 households.

In 2020, Qarah Jeqqeh was separated from the district in the formation of Abkuh District and transferred to Dughayi Rural District in the new district.
