= Asi Bolagh =

Asi Bolagh اسيبلاغ
- Village
- Location within Iran
- Coordinates: 37°18′44″N 58°27′47″E
- Country: Iran
- Province: Razavi Khorasan
- County: Quchan
- Bakhsh: Bajgiran
- Rural District: Dowlatkhaneh

Population (2006)
  - Total: 106
- Time zone: UTC+3:30 (IRST)
  - Summer (DST): UTC+4:30 (IRDT)

Asi Bolagh (Persian: اسيبلاغ, also Romanized as Āsī Bolāgh) is a village in Dowlatkhaneh Rural District, Bajgiran District, Quchan County, Razavi Khorasan Province, Iran. At the 2006 census, its population was 106, in 21 families.

== See also ==
- List of cities, towns and villages in Razavi Khorasan Province
