= Chun Li (disambiguation) =

Chun-Li is a video game character from the Street Fighter series. Chunli or Chun Li or Chun-Li or variant may also refer to:

== People ==
=== Given name "Chunli" ===
- Bai Chunli (born 1953), Chinese chemist
- Chen Chun-li (1911–1969), Chinese actor and director
- Gu Chunli (born 1957), Chinese politician
- Kang Chun Li (847–894), general of Tang Dynasty China
- Jiang Chunli (born 1981), Chinese crosscountry skier
- Chunli Li (born 1962), Chinese-born New Zealand table tennis player
- Lu Chunli, Chinese Paralympian volleyballer
- Song Chunli (born 1951), Chinese actress
- Wang Chunli (born 1983), Chinese biathlete
- Wu Chun-li (born 1962), Taiwanese politician
- Zhao Chunli, a suspect in a January 2023 mass shooting in Half Moon Bay, California, USA

=== Given name "Chun" surname "Li" ===
- Li Chun (warlord) (1867–1920), Chinese general
- Li Chun (actress) (born 1988), Chinese actress
- Li Zhun (1928–2000), Chinese writer, formerly romanized as Li Chun
- Li Qinyao (born 1988), birth name Li Chun, Chinese actress
- Mason Lee (born 1990; Chinese name 李淳, Li Chun), Taiwanese-American actor
- Emperor Xianzong of Tang (778–820), personal name Li Chun, emperor of the Tang dynasty

== Other ==
- "Chun-Li" (song), a 2018 song by Nicki Minaj
- Chunli, Iran; a village in Dowlatkhaneh Rural District, Bajgiran District, Razavi Khorasan Province

== See also ==
- SS Chun Lee, a cargo ship that started out as a U.S. WWII Victory Ship
- Li Chun (disambiguation)
- Chun (disambiguation)
- Li (disambiguation)
