= Gol Mim =

Village in Razavi Khorasan province, Iran

Gol Mim Persian: گلميم
- Village
- Location within Iran
- Coordinates: 36°52′23″N 58°30′35″E
- Country: Iran
- Province: Razavi Khorasan
- County: Quchan
- District: Abkuh
- Rural District: Dughayi

Population (2016)
  - Total: 298
- Time zone: UTC+3:30 (IRST)

Gol Mim (Persian: گلميم) (Note: Also romanized as Gol Meym and Gol Mīm) is a village in Dughayi Rural District of Abkuh District in Quchan County, Razavi Khorasan province, Iran.

== Demographics ==
=== Population ===
At the time of the 2006 National Census, the village's population was 403 in 121 households, when it was in the Central District. The following census in 2011 counted 329 people in 114 households. The 2016 census measured the population of the village as 298 people in 111 households.

In 2020, the rural district was separated from the district in the formation of Abkuh District.
