= Kheyrabad-e Sharqi =

Village in Razavi Khorasan province, Iran

Kheyrabad-e Sharqi Persian: خيرابادشرقي
- Village
- Location within Iran
- Coordinates: 36°57′27″N 58°40′33″E
- Country: Iran
- Province: Razavi Khorasan
- County: Quchan
- District: Abkuh
- Rural District: Dughayi

Population (2016)
  - Total: 37
- Time zone: UTC+3:30 (IRST)

Kheyrabad-e Sharqi (Persian: خيرابادشرقي) (Note: Also romanized as Kheyrābād-e Sharqī; also known as Āb Dīvāneh and Kheyrābād) is a village in Dughayi Rural District of Abkuh District in Quchan County, Razavi Khorasan province, Iran.

== Demographics ==
=== Population ===
At the time of the 2006 National Census, the village's population was 40 in 11 households, when it was in the Central District. The following census in 2011 counted 24 people in eight households. The 2016 census measured the population of the village as 37 people in 14 households.

In 2020, the rural district was separated from the district in the formation of Abkuh District.
