= Sarzow =

Sarzow سرزو
- Village
- Location within Iran
- Coordinates: 37°13′59″N 58°41′48″E
- Country: Iran
- Province: Razavi Khorasan
- County: Quchan
- Bakhsh: Central
- Rural District: Shirin Darreh

Population (2006)
  - Total: 69
- Time zone: UTC+3:30 (IRST)
  - Summer (DST): UTC+4:30 (IRDT)

Sarzow (Persian: سرزو, also Romanized as Sar Zū) is a village in Shirin Darreh Rural District, in the Central District of Quchan County, Razavi Khorasan Province, Iran. At the 2006 census, its population was 69, in 16 families.
