= Gol Mokharan =

Village in Razavi Khorasan province, Iran

Gol Mokharan Persian: گل مخاران
- Village
- Location within Iran
- Coordinates: 36°56′13″N 58°26′14″E
- Country: Iran
- Province: Razavi Khorasan
- County: Quchan
- District: Abkuh
- Rural District: Dughayi

Population (2016)
  - Total: 70
- Time zone: UTC+3:30 (IRST)

Gol Mokharan (Persian: گل مخاران) (Note: Also romanized as Gol Mokhārān and Golmokhrān; also known as Kalamkhvārān) is a village in Dughayi Rural District of Abkuh District in Quchan County, Razavi Khorasan province, Iran.

== Demographics ==
=== Population ===
At the time of the 2006 National Census, the village's population was 117 in 31 households, when it was in the Central District. The following census in 2011 counted 100 people in 29 households. The 2016 census measured the population of the village as 70 people in 26 households.

In 2020, the rural district was separated from the district in the formation of Abkuh District.
