= Qarjqah =

Coordinates: 37°40′N 58°19′E

Qarjqah قرجقه
- Village
- Interactive map of Qarjqah
- Country: Iran
- Province: Razavi Khorasan
- County: Quchan
- Bakhsh: Bajgiran
- Rural District: Dowlatkhaneh

Population (2006)
  - Total: 204
- Time zone: UTC+3:30 (IRST)
  - Summer (DST): UTC+4:30 (IRDT)

Qarjqah (Persian: قرجقه) is a village in Dowlatkhaneh Rural District, Bajgiran District, Quchan County, Razavi Khorasan Province, Iran. At the 2006 census, its population was 204, in 47 families.
