= Borselan =

Village in Razavi Khorasan province, Iran

Borselan Persian: برسلان
- Village
- Location within Iran
- Coordinates: 36°55′41″N 58°29′28″E
- Country: Iran
- Province: Razavi Khorasan
- County: Quchan
- District: Abkuh
- Rural District: Dughayi

Population (2016)
  - Total: 271
- Time zone: UTC+3:30 (IRST)

Borselan (Persian: برسلان) (Note: Also romanized as Borselān; also known as Borselān-e ‘Olyā) is a village in Dughayi Rural District of Abkuh District in Quchan County, Razavi Khorasan province, Iran.

== Demographics ==
=== Population ===
At the time of the 2006 National Census, the village's population was 391 in 110 households, when it was in the Central District. The following census in 2011 counted 309 people in 100 households. The 2016 census measured the population of the village as 271 people in 103 households.

In 2020, the rural district was separated from the district in the formation of Abkuh District.
