= Golshanabad =

Golshanabad (Persian: گلشن اباد) may refer to:

- Golshanabad, Aran va Bidgol, Isfahan Province
- Golshanabad, Tiran and Karvan, Isfahan Province
- Golshanabad, Markazi
- Golshanabad, Chenaran, Razavi Khorasan Province
- Golshanabad, Firuzeh, Razavi Khorasan Province
- Golshanabad, Joghatai, Razavi Khorasan Province
- Golshanabad, Quchan, Razavi Khorasan Province

== See also ==
- Gulshanabad (disambiguation)
