= Ab Barg =

Ab Barg اب برگ
- Village
- Location within Iran
- Coordinates: 37°06′52″N 58°33′54″E
- Country: Iran
- Province: Razavi Khorasan
- County: Quchan
- Bakhsh: Central
- Rural District: Shirin Darreh

Population (2006)
  - Total: 35
- Time zone: UTC+3:30 (IRST)
  - Summer (DST): UTC+4:30 (IRDT)

Ab Barg (Persian: اب برگ, also Romanized as Āb Barg) is a village in Shirin Darreh Rural District, in the Central District of Quchan County, Razavi Khorasan province, Iran. At the 2006 census, its population was 35 in 7 families.

== See also ==
- List of cities, towns and villages in Razavi Khorasan province
