= Tavakkol Bagh =

Village in Razavi Khorasan province, Iran

Tavakkol Bagh Persian: توكل باغ
- Village
- Country: Iran
- Province: Razavi Khorasan
- County: Quchan
- District: Abkuh
- Rural District: Dughayi

Population (2016)
  - Total: 27
- Time zone: UTC+3:30 (IRST)

Tavakkol Bagh (Persian: توكل باغ) (Note: Also romanized as Tavakkol Bāgh; also known as Tukla Bagh and Tūḵla Bāgh) is a village in Dughayi Rural District of Abkuh District in Quchan County, Razavi Khorasan province, Iran.

== Demographics ==
=== Population ===
At the time of the 2006 National Census, the village's population was 32 in nine households, when it was in the Central District. The following census in 2011 counted 25 people in eight households. The 2016 census measured the population of the village as 27 people in 10 households.

In 2020, the rural district was separated from the district in the formation of Abkuh District.
