= Dowlatkhaneh =

Dowlatkhaneh دولت خانه
- Village
- Location within Iran
- Coordinates: 37°17′08″N 58°27′30″E
- Country: Iran
- Province: Razavi Khorasan
- County: Quchan
- Bakhsh: Bajgiran
- Rural District: Dowlatkhaneh

Population (2006)
  - Total: 237
- Time zone: UTC+3:30 (IRST)
  - Summer (DST): UTC+4:30 (IRDT)

Dowlatkhaneh (Persian: دولت خانه, also Romanized as Dowlatkhāneh, Dowlat Khāneh and Daulat Khāneh) is a village in Dowlatkhaneh Rural District, Bajgiran District, Quchan County, Razavi Khorasan Province, Iran. At the 2006 census, its population was 237, in 59 families.
