= Pish Baghan =

Pish Baghan پيش باغان
- Village
- Location within Iran
- Coordinates: 37°06′13″N 58°34′02″E
- Country: Iran
- Province: Razavi Khorasan
- County: Quchan
- Bakhsh: Central
- Rural District: Shirin Darreh

Population (2006)
  - Total: 110
- Time zone: UTC+3:30 (IRST)
  - Summer (DST): UTC+4:30 (IRDT)

Pish Baghan (Persian: پيش باغان, also Romanized as Pīsh Bāghān; also known as Besh Bāghān) is a village in Shirin Darreh Rural District, in the Central District of Quchan County, Razavi Khorasan Province, Iran. At the 2006 census, its population was 110, in 25 families.
