= Besh Aghaj =

Village in Razavi Khorasan province, Iran

Besh Aghaj Persian: بش اغاج
- Village
- Location within Iran
- Coordinates: 36°52′59″N 58°31′33″E
- Country: Iran
- Province: Razavi Khorasan
- County: Quchan
- District: Abkuh
- Rural District: Dughayi

Population (2016)
  - Total: 250
- Time zone: UTC+3:30 (IRST)

Besh Aghaj (Persian: بش اغاج) (Note: Also romanized as Besh Āghāj; also known as Besh Āqāj and Bīsh Āghāch) is a village in Dughayi Rural District of Abkuh District in Quchan County, Razavi Khorasan province, Iran.

== Demographics ==
=== Population ===
At the time of the 2006 National Census, the village's population was 351 in 97 households, when it was in the Central District. The following census in 2011 counted 234 people in 87 households. The 2016 census measured the population of the village as 250 people in 100 households.

In 2020, the rural district was separated from the district in the formation of Abkuh District.
