= Incheh Keykanlu =

Incheh Keykanlu اينچه كيكانلو
- Village
- Location within Iran
- Coordinates: 37°20′28″N 58°36′57″E
- Country: Iran
- Province: Razavi Khorasan
- County: Quchan
- Bakhsh: Bajgiran
- Rural District: Dowlatkhaneh

Population (2006)
  - Total: 521
- Time zone: UTC+3:30 (IRST)
  - Summer (DST): UTC+4:30 (IRDT)

Incheh Keykanlu (Persian: اينچه كيكانلو, also Romanized as Īncheh Keykānlū) is a village in Dowlatkhaneh Rural District, Bajgiran District, Quchan County, Razavi Khorasan Province, Iran. At the 2006 census, its population was 521, in 141 families.
