= Qarah Chay, Razavi Khorasan =

Village in Razavi Khorasan province, Iran

Qarah Chay Persian: قره چاي
- Village
- Location within Iran
- Coordinates: 36°51′47″N 58°39′28″E
- Country: Iran
- Province: Razavi Khorasan
- County: Quchan
- District: Abkuh
- Rural District: Dughayi

Population (2016)
  - Total: 176
- Time zone: UTC+3:30 (IRST)

Qarah Chay (Persian: قره چاي) (Note: Also romanized as Qarah Chāy; also known as Qarah Chāh and Qareh Chāh) is a village in Dughayi Rural District of Abkuh District in Quchan County, Razavi Khorasan province, Iran.

== Demographics ==
=== Population ===
At the time of the 2006 National Census, the village's population was 155 in 38 households, when it was in the Central District. The following census in 2011 counted 142 people in 37 households. The 2016 census measured the population of the village as 176 people in 54 households.

In 2020, the rural district was separated from the district in the formation of Abkuh District.
