= Chah Ab =

Chah Ab or Chahab (Persian: چاه اب or چهاب) may refer to:

- Chah Ab District (چاه اب - Chāh Āb), Afghanistan
- Chahab, Fars (چاه اب - Chāhāb), Iran
- Chahab, Kohgiluyeh and Boyer-Ahmad (چهاب - Chahāb), Iran
- Chah Ab, Razavi Khorasan (چاه اب - Chāh Āb), Iran
