= Zu Khanu =

Zu Khanu زوخانو
- Village
- Location within Iran
- Coordinates: 37°09′18″N 58°41′37″E
- Country: Iran
- Province: Razavi Khorasan
- County: Quchan
- Bakhsh: Central
- Rural District: Shirin Darreh

Population (2006)
  - Total: 198
- Time zone: UTC+3:30 (IRST)
  - Summer (DST): UTC+4:30 (IRDT)

Zu Khanu (Persian: زوخانو, also Romanized as Zū Khānū) is a village in Shirin Darreh Rural District, in the Central District of Quchan County, Razavi Khorasan Province, Iran. At the 2006 census, its population was 198, in 52 families.
