= Dughayi =

Village in Razavi Khorasan province, Iran

Dughayi Persian: دوغائي
- Village
- Location within Iran
- Coordinates: 36°54′44″N 58°34′55″E
- Country: Iran
- Province: Razavi Khorasan
- County: Quchan
- District: Abkuh
- Rural District: Dughayi

Population (2016)
  - Total: 1,128
- Time zone: UTC+3:30 (IRST)

Dughayi (Persian: دوغائي) (Note: Also romanized as Dowghā’ī, Dughai, and Dūghāyī; also known as Doqā’ī, Dowqā’ī, and Dūghānī) is a village in, and the capital of, Dughayi Rural District in Abkuh District of Quchan County, Razavi Khorasan province, Iran. The previous capital of the rural district was the village of Almajeq, now a city.

== Demographics ==
=== Population ===
At the time of the 2006 National Census, the village's population was 1,086 in 297 households, when it was in the Central District. The following census in 2011 counted 1,106 people in 293 households. The 2016 census measured the population of the village as 1,128 people in 347 households, the most populous in its rural district.

In 2020, the rural district was separated from the district in the formation of Abkuh District.
