= Golshanabad, Quchan =

Village in Razavi Khorasan province, Iran

Golshanabad Persian: گلشن اباد
- Village
- Location within Iran
- Coordinates: 36°48′37″N 58°38′02″E
- Country: Iran
- Province: Razavi Khorasan
- County: Quchan
- District: Abkuh
- Rural District: Bahar

Population (2016)
  - Total: 40
- Time zone: UTC+3:30 (IRST)

Golshanabad (Persian: گلشن اباد) (Note: Also romanized as Golshanābād; also known as Shādābeh) is a village in Bahar Rural District of Abkuh District in Quchan County, Razavi Khorasan province, Iran.

== Demographics ==
=== Population ===
At the time of the 2006 National Census, the village's population was 89 in 28 households, when it was in Dughayi Rural District of the Central District. The following census in 2011 counted 74 people in 23 households. The 2016 census measured the population of the village as 40 people in 14 households.

In 2020, the rural district was separated from the district in the formation of Abkuh District, and Golshanabad was transferred to Bahar Rural District created in the new district.
