= Kalateh-ye Azim =

Village in Razavi Khorasan province, Iran

Kalateh-ye Azim Persian: كلاته عظيم
- Village
- Location within Iran
- Country: Iran
- Province: Razavi Khorasan
- County: Quchan
- District: Abkuh
- Rural District: Dughayi

Population (2016)
  - Total: 17
- Time zone: UTC+3:30 (IRST)

Kalateh-ye Azim (Persian: كلاته عظيم) (Note: Also romanized as Kalāteh-ye ‘Az̧īm; also known as Kalāteh-ye Nowbahār (كلاته نوبهار)) is a village in Dughayi Rural District of Abkuh District in Quchan County, Razavi Khorasan province, Iran.

== Demographics ==
=== Population ===
At the time of the 2006 National Census, the village's population was 23 in seven households, when it was in the Central District. The following census in 2011 counted 22 people in seven households. The 2016 census measured the population of the village as 17 people in eight households.

In 2020, the rural district was separated from the district in the formation of Abkuh District.
