= Sheykh Kanlu, Quchan =

Sheykh Kanlu شيخكانلو
- Village
- Location within Iran
- Coordinates: 37°29′05″N 58°24′32″E
- Country: Iran
- Province: Razavi Khorasan
- County: Quchan
- Bakhsh: Bajgiran
- Rural District: Dowlatkhaneh

Population (2006)
  - Total: 104
- Time zone: UTC+3:30 (IRST)
  - Summer (DST): UTC+4:30 (IRDT)

Sheykh Kanlu (Persian: شيخكانلو, also Romanized as Sheykh Kānlū) is a village in Dowlatkhaneh Rural District, Bajgiran District, Quchan County, Razavi Khorasan Province, Iran. At the 2006 census, its population was 104, in 26 families.
