= Incheh Shahbaz =

Incheh Shahbaz اينچه شهباز
- Village
- Location within Iran
- Coordinates: 37°22′02″N 58°33′34″E
- Country: Iran
- Province: Razavi Khorasan
- County: Quchan
- Bakhsh: Bajgiran
- Rural District: Dowlatkhaneh

Population (2006)
  - Total: 110
- Time zone: UTC+3:30 (IRST)
  - Summer (DST): UTC+4:30 (IRDT)

Incheh Shahbaz (Persian: اينچه شهباز, also Romanized as Īncheh Shāhbāz) is a village in Dowlatkhaneh Rural District, Bajgiran District, Quchan County, Razavi Khorasan Province, Iran. At the 2006 census, its population was 110, in 28 families.
