= Qareh Cheh =

Qareh Cheh قره چه
- Village
- Location within Iran
- Coordinates: 37°21′27″N 58°19′37″E
- Country: Iran
- Province: Razavi Khorasan
- County: Quchan
- Bakhsh: Bajgiran
- Rural District: Dowlatkhaneh

Population (2006)
  - Total: 247
- Time zone: UTC+3:30 (IRST)
  - Summer (DST): UTC+4:30 (IRDT)

Qareh Cheh (Persian: قره چه; also known as Daracheh) is a village in Dowlatkhaneh Rural District, Bajgiran District, Quchan County, Razavi Khorasan Province, Iran. At the 2006 census, its population was 247, in 66 families.
