= Atarchi =

Village in Razavi Khorasan province, Iran

Atarchi Persian: اطارچي
- Village
- Country: Iran
- Province: Razavi Khorasan
- County: Quchan
- District: Abkuh
- Rural District: Dughayi

Population (2016)
  - Total: 14
- Time zone: UTC+3:30 (IRST)

Atarchi (Persian: اطارچي) (Note: Also romanized as Āṭārchī) is a village in Dughayi Rural District of Abkuh District in Quchan County, Razavi Khorasan province, Iran.

== Demographics ==
=== Population ===
At the time of the 2006 National Census, the village's population was 23 in seven households, when it was in the Central District. The following census in 2011 counted a population below the reporting threshold. The 2016 census measured the population of the village as 14 people in four households.

In 2020, the rural district was separated from the district in the formation of Abkuh District.
