= Qariyeh Sharaf =

Qariyeh Sharaf قريه شرف
- Village
- Country: Iran
- Province: Razavi Khorasan
- County: Quchan
- Bakhsh: Bajgiran
- Rural District: Dowlatkhaneh

Population (2006)
  - Total: 320
- Time zone: UTC+3:30 (IRST)
  - Summer (DST): UTC+4:30 (IRDT)

Qariyeh Sharaf (Persian: قريه شرف, also Romanized as Qarīyeh Sharaf) is a village in Dowlatkhaneh Rural District, Bajgiran District, Quchan County, Razavi Khorasan Province, Iran. At the 2006 census, its population was 320, in 82 families.
