= Shoghlabad, Razavi Khorasan =

Village in Razavi Khorasan province, Iran

Shoghlabad Persian: شغل اباد
- Village
- Location within Iran
- Coordinates: 36°50′28″N 58°42′00″E
- Country: Iran
- Province: Razavi Khorasan
- County: Quchan
- District: Abkuh
- Rural District: Bahar

Population (2016)
  - Total: 207
- Time zone: UTC+3:30 (IRST)

Shoghlabad (Persian: شغل اباد) (Note: Also romanized as Shaghlābād and Shoghlābād; also known as Shoql Ābād and Shughlābād) is a village in Bahar Rural District of Abkuh District in Quchan County, Razavi Khorasan province, Iran.

== Demographics ==
=== Population ===
At the time of the 2006 National Census, the village's population was 303 in 97 households, when it was in Dughayi Rural District of the Central District. The following census in 2011 counted 58 people in 21 households. The 2016 census measured the population of the village as 207 people in 70 households.

In 2020, the rural district was separated from the district in the formation of Abkuh District, and Shoghlabad was transferred to Bahar Rural District created in the new district.
