= Hamzeh Kanlu =

Hamzeh Kanlu حمزه كانلو
- Village
- Location within Iran
- Coordinates: 37°30′20″N 58°20′50″E
- Country: Iran
- Province: Razavi Khorasan
- County: Quchan
- Bakhsh: Bajgiran
- Rural District: Dowlatkhaneh

Population (2006)
  - Total: 92
- Time zone: UTC+3:30 (IRST)
  - Summer (DST): UTC+4:30 (IRDT)

Hamzeh Kanlu (Persian: حمزه كانلو, also Romanized as Ḩamzeh Kānlū; also known as Ḩamzeh Kānlū-ye Bālā and Ḩamzeh Kānlū-ye ‘Olyā) is a village in Dowlatkhaneh Rural District, Bajgiran District, Quchan County, Razavi Khorasan Province, Iran. At the 2006 census, its population was 92, in 23 families.
