= Kalateh-ye Yesaval Bashi =

Village in Razavi Khorasan province, Iran

Kalateh-ye Yesaval Bashi Persian: كلاته يساول باشي
- Village
- Country: Iran
- Province: Razavi Khorasan
- County: Quchan
- District: Abkuh
- Rural District: Dughayi

Population (2016)
  - Total: 19
- Time zone: UTC+3:30 (IRST)

Kalateh-ye Yesaval Bashi (Persian: كلاته يساول باشي) (Note: Also romanized as Kalāteh-ye Yesāval Bāshī) is a village in Dughayi Rural District of Abkuh District in Quchan County, Razavi Khorasan province, Iran.

== Demographics ==
=== Population ===
At the time of the 2006 National Census, the village's population was 66 in 17 households, when it was in the Central District. The following census in 2011 counted 28 people in 10 households. The 2016 census measured the population of the village as 19 people in seven households.

In 2020, the rural district was separated from the district in the formation of Abkuh District.
