= Incheh Sabolagh =

Incheh Sabolagh اينچه سابلاغ
- Village
- Location within Iran
- Coordinates: 37°20′46″N 58°36′19″E
- Country: Iran
- Province: Razavi Khorasan
- County: Quchan
- Bakhsh: Bajgiran
- Rural District: Dowlatkhaneh

Population (2006)
  - Total: 358
- Time zone: UTC+3:30 (IRST)
  - Summer (DST): UTC+4:30 (IRDT)

Incheh Sabolagh (Persian: اينچه سابلاغ, also Romanized as Īncheh Sābolāgh and Īncheh Sāblāgh) is a village in Dowlatkhaneh Rural District, Bajgiran District, Quchan County, Razavi Khorasan Province, Iran. At the 2006 census, its population was 358, in 98 families.
