= Shurcheh, Razavi Khorasan =

Village in Razavi Khorasan province, Iran

Shurcheh Persian: شورچه
- Village
- Location within Iran
- Coordinates: 36°55′35″N 58°42′24″E
- Country: Iran
- Province: Razavi Khorasan
- County: Quchan
- District: Abkuh
- Rural District: Dughayi

Population (2016)
  - Total: 298
- Time zone: UTC+3:30 (IRST)

Shurcheh (Persian: شورچه) (Note: Also romanized as Shūrcheh; also known as Shurchen) is a village in Dughayi Rural District of Abkuh District in Quchan County, Razavi Khorasan province, Iran.

== Demographics ==
=== Population ===
At the time of the 2006 National Census, the village's population was 396 in 103 households, when it was in the Central District. The following census in 2011 counted 279 people in 88 households. The 2016 census measured the population of the village as 298 people in 93 households.

In 2020, the rural district was separated from the district in the formation of Abkuh District.
