= Navakh, Quchan =

Village in Razavi Khorasan province, Iran

Navakh Persian: ناوخ
- Village
- Location within Iran
- Coordinates: 37°04′30″N 58°36′46″E
- Country: Iran
- Province: Razavi Khorasan
- County: Quchan
- District: Central
- Rural District: Sudlaneh

Population (2016)
  - Total: 1,300
- Time zone: UTC+3:30 (IRST)

Navakh (Persian: ناوخ) (Note: Also romanized as Nāvakh, Navokh, and Nāvokh) is a village in Sudlaneh Rural District of the Central District in Quchan County, Razavi Khorasan province, Iran.

== Demographics ==
=== Population ===
At the time of the 2006 National Census, the village's population was 1,558 in 357 households. The following census in 2011 counted 1,475 people in 437 households. The 2016 census measured the population of the village as 1,300 people in 413 households.
