= Yasaqi, Razavi Khorasan =

Village in Razavi Khorasan province, Iran

Yasaqi Persian: يساقي
- Village
- Location within Iran
- Coordinates: 36°58′07″N 58°43′00″E
- Country: Iran
- Province: Razavi Khorasan
- County: Quchan
- District: Abkuh
- Rural District: Dughayi

Population (2016)
  - Total: 205
- Time zone: UTC+3:30 (IRST)

Yasaqi (Persian: يساقي) (Note: Also romanized as Yasāqī) is a village in Dughayi Rural District of Abkuh District in Quchan County, Razavi Khorasan province, Iran.

== Demographics ==
=== Population ===
At the time of the 2006 National Census, the village's population was 334 in 94 households, when it was in the Central District. The following census in 2011 counted 243 people in 79 households. The 2016 census measured the population of the village as 205 people in 63 households.

In 2020, the rural district was separated from the district in the formation of Abkuh District.
