= Kalateh-ye Hajji Ali Dad =

Village in Razavi Khorasan province, Iran

Kalateh-ye Hajji Ali Dad Persian: كلاته حاجي علي داد
- Village
- Location within Iran
- Country: Iran
- Province: Razavi Khorasan
- County: Quchan
- District: Abkuh
- Rural District: Dughayi

Population (2016)
  - Total: 15
- Time zone: UTC+3:30 (IRST)

Kalateh-ye Hajji Ali Dad (Persian: كلاته حاجي علي داد) (Note: Also romanized as Kalāteh-ye Ḩājjī ‘Alī Dād; also known as Ḩājjī ‘Alīdād, Kalāteh-ye Ḩājjī ‘Alī, and Kalāteh-ye Hat‘alt) is a village in Dughayi Rural District of Abkuh District in Quchan County, Razavi Khorasan province, Iran.

== Demographics ==
=== Population ===
At the time of the 2006 National Census, the village's population was 31 in nine households, when it was in the Central District. The following census in 2011 counted 17 people in six households. The 2016 census measured the population of the village as 15 people in seven households.

In 2020, the rural district was separated from the district in the formation of Abkuh District.
