= Shah Rag =

Village in Razavi Khorasan province, Iran

Shah Rag Persian: شاهرگ
- Village
- Location within Iran
- Coordinates: 37°26′05″N 58°27′44″E
- Country: Iran
- Province: Razavi Khorasan
- County: Quchan
- District: Bajgiran
- Rural District: Dowlatkhaneh

Population (2016)
  - Total: 788
- Time zone: UTC+3:30 (IRST)

Shah Rag (Persian: شاهرگ) (Note: Also romanized as Shāh Rag and Shāhrg) is a village in Dowlatkhaneh Rural District of Bajgiran District in Quchan County, Razavi Khorasan province, Iran.

== Demographics ==
=== Population ===
At the time of the 2006 National Census, the village's population was 747 in 202 households. The following census in 2011 counted 715 people in 221 households. The 2016 census measured the population of the village as 788 people in 250 households, the most populous in its rural district.
