= Kalateh-ye Archinabad =

Village in Razavi Khorasan province, Iran

Kalateh-ye Archinabad Persian: كلاته ارچين اباد
- Village
- Location within Iran
- Country: Iran
- Province: Razavi Khorasan
- County: Quchan
- District: Central
- Rural District: Sudlaneh

Population (2016)
  - Total: 18
- Time zone: UTC+3:30 (IRST)

Kalateh-ye Archinabad (Persian: كلاته ارچين اباد) (Note: Also romanized as Kalāteh-ye Ārchīnābād; also known as Ārchīnābād and Archīnābād) is a village in Sudlaneh Rural District of the Central District in Quchan County, Razavi Khorasan province, Iran.

== Demographics ==
=== Population ===
At the time of the 2006 National Census, the village's population was 21 in five households. The following census in 2011 counted 25 people in nine households. The 2016 census measured the population of the village as 18 people in six households.
