= Guganlu =

Village in Razavi Khorasan province, Iran

Guganlu Persian: گوگانلو
- Village
- Location within Iran
- Coordinates: 37°02′30″N 58°49′58″E
- Country: Iran
- Province: Razavi Khorasan
- County: Quchan
- District: Central
- Rural District: Sudlaneh

Population (2016)
  - Total: 161
- Time zone: UTC+3:30 (IRST)

Guganlu (Persian: گوگانلو) (Note: Also romanized as Gūgānlū) is a village in Sudlaneh Rural District of the Central District in Quchan County, Razavi Khorasan province, Iran.

== Demographics ==
=== Population ===
At the time of the 2006 National Census, the village's population was 174 in 35 households. The following census in 2011 counted 191 people in 46 households. The 2016 census measured the population of the village as 161 people in 51 households.
