= Dustabad =

Dustabad (Persian: دوست اباد) may refer to:

- Dustabad, Fars
- Dustabad, Mashhad, Razavi Khorasan Province
- Dustabad, Quchan, Razavi Khorasan Province
- Dustabad, Torbat-e Jam, Razavi Khorasan Province
- Dustabad, South Khorasan
- Dustabad, Zirkuh, South Khorasan Province
- Dustabad, Tashkent Province, Uzbekistan
