= Kalateh-ye Hajji Nasir =

Kalateh-ye Hajji Nasir كلاته حاجي نصير
- Village
- Location within Iran
- Coordinates: 37°16′23″N 58°30′53″E
- Country: Iran
- Province: Razavi Khorasan
- County: Quchan
- Bakhsh: Bajgiran
- Rural District: Dowlatkhaneh

Population (2006)
  - Total: 264
- Time zone: UTC+3:30 (IRST)
  - Summer (DST): UTC+4:30 (IRDT)

Kalateh-ye Hajji Nasir (Persian: كلاته حاجي نصير, also Romanized as Kalāteh-ye Ḩājjī Naṣīr; also known as Kalāteh-ye Shāh Moḩammad) is a village in Dowlatkhaneh Rural District, Bajgiran District, Quchan County, Razavi Khorasan Province, Iran. In 2006, its population was 264, in 71 families.
