= Bahar Rural District =

Rural district in Razavi Khorasan province, Iran

Bahar Rural District Persian: دهستان بهار
- Rural District
- Location within Iran
- Coordinates: 36°46′N 58°42′E
- Country: Iran
- Province: Razavi Khorasan
- County: Quchan
- District: Abkuh
- Established: 2020
- Capital: Shafi
- Time zone: UTC+3:30 (IRST)

Bahar Rural District (Persian: دهستان بهار) is in Abkuh District of Quchan County, Razavi Khorasan province, Iran. Its capital is the village of Shafi, whose population at the time of the 2016 National Census was 1,343 in 412 households.

== History ==
In 2020, Dughayi Rural District was separated from the Central District in the formation of Abkuh District, and Bahar Rural District was created in the new district.

== Other villages in the rural district ==
- Allatman
- Andarzi
- Beyg Nazar
- Chahar Suq
- Chanbar Gharbal
- Golshanabad
- Hesar
- Kalateh-ye Ahmad
- Kalateh-ye Ali Zeynal
- Kalateh-ye Zaman
- Kheyrabad
- Lalu
- Maqsudabad
- Meshkanlu
- Rezaabad-e Sharqi
- Sahlabad
- Samangan
- Shoghlabad
- Yazdanabad-e Sharqi
- Zaman Put
