= Yusef Khan, Iran =

Village in Razavi Khorasan province, Iran

Yusef Khan Persian: يوسف خان
- Village
- Location within Iran
- Coordinates: 37°06′36″N 58°37′36″E
- Country: Iran
- Province: Razavi Khorasan
- County: Quchan
- District: Central
- Rural District: Shirin Darreh

Population (2016)
  - Total: 521
- Time zone: UTC+3:30 (IRST)

Yusef Khan (Persian: يوسف خان) (Note: Also romanized as Yūsef Khān and Yūsof Khān; also known as Qal‘eh Yūsuf Khān and Qal‘eh-ye Yūsof) is a village in, and the capital of, Shirin Darreh Rural District in the Central District of Quchan County, Razavi Khorasan province, Iran. The previous capital of the rural district was the village of Mezerj, now a city.

== Demographics ==
=== Population ===
At the time of the 2006 National Census, the village's population was 415 in 121 households. The following census in 2011 counted 348 people in 115 households. The 2016 census measured the population of the village as 521 people in 188 households.
