= Aliabad, Quchan =

Village in Razavi Khorasan province, Iran

Aliabad Persian: علي اباد
- Village
- Location within Iran
- Coordinates: 37°04′02″N 58°35′41″E
- Country: Iran
- Province: Razavi Khorasan
- County: Quchan
- District: Central
- Rural District: Sudlaneh

Population (2016)
  - Total: 1,146
- Time zone: UTC+3:30 (IRST)

Aliabad (Persian: علي اباد) (Note: Also romanized as ‘Alīābād) is a village in, and the capital of, Sudlaneh Rural District in the Central District of Quchan County, Razavi Khorasan province, Iran.

== Demographics ==
=== Population ===
At the time of the 2006 National Census, the village's population was 1,261 in 374 households. The following census in 2011 counted 1,242 people in 402 households. The 2016 census measured the population of the village as 1,146 people in 399 households.
