= Ab Shuri =

Village in Razavi Khorasan province, Iran

Ab Shuri Persian: ابشوري
- Village
- Location within Iran
- Coordinates: 37°05′29″N 58°42′24″E
- Country: Iran
- Province: Razavi Khorasan
- County: Quchan
- District: Central
- Rural District: Sudlaneh

Population (2016)
  - Total: 420
- Time zone: UTC+3:30 (IRST)

Ab Shuri (Persian: ابشوري) (Note: Also romanized as Āb Shūrī and Ābshūrī; also known as Ābshūr) is a village in Sudlaneh Rural District of the Central District in Quchan County, Razavi Khorasan province, Iran.

== Demographics ==
=== Population ===
At the time of the 2006 National Census, the village's population was 516 in 138 households. The following census in 2011 counted 512 people in 152 households. The 2016 census measured the population of the village as 420 people in 172 households.
