= Yadak =

Village in Razavi Khorasan province, Iran

Yadak Persian: يدك
- Village
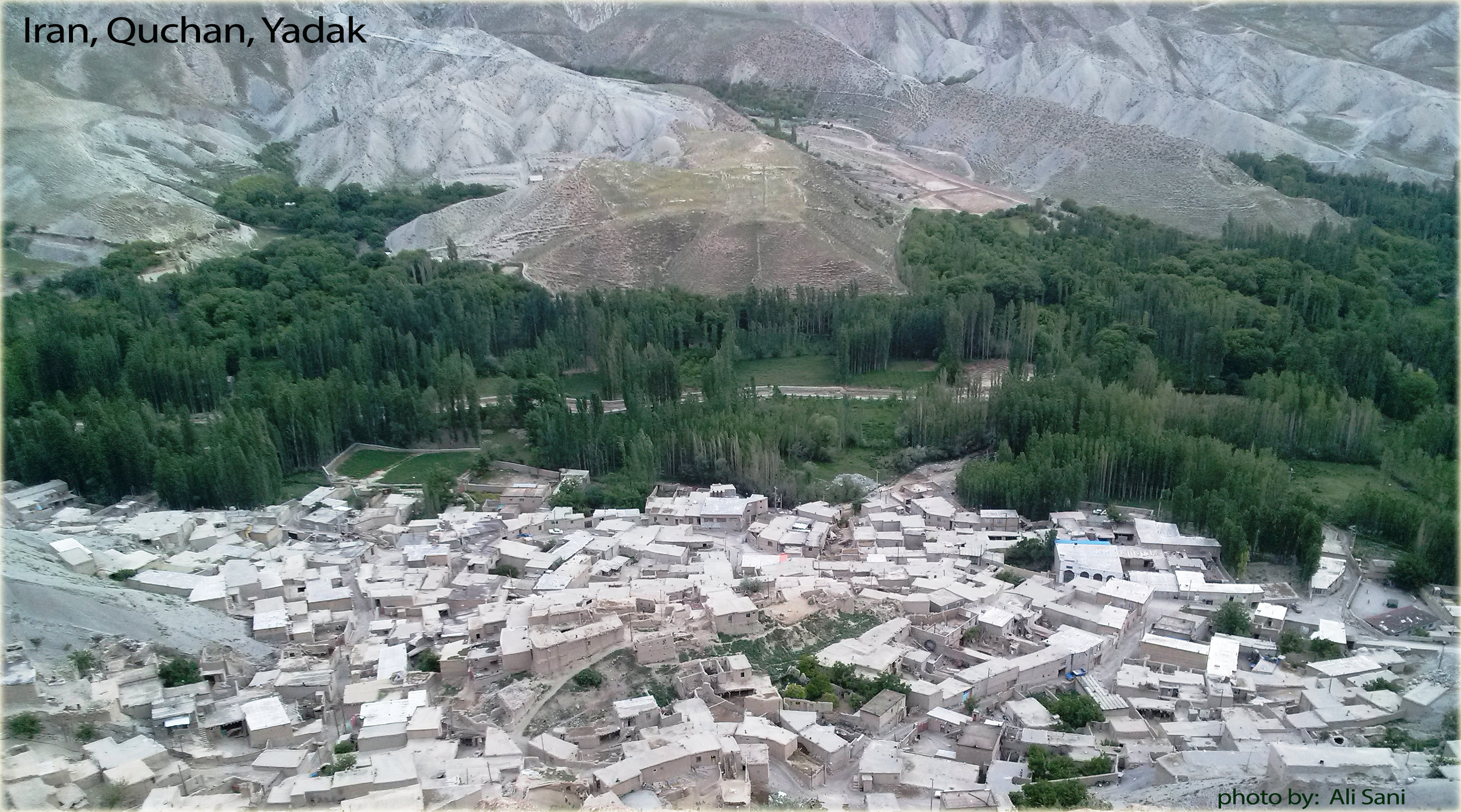
- The village of Yadak

- Location within Iran
- Coordinates: 37°07′40″N 58°53′27″E
- Country: Iran
- Province: Razavi Khorasan
- County: Quchan
- District: Central
- Rural District: Shirin Darreh

Population (2016)
  - Total: 1,731
- Time zone: UTC+3:30 (IRST)

Yadak (Persian: يدك) is a village in Shirin Darreh Rural District of the Central District in Quchan County, Razavi Khorasan province, Iran.

== Demographics ==
=== Population ===
At the time of the 2006 National Census, the village's population was 1,654 in 381 households. The following census in 2011 counted 1,148 people in 327 households. The 2016 census measured the population of the village as 1,731 people in 552 households.
