= Allahian =

Village in Razavi Khorasan province, Iran

Allahian Persian: الهيان
- Village
- Location within Iran
- Coordinates: 37°09′59″N 58°49′42″E
- Country: Iran
- Province: Razavi Khorasan
- County: Quchan
- District: Central
- Rural District: Shirin Darreh

Population (2016)
  - Total: 553
- Time zone: UTC+3:30 (IRST)

Allahian (Persian: الهيان) (Note: Also romanized as Allāhīān, Allāhīyān, Allāhyān, Eláhīān, Elahīān, and Elahiyan; also known as Allāhayān and Allayan) is a village in Shirin Darreh Rural District of the Central District in Quchan County, Razavi Khorasan province, Iran.

== Demographics ==
=== Population ===
At the time of the 2006 National Census, the village's population was 758 in 164 households. The following census in 2011 counted 553 people in 138 households. The 2016 census measured the population of the village as 553 people in 161 households.
