= Aq Kariz =

Village in Razavi Khorasan province, Iran

Aq Kariz Persian: اقكاريز
- Village
- Location within Iran
- Coordinates: 37°08′49″N 58°35′12″E
- Country: Iran
- Province: Razavi Khorasan
- County: Quchan
- District: Central
- Rural District: Shirin Darreh

Population (2016)
  - Total: 1,106
- Time zone: UTC+3:30 (IRST)

Aq Kariz (Persian: اقكاريز) (Note: Also romanized as Āq Kārīz; also known as Āq Kahrīz, Aq Kahrīzak, and Qal‘eh-ye Kahrīz) is a village in Shirin Darreh Rural District of the Central District in Quchan County, Razavi Khorasan province, Iran.

== Demographics ==
=== Population ===
At the time of the 2006 National Census, the village's population was 1,109 in 269 households. The following census in 2011 counted 1,015 people in 285 households. The 2016 census measured the population of the village as 1,106 people in 348 households.
