= Shoghlabad =

Shoghlabad or Shaghlabad (Persian: شغل اباد) may refer to:

- Shoghlabad, Kerman
- Shoghlabad, Razavi Khorasan
