= Emarat, Razavi Khorasan =

Village in Razavi Khorasan province, Iran

Emarat Persian: عمارت
- Village
- Location within Iran
- Coordinates: 37°01′33″N 58°53′55″E
- Country: Iran
- Province: Razavi Khorasan
- County: Quchan
- District: Central
- Rural District: Sudlaneh

Population (2016)
  - Total: 1,183
- Time zone: UTC+3:30 (IRST)

Emarat (Persian: عمارت) (Note: Also romanized as ‘Emārat and ‘Imārat) is a village in Sudlaneh Rural District of the Central District in Quchan County, Razavi Khorasan province, Iran.

== Demographics ==
=== Population ===
At the time of the 2006 National Census, the village's population was 1,546 in 363 households. The following census in 2011 counted 1,486 people in 399 households. The 2016 census measured the population of the village as 1,183 people in 386 households.
