= Qarah Jeqqeh =

Qarah Jeqqeh or Qareh Jaqqeh or Qareh Jeqqeh or Qarah Chaqqeh (Persian: قره جقه) may refer to:

- Qarah Jeqqeh, North Khorasan
- Qarah Jeqqeh, Razavi Khorasan
