= Bardar, Iran =

Village in Razavi Khorasan province, Iran

Bardar Persian: بردر
- Village
- Location within Iran
- Coordinates: 37°37′46″N 58°21′03″E
- Country: Iran
- Province: Razavi Khorasan
- County: Quchan
- District: Bajgiran
- Rural District: Dowlatkhaneh

Population (2016)
  - Total: 450
- Time zone: UTC+3:30 (IRST)

Bardar (Persian: بردر) is a village in Dowlatkhaneh Rural District of Bajgiran District in Quchan County, Razavi Khorasan province, Iran.

== Demographics ==
=== Population ===
At the time of the 2006 National Census, the village's population was 665 in 173 households. The following census in 2011 counted 534 people in 161 households. The 2016 census measured the population of the village as 450 people in 155 households.
