= Dadanlu =

Village in Razavi Khorasan province, Iran

Dadanlu Persian: ددانلو
- Village
- Location within Iran
- Coordinates: 37°01′30″N 58°51′59″E
- Country: Iran
- Province: Razavi Khorasan
- County: Quchan
- District: Central
- Rural District: Sudlaneh

Population (2016)
  - Total: 378
- Time zone: UTC+3:30 (IRST)

Dadanlu (Persian: ددانلو) (Note: Also romanized as Dadānlū) is a village in Sudlaneh Rural District of the Central District in Quchan County, Razavi Khorasan province, Iran.

== Demographics ==
=== Population ===
At the time of the 2006 National Census, the village's population was 407 in 89 households. The following census in 2011 counted 404 people in 110 households. The 2016 census measured the population of the village as 378 people in 116 households.
