= Rahvard =

Village in Razavi Khorasan province, Iran

Rahvard Persian: رهورد
- Village
- Location within Iran
- Coordinates: 37°19′50″N 58°25′29″E
- Country: Iran
- Province: Razavi Khorasan
- County: Quchan
- District: Bajgiran
- Rural District: Dowlatkhaneh

Population (2016)
  - Total: 348
- Time zone: UTC+3:30 (IRST)

Rahvard (Persian: رهورد) is a village in Dowlatkhaneh Rural District of Bajgiran District in Quchan County, Razavi Khorasan province, Iran.

== Demographics ==
=== Population ===
At the time of the 2006 National Census, the village's population was 503 in 135 households. The following census in 2011 counted 422 people in 129 households. The 2016 census measured the population of the village as 348 people in 132 households.
