= Molla Mahmud =

Molla Mahmud (Persian: ملامحمود) may refer to:

- Molla Mahmud, Bushehr
- Molla Mahmud, East Azerbaijan
- Molla Mahmud, Razavi Khorasan
