= Emamqoli, Razavi Khorasan =

Village in Razavi Khorasan province, Iran

Emamqoli Persian: امامقلی
- Village
- Location within Iran
- Coordinates: 37°24′16″N 58°31′06″E
- Country: Iran
- Province: Razavi Khorasan
- County: Quchan
- District: Bajgiran
- Rural District: Dowlatkhaneh

Population (2016)
  - Total: 737
- Time zone: UTC+3:30 (IRST)

Emamqoli (Persian: امامقلی) (Note: Also romanized as Emāmqolī; also known as Imām Quli) is a village in, and the capital of, Dowlatkhaneh Rural District in Bajgiran District of Quchan County, Razavi Khorasan province, Iran.

== Demographics ==
=== Population ===
At the time of the 2006 National Census, the village's population was 689 in 201 households. The following census in 2011 counted 879 people in 233 households. The 2016 census measured the population of the village as 737 people in 214 households.
