= Bad Khvor =

Village in Razavi Khorasan province, Iran

Bad Khvor Persian: بادخور
- Village
- Location within Iran
- Coordinates: 37°07′11″N 58°39′36″E
- Country: Iran
- Province: Razavi Khorasan
- County: Quchan
- District: Central
- Rural District: Shirin Darreh

Population (2016)
  - Total: 423
- Time zone: UTC+3:30 (IRST)

Bad Khvor (Persian: بادخور) (Note: Also romanized as Bād Khvor) is a village in Shirin Darreh Rural District of the Central District in Quchan County, Razavi Khorasan province, Iran.

== Demographics ==
=== Population ===
At the time of the 2006 National Census, the village's population was 455 in 109 households. The following census in 2011 counted 320 people in 90 households. The 2016 census measured the population of the village as 423 people in 164 households.
