= Pariabad, Quchan =

Village in Razavi Khorasan province, Iran

Pariabad Persian: پري اباد
- Village
- Location within Iran
- Coordinates: 37°06′52″N 58°37′30″E
- Country: Iran
- Province: Razavi Khorasan
- County: Quchan
- District: Central
- Rural District: Shirin Darreh

Population (2016)
  - Total: 400
- Time zone: UTC+3:30 (IRST)

Pariabad (Persian: پري اباد) (Note: Also romanized as Parīābād) is a village in Shirin Darreh Rural District of the Central District in Quchan County, Razavi Khorasan province, Iran.

== Demographics ==
=== Population ===
At the time of the 2006 National Census, the village's population was 441 in 103 households. The following census in 2011 counted 298 people in 83 households. The 2016 census measured the population of the village as 400 people in 155 households.
