= Qach Kanlu =

Village in Razavi Khorasan province, Iran

Qach Kanlu Persian: قاچكانلو
- Village
- Location within Iran
- Coordinates: 37°16′08″N 58°32′11″E
- Country: Iran
- Province: Razavi Khorasan
- County: Quchan
- District: Bajgiran
- Rural District: Dowlatkhaneh

Population (2016)
  - Total: 725
- Time zone: UTC+3:30 (IRST)

Qach Kanlu (Persian: قاچكانلو) (Note: Also romanized as Qāch Kānlū) is a village in Dowlatkhaneh Rural District of Bajgiran District in Quchan County, Razavi Khorasan province, Iran.

== Demographics ==
=== Population ===
At the time of the 2006 National Census, the village's population was 1,076 in 257 households. The following census in 2011 counted 902 people in 262 households. The 2016 census measured the population of the village as 725 people in 236 households.
