= Beniabid =

Village in Razavi Khorasan province, Iran

Beniabid Persian: بنيابيد
- Village
- Location within Iran
- Coordinates: 36°56′03″N 58°31′38″E
- Country: Iran
- Province: Razavi Khorasan
- County: Quchan
- District: Abkuh
- Rural District: Dughayi

Population (2016)
  - Total: 450
- Time zone: UTC+3:30 (IRST)

Beniabid (Persian: بنيابيد) (Note: Also romanized as Benīābīd; also known as Benābīd) is a village in Dughayi Rural District of Abkuh District in Quchan County, Razavi Khorasan province, Iran.

== Demographics ==
=== Population ===
At the time of the 2006 National Census, the village's population was 564 in 114 households, when it was in the Central District. The following census in 2011 counted 493 people in 123 households. The 2016 census measured the population of the village as 450 people in 131 households.

In 2020, the rural district was separated from the district in the formation of Abkuh District.
