= Kalateh-ye Hajji Ali =

Kalateh-ye Hajji Ali may refer to:

- Kalateh-ye Hajji Ali Dad
- Kalateh-ye Hajj Ali
