= Jowzan, Razavi Khorasan =

Village in Razavi Khorasan province, Iran

Jowzan Persian: جوزان
- Village
- Location within Iran
- Coordinates: 37°21′32″N 58°23′05″E
- Country: Iran
- Province: Razavi Khorasan
- County: Quchan
- District: Bajgiran
- Rural District: Dowlatkhaneh

Population (2016)
  - Total: 473
- Time zone: UTC+3:30 (IRST)

Jowzan (Persian: جوزان) (Note: Also romanized as Jowzān) is a village in Dowlatkhaneh Rural District of Bajgiran District in Quchan County, Razavi Khorasan province, Iran.

== Demographics ==
=== Population ===
At the time of the 2006 National Census, the village's population was 720 in 205 households. The following census in 2011 counted 561 people in 186 households. The 2016 census measured the population of the village as 473 people in 176 households.
