= Zalabad =

Village in Razavi Khorasan province, Iran

Zalabad Persian: زال اباد
- Village
- Location within Iran
- Country: Iran
- Province: Razavi Khorasan
- County: Quchan
- District: Central
- Rural District: Sudlaneh

Population (2016)
  - Total: 0
- Time zone: UTC+3:30 (IRST)

Zalabad (Persian: زال اباد) (Note: Also romanized as Zalābād) is a village in Sudlaneh Rural District of the Central District in Quchan County, Razavi Khorasan province, Iran.

== Demographics ==
=== Population ===
At the time of the 2006 National Census, the village's population was 24 in seven households. The following census in 2011 counted 18 people in five households. The 2016 census measured the population of the village as zero.
