= Shamkhal, Iran =

Shamkhal شمخال
- Village
- Location within Iran
- Coordinates: 37°35′15″N 58°27′24″E
- Country: Iran
- Province: Razavi Khorasan
- County: Quchan
- Bakhsh: Bajgiran
- Rural District: Dowlatkhaneh

Population (2006)
  - Total: 164
- Time zone: UTC+3:30 (IRST)
  - Summer (DST): UTC+4:30 (IRDT)

Shamkhal (Persian: شمخال, also Romanized as Shamkhāl) is a village in Dowlatkhaneh Rural District, Bajgiran District, Quchan County, Razavi Khorasan Province, Iran. At the 2006 census, its population was 164, in 44 families.
