= Li Chun =

Li Chun or Lichun may refer to:

== People ==
=== Given name "Chun" surname "Li" ===
- Emperor Xianzong of Tang (778–820), personal name Li Chun, emperor of the Tang dynasty
- Li Chun (warlord) (1867–1920), Chinese general
- Li Chun (diplomat) (1892–1948), Chinese diplomat
- Li Chun (actress) (born 1988), Chinese actress
- Li Qinyao (born 1988), birth name Li Chun, Chinese actress
- Li Zhun (1928–2000), Chinese writer, formerly romanized as Li Chun
- Mason Lee (李淳; born 1990), Taiwanese-American actor

== Places ==
- Lichun, Sichuan, a town in Pengzhou, Sichuan, China

== Other topics ==
- Lichun, a solar term in East Asian Calendars
- And the Spring Comes, a 2007 Chinese film by Gu Changwei

== See also ==
- ROKS Lee Chun (SS-062), a South Korean submarine
- Chun-Li, a character from the video game, Street Fighter
- Chun Li (disambiguation)
- Chun (disambiguation)
- Li (disambiguation)
