= Kalateh-ye Mirza Mohammad Ali =

Village in Razavi Khorasan province, Iran

Kalateh-ye Mirza Mohammad Ali Persian: كلاته ميرزامحمدعلي
- Village
- Location within Iran
- Coordinates: 37°03′30″N 58°36′59″E
- Country: Iran
- Province: Razavi Khorasan
- County: Quchan
- District: Central
- Rural District: Sudlaneh

Population (2016)
  - Total: 217
- Time zone: UTC+3:30 (IRST)

Kalateh-ye Mirza Mohammad Ali (Persian: كلاته ميرزامحمدعلي) (Note: Also romanized as Kalāteh-ye Mīrzā Moḩammad ʿAlī; also known as Kalāteh-ye Mīrzā Moḩammad Reẕā) is a village in Sudlaneh Rural District of the Central District in Quchan County, Razavi Khorasan province, Iran.

== Demographics ==
=== Population ===
At the time of the 2006 National Census, the village's population was 132 in 38 households. The following census in 2011 counted 169 people in 49 households. The 2016 census measured the population of the village as 217 people in 68 households.
