= Pakotal, Razavi Khorasan =

Pakotal پاكتل
- Village
- Location within Iran
- Coordinates: 37°16′57″N 58°37′10″E
- Country: Iran
- Province: Razavi Khorasan
- County: Quchan
- Bakhsh: Bajgiran
- Rural District: Dowlatkhaneh

Population (2006)
  - Total: 131
- Time zone: UTC+3:30 (IRST)
  - Summer (DST): UTC+4:30 (IRDT)

Pakotal (Persian: پاكتل, also Romanized as Pākotal; also known as Pāy Kotal) is a village in Dowlatkhaneh Rural District, Bajgiran District, Quchan County, Razavi Khorasan Province, Iran. At the 2006 census, its population was 131, in 44 families.
