= Ab Jahan =

Village in Razavi Khorasan province, Iran

Ab Jahan Persian: ابجهان
- Village
- Location within Iran
- Coordinates: 37°21′15″N 58°24′37″E
- Country: Iran
- Province: Razavi Khorasan
- County: Quchan
- District: Bajgiran
- Rural District: Dowlatkhaneh

Population (2016)
  - Total: 350
- Time zone: UTC+3:30 (IRST)

Ab Jahan (Persian: ابجهان) (Note: Also romanized as Āb Jahān and Āb-e Jahān; also known as Ab-e Sahān) is a village in Dowlatkhaneh Rural District of Bajgiran District in Quchan County, Razavi Khorasan province, Iran.

== Demographics ==
=== Population ===
At the time of the 2006 National Census, the village's population was 388 in 113 households. The following census in 2011 counted 353 people in 111 households. The 2016 census measured the population of the village as 350 people in 125 households.
