= Dizadiz =

Village in Razavi Khorasan province, Iran

Dizadiz Persian: ديزاديز
- Village
- Location within Iran
- Coordinates: 37°05′17″N 58°44′23″E
- Country: Iran
- Province: Razavi Khorasan
- County: Quchan
- District: Central
- Rural District: Sudlaneh

Population (2016)
  - Total: 817
- Time zone: UTC+3:30 (IRST)

Dizadiz (Persian: ديزاديز) (Note: Also romanized as Dīzādīz) is a village in Sudlaneh Rural District of the Central District in Quchan County, Razavi Khorasan province, Iran.

== Demographics ==
=== Language and ethnicity ===
The people in Dizadiz speak a kind of Azeri language. However, some original Kurdish people immigrated a few hundred years ago and settled in Dizadiz.

=== Population ===
At the time of the 2006 National Census, the village's population was 1,104 in 256 households. The following census in 2011 counted 1,087 people in 299 households. The 2016 census measured the population of the village as 817 people in 231 households.
