= Chah Ab, Razavi Khorasan =

Village in Razavi Khorasan province, Iran

Chah Ab Persian: چاه اب
- Village
- Location within Iran
- Country: Iran
- Province: Razavi Khorasan
- County: Quchan
- District: Abkuh
- Rural District: Dughayi

Population (2016)
  - Total: 47
- Time zone: UTC+3:30 (IRST)

Chah Ab (Persian: چاه اب) (Note: Also romanized as Chāh Āb) is a village in Dughayi Rural District of Abkuh District in Quchan County, Razavi Khorasan province, Iran.

== Demographics ==
=== Population ===
At the time of the 2006 National Census, the village's population was 45 in 15 households, when it was in the Central District. The following census in 2011 counted 71 people in 21 households. The 2016 census measured the population of the village as 47 people in 16 households.

In 2020, the rural district was separated from the district in the formation of Abkuh District.
