= Dizavand =

Village in Razavi Khorasan province, Iran

Dizavand Persian: ديزاوند
- Village
- Location within Iran
- Coordinates: 37°03′12″N 58°37′04″E
- Country: Iran
- Province: Razavi Khorasan
- County: Quchan
- District: Central
- Rural District: Sudlaneh

Population (2016)
  - Total: 596
- Time zone: UTC+3:30 (IRST)

Dizavand (Persian: ديزاوند) (Note: Also romanized as Dīzāvand) is a village in Sudlaneh Rural District of the Central District in Quchan County, Razavi Khorasan province, Iran.

== Demographics ==
=== Ethnicity ===
The population of Dizavand is Kurdish (Kurmanji).

=== Population ===
At the time of the 2006 National Census, the village's population was 818 in 210 households. The following census in 2011 counted 801 people in 227 households. The 2016 census measured the population of the village as 596 people in 197 households.
