= Dustabad, Quchan =

Village in Razavi Khorasan province, Iran

Dustabad Persian: دوست اباد
- Village
- Location within Iran
- Country: Iran
- Province: Razavi Khorasan
- County: Quchan
- District: Abkuh
- Rural District: Dughayi

Population (2016)
  - Total: 28
- Time zone: UTC+3:30 (IRST)

Dustabad (Persian: دوست اباد) (Note: Also romanized as Dūstābād; also known as Dostābād) is a village in Dughayi Rural District of Abkuh District in Quchan County, Razavi Khorasan province, Iran.

== Demographics ==
=== Population ===
At the time of the 2006 National Census, the village's population was 38 in 14 households, when it was in the Central District. The following census in 2011 counted 30 people in 15 households. The 2016 census measured the population of the village as 28 people in 13 households.

In 2020, the rural district was separated from the district in the formation of Abkuh District.
