= Yadegar, Razavi Khorasan =

Village in Razavi Khorasan province, Iran

Yadegar Persian: يادگار
- Village
- Location within Iran
- Coordinates: 37°15′37″N 58°34′56″E
- Country: Iran
- Province: Razavi Khorasan
- County: Quchan
- District: Bajgiran
- Rural District: Dowlatkhaneh

Population (2016)
  - Total: 329
- Time zone: UTC+3:30 (IRST)

|other uses of the same name|Yadegar (disambiguation)|Yadegar}}

Yadegar (Persian: يادگار) (Note: Also romanized as Yādegār; also known as Kozma and Yadgah) is a village in Dowlatkhaneh Rural District of Bajgiran District in Quchan County, Razavi Khorasan province, Iran.

== Demographics ==
=== Population ===
At the time of the 2006 National Census, the village's population was 440 in 125 households. The following census in 2011 counted 344 people in 112 households. The 2016 census measured the population of the village as 329 people in 114 households.
