= Eslamabad, Bajgiran =

Village in Razavi Khorasan province, Iran

Eslamabad Persian: اسلام اباد
- Village
- Location within Iran
- Coordinates: 37°13′49″N 58°39′19″E
- Country: Iran
- Province: Razavi Khorasan
- County: Quchan
- District: Bajgiran
- Rural District: Dowlatkhaneh

Population (2016)
  - Total: 452
- Time zone: UTC+3:30 (IRST)

Eslamabad (Persian: اسلام اباد) (Note: Also romanized as Eslāmābād; also known as Emām Verdīkhān (امام ورديخان)) is a village in Dowlatkhaneh Rural District of Bajgiran District in Quchan County, Razavi Khorasan province, Iran.

== Demographics ==
=== Population ===
At the time of the 2006 National Census, the village's population was 366 in 86 households. The following census in 2011 counted 463 people in 132 households. The 2016 census measured the population of the village as 452 people in 154 households.
