= Kachalanlu =

Village in Razavi Khorasan province, Iran

Kachalanlu Persian: كچلانلو
- Village
- Location within Iran
- Coordinates: 37°03′35″N 58°48′04″E
- Country: Iran
- Province: Razavi Khorasan
- County: Quchan
- District: Central
- Rural District: Sudlaneh

Population (2016)
  - Total: 550
- Time zone: UTC+3:30 (IRST)

Kachalanlu (Persian: كچلانلو) (Note: Also romanized as Kachalānlū; also known as Kachalan) is a village in Sudlaneh Rural District of the Central District in Quchan County, Razavi Khorasan province, Iran.

== Demographics ==
=== Population ===
At the time of the 2006 National Census, the village's population was 687 in 147 households. The following census in 2011 counted 681 people in 202 households. The 2016 census measured the population of the village as 550 people in 170 households.
