= Hey Hey, Iran =

Village in Razavi Khorasan province, Iran

Hey Hey Persian: هي هي
- Village
- Location within Iran
- Coordinates: 37°06′42″N 58°31′56″E
- Country: Iran
- Province: Razavi Khorasan
- County: Quchan
- District: Central
- Rural District: Shirin Darreh

Population (2016)
  - Total: 1,296
- Time zone: UTC+3:30 (IRST)

Hey Hey (Persian: هي هي) is a village in Shirin Darreh Rural District of the Central District in Quchan County, Razavi Khorasan province, Iran.

== Demographics ==
=== Population ===
At the time of the 2006 National Census, the village's population was 1,452 in 351 households. The following census in 2011 counted 1,511 people in 410 households. The 2016 census measured the population of the village as 1,296 people in 402 households.
