= Khalkanlu =

Village in Razavi Khorasan province, Iran

Khalkanlu Persian: خلكانلو
- Village
- Location within Iran
- Coordinates: 37°04′10″N 58°46′37″E
- Country: Iran
- Province: Razavi Khorasan
- County: Quchan
- District: Central
- Rural District: Sudlaneh

Population (2016)
  - Total: 349
- Time zone: UTC+3:30 (IRST)

Khalkanlu (Persian: خلكانلو) (Note: Also romanized as Khalkānlū) is a village in Sudlaneh Rural District of the Central District in Quchan County, Razavi Khorasan province, Iran.

== Demographics ==
=== Population ===
At the time of the 2006 National Census, the village's population was 745 in 142 households. The following census in 2011 counted 571 people in 161 households. The 2016 census measured the population of the village as 349 people in 124 households.
