= Qasemabad, Quchan =

Village in Razavi Khorasan province, Iran

Qasemabad Persian: قاسم اباد
- Village
- Location within Iran
- Coordinates: 37°05′21″N 58°32′14″E
- Country: Iran
- Province: Razavi Khorasan
- County: Quchan
- District: Central
- Rural District: Sudlaneh

Population (2016)
  - Total: 1,598
- Time zone: UTC+3:30 (IRST)

Qasemabad (Persian: قاسم اباد) (Note: Also romanized as Qāsemābād) is a village in Sudlaneh Rural District of the Central District in Quchan County, Razavi Khorasan province, Iran.

== Demographics ==
=== Population ===
At the time of the 2006 National Census, the village's population was 1,114 in 239 households. The following census in 2011 counted 1,292 people in 340 households. The 2016 census measured the population of the village as 1,598 people in 433 households.
