= Benabid =

Benabid may refer to:

- Beniabid or Benabid, a village in Iran

== People with the surname ==
- Alim-Louis Benabid, French neurosurgeon and medical researcher
