= Farkhan-e Shahrah =

Village in Razavi Khorasan province, Iran

Farkhan-e Shahrah Persian: فرخان شاهرا
- Village
- Location within Iran
- Coordinates: 37°04′33″N 58°32′00″E
- Country: Iran
- Province: Razavi Khorasan
- County: Quchan
- District: Central
- Rural District: Sudlaneh

Population (2016)
  - Total: 1,042
- Time zone: UTC+3:30 (IRST)

Farkhan-e Shahrah (Persian: فرخان شاهرا) (Note: Also romanized as Farkhān-e Shāhrāh) is a village in Sudlaneh Rural District of the Central District in Quchan County, Razavi Khorasan province, Iran.

== Demographics ==
=== Population ===
At the time of the 2006 National Census, the village's population was 768 in 168 households. The following census in 2011 counted 923 people in 182 households. The 2016 census measured the population of the village as 1,042 people in 199 households.
