= Farkhan-e Kohneh =

Village in Razavi Khorasan province, Iran

Farkhan-e Kohneh Persian: فرخان كهنه
- Village
- Location within Iran
- Coordinates: 37°05′00″N 58°32′00″E
- Country: Iran
- Province: Razavi Khorasan
- County: Quchan
- District: Central
- Rural District: Sudlaneh

Population (2016)
  - Total: 263
- Time zone: UTC+3:30 (IRST)

Farkhan-e Kohneh (Persian: فرخان كهنه) (Note: Also romanized as Farkhān-e Kohneh) is a village in Sudlaneh Rural District of the Central District in Quchan County, Razavi Khorasan province, Iran.

== Demographics ==
=== Population ===
At the time of the 2006 National Census, the village's population was 265 in 59 households. The following census in 2011 counted 276 people in 75 households. The 2016 census measured the population of the village as 263 people in 79 households.
