= Farkhan-e Sofla =

Village in Razavi Khorasan province, Iran

Farkhan-e Sofla Persian: فرخان سفلي
- Village
- Location within Iran
- Coordinates: 37°04′47″N 58°32′19″E
- Country: Iran
- Province: Razavi Khorasan
- County: Quchan
- District: Central
- Rural District: Sudlaneh

Population (2016)
  - Total: 1,094
- Time zone: UTC+3:30 (IRST)

Farkhan-e Sofla (Persian: فرخان سفلي) (Note: Also romanized as Farkhān-e Soflā; also known as Farkhān-e Pā’īn) is a village in Sudlaneh Rural District of the Central District in Quchan County, Razavi Khorasan province, Iran.

== Demographics ==
=== Population ===
At the time of the 2006 National Census, the village's population was 1,044 in 249 households. The following census in 2011 counted 960 people in 271 households. The 2016 census measured the population of the village as 1,094 people in 324 households.
