= Molla Mohammad =

Molla Mohammad or Mulla Muhammad (Persian: ملامحمد) may refer to:

- Molla Mohammad, Bushehr
- Molla Mohammad, Razavi Khorasan
