= Pakotal =

Pakotal (Persian: پاكتل) may refer to:

- Pakotal, North Khorasan
- Pakotal, Razavi Khorasan
