= Kalateh-ye Molla Mohammad =

Kalateh-ye Molla Mohammad كلاته ملامحمد
- Village
- Location within Iran
- Coordinates: 37°17′48″N 58°30′17″E
- Country: Iran
- Province: Razavi Khorasan
- County: Quchan
- Bakhsh: Bajgiran
- Rural District: Dowlatkhaneh

Population (2006)
  - Total: 205
- Time zone: UTC+3:30 (IRST)
  - Summer (DST): UTC+4:30 (IRDT)

Kalateh-ye Molla Mohammad (Persian: كلاته ملامحمد, also Romanized as Kalāteh-ye Mollā Moḩammad and Kalāteh Mollā Mohammad; also known as Mollā Maḩmūd, Mollā Moḩammad, Mulla Muhammad, and Tāzākand) is a village in Dowlatkhaneh Rural District, Bajgiran District, Quchan County, Razavi Khorasan Province, Iran. At the 2006 census, its population was 205, in 49 families.
