= Gulshanabad =

Gulshanabad (Persian: گلشن آباد) meaning City of Rose garden. It may refer to:

Pakistan

- Gulshanabad (Rawalpindi) is located in Rawalpindi, Punjab, Pakistan

India

- Srikakulam prior to 1759
- Medak until the rule of Nizam
- Nashik, India from 1487 to 1818

== See also ==
- Golshanabad (disambiguation)
