= Shamkhal =

Shamkhal may refer to:

- Shamkhal (title), title of the rulers of Kumukh and Tarki in Dagestan
- Shamkhal, Russia, an urban-type settlement in the Republic of Dagestan, Russia
- Shamkhal, Iran
