= Kalateh-ye Shah Mohammad =

Kalateh-ye Shah Mohammad (Persian: كلاته شاه محمد) may refer to:

- Kalateh-ye Shah Mohammad, Kashmar
- Kalateh-ye Shah Mohammad, Quchan
