= Almajeq =

City in Razavi Khorasan province, Iran

Almajeq Persian: الماجق
- City
- Location within Iran
- Coordinates: 36°56′36″N 58°40′52″E
- Country: Iran
- Province: Razavi Khorasan
- County: Quchan
- District: Abkuh
- Established as a city: 2021

Population (2016)
  - Total: 1,588
- Time zone: UTC+3:30 (IRST)

Almajeq (Persian: الماجق) (Note: Also romanized as Ālmājeq, Ālmajeq, and Ālmajoq) is a city in, and the capital of, Abkuh District in Quchan County, Razavi Khorasan province, Iran. As a village, it was the capital of Dughayi Rural District until its capital was transferred to the village of Dughayi.

== Demographics ==
=== Population ===
At the time of the 2006 National Census, Almajeq's population was 1,291 in 312 households, when it was a village in Dughayi Rural District of the Central District. The following census in 2011 counted 1,360 people in 391 households. The 2016 census measured the population of the village as 1,588 people in 463 households, the most populous in its rural district.

In 2020, the rural district was separated from the district in the formation of Abkuh District, and Almajeq was converted to a city in 2021.
