= Farkhan-e Olya =

Village in Razavi Khorasan province, Iran

Farkhan-e Olya Persian: فرخان عليا
- Village
- Location within Iran
- Coordinates: 37°05′08″N 58°32′16″E
- Country: Iran
- Province: Razavi Khorasan
- County: Quchan
- District: Central
- Rural District: Sudlaneh

Population (2016)
  - Total: 2,062
- Time zone: UTC+3:30 (IRST)

Farkhan-e Olya (Persian: فرخان عليا) (Note: Also romanized as Farkhān-e ‘Olyā; also known as Farkhān-e Bālā) is a village in Sudlaneh Rural District of the Central District in Quchan County, Razavi Khorasan province, Iran.

== Demographics ==
=== Population ===
At the time of the 2006 National Census, the village's population was 1,839 in 434 households. The following census in 2011 counted 1,997 people in 526 households. The 2016 census measured the population of the village as 2,062 people in 570 households. It was the most populous village in its rural district.
