= Yesaqi =

Yesaqi or Yasaqi (Persian: يساقي) may refer to:

- Yesaqi, Golestan
- Yasaqi, Razavi Khorasan
