= Mezerj =

City in Razavi Khorasan province, Iran

Mezerj Persian: مزرج
- City
- Location within Iran
- Coordinates: 37°09′05″N 58°33′03″E
- Country: Iran
- Province: Razavi Khorasan
- County: Quchan
- District: Central
- Established as a city: 2021

Population (2016)
  - Total: 3,834
- Time zone: UTC+3:30 (IRST)

Mezerj (Persian: مزرج) (Note: Also romanized as Mazerj; also known as Mazrag) is a city in the Central District of Quchan County, Razavi Khorasan province, Iran. It was the capital of Shirin Darreh Rural District until its capital was transferred to the village of Yusef Khan.

== Demographics ==
=== Population ===
At the time of the 2006 National Census, Mezerj's population was 3,704 in 873 households, when it was a village in Shirin Darreh Rural District. The following census in 2011 counted 3,766 people in 1,061 households. The 2016 census measured the population of the village as 3,834 people in 1,193 households, the most populous in its rural district.

Mezerj was converted to a city in 2021.
