= Bajgiran =

City in Razavi Khorasan province, Iran

Bajgiran Persian: باجگيران
- City
- Interactive map of Bajgiran
- Location within Iran
- Coordinates: 37°37′17″N 58°25′06″E
- Country: Iran
- Province: Razavi Khorasan
- County: Quchan
- District: Bajgiran

Population (2016)
  - Total: 594
- Time zone: UTC+3:30 (IRST)

Bajgiran (Persian: باجگيران) (Note: Also romanized as Bājgīrān) is a city in, and the capital of, Bajgiran District in Quchan County, Razavi Khorasan province, Iran. On the Iran-Turkmenistan border, it is the site of an official crossing point into Turkmenistan.

== Demographics ==
=== Ethnicity ===
Most of its inhabitants are Kormanj Kurds of the Sioukanlu tribe who migrated to this region from eastern Turkey. Bajgiran is located in northwestern Khorasan, and the Kurmanj Kurds were relocated to northwestern Khorasan during the early Safavid dynasty to prevent invasions by Turkmenistan and Uzbekistan. The common languages in the city are mostly Kurdish Kormanji and Turkish and Persian are a minority. The religion of all is The Shiites of Twelve Imams.

=== Population ===
At the time of the 2006 National Census, the city's population was 753 in 217 households. The following census in 2011 counted 406 people in 123 households. The 2016 census measured the population of the city as 594 people in 188 households.

== See also ==
Bajgiran travel guide from Wikivoyage
