= Gulshanabad, Rawalpindi =

Gulshanabad
- Neighborhood
- Logo of Gulshanabad

- Location within Pakistan
- Coordinates: 33°31′53″N 73°03′41″E
- Country: Pakistan
- Province: Punjab (Pakistan)
- District: Rawalpindi
- Established: 1982; 44 years ago

Area
  - Total: 1.27 km^{2} (0.49 sq mi)
- Elevation: 509 m (1,670 ft)
- Time zone: UTC+5 (PST)
- Postal code: 46606

Gulshanabad, (Urdu: گلشن آباد) officially the Abad Cooperative Housing Society (ACHS), is a neighborhood of Rawalpindi, (Punjab, Pakistan) established around Soan River.

The suburb is situated on Adyala Road of Rawalpindi, Adyala Road leads to the infamous Adyala Jail. The colony was settled in 1982 and became functional in 1987 and contains 4 sectors and has a central market along with a central green area park and a Central Mosque (Jamia Masjid).

The society was initially established by the Agency for Barani Areas Development (ABAD) in 1982 for the residence of its employees and officers only but later other citizens were also allowed to buy their plots and it became a public housing society.
