= Chun =

Chun may refer to:

== Places ==
- Chun River in Thailand
- Chun District in Phayao Province, Thailand
- Chûn Castle, a hillfort in the United Kingdom
- Commandery (China) (Chinese: 郡; Wade–Giles: chün), an administrative division of imperial China

== People and names ==
- Jeon (surname) (Korean: 전; Hanja: 全, 田, 錢), a common Korean surname spelled Chun by about 5% of its bearers
- Cheon (Korean surname) (Korean: 천; Hanja: 千, 天), a less common Korean surname spelled Chun by about 40% of its bearers
- Joon (Korean name) (Korean: 준), a rare Korean surname spelled Chun in the McCune–Reischauer romanisation
- Chen (surname) (Chinese: 陳), a Chinese surname also spelled Chun
- Carl Chun (1852–1914), German zoologist
- Chun (Bible), a biblical name
- Prince Chun (disambiguation), the title of various princes of the Chinese Qing dynasty

== Other ==
- Ch'un, a type of Chinese clam monster
- Chun (season) (Chinese: 春), the Chinese season of spring

== See also ==
- Qian (disambiguation)
