= Molla Mahmud, East Azerbaijan =

Molla Mahmud ملامحمود
- Village
- Location within Iran
- Coordinates: 37°42′56″N 47°04′25″E
- Country: Iran
- Province: East Azerbaijan
- County: Bostanabad
- Bakhsh: Tekmeh Dash
- Rural District: Azarbaijan-e Sharqi

Population (2006)
  - Total: 43
- Time zone: UTC+3:30 (IRST)
  - Summer (DST): UTC+4:30 (IRDT)

Molla Mahmud (Persian: ملامحمود, also Romanized as Mollā Maḩmūd) is a village in Abbas-e Sharqi Rural District, Tekmeh Dash District, Bostanabad County, East Azerbaijan Province, Iran. At the 2006 census, its population was 43, in 8 families.
