= Prince Chun =

Prince Chun may refer to any of the following princely peerages of the Qing dynasty in China:

- Prince Chun (純), created in 1674
- Prince Chun (淳), created in 1709
- Prince Chun (醇), created in 1872
