= Kalateh-ye Hajj Ali =

Kalateh-ye Hajj Ali كلاته حاج علي
- Village
- Location within Iran
- Coordinates: 35°50′48″N 60°16′23″E
- Country: Iran
- Province: Razavi Khorasan
- County: Mashhad
- Bakhsh: Razaviyeh
- Rural District: Pain Velayat

Population (2006)
  - Total: 108
- Time zone: UTC+3:30 (IRST)
  - Summer (DST): UTC+4:30 (IRDT)

Kalateh-ye Hajj Ali (Persian: كلاته حاج علي, also Romanized as Kalāteh-ye Ḩājj ‘Alī; also known as Ḩoseynābād, Kalāteh-ye Ḩājjī ‘Alī, and Kalāteh-ye Ḩoseynābād) is a village in Pain Velayat Rural District, Razaviyeh District, Mashhad County, Razavi Khorasan Province, Iran. At the 2006 census, its population was 108, in 30 families.
