= Dustabad, Fars =

Dustabad دوست اباد
- Village
- Location within Iran
- Coordinates: 30°07′23″N 53°35′28″E
- Country: Iran
- Province: Fars
- County: Bavanat
- Bakhsh: Sarchehan
- Rural District: Bagh Safa

Population (2006)
  - Total: 311
- Time zone: UTC+3:30 (IRST)
  - Summer (DST): UTC+4:30 (IRDT)

Dustabad (Persian: دوست اباد, also Romanized as Dūstābād; also known as Deh Jūqeh and Dojegheh Dūstāqād) is a village in Bagh Safa Rural District, Sarchehan District, Bavanat County, Fars province, Iran. At the 2006 census, its population was 311, in 73 families.
