= Golshanabad, Markazi =

Golshanabad گلشن اباد
- Village
- Location within Iran
- Coordinates: 33°55′28″N 49°41′47″E
- Country: Iran
- Province: Markazi
- County: Arak
- Bakhsh: Central
- Rural District: Shamsabad

Population (2006)
  - Total: 192
- Time zone: UTC+3:30 (IRST)
  - Summer (DST): UTC+4:30 (IRDT)

Golshanabad (Persian: گلشن اباد, also Romanized as Golshanābād) is a village in Shamsabad Rural District, in the Central District of Arak County, Markazi Province, Iran. At the 2006 census, its population was 192, in 46 families.
