= Qarah Jeqqeh, North Khorasan =

Qarah Jeqqeh قره جقه
- Village
- Location within Iran
- Coordinates: 37°04′30″N 58°11′12″E
- Country: Iran
- Province: North Khorasan
- County: Faruj
- Bakhsh: Central
- Rural District: Sangar

Population (2006)
  - Total: 160
- Time zone: UTC+3:30 (IRST)
  - Summer (DST): UTC+4:30 (IRDT)

Qarah Jeqqeh (Persian: قره جقه, also Romanized as Qarah Chaqqeh) is a village in Sangar Rural District, in the Central District of Faruj County, North Khorasan Province, Iran. At the 2006 census, its population was 160, in 38 families.
