= Chahab, Fars =

Chahab چاه اب
- Village
- Location within Iran
- Coordinates: 30°12′23″N 52°35′41″E
- Country: Iran
- Province: Fars
- County: Marvdasht
- Bakhsh: Dorudzan
- Rural District: Abarj

Population (2006)
  - Total: 30
- Time zone: UTC+3:30 (IRST)
  - Summer (DST): UTC+4:30 (IRDT)

Chahab (Persian: چاه اب, also Romanized as Chāhāb; also known as Chāh Āb-e Gol Mīān) is a village in Abarj Rural District, Dorudzan District, Marvdasht County, Fars province, Iran. At the 2006 census, its population was 30, in 4 families.
