= Li Chun (warlord) =

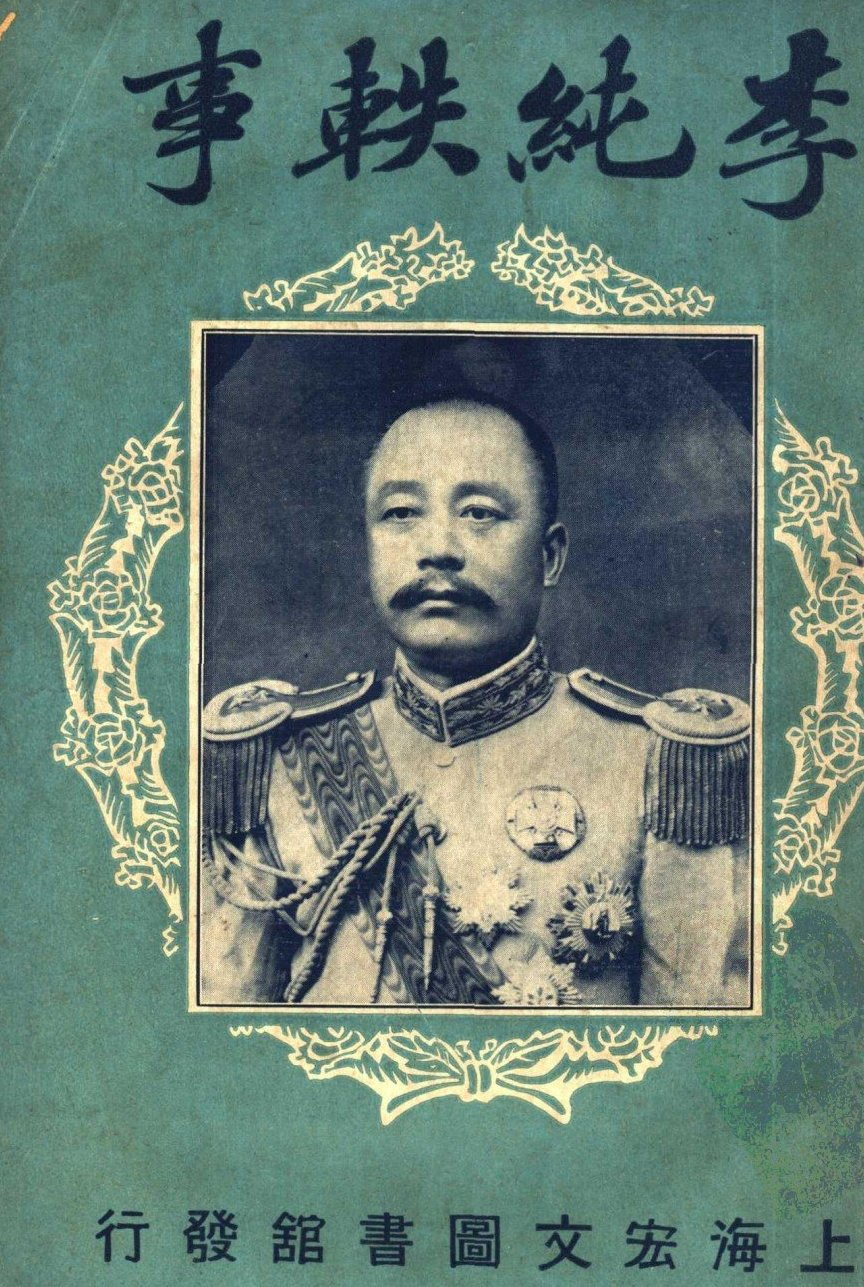
- Born: September 12, 1867
- Died: October 12, 1920
- Allegiance: Qing Dynasty (Beiyang government) Republic of China; Zhili clique
- Rank: General
- Battles / wars: Xinhai Revolution
- Awards: Order of Rank and Merit; Order of the Precious Brilliant Golden Grain; Order of Wen-Hu

Li Chun (September 12, 1867 – October 12, 1920) was a Chinese general of the Warlord Era of the Republic of China.

== Biography ==
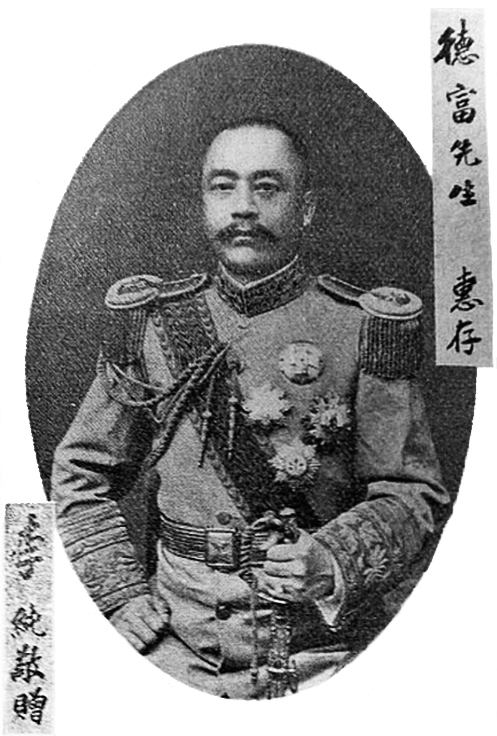
picture given by Li Chun to Tokutomi Soho.

During the 1911 Xinhai Revolution, he was part of the First Army, which fought against the revolutionaries of the Wuchang Uprising, commanding the 11th Brigade of the Beiyang Army's 6th Division. Li was promoted to command of the 6th Division after the previous commander, Wu Luzhen, was made acting governor of Shanxi.
