= Shirin Darreh Rural District =

Rural district in Razavi Khorasan province, Iran

Shirin Darreh Rural District Persian: دهستان شيرين دره
- Rural District
- Location within Iran
- Coordinates: 37°10′N 58°44′E
- Country: Iran
- Province: Razavi Khorasan
- County: Quchan
- District: Central
- Established: 1987
- Capital: Yusef Khan

Population (2016)
  - Total: 15,435
- Time zone: UTC+3:30 (IRST)

Shirin Darreh Rural District (Persian: دهستان شيرين دره) is in the Central District of Quchan County, Razavi Khorasan province, Iran. Its capital is the village of Yusef Khan. The previous capital of the rural district was the village of Mezerj, now a city.

== Demographics ==
=== Population ===
At the time of the 2006 National Census, the rural district's population was 15,898 in 3,832 households. There were 14,332 inhabitants in 3,999 households at the following census of 2011. The 2016 census measured the population of the rural district as 15,435 in 4,718 households. The most populous of its 31 villages was Mezerj (now a city), with 3,834 people.

=== Other villages in the rural district ===
- Allahian
- Aq Kariz
- Bad Khvor
- Hey Hey
- Pariabad
- Yadak
