= Sudlaneh Rural District =

Rural district in Razavi Khorasan province, Iran

Sudlaneh Rural District Persian: دهستان سودلانه
- Rural District
- Location within Iran
- Coordinates: 37°03′N 58°44′E
- Country: Iran
- Province: Razavi Khorasan
- County: Quchan
- District: Central
- Established: 1987
- Capital: Aliabad

Population (2016)
  - Total: 17,088
- Time zone: UTC+3:30 (IRST)

Sudlaneh Rural District (Persian: دهستان سودلانه) is in the Central District of Quchan County, Razavi Khorasan province, Iran. Its capital is the village of Aliabad.

== Demographics ==
=== Population ===
At the time of the 2006 National Census, the rural district's population was 18,985 in 4,512 households. There were 18,246 inhabitants in 5,043 households at the following census of 2011. The 2016 census measured the population of the rural district as 17,088 in 5,234 households. The most populous of its 48 villages was Farkhan-e Olya, with 2,062 people.

=== Other villages in the rural district ===
- Ab Shuri
- Dadanlu
- Dizadiz
- Dizavand
- Emarat
- Farkhan-e Kohneh
- Farkhan-e Shahrah
- Farkhan-e Sofla
- Guganlu
- Kachalanlu
- Kalateh-ye Archinabad
- Kalateh-ye Mirza Mohammad Ali
- Khalkanlu
- Navakh
- Qasemabad
- Zalabad
