= Dowlatkhaneh Rural District =

Rural district in Razavi Khorasan province, Iran

Dowlatkhaneh Rural District Persian: دهستان دولتخانه
- Rural District
- Location within Iran
- Coordinates: 37°26′N 58°33′E
- Country: Iran
- Province: Razavi Khorasan
- County: Quchan
- District: Bajgiran
- Established: 1987
- Capital: Emamqoli

Population (2016)
  - Total: 7,031
- Time zone: UTC+3:30 (IRST)

Dowlatkhaneh Rural District (Persian: دهستان دولتخانه) is in Bajgiran District of Quchan County, Razavi Khorasan province, Iran. Its capital is the village of Emamqoli.

== Demographics ==
=== Population ===
At the time of the 2006 National Census, the rural district's population was 9,285 in 2,441 households. There were 7,887 inhabitants in 2,382 households at the following census of 2011. The 2016 census measured the population of the rural district as 7,031 in 2,401 households. The most populous of its 33 villages was Shah Rag, with 788 people.

=== Other villages in the rural district ===
- Ab Jahan
- Bardar
- Eslamabad
- Jowzan
- Qach Kanlu
- Rahvard
- Yadegar
