= Dughayi Rural District =

Rural district in Razavi Khorasan province, Iran

Dughayi Rural District Persian: دهستان دوغائي
- Rural District
- Location within Iran
- Coordinates: 36°56′N 58°35′E
- Country: Iran
- Province: Razavi Khorasan
- County: Quchan
- District: Abkuh
- Established: 1987
- Capital: Dughayi

Population (2016)
  - Total: 11,704
- Time zone: UTC+3:30 (IRST)

Dughayi Rural District (Persian: دهستان دوغائي) is in Abkuh District of Quchan County, Razavi Khorasan province, Iran. Its capital is the village of Dughayi. The previous capital of the rural district was the village of Almajeq, now a city.

== Demographics ==
=== Population ===
At the time of the 2006 National Census, the rural district's population (as a part of the Central District) was 13,180 in 3,297 households. There were 11,857 inhabitants in 3,445 households at the following census of 2011. The 2016 census measured the population of the rural district as 11,704 in 3,688 households. The most populous of its 73 villages was Dughayi, with 1,128 people.

In 2020, the rural district was separated from the district in the formation of Abkuh District.

=== Other villages in the rural district ===
- Ab Gorg
- Atarchi
- Beniabid
- Besh Aghaj
- Borselan
- Chah Ab
- Davodli
- Dulu
- Dustabad
- Eslamabad
- Gol Mim
- Gol Mokharan
- Jafarabad-e Olya
- Kalateh-ye Azim
- Kalateh-ye Fathabad-e Sharqi
- Kalateh-ye Hajji Ali Dad
- Kalateh-ye Malu
- Kalateh-ye Reza Khan
- Kalateh-ye Yesaval Bashi
- Kallar
- Kheyrabad-e Sharqi
- Kotlar
- Mohammadabad-e Sharqi
- Qaleh-ye Abbas
- Qarah Chay
- Qarah Jeqqeh
- Qeshlaq
- Shurcheh
- Tavakkol Bagh
- Yasaqi
- Yengeh Qaleh-ye Havadanlu
