= Bajgiran District =

District in Razavi Khorasan province, Iran

Bajgiran District Persian: بخش باجگیران
- District
- Location within Iran
- Coordinates: 37°26′N 58°33′E
- Country: Iran
- Province: Razavi Khorasan
- County: Quchan
- Capital: Bajgiran

Population (2016)
  - Total: 7,625
- Time zone: UTC+3:30 (IRST)

Bajgiran District (Persian: بخش باجگیران) is in Quchan County, Razavi Khorasan province, Iran. Its capital is the city of Bajgiran.

== Demographics ==
=== Population ===
At the time of the 2006 National Census, the district's population was 10,038 in 2,658 households. The following census in 2011 counted 8,293 people in 2,505 households. The 2016 census measured the population of the district as 7,625 inhabitants in 2,589 households.

=== Administrative divisions ===
Bajgiran District Population
Administrative Divisions	2006	2011	2016
Dowlatkhaneh RD	9,285	7,887	7,031
Bajgiran (city)	753	406	594
Total	10,038	8,293	7,625
RD = Rural District
