= Abkuh District =

District in Razavi Khorasan province, Iran

Abkuh District Persian: بخش آبکوه
- District
- Location within Iran
- Coordinates: 36°50′N 58°37′E
- Country: Iran
- Province: Razavi Khorasan
- County: Quchan
- Established: 2020
- Capital: Almajeq
- Time zone: UTC+3:30 (IRST)

Abkuh District (Persian: بخش آبکوه) is in Quchan County, Razavi Khorasan province, Iran. Its capital is the city of Almajeq, whose population at the time of the 2016 National Census was 1,588 people in 463 households.

== History ==
In 2020, Dughayi Rural District was separated from the Central District in the formation of Abkuh District. The village of Almajeq was converted to a city in 2021.

== Demographics ==
=== Administrative divisions ===
Abkuh District
Administrative Divisions
Bahar RD
Dughayi RD
Almajeq (city) (Note: Became a city after the 2016 census)
RD = Rural District
