= Central District (Quchan County) =

District in Razavi Khorasan province, Iran

Central District (Quchan County) Persian: بخش مرکزی شهرستان قوچان
- District
- Location within Iran
- Coordinates: 37°08′N 58°44′E
- Country: Iran
- Province: Razavi Khorasan
- County: Quchan
- Capital: Quchan

Population (2016)
  - Total: 166,868
- Time zone: UTC+3:30 (IRST)

The Central District of Quchan County (Persian: بخش مرکزی شهرستان قوچان) is in Razavi Khorasan province, Iran. Its capital is the city of Quchan.

== History ==
In 2020, Dughayi Rural District was separated from the district in the formation of Abkuh District, and likewise Quchan Atiq Rural District to form Quchan Atiq District. The village of Mezerj was converted to a city in 2021.

== Demographics ==
=== Population ===
At the time of the 2006 National Census, the district's population was 169,575 in 42,844 households. The following census in 2011 counted 171,421 people in 48,588 households. The 2016 census measured the population of the district as 166,868 inhabitants in 50,260 households.

=== Administrative divisions ===
Central District (Quchan County) Population
Administrative Divisions	2006	2011	2016
Dughayi RD (Note: Transferred to Abkuh District after the 2016 census)	13,180	11,857	11,704
Quchan Atiq RD (Note: Transferred to Quchan Atiq District after the 2016 census)	24,559	23,226	21,037
Shirin Darreh RD	15,898	14,332	15,435
Sudlaneh RD	18,985	18,246	17,088
Mezerj (city) (Note: Became a city after the 2016 census)			
Quchan (city)	96,953	103,760	101,604
Total	169,575	171,421	166,868
RD = Rural District
