= Quchan County =

County in Razavi Khorasan province, Iran

Quchan County Persian: شهرستان قوچان
- County
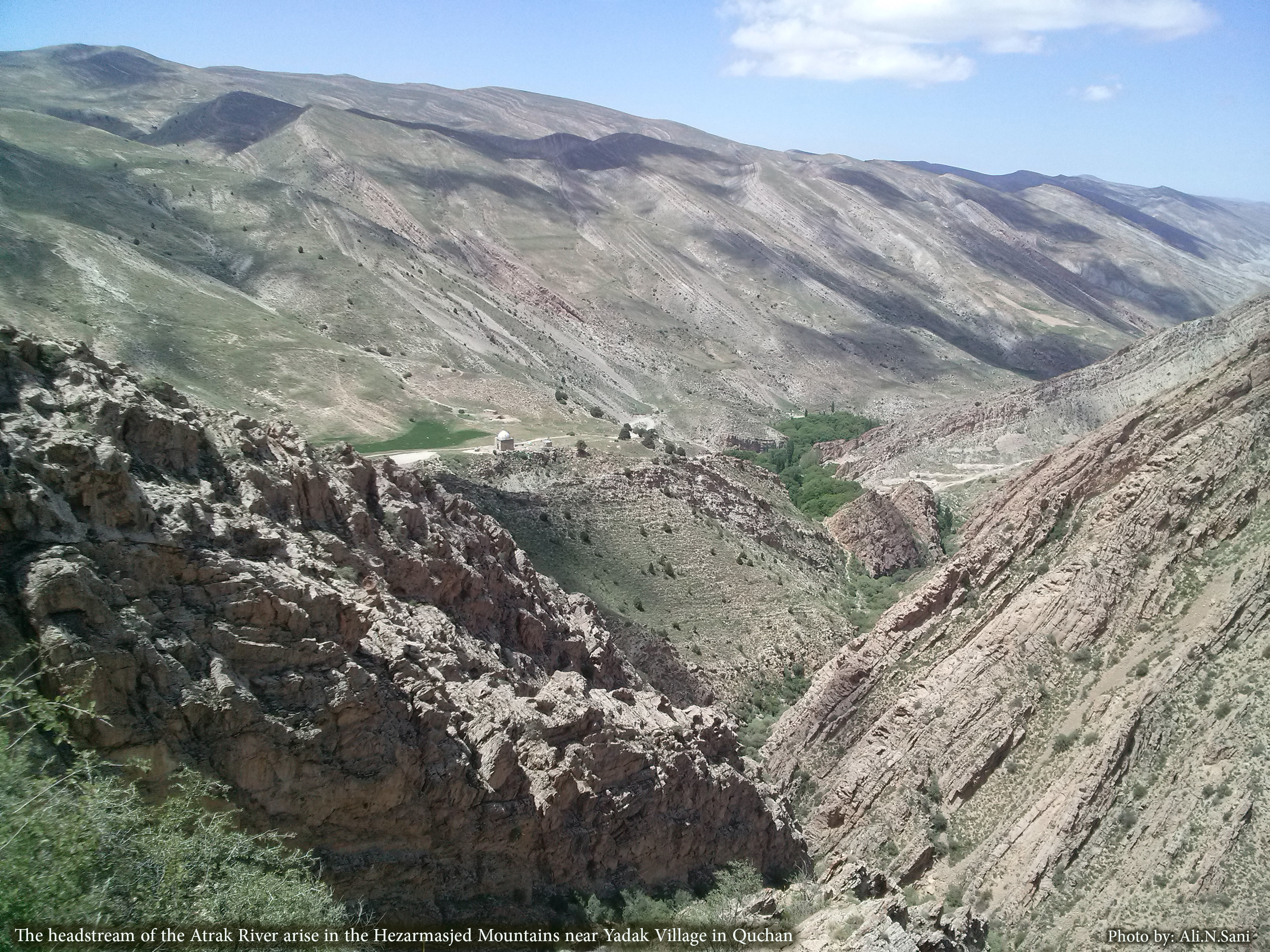
- Landscape near Yadak village, Quchan County

- Location of Quchan County in Razavi Khorasan province (top left, green)

- Location of Razavi Khorasan province in Iran
- Coordinates: 37°09′N 58°35′E
- Country: Iran
- Province: Razavi Khorasan
- Capital: Quchan
- Districts: Central, Abkuh, Bajgiran, Quchan Atiq

Area
  - Total: 3,848 km^{2} (1,486 sq mi)

Population (2016)
  - Total: 174,495
  - Density: 45.35/km^{2} (117.4/sq mi)
- Time zone: UTC+3:30 (IRST)

Quchan County (Persian: شهرستان قوچان) is in Razavi Khorasan province, Iran. Its capital is the city of Quchan.

== History ==
Until 2004, Quchan County had three districts: The Central, Bajgiran, and Faruj Districts, the latter of which was separated from the county in the establishment of Faruj County of North Khorasan province.

In 2020, Dughayi Rural District was separated from the Central District in the formation of Abkuh District, including the new Bahar Rural District. At the same time, Quchan Atiq Rural District was also separated from the Central District to form Quchan Atiq District, including the new Yazdan Rural District.

In 2021, the villages of Almajeq, Mezerj, and Shahr-e Kohneh were converted to cities.

== Demographics ==
=== Population ===
At the time of the 2006 National Census, the county's population was 179,613 in 45,502 households. The following census in 2011 counted 179,714 people in 51,045 households. The 2016 census measured the population of the county as 174,495 in 52,851 households.

=== Administrative divisions ===
Quchan County's population history and administrative structure over three consecutive censuses are shown in the following table.

Quchan County Population
Administrative Divisions	2006	2011	2016
Central District	169,575	171,421	166,868
Dughayi RD	13,180	11,857	11,704
Quchan Atiq RD	24,559	23,226	21,037
Shirin Darreh RD	15,898	14,332	15,435
Sudlaneh RD	18,985	18,246	17,088
Mezerj (city) (Note: Became a city after the 2016 census)			
Quchan (city)	96,953	103,760	101,604
Abkuh District (Note: Established after the 2016 census)			
Bahar RD			
Dughayi RD			
Almajeq (city) (Note: Became a city after the 2016 census)			
Bajgiran District	10,038	8,293	7,625
Dowlatkhaneh RD	9,285	7,887	7,031
Bajgiran (city)	753	406	594
Quchan Atiq District (Note: Established after the 2016 census)			
Quchan Atiq RD			
Yazdan RD			
Shahr-e Kohneh (city)			
Total	179,613	179,714	174,495
RD = Rural District

== See also ==
Media related to Quchan County at Wikimedia Commons
