= Akbarabad, Esfarayen =

Village in North Khorasan province, Iran

Akbarabad Persian: اكبراباد
- Village
- Location within Iran
- Coordinates: 37°07′31″N 57°18′45″E
- Country: Iran
- Province: North Khorasan
- County: Esfarayen
- District: Zorqabad
- Rural District: Daman Kuh

Population (2016)
  - Total: 19
- Time zone: UTC+3:30 (IRST)

Akbarabad (Persian: اكبراباد) (Note: Also romanized as Akbarābād) is a village in Daman Kuh Rural District of Zorqabad District in Esfarayen County, North Khorasan province, Iran.

== Demographics ==
=== Population ===
At the time of the 2006 National Census, the village's population was 29 in seven households, when it was in the Central District. The following census in 2011 counted 32 people in eight households. The 2016 census measured the population of the village as 19 people in six households.

In 2023, the rural district was separated from the district in the formation of Zorqabad District.
