= Naqiabad, North Khorasan =

Village in North Khorasan province, Iran

Naqiabad Persian: نقي اباد
- Village
- Location within Iran
- Coordinates: 37°02′00″N 57°22′50″E
- Country: Iran
- Province: North Khorasan
- County: Esfarayen
- District: Zorqabad
- Rural District: Zorqabad

Population (2016)
  - Total: 211
- Time zone: UTC+3:30 (IRST)

Naqiabad (Persian: نقی‌آباد) (Note: Also romanized as Naqīābād; also known as Taqīābād (تقی‌آباد)) is a village in Zorqabad Rural District of Zorqabad District in Esfarayen County, North Khorasan province, Iran.

== Demographics ==
=== Population ===
At the time of the 2006 National Census, the village's population was 285 in 67 households, when it was in the Central District. The following census in 2011 counted 248 people in 71 households. The 2016 census measured the population of the village as 211 people in 66 households.

In 2023, the rural district was separated from the district in the formation of Zorqabad District.
