= Mehdiabad, North Khorasan =

Village in North Khorasan province, Iran

Mehdiabad Persian: مهدي اباد
- Village
- Location within Iran
- Coordinates: 37°01′04″N 57°09′52″E
- Country: Iran
- Province: North Khorasan
- County: Esfarayen
- District: Zorqabad
- Rural District: Zorqabad

Population (2016)
  - Total: 77
- Time zone: UTC+3:30 (IRST)

Mehdiabad (Persian: مهدي اباد) (Note: Also romanized as Mehdīābād) is a village in Zorqabad Rural District of Zorqabad District in Esfarayen County, North Khorasan province, Iran.

== Demographics ==
=== Population ===
At the time of the 2006 National Census, the village's population was 103 in 27 households, when it was in the Central District. The following census in 2011 counted 100 people in 29 households. The 2016 census measured the population of the village as 77 people in 31 households.

In 2023, the rural district was separated from the district in the formation of Zorqabad District.
