= Kalateh-ye Nish Kesh =

Village in North Khorasan province, Iran

Kalateh-ye Nish Kesh Persian: كلاته نيش كش
- Village
- Location within Iran
- Coordinates: 37°01′37″N 57°11′48″E
- Country: Iran
- Province: North Khorasan
- County: Esfarayen
- District: Zorqabad
- Rural District: Zorqabad

Population (2016)
  - Total: 37
- Time zone: UTC+3:30 (IRST)

Kalateh-ye Nish Kesh (Persian: كلاته نيش كش) (Note: Also romanized as Kalāteh-ye Nīsh Kesh; also known as Kalāteh-ye Nīsh Kīsh, Nīsh Kash, Nīsh Kesh, and Nīshkish) is a village in Zorqabad Rural District of Zorqabad District in Esfarayen County, North Khorasan province, Iran.

== Demographics ==
=== Population ===
At the time of the 2006 National Census, the village's population was 62 in 15 households, when it was in the Central District. The following census in 2011 counted 67 people in 18 households. The 2016 census measured the population of the village as 37 people in 12 households.

In 2023, the rural district was separated from the district in the formation of Zorqabad District.
