= Gurpan =

Village in North Khorasan province, Iran

Gurpan Persian: گورپان
- Village
- Location within Iran
- Coordinates: 36°57′37″N 57°14′11″E
- Country: Iran
- Province: North Khorasan
- County: Esfarayen
- District: Zorqabad
- Rural District: Zorqabad

Population (2016)
  - Total: 109
- Time zone: UTC+3:30 (IRST)

Gurpan (Persian: گورپان) (Note: Also romanized as Gūrpān; also known as Jowrfān and Jūrfān) is a village in Zorqabad Rural District of Zorqabad District in Esfarayen County, North Khorasan province, Iran.

== Demographics ==
=== Population ===
At the time of the 2006 National Census, the village's population was 195 in 57 households, when it was in the Central District. The following census in 2011 counted 169 people in 52 households. The 2016 census measured the population of the village as 109 people in 41 households.

In 2023, the rural district was separated from the district in the formation of Zorqabad District.
