= Kalateh-ye Alimardan =

Village in North Khorasan province, Iran

Kalateh-ye Alimardan Persian: كلاته عليمردان
- Village
- Location within Iran
- Coordinates: 37°01′53″N 57°11′59″E
- Country: Iran
- Province: North Khorasan
- County: Esfarayen
- District: Zorqabad
- Rural District: Zorqabad

Population (2016)
  - Total: 86
- Time zone: UTC+3:30 (IRST)

Kalateh-ye Alimardan (Persian: كلاته عليمردان) (Note: Also romanized as Kalāteh-ye ‘Alīmardān; also known as Kalāteh-ye ‘Alī and Kalāteh-ye ‘Alīmardānkhān) is a village in Zorqabad Rural District of Zorqabad District in Esfarayen County, North Khorasan province, Iran.

== Demographics ==
=== Population ===
At the time of the 2006 National Census, the village's population was 158 in 34 households, when it was in the Central District. The following census in 2011 counted 149 people in 39 households. The 2016 census measured the population of the village as 86 people in 27 households.

In 2023, the rural district was separated from the district in the formation of Zorqabad District.
