= Khaledabad, North Khorasan =

Village in North Khorasan province, Iran

Khaledabad Persian: خالداباد
- Village
- Location within Iran
- Coordinates: 37°04′07″N 57°01′01″E
- Country: Iran
- Province: North Khorasan
- County: Esfarayen
- District: Zorqabad
- Rural District: Daman Kuh

Population (2016)
  - Total: 1,006
- Time zone: UTC+3:30 (IRST)

Khaledabad (Persian: خالداباد) (Note: Also romanized as Khāledābād; also known as Eskandarābād) is a village in Daman Kuh Rural District of Zorqabad District in Esfarayen County, North Khorasan province, Iran.

== Demographics ==
=== Population ===
At the time of the 2006 National Census, the village's population was 1,208 in 275 households, when it was in the Central District. The following census in 2011 counted 1,120 people in 313 households. The 2016 census measured the population of the village as 1,006 people in 292 households.

In 2023, the rural district was separated from the district in the formation of Zorqabad District.
