= Kalateh-ye Mansurabad =

Village in North Khorasan province, Iran

Kalateh-ye Mansurabad Persian: كلاته منصوراباد
- Village
- Country: Iran
- Province: North Khorasan
- County: Esfarayen
- District: Zorqabad
- Rural District: Daman Kuh

Population (2016)
  - Total: 13
- Time zone: UTC+3:30 (IRST)

Kalateh-ye Mansurabad (Persian: كلاته منصوراباد) (Note: Also romanized as Kalāteh-ye Manṣūrābād) is a village in Daman Kuh Rural District of Zorqabad District in Esfarayen County, North Khorasan province, Iran.

== Demographics ==
=== Population ===
At the time of the 2006 National Census, the village's population was 23 in five households, when it was in the Central District. The following census in 2011 counted 13 people in five households. The 2016 census measured the population of the village as 13 people in five households.

In 2023, the rural district was separated from the district in the formation of Zorqabad District.
