= Zari, Iran =

Village in North Khorasan province, Iran

Zari Persian: زاري
- Village
- Location within Iran
- Coordinates: 37°08′16″N 57°08′54″E
- Country: Iran
- Province: North Khorasan
- County: Esfarayen
- District: Zorqabad
- Rural District: Daman Kuh

Population (2016)
  - Total: 184
- Time zone: UTC+3:30 (IRST)

Zari (Persian: زاري) (Note: Also romanized as Zārī) is a village in Daman Kuh Rural District of Zorqabad District in Esfarayen County, North Khorasan province, Iran.

== Demographics ==
=== Population ===
At the time of the 2006 National Census, the village's population was 285 in 61 households, when it was in the Central District. The following census in 2011 counted 286 people in 68 households. The 2016 census measured the population of the village as 184 people in 51 households.

In 2023, the rural district was separated from the district in the formation of Zorqabad District.
