= Gazrabi =

Village in North Khorasan province, Iran

Gazrabi Persian: گزرابي
- Village
- Location within Iran
- Coordinates: 36°59′25″N 57°15′03″E
- Country: Iran
- Province: North Khorasan
- County: Esfarayen
- District: Zorqabad
- Rural District: Zorqabad

Population (2016)
  - Total: 30
- Time zone: UTC+3:30 (IRST)

Gazrabi (Persian: گزرابي) (Note: Also romanized as Gazrābī) is a village in Zorqabad Rural District of Zorqabad District in Esfarayen County, North Khorasan province, Iran.

== Demographics ==
=== Population ===
At the time of the 2006 National Census, the village's population was 59 in 15 households, when it was in the Central District. The following census in 2011 counted 49 people in 15 households. The 2016 census measured the population of the village as 30 people in 12 households.

In 2023, the rural district was separated from the district in the formation of Zorqabad District.
