= Zamanabad, North Khorasan =

Village in North Khorasan province, Iran

Zamanabad Persian: زمان اباد
- Village
- Location within Iran
- Coordinates: 36°58′45″N 57°11′48″E
- Country: Iran
- Province: North Khorasan
- County: Esfarayen
- District: Zorqabad
- Rural District: Zorqabad

Population (2016)
  - Total: 0
- Time zone: UTC+3:30 (IRST)

Zamanabad (Persian: زمان اباد) (Note: Also romanized as Zamānābād) is a village in Zorqabad Rural District of Zorqabad District in Esfarayen County, North Khorasan province, Iran.

== Demographics ==
=== Population ===
At the time of the 2006 National Census, the village's population was 13 in five households, when it was in the Central District. The village did not appear in the following census of 2011. The 2016 census measured the population of the village as zero.

In 2023, the rural district was separated from the district in the formation of Zorqabad District.
