= Derazpey =

Village in North Khorasan province, Iran

Derazpey Persian: درازپي
- Village
- Location within Iran
- Coordinates: 37°03′42″N 57°23′56″E
- Country: Iran
- Province: North Khorasan
- County: Esfarayen
- District: Zorqabad
- Rural District: Zorqabad

Population (2016)
  - Total: 95
- Time zone: UTC+3:30 (IRST)

Derazpey (Persian: درازپي) (Note: Also romanized as Derāzpey; also known as Dezh Asbī) is a village in Zorqabad Rural District of Zorqabad District in Esfarayen County, North Khorasan province, Iran.

== Demographics ==
=== Population ===
At the time of the 2006 National Census, the village's population was 116 in 33 households, when it was in the Central District. The following census in 2011 counted 118 people in 38 households. The 2016 census measured the population of the village as 95 people in 33 households.

In 2023, the rural district was separated from the district in the formation of Zorqabad District.
