= Rahimabad, Esfarayen =

Village in North Khorasan province, Iran

Rahimabad Persian: رحيم اباد
- Village
- Location within Iran
- Coordinates: 37°03′28″N 57°22′28″E
- Country: Iran
- Province: North Khorasan
- County: Esfarayen
- District: Zorqabad
- Rural District: Zorqabad

Population (2016)
  - Total: 98
- Time zone: UTC+3:30 (IRST)

Rahimabad (Persian: رحيم اباد) (Note: Also romanized as Raḩīmābād) is a village in Zorqabad Rural District of Zorqabad District in Esfarayen County, North Khorasan province, Iran.

== Demographics ==
=== Population ===
At the time of the 2006 National Census, the village's population was 126 in 30 households, when it was in the Central District. The following census in 2011 counted 112 people in 33 households. The 2016 census measured the population of the village as 98 people in 31 households.

In 2023, the rural district was separated from the district in the formation of Zorqabad District.
