= Emarat, Esfarayen =

Village in North Khorasan province, Iran

Emarat Persian: عمارت
- Village
- Location within Iran
- Coordinates: 37°03′15″N 57°13′06″E
- Country: Iran
- Province: North Khorasan
- County: Esfarayen
- District: Zorqabad
- Rural District: Zorqabad

Population (2016)
  - Total: 269
- Time zone: UTC+3:30 (IRST)

Emarat (Persian: عمارت) (Note: Also romanized as ‘Emārat) is a village in Zorqabad Rural District of Zorqabad District in Esfarayen County, North Khorasan province, Iran.

== Demographics ==
=== Population ===
At the time of the 2006 National Census, the village's population was 358 in 90 households, when it was in the Central District. The following census in 2011 counted 309 people in 85 households. The 2016 census measured the population of the village as 269 people in 95 households.

In 2023, the rural district was separated from the district in the formation of Zorqabad District.
