= Chehel Hesar =

Village in North Khorasan province, Iran

Chehel Hesar Persian: چهل حصار
- Village
- Location within Iran
- Coordinates: 37°02′33″N 57°24′39″E
- Country: Iran
- Province: North Khorasan
- County: Esfarayen
- District: Zorqabad
- Rural District: Zorqabad

Population (2016)
  - Total: 1,143
- Time zone: UTC+3:30 (IRST)

Chehel Hesar (Persian: چهل حصار) (Note: Also romanized as Chehel Ḩeşār) is a village in Zorqabad Rural District of Zorqabad District in Esfarayen County, North Khorasan province, Iran.

== Demographics ==
=== Population ===
At the time of the 2006 National Census, the village's population was 1,396 in 321 households, when it was in the Central District. The following census in 2011 counted 1,374 people in 382 households. The 2016 census measured the population of the village as 1,143 people in 344 households, the most populous in its rural district.

In 2023, the rural district was separated from the district in the formation of Zorqabad District.
