= Mehrabad, North Khorasan =

Village in North Khorasan province, Iran

Mehrabad Persian: مهراباد
- Village
- Location within Iran
- Coordinates: 37°05′00″N 57°15′25″E
- Country: Iran
- Province: North Khorasan
- County: Esfarayen
- District: Zorqabad
- Rural District: Zorqabad

Population (2016)
  - Total: 376
- Time zone: UTC+3:30 (IRST)

Mehrabad (Persian: مهراباد) (Note: Also romanized as Mehrābād; also known as Kalāteh-ye Gholāmḩoseyn Khān) is a village in Zorqabad Rural District of Zorqabad District in Esfarayen County, North Khorasan province, Iran.

== Demographics ==
=== Population ===
At the time of the 2006 National Census, the village's population was 572 in 122 households, when it was in the Central District. The following census in 2011 counted 540 people in 135 households. The 2016 census measured the population of the village as 376 people in 120 households.

In 2023, the rural district was separated from the district in the formation of Zorqabad District.
