= Kalateh-ye Mirza =

Kalateh-ye Mirza (Persian: كلاته ميرزا) may refer to:

- Kalateh-ye Mirza, Semnan, Semnan province
- Kalateh-ye Mirza, Darmian, South Khorasan province
- Kalateh-ye Mirza, Khusf, South Khorasan province
- Rahmatabad, Ferdows, a village also known as Kalateh-ye Mirza, South Khorasan province

== See also ==
- Kalateh-ye Mirza Abbas
- Kalateh-ye Mirza Jani
- Kalateh-ye Mirza Mohammad Ali
- Kalateh-ye Mirza Rajab
- Kalateh-ye Mirza Rahim
