= Nish Kesh, Iran =

Village in North Khorasan province, Iran

Nish Kesh Persian: نيش كش
- Village
- Location within Iran
- Coordinates: 37°01′36″N 57°17′21″E
- Country: Iran
- Province: North Khorasan
- County: Esfarayen
- District: Zorqabad
- Rural District: Zorqabad

Population (2016)
  - Total: 90
- Time zone: UTC+3:30 (IRST)

Nish Kesh (Persian: نيش كش) (Note: Also romanized as Nīsh Kesh; also known as Nish Kish, also romanized as Nīsh Kīsh) is a village in Zorqabad Rural District of Zorqabad District in Esfarayen County, North Khorasan province, Iran.

== Demographics ==
=== Population ===
At the time of the 2006 National Census, the village's population was 135 in 35 households, when it was in the Central District. The following census in 2011 counted 152 people in 47 households. The 2016 census measured the population of the village as 90 people in 29 households.

In 2023, the rural district was separated from the district in the formation of Zorqabad District.
