= Hoseynabad-e Kordha, North Khorasan =

Village in North Khorasan province, Iran

Hoseynabad-e Kordha Persian: حسين ابادكردها
- Village
- Location within Iran
- Coordinates: 37°01′19″N 57°23′12″E
- Country: Iran
- Province: North Khorasan
- County: Esfarayen
- District: Zorqabad
- Rural District: Zorqabad

Population (2016)
  - Total: 185
- Time zone: UTC+3:30 (IRST)

Hoseynabad-e Kordha (Persian: حسين ابادكردها) (Note: Also romanized as Ḩoseynābād-e Kordhā) is a village in Zorqabad Rural District of Zorqabad District in Esfarayen County, North Khorasan province, Iran.

== Demographics ==
=== Population ===
At the time of the 2006 National Census, the village's population was 274 in 60 households, when it was in the Central District. The following census in 2011 counted 257 people in 62 households. The 2016 census measured the population of the village as 185 people in 57 households.

In 2023, the rural district was separated from the district in the formation of Zorqabad District.
