= Qaleh Now-ye Anqolabi =

Village in North Khorasan province, Iran

Qaleh Now-ye Anqolabi Persian: قلعه نوانقلابي
- Village
- Location within Iran
- Coordinates: 37°01′23″N 57°18′11″E
- Country: Iran
- Province: North Khorasan
- County: Esfarayen
- District: Zorqabad
- Rural District: Zorqabad

Population (2016)
  - Total: 89
- Time zone: UTC+3:30 (IRST)

Qaleh Now-ye Anqolabi (Persian: قلعه نوانقلابي) (Note: Also romanized as Qal’eh Now-ye Ānqolābī; also known as Qal’eh Now, Qal‘eh Now-e Ra’īsī, and Qal‘eh Now-ye Ra’īsī (قلعه نورئيسي)) is a village in Zorqabad Rural District of Zorqabad District in Esfarayen County, North Khorasan province, Iran.

== Demographics ==
=== Population ===
At the time of the 2006 National Census, the village's population was 142 in 40 households, when it was in the Central District. The following census in 2011 counted 117 people in 36 households. The 2016 census measured the population of the village as 89 people in 32 households.

In 2023, the rural district was separated from the district in the formation of Zorqabad District.
