= Hebsabad =

Village in North Khorasan province, Iran

Hebsabad Persian: حبس اباد
- Village
- Location within Iran
- Coordinates: 37°03′57″N 57°01′13″E
- Country: Iran
- Province: North Khorasan
- County: Esfarayen
- District: Zorqabad
- Rural District: Daman Kuh

Population (2016)
  - Total: 276
- Time zone: UTC+3:30 (IRST)

Astin (Persian: استين) (Note: Also romanized as Astīn; also known as Āshe‘īn, Astain, Asta‘īn, and Esta‘īn) is a village in Daman Kuh Rural District of Zorqabad District in Esfarayen County, North Khorasan province, Iran.

== Demographics ==
=== Population ===
At the time of the 2006 National Census, the village's population was 369 in 65 households, when it was in the Central District. The following census in 2011 counted 290 people in 74 households. The 2016 census measured the population of the village as 276 people in 79 households.

In 2023, the rural district was separated from the district in the formation of Zorqabad District.
