= Aliabad, Esfarayen =

Village in North Khorasan province, Iran

Aliabad Persian: علي اباد
- Village
- Location within Iran
- Coordinates: 37°01′59″N 57°12′53″E
- Country: Iran
- Province: North Khorasan
- County: Esfarayen
- District: Zorqabad
- Rural District: Zorqabad

Population (2016)
  - Total: 111
- Time zone: UTC+3:30 (IRST)

Aliabad (Persian: علي اباد) (Note: Also romanized as ‘Alīābād) is a village in Zorqabad Rural District of Zorqabad District in Esfarayen County, North Khorasan province, Iran.

== Demographics ==
=== Population ===
At the time of the 2006 National Census, the village's population was 200 in 49 households, when it was in the Central District. The following census in 2011 counted 164 people in 43 households. The 2016 census measured the population of the village as 111 people in 34 households.

In 2023, the rural district was separated from the district in the formation of Zorqabad District.
