= Jafarabad, Esfarayen =

Village in North Khorasan province, Iran

Jafarabad Persian: جعفراباد
- Village
- Location within Iran
- Coordinates: 37°04′23″N 57°05′43″E
- Country: Iran
- Province: North Khorasan
- County: Esfarayen
- District: Zorqabad
- Rural District: Daman Kuh

Population (2016)
  - Total: 120
- Time zone: UTC+3:30 (IRST)

Jafarabad (Persian: جعفراباد) (Note: Also romanized as Ja‘farābād) is a village in Daman Kuh Rural District of Zorqabad District in Esfarayen County, North Khorasan province, Iran.

== Demographics ==
=== Population ===
At the time of the 2006 National Census, the village's population was 127 in 30 households, when it was in the Central District. The following census in 2011 counted 124 people in 33 households. The 2016 census measured the population of the village as 120 people in 39 households.

In 2023, the rural district was separated from the district in the formation of Zorqabad District.
