= Kalateh-ye Khvosh, North Khorasan =

Village in North Khorasan province, Iran

Kalateh-ye Khvosh Persian: كلاته خوش
- Village
- Location within Iran
- Coordinates: 37°06′17″N 57°16′46″E
- Country: Iran
- Province: North Khorasan
- County: Esfarayen
- District: Zorqabad
- Rural District: Daman Kuh

Population (2016)
  - Total: 189
- Time zone: UTC+3:30 (IRST)

Kalateh-ye Khvosh (Persian: كلاته خوش) (Note: Also romanized as Kalāteh-ye Khvosh) is a village in Daman Kuh Rural District of Zorqabad District in Esfarayen County, North Khorasan province, Iran.

== Demographics ==
=== Population ===
At the time of the 2006 National Census, the village's population was 331 in 89 households, when it was in the Central District. The following census in 2011 counted 299 people in 86 households. The 2016 census measured the population of the village as 189 people in 56 households.

In 2023, the rural district was separated from the district in the formation of Zorqabad District.
