= Hoseynabad-e Khankowr =

Village in North Khorasan province, Iran

Hoseynabad-e Khankowr Persian: حسين ابادخانكور
- Village
- Location within Iran
- Coordinates: 37°05′13″N 57°06′42″E
- Country: Iran
- Province: North Khorasan
- County: Esfarayen
- District: Zorqabad
- Rural District: Daman Kuh

Population (2016)
  - Total: 173
- Time zone: UTC+3:30 (IRST)

Hoseynabad-e Khankowr (Persian: حسين ابادخانكور) (Note: Also romanized as Ḩoseynābād-e Khānḵowr; also known as Ḩoseynābād and Khāneh Kūr) is a village in Daman Kuh Rural District of Zorqabad District in Esfarayen County, North Khorasan province, Iran.

== Demographics ==
=== Population ===
At the time of the 2006 National Census, the village's population was 85 in 22 households, when it was in the Central District. The following census in 2011 counted 89 people in 25 households. The 2016 census measured the population of the village as 173 people in 56 households.

In 2023, the rural district was separated from the district in the formation of Zorqabad District.
