= Dehak, North Khorasan =

Village in North Khorasan province, Iran

Dehak Persian: دهك
- Village
- Location within Iran
- Coordinates: 37°08′49″N 57°04′56″E
- Country: Iran
- Province: North Khorasan
- County: Esfarayen
- District: Zorqabad
- Rural District: Daman Kuh

Population (2016)
  - Total: 297
- Time zone: UTC+3:30 (IRST)

Dehak (Persian: دهك) (Note: Also known as Dehik and Dehīk) is a village in Daman Kuh Rural District of Zorqabad District in Esfarayen County, North Khorasan province, Iran.

== Demographics ==
=== Population ===
At the time of the 2006 National Census, the village's population was 263 in 53 households, when it was in the Central District. The following census in 2011 counted 216 people in 60 households. The 2016 census measured the population of the village as 297 people in 83 households.

In 2023, the rural district was separated from the district in the formation of Zorqabad District.
