= Kalateh-ye Molla Aziz =

Village in North Khorasan province, Iran

Kalateh-ye Molla Aziz Persian: كلاته ملاعزيز
- Village
- Location within Iran
- Coordinates: 37°07′19″N 57°16′29″E
- Country: Iran
- Province: North Khorasan
- County: Esfarayen
- District: Zorqabad
- Rural District: Daman Kuh

Population (2016)
  - Total: 71
- Time zone: UTC+3:30 (IRST)

Kalateh-ye Molla Aziz (Persian: كلاته ملاعزيز) (Note: Also romanized as Kalāteh-ye Mollā ‘Azīz) is a village in Daman Kuh Rural District of Zorqabad District in Esfarayen County, North Khorasan province, Iran.

== Demographics ==
=== Population ===
At the time of the 2006 National Census, the village's population was 103 in 25 households, when it was in the Central District. The following census in 2011 counted 94 people in 31 households. The 2016 census measured the population of the village as 71 people in 20 households.

In 2023, the rural district was separated from the district in the formation of Zorqabad District.
