= Sorkh Cheshmeh, North Khorasan =

Village in North Khorasan province, Iran

Sorkh Cheshmeh Persian: سرخ چشمه
- Village
- Location within Iran
- Coordinates: 36°58′52″N 56°54′53″E
- Country: Iran
- Province: North Khorasan
- County: Esfarayen
- District: Zorqabad
- Rural District: Zorqabad

Population (2016)
  - Total: 17
- Time zone: UTC+3:30 (IRST)

Sorkh Cheshmeh (Persian: سرخ چشمه) (Note: Also romanized as Sorkh Cheshmeh; also known as Sorkheh Cheshmeh) is a village in Zorqabad Rural District of Zorqabad District in Esfarayen County, North Khorasan province, Iran.

== Demographics ==
=== Population ===
At the time of the 2006 National Census, the village's population was 47 in 15 households, when it was in the Central District. The following census in 2011 counted 27 people in 10 households. The 2016 census measured the population of the village as 17 people in nine households.

In 2023, the rural district was separated from the district in the formation of Zorqabad District.
