= Firuziyeh =

Village in North Khorasan province, Iran

Firuziyeh Persian: فيروزيه
- Village
- Location within Iran
- Coordinates: 37°06′39″N 57°14′28″E
- Country: Iran
- Province: North Khorasan
- County: Esfarayen
- District: Zorqabad
- Rural District: Daman Kuh

Population (2016)
  - Total: 158
- Time zone: UTC+3:30 (IRST)

Firuziyeh (Persian: فيروزيه) (Note: Also romanized as Fīrūzīyeh; also known as Kalāteh-ye Fīrūzīyeh) is a village in Daman Kuh Rural District of Zorqabad District in Esfarayen County, North Khorasan province, Iran.

== Demographics ==
=== Population ===
At the time of the 2006 National Census, the village's population was 138 in 34 households, when it was in the Central District. The following census in 2011 counted 133 people in 37 households. The 2016 census measured the population of the village as 158 people in 44 households.

In 2023, the rural district was separated from the district in the formation of Zorqabad District.
