= Rezqabad =

Rezqabad or Rezaqabad (Persian: رزق اباد) may refer to:

- Rezqabad, Kerman
- Rezqabad, North Khorasan
- Rezqabad, Razavi Khorasan
- Rezqabad Rural District, in North Khorasan Province
