= Kuran, North Khorasan =

Village in North Khorasan province, Iran

Kuran Persian: كوران
- Village
- Location within Iran
- Coordinates: 37°00′19″N 57°13′38″E
- Country: Iran
- Province: North Khorasan
- County: Esfarayen
- District: Zorqabad
- Rural District: Zorqabad

Population (2016)
  - Total: 56
- Time zone: UTC+3:30 (IRST)

Kuran (Persian: كوران) (Note: Also romanized as Kūrān) is a village in Zorqabad Rural District of Zorqabad District in Esfarayen County, North Khorasan province, Iran.

== Demographics ==
=== Population ===
At the time of the 2006 National Census, the village's population was 47 in 13 households, when it was in the Central District. The following census in 2011 counted 73 people in 22 households. The 2016 census measured the population of the village as 56 people in 23 households.

In 2023, the rural district was separated from the district in the formation of Zorqabad District.
