= Adkan =

Village in North Khorasan province, Iran

Adkan Persian: ادكان
- Village
- Location within Iran
- Coordinates: 37°01′36″N 57°16′44″E
- Country: Iran
- Province: North Khorasan
- County: Esfarayen
- District: Zorqabad
- Rural District: Zorqabad

Population (2016)
  - Total: 65
- Time zone: UTC+3:30 (IRST)

Adkan (Persian: ادكان) (Note: Also romanized as Adkān) is a village in Zorqabad Rural District of Zorqabad District in Esfarayen County, North Khorasan province, Iran.

== Demographics ==
=== Population ===
At the time of the 2006 National Census, the village's population was 123 in 39 households, when it was in the Central District. The following census in 2011 counted 90 people in 31 households. The 2016 census measured the population of the village as 65 people in 24 households.

In 2023, the rural district was separated from the district in the formation of Zorqabad District.
