= Ajqan =

Village in North Khorasan province, Iran

Ajqan Persian: اجقان
- Village
- Location within Iran
- Coordinates: 37°03′58″N 57°19′24″E
- Country: Iran
- Province: North Khorasan
- County: Esfarayen
- District: Zorqabad
- Rural District: Zorqabad

Population (2016)
  - Total: 279
- Time zone: UTC+3:30 (IRST)

Ajqan (Persian: اجقان) (Note: Also romanized as Ajqān; also known as Ajghān) is a village in, and the capital of, Zorqabad Rural District in Zorqabad District of Esfarayen County, North Khorasan province, Iran. The previous capital of the rural district was the village of Rezqabad. (Note: Also known as Zorqabad)

== Demographics ==
=== Population ===
At the time of the 2006 National Census, the village's population was 513 in 139 households, when it was in the Central District. The following census in 2011 counted 396 people in 127 households. The 2016 census measured the population of the village as 279 people in 101 households.

In 2023, the rural district was separated from the district in the formation of Zorqabad District.
