= Kheyrabad, Esfarayen =

Village in North Khorasan province, Iran

Kheyrabad Persian: خيراباد
- Village
- Location within Iran
- Coordinates: 37°01′44″N 57°22′43″E
- Country: Iran
- Province: North Khorasan
- County: Esfarayen
- District: Zorqabad
- Rural District: Zorqabad

Population (2016)
  - Total: 132
- Time zone: UTC+3:30 (IRST)

Kheyrabad (Persian: خيراباد) (Note: Also romanized as Kheyrābād) is a village in Zorqabad Rural District of Zorqabad District in Esfarayen County, North Khorasan province, Iran.

== Demographics ==
=== Population ===
At the time of the 2006 National Census, the village's population was 206 in 56 households, when it was in the Central District. The following census in 2011 counted 197 people in 62 households. The 2016 census measured the population of the village as 132 people in 50 households.

In 2023, the rural district was separated from the district in the formation of Zorqabad District.
