= Chahar Borj, North Khorasan =

Village in North Khorasan province, Iran

Chahar Borj Persian: چهار برج
- Village
- Location within Iran
- Coordinates: 37°07′12″N 57°11′29″E
- Country: Iran
- Province: North Khorasan
- County: Esfarayen
- District: Zorqabad
- Rural District: Daman Kuh

Population (2016)
  - Total: 1,999
- Time zone: UTC+3:30 (IRST)

Chahar Borj (Persian: چها ربرج) (Note: Also romanized as Chahār Borj and Chehār Borj) is a village in, and the capital of, Daman Kuh Rural District in Zorqabad District of Esfarayen County, North Khorasan province, Iran.

== Demographics ==
=== Population ===
At the time of the 2006 National Census, the village's population was 1,996 in 509 households, when it was in the Central District. The following census in 2011 counted 1,922 people in 546 households. The 2016 census measured the population of the village as 1,999 people in 641 households, the most populous in its rural district.

In 2023, the rural district was separated from the district in the formation of Zorqabad District.
