= Shur-e Bala =

Village in North Khorasan province, Iran

Shur-e Bala Persian: شوربالا
- Village
- Location within Iran
- Coordinates: 37°07′19″N 57°40′25″E
- Country: Iran
- Province: North Khorasan
- County: Esfarayen
- District: Central
- Rural District: Milanlu

Population (2016)
  - Total: 214
- Time zone: UTC+3:30 (IRST)

Shur-e Bala (Persian: شوربالا) (Note: Also romanized as Shūr-e Bālā; also known as Shūr) is a village in Milanlu Rural District of the Central District in Esfarayen County, North Khorasan province, Iran.

== Demographics ==
=== Population ===
At the time of the 2006 National Census, the village's population was 170 in 40 households. The following census in 2011 counted 121 people in 42 households. The 2016 census measured the population of the village as 214 people in 66 households.
