= Khushin =

Village in North Khorasan province, Iran

Khushin Persian: خوشين
- Village
- Country: Iran
- Province: North Khorasan
- County: Esfarayen
- District: Central
- Rural District: Ruin

Population (2016)
  - Total: 1,317
- Time zone: UTC+3:30 (IRST)

Khushin (Persian: خوشين) (Note: Also romanized as Khūshīn) is a village in Ruin Rural District of the Central District in Esfarayen County, North Khorasan province, Iran.

== Demographics ==
=== Population ===
At the time of the 2006 National Census, the village's population was 1,725 in 417 households. The following census in 2011 counted 1,450 people in 398 households. The 2016 census measured the population of the village as 1,317 people in 403 households.
