= Qazaqi =

Village in North Khorasan province, Iran

Qazaqi Persian: قزاقي
- Village
- Location within Iran
- Coordinates: 37°05′41″N 57°33′13″E
- Country: Iran
- Province: North Khorasan
- County: Esfarayen
- District: Central
- Rural District: Milanlu

Population (2016)
  - Total: 249
- Time zone: UTC+3:30 (IRST)

Qazaqi (Persian: قزاقي) (Note: Also romanized as Qazāqī; also known as Kazogī and Qazāghī) is a village in Milanlu Rural District of the Central District in Esfarayen County, North Khorasan province, Iran.

== Demographics ==
=== Population ===
At the time of the 2006 National Census, the village's population was 329 in 68 households. The following census in 2011 counted 306 people in 81 households. The 2016 census measured the population of the village as 249 people in 72 households.
