= Ruin, Iran =

Village in North Khorasan province, Iran

Ruin Persian: رويين
- Village
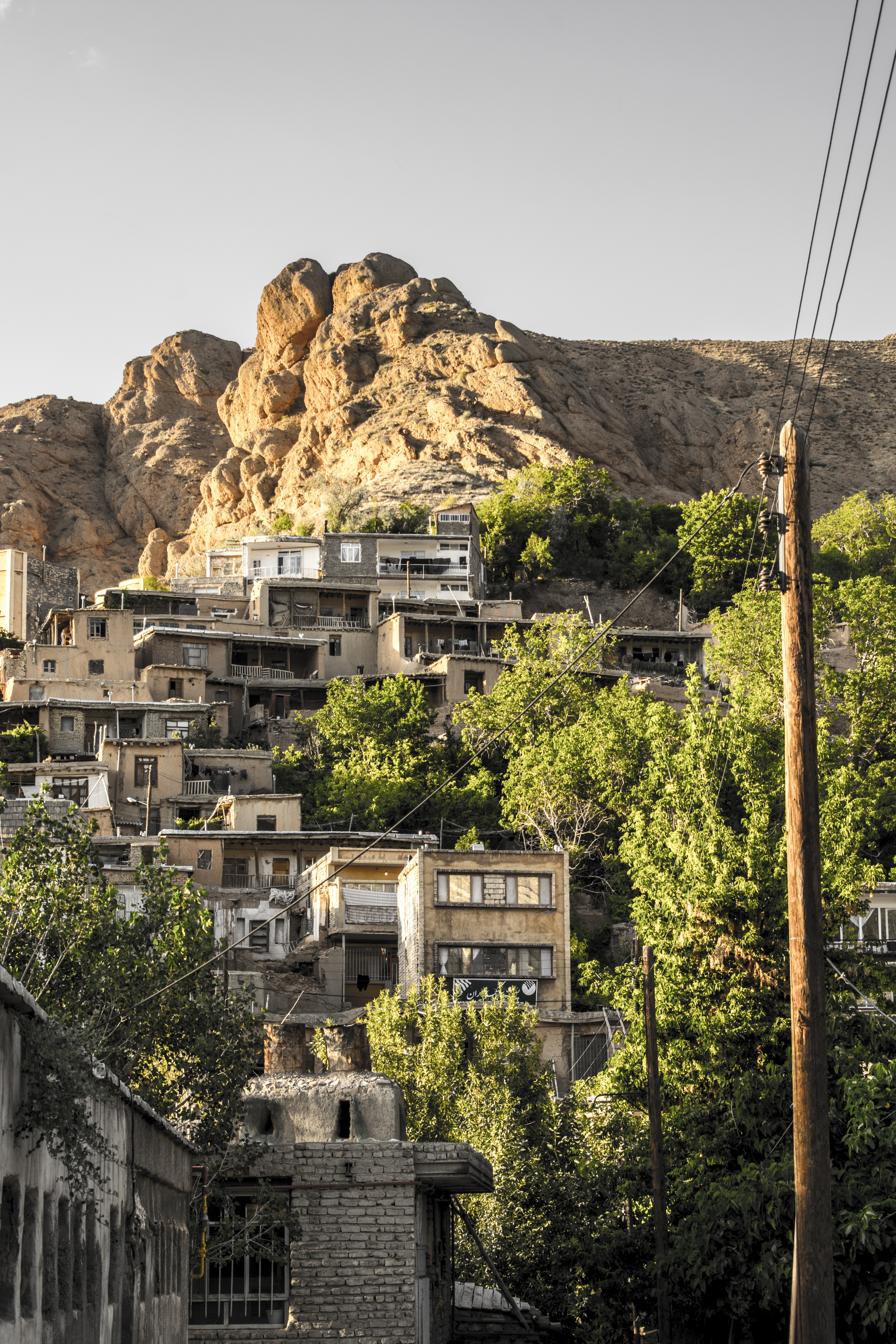
- The village of Ruin

- Location within Iran
- Coordinates: 37°12′15″N 57°29′12″E
- Country: Iran
- Province: North Khorasan
- County: Esfarayen
- District: Central
- Rural District: Ruin

Population (2016)
  - Total: 2,123
- Time zone: UTC+3:30 (IRST)

Ruin (Persian: رويين) (Note: Also romanized as Rū’īn) is a village in Ruin Rural District of the Central District in Esfarayen County, North Khorasan province, Iran.

== Demographics ==
=== Language ===
The dominant language in the village is Tati.

=== Population ===
At the time of the 2006 National Census, the village's population was 2,604 in 783 households. The following census in 2011 counted 2,337 people in 801 households. The 2016 census measured the population of the village as 2,123 people in 764 households.

== See also ==
Media related to Ruin, Iran at Wikimedia Commons
