= Sar Cheshmeh, Esfarayen =

Village in North Khorasan province, Iran

Sar Cheshmeh Persian: سرچشمه
- Village
- Location within Iran
- Coordinates: 37°07′58″N 57°45′52″E
- Country: Iran
- Province: North Khorasan
- County: Esfarayen
- District: Central
- Rural District: Milanlu

Population (2016)
  - Total: 250
- Time zone: UTC+3:30 (IRST)

Sar Cheshmeh (Persian: سرچشمه) (Note: Also romanized as Sar Chashmeh) is a village in Milanlu Rural District of the Central District in Esfarayen County, North Khorasan province, Iran.

== Demographics ==
=== Population ===
At the time of the 2006 National Census, the village's population was 355 in 80 households. The following census in 2011 counted 267 people in 73 households. The 2016 census measured the population of the village as 250 people in 81 households.
