= Kalateh-ye Pialeh =

Kalateh-ye Pialeh كلاته پياله
- Village
- Location within Iran
- Coordinates: 37°06′44″N 57°34′45″E
- Country: Iran
- Province: North Khorasan
- County: Esfarayen
- Bakhsh: Central
- Rural District: Milanlu

Population (2006)
  - Total: 209
- Time zone: UTC+3:30 (IRST)
  - Summer (DST): UTC+4:30 (IRDT)

Kalateh-ye Pialeh (Persian: كلاته پياله, also Romanized as Kalāteh-ye Pīāleh) is a village in Milanlu Rural District, in the Central District of Esfarayen County, North Khorasan Province, Iran. At the 2006 census, its population was 209, in 52 families.
