= Qaleh-ye Sefid, North Khorasan =

Village in North Khorasan province, Iran

Qaleh-ye Sefid Persian: قلعه سفيد
- Village
- Location within Iran
- Coordinates: 37°05′51″N 57°41′35″E
- Country: Iran
- Province: North Khorasan
- County: Esfarayen
- District: Central
- Rural District: Milanlu

Population (2016)
  - Total: 184
- Time zone: UTC+3:30 (IRST)

Qaleh-ye Sefid (Persian: قلعه سفيد) (Note: Also romanized as Qal‘eh-ye Sefīd) is a village in Milanlu Rural District of the Central District in Esfarayen County, North Khorasan province, Iran.

== Demographics ==
=== Population ===
At the time of the 2006 National Census, the village's population was 144 in 31 households. The following census in 2011 counted 154 people in 41 households. The 2016 census measured the population of the village as 184 people in 61 households.
