= Bidvaz =

Village in North Khorasan province, Iran

Bidvaz Persian: بيدواز
- Village
- Location within Iran
- Coordinates: 37°06′37″N 57°42′32″E
- Country: Iran
- Province: North Khorasan
- County: Esfarayen
- District: Central
- Rural District: Milanlu

Population (2016)
  - Total: 451
- Time zone: UTC+3:30 (IRST)

Bidvaz (Persian: بيدواز) (Note: Also romanized as Bīdvāz; also known as Bīdvā) is a village in Milanlu Rural District of the Central District in Esfarayen County, North Khorasan province, Iran.

== Demographics ==
=== Population ===
At the time of the 2006 National Census, the village's population was 229 in 64 households. The following census in 2011 counted 237 people in 66 households. The 2016 census measured the population of the village as 451 people in 134 households.
