= Jowshaqan, Esfarayen =

Village in North Khorasan province, Iran

Jowshaqan Persian: جوشقان
- Village
- Location within Iran
- Coordinates: 37°03′02″N 57°27′58″E
- Country: Iran
- Province: North Khorasan
- County: Esfarayen
- District: Central
- Rural District: Azari

Population (2016)
  - Total: 1,322
- Time zone: UTC+3:30 (IRST)

Jowshaqan (Persian: جوشقان) (Note: Also romanized as Jowshaqān and Jūshqān; also known as Isfarāīn) is a village in Azari Rural District of the Central District in Esfarayen County, North Khorasan province, Iran.

== Demographics ==
=== Population ===
At the time of the 2006 National Census, the village's population was 1,132 in 301 households. The following census in 2011 counted 1,073 people in 326 households. The 2016 census measured the population of the village as 1,322 people in 401 households.
