= Ordaghan =

Village in North Khorasan province, Iran

Ordaghan Persian: اردغان
- Village
- Location within Iran
- Coordinates: 37°07′13″N 57°44′23″E
- Country: Iran
- Province: North Khorasan
- County: Esfarayen
- District: Central
- Rural District: Milanlu

Population (2016)
  - Total: 767
- Time zone: UTC+3:30 (IRST)

Ordaghan (Persian: اردغان) (Note: Also romanized as Ardaghān and Ordaghān) is a village in Milanlu Rural District of the Central District in Esfarayen County, North Khorasan province, Iran.

== Demographics ==
=== Population ===
At the time of the 2006 National Census, the village's population was 637 in 142 households. The following census in 2011 counted 527 people in 143 households. The 2016 census measured the population of the village as 767 people in 220 households, the most populous in its rural district.
