= Tui =

Tui or TUI may refer to:

== Places ==
- Tui, Pontevedra, Spain
- Tui, Iran, West Azerbaijan Province, Iran
- Tui, North Khorasan, North Khorasan Province, Iran
- Tui Province, Burkina Faso
- Tui railway station, New Zealand

== Computing ==
- Tangible user interface, in which people interact with digital information through the physical environment
- Text-based user interface, as distinct from a graphical user interface
- Touch user interface, a computer-pointing technology

== Organisations ==
- TUI Group, a tour operator
  - TUIfly, several airlines owned by TUI Group
  - TUI Travel, a British leisure travel group that merged with TUI Group
  - TUI Airways, the charter airline company owned by TUI Group
- North Tui Sports, a 1930s New Zealand aircraft
- Teachers' Union of Ireland, a trade union
- Trident University International, an online university in the United States

== Other uses ==
- Tūī, a New Zealand native bird
- Tui (beer), a New Zealand beer, named after the bird
- Tui (name), a Polynesian given name and surname
- Tui (intellectual), coined by Bertolt Brecht from "Tellekt-Ual-In", for "intellectual"
- Tu'i, a title of nobility in Polynesia and Melanesia
- Tui Awards, New Zealand music awards
- Tui mine, New Zealand
- Tui Regio, a region on Saturn's moon Titan
- Turaif Domestic Airport (IATA code), Saudi Arabia
- HMNZS Tui, two former ships of the Royal New Zealand Navy
- Triple uptake inhibitor or serotonin–norepinephrine–dopamine reuptake inhibitor

== See also ==
- Tuy (disambiguation)
