= Anushirvan, Iran =

Anushirvan انوشيروان
- Village
- Location within Iran
- Coordinates: 37°04′34″N 57°36′39″E
- Country: Iran
- Province: North Khorasan
- County: Esfarayen
- Bakhsh: Central
- Rural District: Milanlu

Population (2006)
  - Total: 120
- Time zone: UTC+3:30 (IRST)
  - Summer (DST): UTC+4:30 (IRDT)

Anushirvan (Persian: انوشيروان, also Romanized as Anūshīrvān; also known as Nūshīrvān) is a village in Milanlu Rural District, in the Central District of Esfarayen County, North Khorasan Province, Iran. At the 2006 census, its population was 120, in 26 families.
