= Sarmaran =

Village in North Khorasan province, Iran

Sarmaran Persian: سارمران
- Village
- Location within Iran
- Coordinates: 37°07′42″N 57°17′08″E
- Country: Iran
- Province: North Khorasan
- County: Esfarayen
- District: Zorqabad
- Rural District: Daman Kuh

Population (2016)
  - Total: 1,051
- Time zone: UTC+3:30 (IRST)

Sarmaran (Persian: سارمران) (Note: Also romanized as Sār Merān, Sārmarān, and Sarmārān; also known as Chahār Mārān and Chārmārān) is a village in Daman Kuh Rural District of Zorqabad District in Esfarayen County, North Khorasan province, Iran.

== Demographics ==
=== Population ===
At the time of the 2006 National Census, the village's population was 1,417 in 315 households, when it was in the Central District. The following census in 2011 counted 1,310 people in 316 households. The 2016 census measured the population of the village as 1,051 people in 285 households.

In 2023, the rural district was separated from the district in the formation of Zorqabad District.
