= Hasanabad, Esfarayen =

Village in North Khorasan province, Iran

Hasanabad Persian: حسن اباد
- Village
- Location within Iran
- Coordinates: 37°06′48″N 57°42′26″E
- Country: Iran
- Province: North Khorasan
- County: Esfarayen
- District: Central
- Rural District: Milanlu

Population (2016)
  - Total: 582
- Time zone: UTC+3:30 (IRST)

Hasanabad (Persian: حسن اباد) (Note: Also romanized as Ḩasanābād) is a village in Milanlu Rural District of the Central District in Esfarayen County, North Khorasan province, Iran.

== Demographics ==
=== Population ===
At the time of the 2006 National Census, the village's population was 378 in 86 households. The following census in 2011 counted 322 people in 91 households. The 2016 census measured the population of the village as 582 people in 168 households.
