= Kalateh-ye Bozorg, North Khorasan =

Village in North Khorasan province, Iran

Kalateh-ye Bozorg Persian: كلاته بزرگ
- Village
- Location within Iran
- Coordinates: 37°01′15″N 57°11′40″E
- Country: Iran
- Province: North Khorasan
- County: Esfarayen
- District: Zorqabad
- Rural District: Zorqabad

Population (2016)
  - Total: 80
- Time zone: UTC+3:30 (IRST)

Kalateh-ye Bozorg (Persian: كلاته بزرگ) (Note: Also romanized as Kalāteh-ye Bozorg) is a village in Zorqabad Rural District of Zorqabad District in Esfarayen County, North Khorasan province, Iran.

== Demographics ==
=== Population ===
At the time of the 2006 National Census, the village's population was 146 in 37 households, when it was in the Central District. The following census in 2011 counted 130 people in 43 households. The 2016 census measured the population of the village as 80 people in 26 households.

In 2023, the rural district was separated from the district in the formation of Zorqabad District.
