= Chahar Muran =

Chahar Muran (Persian: چهارموران) may refer to:

- Chahar Muran, Chaharmahal and Bakhtiari
- Chahar Muran, Khuzestan

== See also ==
- Chahar Maran (disambiguation)
