= Abbasabad, Esfarayen =

Village in North Khorasan province, Iran

Abbasabad Persian: عباس‌آباد
- Village
- Location within Iran
- Coordinates: 36°58′48″N 57°31′47″E
- Country: Iran
- Province: North Khorasan
- County: Esfarayen
- District: Central
- Rural District: Azari

Population (2016)
  - Total: 589
- Time zone: UTC+3:30 (IRST)

Abbasabad (Persian: عباس‌آباد) (Note: Also romanized as ‘Abbāsābād) is a village in, and the capital of, Azari Rural District in the Central District of Esfarayen County, North Khorasan province, Iran.

== Demographics ==
=== Population ===
At the time of the 2006 National Census, the village's population was 479 in 108 households. The following census in 2011 counted 550 people in 147 households. The 2016 census measured the population of the village as 589 people in 159 households.
