= Hesar-e Kazimabad =

Hesar-e Kazimabad حصاركاظم اباد
- Village
- Country: Iran
- Province: North Khorasan
- County: Esfarayen
- Bakhsh: Central
- Rural District: Milanlu

Population (2006)
  - Total: 28
- Time zone: UTC+3:30 (IRST)
  - Summer (DST): UTC+4:30 (IRDT)

Hesar-e Kazimabad (Persian: حصاركاظم اباد, also Romanized as Ḩeşār-e Kāẓimābād) is a village in Milanlu Rural District, in the Central District of Esfarayen County, North Khorasan Province, Iran. At the 2006 census, its population was 28, in 7 families.
