= Karimabad-e Olya, North Khorasan =

Karimabad-e Olya كريم ابادعليا
- Village
- Country: Iran
- Province: North Khorasan
- County: Esfarayen
- Bakhsh: Central
- Rural District: Milanlu

Population (2006)
  - Total: 154
- Time zone: UTC+3:30 (IRST)
  - Summer (DST): UTC+4:30 (IRDT)

Karimabad-e Olya (Persian: كريم ابادعليا, also Romanized as Karīmābād-e ‘Olyā) is a village in Milanlu Rural District, in the Central District of Esfarayen County, North Khorasan Province, Iran. At the 2006 census, its population was 154, in 35 families.
