= Kalateh-ye Shur, Esfarayen =

Village in North Khorasan province, Iran

Kalateh-ye Shur Persian: كلاته شور
- Village
- Location within Iran
- Coordinates: 37°02′37″N 57°11′58″E
- Country: Iran
- Province: North Khorasan
- County: Esfarayen
- District: Zorqabad
- Rural District: Zorqabad

Population (2016)
  - Total: 119
- Time zone: UTC+3:30 (IRST)

Kalateh-ye Shur (Persian: كلاته شور) (Note: Also romanized as Kalāteh-ye Shūr) is a village in Zorqabad Rural District of Zorqabad District in Esfarayen County, North Khorasan province, Iran.

== Demographics ==
=== Population ===
At the time of the 2006 National Census, the village's population was 189 in 48 households, when it was in the Central District. The following census in 2011 counted 184 people in 48 households. The 2016 census measured the population of the village as 119 people in 38 households.

In 2023, the rural district was separated from the district in the formation of Zorqabad District.
