= Jan Ahmadi =

Jan Ahmadi جان احمدي
- Village
- Location within Iran
- Coordinates: 37°04′43″N 57°35′44″E
- Country: Iran
- Province: North Khorasan
- County: Esfarayen
- Bakhsh: Central
- Rural District: Milanlu

Population (2006)
  - Total: 61
- Time zone: UTC+3:30 (IRST)
  - Summer (DST): UTC+4:30 (IRDT)

Jan Ahmadi (Persian: جان احمدي, also Romanized as Jān Aḩmadī; also known as Kalāteh-ye Ḩājjī Qanbar) is a village in Milanlu Rural District, in the Central District of Esfarayen County, North Khorasan Province, Iran. At the 2006 census, its population was 61, in 11 families.
