= Mahmudi, North Khorasan =

Village in North Khorasan province, Iran

Mahmudi Persian: محمودي
- Village
- Location within Iran
- Coordinates: 37°11′38″N 57°26′44″E
- Country: Iran
- Province: North Khorasan
- County: Esfarayen
- District: Central
- Rural District: Ruin

Population (2016)
  - Total: 922
- Time zone: UTC+3:30 (IRST)

Mahmudi (Persian: محمودي) (Note: Also romanized as Maḩmūdī) is a village in Ruin Rural District of the Central District in Esfarayen County, North Khorasan province, Iran.

== Demographics ==
=== Population ===
At the time of the 2006 National Census, the village's population was 912 in 234 households. The following census in 2011 counted 986 people in 283 households. The 2016 census measured the population of the village as 922 people in 292 households.
