= Fariman, North Khorasan =

Village in North Khorasan province, Iran

Fariman Persian: فريمان
- Village
- Location within Iran
- Coordinates: 37°06′48″N 57°25′02″E
- Country: Iran
- Province: North Khorasan
- County: Esfarayen
- District: Central
- Rural District: Ruin

Population (2016)
  - Total: 740
- Time zone: UTC+3:30 (IRST)

Fariman (Persian: فريمان) (Note: Also romanized as Farīmān) is a village in Ruin Rural District of the Central District in Esfarayen County, North Khorasan province, Iran.

== Demographics ==
=== Population ===
At the time of the 2006 National Census, the village's population was 853 in 187 households. The following census in 2011 counted 831 people in 223 households. The 2016 census measured the population of the village as 740 people in 205 households.
