= Chehel Dokhtaran, North Khorasan =

Village in North Khorasan province, Iran

Chehel Dokhtaran Persian: چهل دختران
- Village
- Location within Iran
- Coordinates: 36°57′49″N 57°02′56″E
- Country: Iran
- Province: North Khorasan
- County: Esfarayen
- District: Zorqabad
- Rural District: Zorqabad

Population (2016)
  - Total: 101
- Time zone: UTC+3:30 (IRST)

Chehel Dokhtaran (Persian: چهل دختران) (Note: Also romanized as Chehel Dokhtarān) is a village in Zorqabad Rural District of Zorqabad District in Esfarayen County, North Khorasan province, Iran.

== Demographics ==
=== Population ===
At the time of the 2006 National Census, the village's population was 202 in 43 households, when it was in the Central District. The following census in 2011 counted 179 people in 49 households. The 2016 census measured the population of the village as 101 people in 35 households.

In 2023, the rural district was separated from the district in the formation of Zorqabad District.
