= Fartan =

Fartan (Persian: فرطان) may refer to:

- Fartan-e Kohneh
- Fartan-e Tazeh
