= Dar Parchin =

Dar Parchin or Darparchin (Persian: درپرچين) may refer to:

- Dar Parchin-e Olya
- Dar Parchin-e Sofla
