= Parkanlu =

Village in North Khorasan province, Iran

Parkanlu Persian: پركانلو
- Village
- Location within Iran
- Coordinates: 37°04′26″N 57°35′59″E
- Country: Iran
- Province: North Khorasan
- County: Esfarayen
- District: Central
- Rural District: Milanlu

Population (2016)
  - Total: 82
- Time zone: UTC+3:30 (IRST)

Parkanlu (Persian: پركانلو) (Note: Also romanized as Parkānlū) is a village in, and the capital of, Milanlu Rural District in the Central District of Esfarayen County, North Khorasan province, Iran.

== Demographics ==
=== Population ===
At the time of the 2006 National Census, the village's population was 165 in 33 households. The following census in 2011 counted 118 people in 37 households. The 2016 census measured the population of the village as 82 people in 23 households.
