= Chahar Maran =

Chahar Maran (Persian: چهارماران) may refer to:

- Chahar Maran, Chaharmahal and Bakhtiari
- Chahar Maran, North Khorasan

== See also ==
- Chahar Muran (disambiguation)
