= Iraj, North Khorasan =

Village in North Khorasan province, Iran

Iraj Persian: ايرج
- Village
- Location within Iran
- Coordinates: 37°07′25″N 57°24′23″E
- Country: Iran
- Province: North Khorasan
- County: Esfarayen
- District: Central
- Rural District: Ruin

Population (2016)
  - Total: 1,421
- Time zone: UTC+3:30 (IRST)

Iraj (Persian: ايرج) (Note: Also romanized as Īraj) is a village in, and the capital of, Ruin Rural District in the Central District of Esfarayen County, North Khorasan province, Iran.

== Demographics ==
=== Population ===
At the time of the 2006 National Census, the village's population was 1,506 in 366 households. The following census in 2011 counted 1,594 people in 424 households. The 2016 census measured the population of the village as 1,421 people in 431 households.
