= Kalat, North Khorasan =

Village in North Khorasan province, Iran

Kalat Persian: كلات
- Village
- Location within Iran
- Coordinates: 37°13′09″N 57°24′34″E
- Country: Iran
- Province: North Khorasan
- County: Esfarayen
- District: Central
- Rural District: Ruin

Population (2016)
  - Total: 1,148
- Time zone: UTC+3:30 (IRST)

Kalat (Persian: كلات) (Note: Also romanized as Kalāt) is a village in Ruin Rural District of the Central District in Esfarayen County, North Khorasan province, Iran.

== Demographics ==
=== Population ===
At the time of the 2006 National Census, the village's population was 1,372 in 351 households. The following census in 2011 counted 1,328 people in 396 households. The 2016 census measured the population of the village as 1,148 people in 366 households.
