= Qasemabad, North Khorasan =

Village in North Khorasan province, Iran

Qasemabad Persian: قاسم اباد
- Village
- Location within Iran
- Coordinates: 36°59′09″N 57°33′13″E
- Country: Iran
- Province: North Khorasan
- County: Esfarayen
- District: Central
- Rural District: Azari

Population (2016)
  - Total: 661
- Time zone: UTC+3:30 (IRST)

Qasemabad (Persian: قاسم اباد) (Note: Also romanized as Qāsemābād; also known as Qāsimābād) is a village in Azari Rural District of the Central District in Esfarayen County, North Khorasan province, Iran.

== Demographics ==
=== Population ===
At the time of the 2006 National Census, the village's population was 767 in 200 households. The following census in 2011 counted 735 people in 209 households. The 2016 census measured the population of the village as 661 people in 193 households.
