= Chehel Dokhtaran =

Chehel Dokhtaran or Cheheldokhtaran (Persian: چهل دختران) may refer to:

- Chehel Dokhtaran, Kohgiluyeh and Boyer-Ahmad
- Chehel Dokhtaran, North Khorasan
