= Atimoz =

Village in North Khorasan province, Iran

Atimoz Persian: اتيمز
- Village
- Location within Iran
- Coordinates: 37°00′50″N 57°29′51″E
- Country: Iran
- Province: North Khorasan
- County: Esfarayen
- District: Central
- Rural District: Azari

Population (2016)
  - Total: 1,408
- Time zone: UTC+3:30 (IRST)

Atimoz (Persian: اتيمز) (Note: Also romanized as Atīmaz, Atīmoz, and Atyemaz; also known as Tīmaz) is a village in Azari Rural District of the Central District in Esfarayen County, North Khorasan province, Iran.

== Demographics ==
=== Population ===
At the time of the 2006 National Census, the village's population was 1,165 in 264 households. The following census in 2011 counted 1,409 people in 361 households. The 2016 census measured the population of the village as 1,408 people in 373 households.
