= Barastu =

Barastu برستو
- Village
- Location within Iran
- Coordinates: 37°06′32″N 57°39′44″E
- Country: Iran
- Province: North Khorasan
- County: Esfarayen
- Bakhsh: Central
- Rural District: Milanlu

Population (2006)
  - Total: 89
- Time zone: UTC+3:30 (IRST)
  - Summer (DST): UTC+4:30 (IRDT)

Barastu (Persian: برستو, also Romanized as Barastū; also known as Parastū) is a village in Milanlu Rural District, in the Central District of Esfarayen County, North Khorasan Province, Iran. At the 2006 census, its population was 89, including 16 families.
