= Kalateh-ye Reza, North Khorasan =

Village in North Khorasan province, Iran

Kalateh-ye Reza Persian: كلاته رضا
- Village
- Location within Iran
- Coordinates: 37°01′16″N 57°11′44″E
- Country: Iran
- Province: North Khorasan
- County: Esfarayen
- District: Zorqabad
- Rural District: Zorqabad

Population (2016)
  - Total: 99
- Time zone: UTC+3:30 (IRST)

Kalateh-ye Reza (Persian: كلاته رضا) (Note: Also romanized as Kalāteh-ye Reẕā; also known as Kalāteh, Kalāteh-ye Bachchehhā (كلاته بچه ها), and Kalāteh-ye Karbalā’ī-ye Ḩoseynī) is a village in Zorqabad Rural District of Zorqabad District in Esfarayen County, North Khorasan province, Iran.

== Demographics ==
=== Population ===
At the time of the 2006 National Census, the village's population was 147 in 38 households, when it was in the Central District. The following census in 2011 counted 129 people in 43 households. The 2016 census measured the population of the village as 99 people in 37 households.

In 2023, the rural district was separated from the district in the formation of Zorqabad District.
