= Garati =

Village in North Khorasan province, Iran

Garati Persian: گراتي
- Village
- Location within Iran
- Coordinates: 36°52′22″N 57°31′27″E
- Country: Iran
- Province: North Khorasan
- County: Esfarayen
- District: Central
- Rural District: Azari

Population (2016)
  - Total: 661
- Time zone: UTC+3:30 (IRST)

Garati (Persian: گراتي) (Note: Also romanized as Garātī) is a village in Azari Rural District of the Central District in Esfarayen County, North Khorasan province, Iran.

== Demographics ==
=== Population ===
At the time of the 2006 National Census, the village's population was 798 in 205 households. The following census in 2011 counted 732 people in 232 households. The 2016 census measured the population of the village as 661 people in 218 households.
