= Kushki, North Khorasan =

Village in North Khorasan province, Iran

Kushki Persian: كوشكي
- Village
- Location within Iran
- Coordinates: 37°03′25″N 57°27′54″E
- Country: Iran
- Province: North Khorasan
- County: Esfarayen
- District: Central
- Rural District: Azari

Population (2016)
  - Total: 1,300
- Time zone: UTC+3:30 (IRST)

Kushki (Persian: كوشكي) (Note: Also romanized as Kūshkī; also known as Kūnskī) is a village in Azari Rural District of the Central District in Esfarayen County, North Khorasan province, Iran.

== Demographics ==
=== Population ===
At the time of the 2006 National Census, the village's population was 1,079 in 282 households. The following census in 2011 counted 1,439 people in 418 households. The 2016 census measured the population of the village as 1,300 people in 399 households.
