= Qasem Khan Castle =

Castle in North Khorasan Province, Iran

Qasem Khan castle
- قلعه قاسم خان

General information
- Type: Castle
- Location: Esfarayen County, Iran

Qasem Khan castle (Persian: قلعه قاسم خان) is a historical castle located in Esfarayen County in North Khorasan Province, The longevity of this fortress dates back to the Middle Ages and Late Historical Periods of Islam.
