= SAST (disambiguation) =

SAST may refer to:

- Shanghai Academy of Spaceflight Technology, a Chinese space agency
- Static application security testing, a method of software testing
- South Africa Standard Time, the time zone used by South Africa, Eswatini, and Lesotho.
- Saudi Arabian Standard Time, the time zone used by Saudi Arabia, also known as Arabian Standard Time
- Sast, a village in North Khorasan province, Iran
