= Sangar Castle =

Castle in North Khorasan Province, Iran

- قلعه سنگر

General information
- Type: Castle
- Location: Esfarayen County, Iran

Sangar Castle (Persian: قلعه سنگر) is a historical castle located in Esfarayen County in North Khorasan Province, The longevity of this fortress dates back to the Parthian Empire and Sasanian Empire.
