= Sast, Afghanistan =

Village in Wakhan, Afghanistan

Coordinates: 36°59′N 72°46′E

Sast is a small village in the Wakhan Corridor of Afghanistan. It should not be confused with Sast, the village of the same name in Iran, or Sust, in Gilgit-Baltistan, Pakistan. Sast is located in Badakshan Province, as is the Corridor.

== See also ==
- Badakhshan Province
