= Rezqabad, North Khorasan =

Village in North Khorasan province, Iran

Rezqabad Persian: رزق اباد
- Village
- Location within Iran
- Coordinates: 37°03′18″N 57°17′23″E
- Country: Iran
- Province: North Khorasan
- County: Esfarayen
- District: Zorqabad
- Rural District: Zorqabad

Population (2016)
  - Total: 664
- Time zone: UTC+3:30 (IRST)

Rezqabad (Persian: رزق اباد) (Note: Also romanized as Rezqābād; also known as Zarq Ābād and Zorqābād) is a village in, and the former capital of, Zorqabad Rural District in Zorqabad District of Esfarayen County, North Khorasan province, Iran, serving as capital of the district. The capital of the rural district has been transferred to the village of Ajqan.

== Demographics ==
=== Population ===
At the time of the 2006 National Census, the village's population was 1,013 in 254 households, when it was in the Central District. The following census in 2011 counted 1,002 people in 262 households. The 2016 census measured the population of the village as 664 people in 225 households.

In 2023, the rural district was separated from the district in the formation of Zorqabad District.
