= Dar Parchin-e Olya =

Dar Parchin-e Olya درپرچين عليا
- Village
- Location within Iran
- Coordinates: 37°09′00″N 57°51′00″E
- Country: Iran
- Province: North Khorasan
- County: Esfarayen
- Bakhsh: Central
- Rural District: Milanlu

Population (2006)
  - Total: 29
- Time zone: UTC+3:30 (IRST)
  - Summer (DST): UTC+4:30 (IRDT)

Dar Parchin-e Olya (Persian: درپرچين عليا, also Romanized as Dar Parchīn-e 'Olyā; also known as Darparchīn-e Bālā) is a village in Milanlu Rural District, in the Central District of Esfarayen County, North Khorasan province, Iran. At the 2006 census, its population was 29, in 8 families.
