= Tuy =

Tuy or TUY may refer to:

== Places ==
=== Burkina Faso ===
- Tuy Province, in The Hauts-Bassins Region

=== Iran ===
- Tuy, Iran, a village in North Khorasan Province

=== Philippines ===
- Tuy, Batangas, a municipality in the Province of Batangas

=== Spain ===
- Tui, Pontevedra, a municipality in Galicia, spelled "Tuy" in Spanish

=== Venezuela ===
- Ocumare del Tuy, a city in the state of Miranda
- Santa Teresa del Tuy, a city in the state of Miranda
- Tuy River

=== Vietnam ===
- Tuy Đức District, Đắk Nông Province
- Tuy An District, Phú Yên Province
- Tuy Hòa, the capital city of Phú Yên Province
  - Tuy Hoa Air Base, used by the United States Air Force during the Vietnam War
  - Tuy Hòa Railway Station, a railway station on the North–South Railway
- Tuy Phong District, Bình Thuận Province
- Tuy Phước District, Bình Định Province

== People ==
- Hoàng Tụy (born 1927), Vietnamese mathematician
- Lucas de Tuy (died 1249), Leonese cleric and historian
- Lina Tuy (born 2004), French rugby union and sevens player.

== Broadcasting ==
- TV-U Yamagata, a television station in Yamagata Prefecture, Japan

== Transport ==
- Línea Turística Aereotuy, ICAO code TUY

== See also ==
- Tui (disambiguation)
