= Bidvaz Castle =

Castle in North Khorasan Province, Iran

- قلعه بیدواز
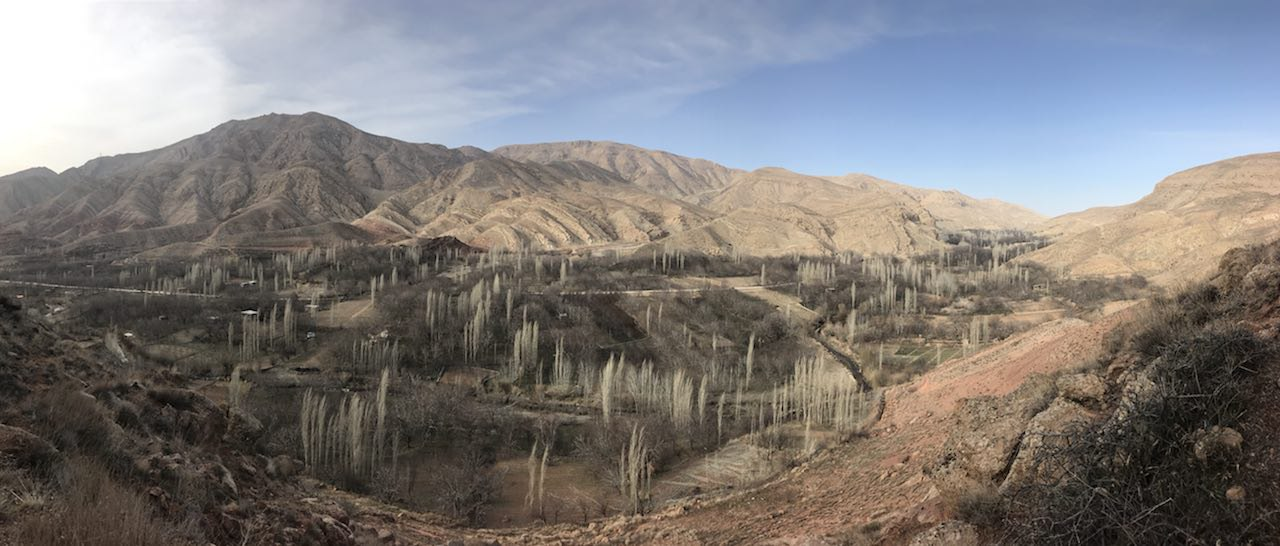

General information
- Type: Castle
- Location: Esfarayen County, Iran

Bidvaz Castle (Persian: قلعه بیدواز) is a historical castle located in Esfarayen County in North Khorasan Province, The longevity of this fortress dates back to the Parthian Empire.
