= Fartan-e Kohneh =

Village in North Khorasan province, Iran

Fartan-e Kohneh Persian: فرطان كهنه
- Village
- Location within Iran
- Coordinates: 37°03′15″N 57°32′08″E
- Country: Iran
- Province: North Khorasan
- County: Esfarayen
- District: Central
- Rural District: Azari

Population (2016)
  - Total: 2,351
- Time zone: UTC+3:30 (IRST)

Fartan-e Kohneh (Persian: فرطان كهنه) (Note: Also romanized as Farţān-e Kohneh) is a village in Azari Rural District of the Central District in Esfarayen County, North Khorasan province, Iran.

== Demographics ==
=== Population ===
At the time of the 2006 National Census, the village's population was 1,749 in 403 households. The following census in 2011 counted 2,197 people in 603 households. The 2016 census measured the population of the village as 2,351 people in 684 households, the most populous in its rural district.
