= Kalateh-ye Habib =

Kalateh-ye Habib (Persian: كلاته حبيب) may refer to:

- Kalateh-ye Habib, North Khorasan
- Kalateh-ye Habib, South Khorasan
