= Gurkanan Castle =

Castle in North Khorasan Province, Iran

Gurkanan castle
- قلعه گورکنن

General information
- Type: Castle
- Location: Esfarayen County, Iran

Gurkanan castle (Persian: قلعه گورکنن) is a historical castle located in Esfarayen County in North Khorasan Province, The longevity of this fortress dates back to the Early and middle centuries of post-Islamic historical periods.
