= Tuy, Iran =

Village in North Khorasan province, Iran

Tuy Persian: توي
- Village
- Location within Iran
- Coordinates: 37°07′58″N 57°06′24″E
- Country: Iran
- Province: North Khorasan
- County: Esfarayen
- District: Zorqabad
- Rural District: Daman Kuh

Population (2016)
  - Total: 1,529
- Time zone: UTC+3:30 (IRST)

Tuy (Persian: توي) (Note: Also romanized as Tavi, Tūi, and Tūy; also known as Toy) is a village in Daman Kuh Rural District of Zorqabad District in Esfarayen County, North Khorasan province, Iran.

== Demographics ==
=== Population ===
At the time of the 2006 National Census, the village's population was 1,327 in 297 households, when it was in the Central District. The following census in 2011 counted 1,528 people in 416 households. The 2016 census measured the population of the village as 1,529 people in 452 households.

In 2023, the rural district was separated from the district in the formation of Zorqabad District.
