= Sport in Kurdistan =

Types and sports in Kurdish regions

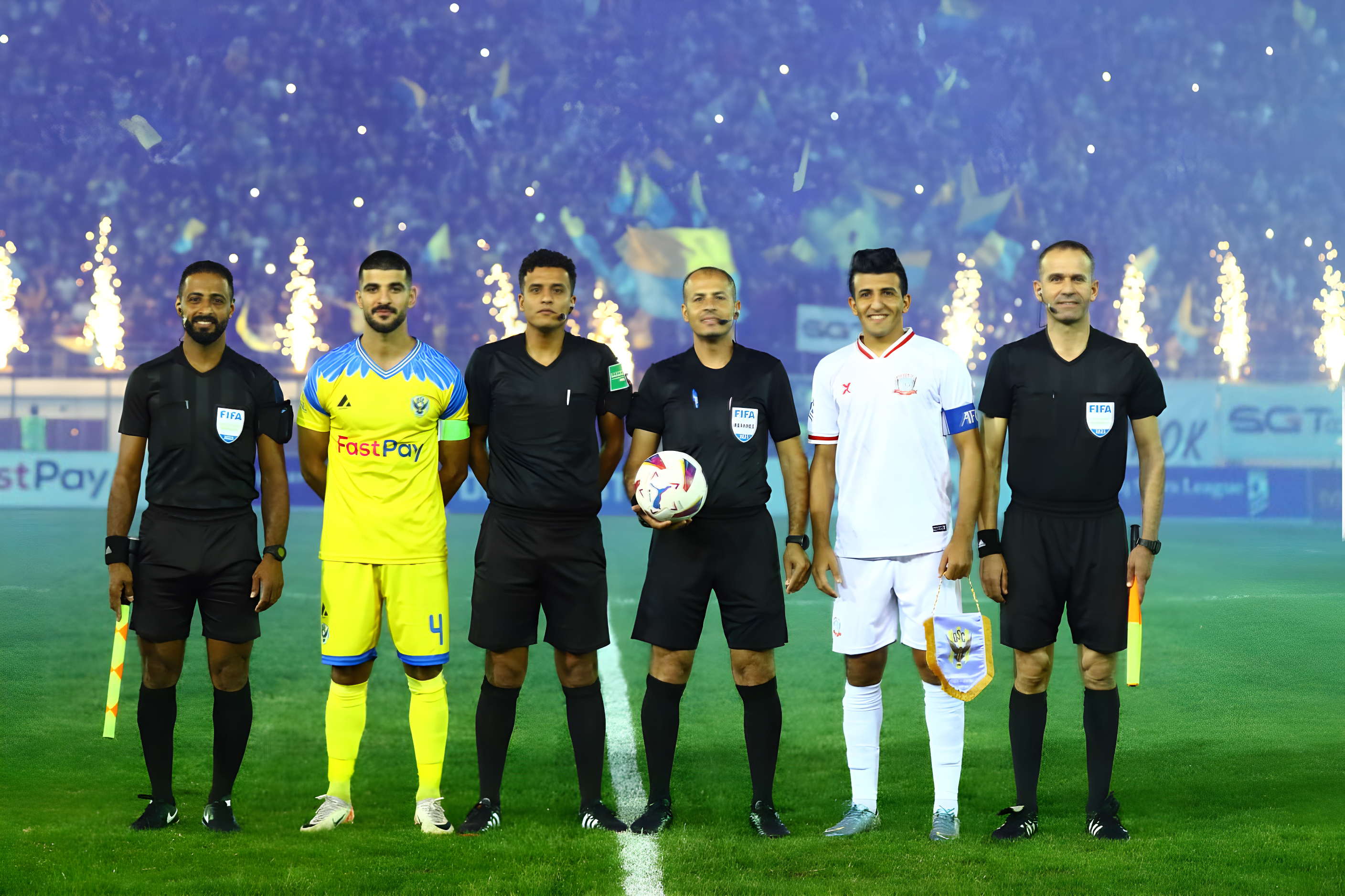
Bahdinan derby, Duhok SC vs Zakho SC, 4 November 2023 Dohuk Stadium.

Sport in Kurdistan (Kurdish: وەرزشی کوردستان, romanized: Werzişî Kurdistan) refers to the athletic activities and sporting culture across the various regions traditionally inhabited by Kurds, including areas in modern-day Iraq, (Southern Kurdistan) Turkey, (Northern Kurdistan) Iran, (Eastern Kurdistan) and Syria (Western Kurdistan). Among all sports, association football is the most popular and widely followed. It serves not only as a recreational activity but also as a means of fostering communal identity and solidarity across divided Kurdish regions, especially in the aftermath of decades of unrest.

The Kurdistan Region in northern Iraq is the only Kurdish-governed area with internationally recognized autonomous status. Administered by the Kurdistan Regional Government (KRG), it has developed its own sports institutions, including regional federations, clubs, and training facilities. The KRG also oversees domestic competitions and youth development programs. Due to its non-sovereign status, the region is not a member of major international sports organizations such as FIFA or the AFC. However, teams from the region have participated in international events through non-affiliated associations such as the Confederation of Independent Football Associations (ConIFA).

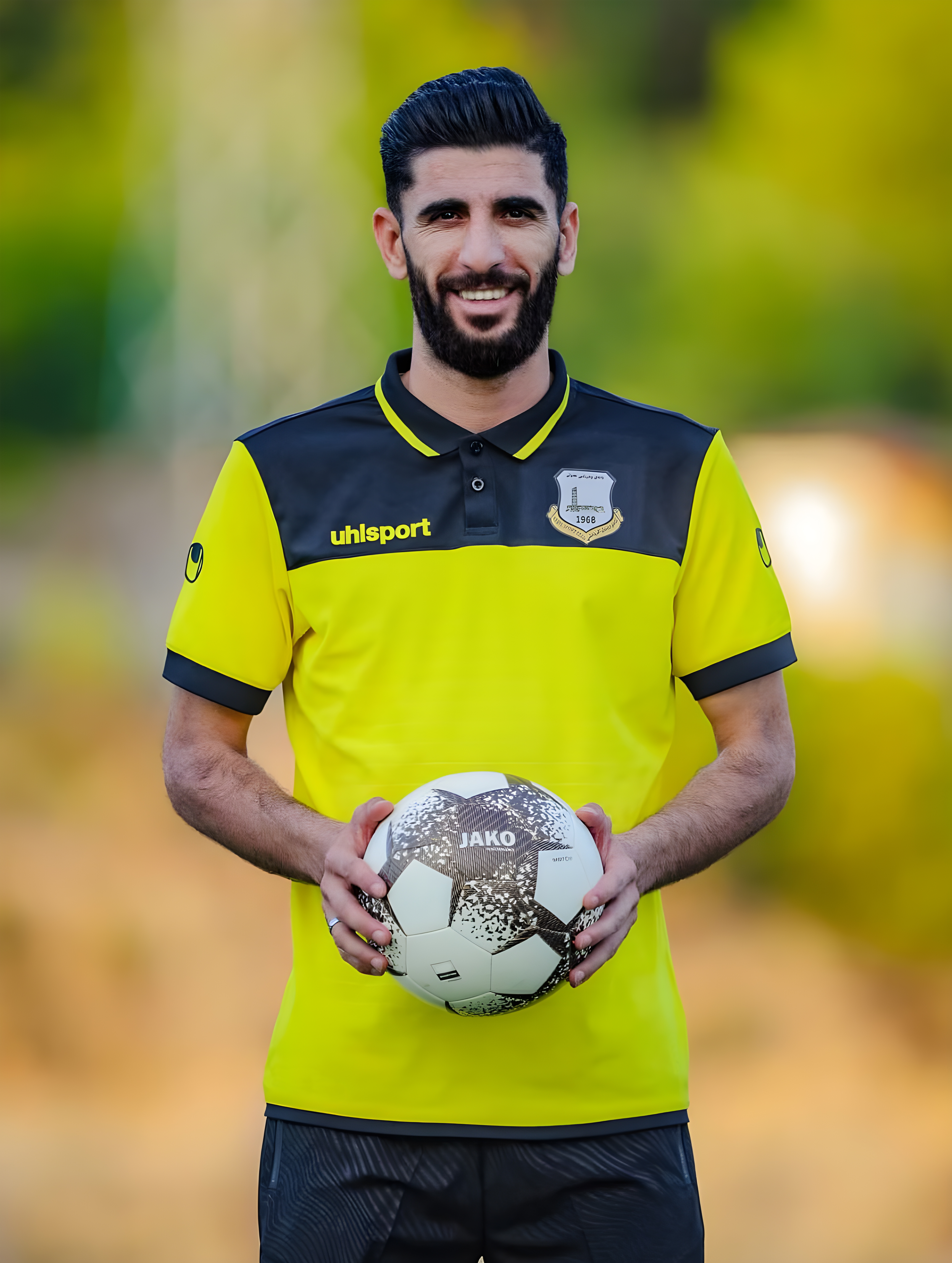
Aso Rostam, Kurdish footballer, 2023

In addition to football, several other sports are practiced in Kurdish communities, including wrestling, hunting, Killawen, and a traditional horseback javelin game known as cirit. Polo, referred to as chogan in Persian and gog in Kurdish, has historical roots in Central Asia and has also been practiced in some Kurdish communities, reflecting the region's diverse sporting traditions. The traditional Kurdish sport of Jorabin has been preserved and studied as part of the region's cultural heritage.

== Traditional sports ==
Traditional sports in the Kurdistan contribute to community engagement and the preservation of cultural heritage. Events such as women's sports festivals in the Erbil Governorate aim to encourage participation in traditional games.

Various culturally significant games continue to be practiced in Kurdish regions, especially in rural areas during festivals and communal gatherings. Activities such as cirit, and forms of wrestling remain popular in some areas. Polo, known as gog in Kurdish, has also been historically played. The traditional game of Jorabin has been studied as part of Kurdish heritage, though it is less commonly practiced today.

Choukhe wrestling is another traditional Kurdish sport in North Khorasan, Iran, held during festivals like Newroz. Wrestlers wear vests (choukhe) and aim to throw their opponent to the ground.

== Women's participation ==
The United Nations Entity for Gender Equality and the Empowerment of Women (UN Women) has introduced the Kurdistan Regional Action Plan for UNSCR 1325, which includes localized strategies to improve women's participation in various fields, including sports. Public awareness campaigns emphasizing the benefits of physical activity and the importance of family encouragement play a critical role in addressing social barriers that limit women's participation in sport. As a result, there is increasing recognition of the cultural value of traditional games and the importance of including women in efforts to preserve and participate in these heritage practices.

Nevertheless, traditional views rooted in family structures and religious norms continue to pose challenges to women's involvement in sports. Although societal acceptance remains limited, there has been a gradual rise in female participation in sports such as football and boxing, indicating a shift in public engagement and interest.

== See also ==
- Women in sport
