= Kalateh-ye Bozorg =

Kalateh-ye Bozorg (Persian: كلاته بزرگ) may refer to:

- Kalateh-ye Bozorg, North Khorasan
- Kalateh-ye Bozorg, Razavi Khorasan
