= Kalateh-ye Shur =

Kalateh-ye Shur (Persian: كلاته شور) may refer to:

- Kalateh-ye Shur, Esfarayen, North Khorasan Province
- Kalateh-ye Shur, Jajrom, North Khorasan Province
- Kalateh-ye Shur, Khoshab, Razavi Khorasan Province
