= Qelich Castle =

Castle in North Khorasan Province, Iran

Qelich castle
- قلعه قلیچ

General information
- Type: Castle
- Location: Esfarayen County, Iran

Qelich castle (Persian: قلعه قلیچ) is a historical castle located in Esfarayen County in North Khorasan Province. The fortress dates back to the Achaemenid Empire and Parthian Empire.
