= Dar Parchin-e Sofla =

Dar Parchin-e Sofla درپرچين سفلي
- Village
- Location within Iran
- Coordinates: 37°08′25″N 57°49′58″E
- Country: Iran
- Province: North Khorasan
- County: Esfarayen
- Bakhsh: Central
- Rural District: Milanlu

Population (2006)
  - Total: 132
- Time zone: UTC+3:30 (IRST)
  - Summer (DST): UTC+4:30 (IRDT)

Dar Parchin-e Sofla (Persian: درپرچين سفلي, also Romanized as Dar Parchīn-e Soflá; also known as Dar Parchīn-e Pā’īn, Dar Parchīn, and Dar Parchīn Pā’īn) is a village in Milanlu Rural District, in the Central District of Esfarayen County, North Khorasan province, Iran. At the 2006 census, its population was 132, in 27 families.
