= Zeinal-Khan Wrestling Arena =

Sports venue in Esfarayen, Iran

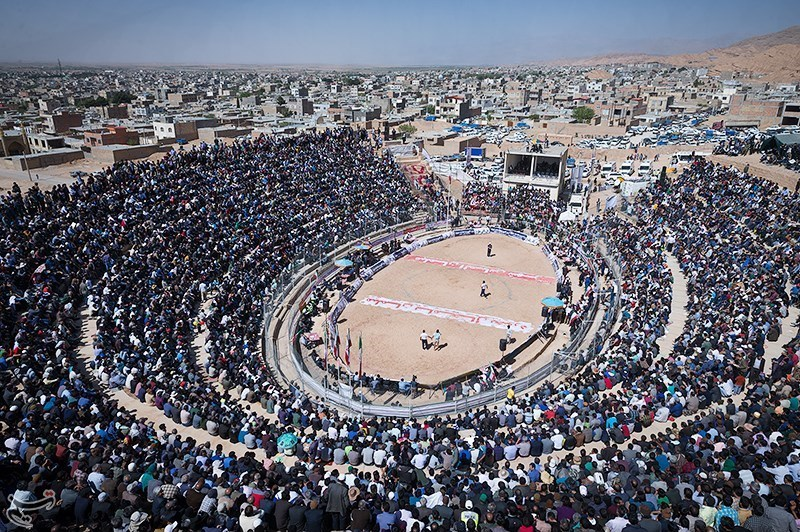
- Interactive map of Zeinal-Khan Wrestling Arena
- Full name: Zeinal-Khan Spring Wrestling Arena
- Location: Esfarayen, Iran
- Coordinates: 37.07253°N 57.52589°E
- Owner: Ministry of Sport and Youth (Iran)
- Capacity: 20,000
- Surface: Soil

Zeinal-Khan Wrestling Arena is a natural stadium for With-chukhe wrestling in Esfarayen, Iran.

Next to the Zeinal Khan spring in Esfarayen, there was a pit with four hills around it, and this caused a natural stadium to be seen from that area, which was named Zeinal-Khan Wrestling Arena. At first, there was no spectator stand in this stadium, but later, due to the welcome and interest of the people in wrestling, a spectator stand was built. The stadium currently has a capacity of more than 20,000 people, and every year, especially on the 14th of Farvardin (3 April), people who are interested in watching the wrestling are brought to this place. The competitions that will be held in this place on the 14th and 15th of Farvardin (3 and 4 April) will be broadcast live on the TV channel Sports in Iran.
