= Kalateh-ye Reza =

Kalateh-ye Reza (Persian: كلاته رضا) may refer to:

- Kalateh-ye Reza, North Khorasan

== See also ==
- Kalateh-ye Reza Khan
