= Fartan-e Tazeh =

Village in North Khorasan province, Iran

Fartan-e Tazeh Persian: فرطان تازه
- Village
- Location within Iran
- Coordinates: 37°02′55″N 57°32′27″E
- Country: Iran
- Province: North Khorasan
- County: Esfarayen
- District: Central
- Rural District: Azari

Population (2016)
  - Total: 1,301
- Time zone: UTC+3:30 (IRST)

Fartan-e Tazeh (Persian: فرطان تازه) (Note: Also romanized as Farţān-e Tāzeh; also known as Fartan) is a village in Azari Rural District of the Central District in Esfarayen County, North Khorasan province, Iran.

== Demographics ==
=== Population ===
At the time of the 2006 National Census, the village's population was 1,175 in 263 households. The following census in 2011 counted 1,312 people in 371 households. The 2016 census measured the population of the village as 1,301 people in 406 households.
