= Kalateh-ye Mirza Rahim =

Village in North Khorasan province, Iran

Kalateh-ye Mirza Rahim Persian: كلاته ميرزارحيم
- Village
- Location within Iran
- Coordinates: 37°00′16″N 57°28′45″E
- Country: Iran
- Province: North Khorasan
- County: Esfarayen
- District: Central
- Rural District: Azari

Population (2016)
  - Total: 1,078
- Time zone: UTC+3:30 (IRST)

Kalateh-ye Mirza Rahim (Persian: كلاته ميرزارحيم) (Note: Also romanized as Kalāteh-ye Mīrzā Raḩīm) is a village in Azari Rural District of the Central District in Esfarayen County, North Khorasan province, Iran.

== Demographics ==
=== Population ===
At the time of the 2006 National Census, the village's population was 780 in 176 households. The following census in 2011 counted 1,099 people in 273 households. The 2016 census measured the population of the village as 1,078 people in 290 households.
