= Sast =

Village in North Khorasan province, Iran

Sast Persian: سست
- Village
- Location within Iran
- Coordinates: 37°08′07″N 57°32′03″E
- Country: Iran
- Province: North Khorasan
- County: Esfarayen
- District: Central
- Rural District: Ruin

Population (2016)
  - Total: 2,540
- Time zone: UTC+3:30 (IRST)

Sast (Persian: سست) is a village in Ruin Rural District of the Central District in Esfarayen County, North Khorasan province, Iran.

== Demographics ==
=== Population ===
At the time of the 2006 National Census, the village's population was 2,586 in 514 households. The following census in 2011 counted 2,616 people in 641 households. The 2016 census measured the population of the village as 2,540 people in 718 households, the most populous in its rural district.
