= Daman Kuh Rural District =

Rural district in North Khorasan province, Iran

Daman Kuh Rural District Persian: دهستان دامن كوه
- Rural District
- Location within Iran
- Coordinates: 37°08′N 57°10′E
- Country: Iran
- Province: North Khorasan
- County: Esfarayen
- District: Zorqabad
- Established: 1987
- Capital: Chahar Borj

Population (2016)
  - Total: 7,252
- Time zone: UTC+3:30 (IRST)

Daman Kuh Rural District (Persian: دهستان دامن كوه) is in Zorqabad District of Esfarayen County, North Khorasan province, Iran. Its capital is the village of Chahar Borj.

== Demographics ==
=== Population ===
At the time of the 2006 National Census, the rural district's population (as a part of the Central District) was 7,887 in 1,825 households. There were 7,641 inhabitants in 2,065 households at the following census of 2011. The 2016 census measured the population of the rural district as 7,252 in 2,159 households. The most populous of its 24 villages was Chahar Borj, with 1,999 people.

In 2023, the rural district was separated from the district in the formation of Zorqabad District.

=== Other villages in the rural district ===
- Akbarabad
- Astin
- Dehak
- Firuziyeh
- Hebsabad
- Hoseynabad-e Khankowr
- Jafarabad
- Kalateh-ye Khvosh
- Kalateh-ye Mansurabad
- Kalateh-ye Molla Aziz
- Khaledabad
- Sarmaran
- Tuy
- Zari
