= Azari Rural District =

Rural district in North Khorasan province, Iran

Azari Rural District Persian: دهستان آذری
- Rural District
- Location within Iran
- Coordinates: 36°53′N 57°28′E
- Country: Iran
- Province: North Khorasan
- County: Esfarayen
- District: Central
- Established: 1987
- Capital: Abbasabad

Population (2016)
  - Total: 14,203
- Time zone: UTC+3:30 (IRST)

Azari Rural District (Persian: دهستان آذری) is in the Central District of Esfarayen County, North Khorasan province, Iran. Its capital is the village of Abbasabad.

== Demographics ==
=== Population ===
At the time of the 2006 National Census, the rural district's population was 13,596 in 3,318 households. There were 14,762 inhabitants in 4,140 households at the following census of 2011. The 2016 census measured the population of the rural district as 14,203 in 4,221 households. The most populous of its 60 villages was Fartan-e Kohneh, with 2,351 people.

=== Other villages in the rural district ===
- Atimoz
- Fartan-e Tazeh
- Garati
- Jowshaqan
- Kalateh-ye Mirza Rahim
- Kushki
- Qasemabad
