= Tui (name) =

Tui is a (usually) female given name and nickname among the Māori people of New Zealand. It is also Polynesian and Fijian male given name, often coming from the noble title Tu'i. People with this name include:

== Given name ==
- Tui Alailefaleula, American football player
- Tui Flower, New Zealand food writer
- Tui Fox (also known as Tui Hemana), New Zealand singer
- Tui Kamikamica, Fijian rugby union player
- Tui Katoa, Tongan rugby league player
- Tui (Tuimoana) Lolohea, New Zealand rugby league player
- Tui Lyon, Australian roller derby player
- Tui Mayo, New Zealand nurse
- Tui McLauchlan, New Zealand artist
- Tui Ormsby, Australian rugby union player
- Tui Samoa, American football player
- Tui Shipston, New Zealand swimmer
- Tui T. Sutherland, American author
- Prince Tui Teka, New Zealand singer
- Tui St. George Tucker, American composer
- Tui Uru, New Zealand opera singer and broadcaster

=== Fictional people ===
- Tui Mitcham, character in Top of the Lake, a 2013 New Zealand television mini-series

== Surname ==
- Basile Tui, Wallis and Futuna politician
- Fiu Tui, Tuvaluan boxer
- Hoani Tui, New Zealand rugby union player
- Lukhan Salakaia-Loto, formerly Lukhan Tui, Australian rugby union player
- Ruby Tui, New Zealand rugby union player
- Sara González (footballer), Spanish footballer known as Sara Tui
- Saviour Tui, Samoan-New Zealand netball player
- Sione Tui, Australian rugby union player

== See also ==
- Tui (disambiguation)
