= Ruin Rural District =

Rural district in North Khorasan province, Iran

Ruin Rural District Persian: دهستان روئين
- Rural District
- Location within Iran
- Coordinates: 37°11′N 57°25′E
- Country: Iran
- Province: North Khorasan
- County: Esfarayen
- District: Central
- Established: 1987
- Capital: Iraj

Population (2016)
  - Total: 14,135
- Time zone: UTC+3:30 (IRST)

Ruin Rural District (Persian: دهستان روئين) is in the Central District of Esfarayen County, North Khorasan province, Iran. Its capital is the village of Iraj.

== Demographics ==
=== Population ===
At the time of the 2006 National Census, the rural district's population was 15,810 in 3,849 households. There were 15,266 inhabitants in 4,313 households at the following census of 2011. The 2016 census measured the population of the rural district as 14,135 in 4,338 households. The most populous of its 76 villages was Sast, with 718 people.

=== Other villages in the rural district ===
- Borj
- Fariman
- Kalat
- Khushin
- Mahmudi
- Ruin
