= Choukhe Wrestling =

Type of wrestling from Khorasan, Iran

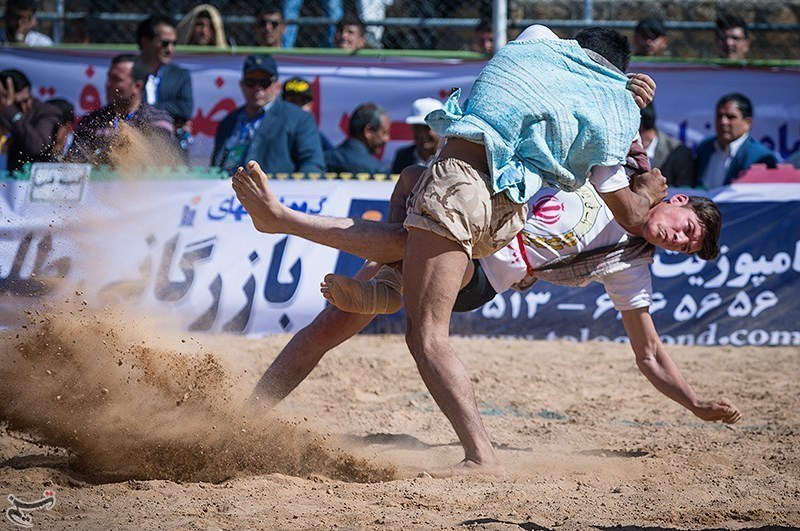
Wrestling with Choukhe in Zeinal-Khan Wrestling Arena

Wrestling with Choukhe (Choukhe Wrestling) a type of wrestling that is played in North Khorasan Province, Iran.

Wrestling with Choukhe, is known today as "Choukhe" and is popular among the Kurds of Khorasan. It has an ancient history and this native sport in many Local ceremonies, especially weddings, have also been common. The Kurds of Khorasan have always attached special importance to this ship and tried to train heroes in this field. This sport was traditionally held in weddings and other celebrations, occasions and ceremonies of Nowruz in the villages. Later it developed and became popular.

== Name origin ==
The word "choukhe" is originally a Kurdish word meaning coat and means a short garment that the chukheh workers fasten with a white scarf. Because this sport has been popular among the Khorasani Kurds for a long time, it is known as "Choukhe".

== Wrestling with Choukhe in other countries ==
Wrestling with Khorasan Choukhe is common in Uzbekistan, Kazakhstan, Tatarstan, etc., with the exception of Khorasan and with the titles of "Gurash", "Gulash", "Alish". Every year, a team of North Khorasan and Khorasan Razavi wrestlers participate in international wrestling competitions on behalf of Iran.

== How to run wrestling competitions with Choukhe ==
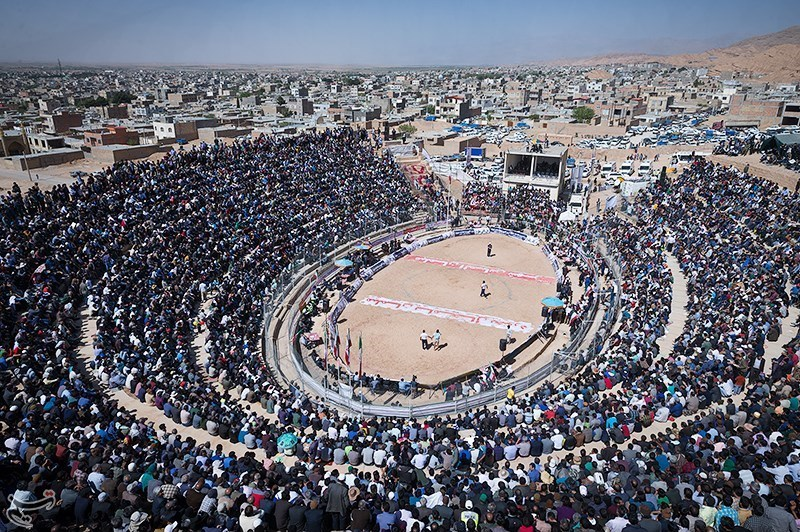
Zeinal-Khan Wrestling Arena in Esfarayen, Iran 2018-4-4

The wrestling match with Choukhe was originally a competition without a specific time and weight of the athletes, and when a person was declared the winner of the field, he could hit his opponent's back or shoulders twice. However, the first regulations that have been compiled and registered for wrestling with Choukhe are related to the meeting of ten experts and selected sports veterans in Greater Khorasan, which was held from May 10 to 12, 1977, in the city of Mashhad, and these rules and regulations until the year 2016 was implemented with amendments and changes. These rules and regulations on December 7, 2016, in Bojnourd and then on August 4, 2017, in Mashhad by the Choukhe Association with the presence of about 200 sports professors, veterans and experts in the field in the Review of Rules and Regulations of Choukhe Wrestling Was reviewed and revised. Choukhe rules and regulations; Including 37 articles and 32 comments, after reviewing meetings and convening meetings of specialized working groups, spending 500 hours in the meetings of the Strategic Council of the Choukhe Keshvar Association, with the expert opinions of the Department of Traditional Sports, was implemented and approved by the Rural Sports Federation Iran has been notified to the General Departments of Sports and Youth of the provinces of the country for implementation.

== Wrestling with Choukhe Prizes ==
Wrestling awards are also different from Chukheh due to its traditional and national nature. In the term, the winners of Choukhe Square are awarded "sugar", the first person is given the first sugar and the second and third people are given according to the other sugars. In addition to sugar, gifts such as camels, rams, carpets and sheep, home appliances, cash and coins will be the income of the champions of this competition. Traditionally, wrestling prizes are considered as symbols of nomadic and rural life. Sometimes tribal weaves such as carpets, rugs and kilims are used. Of course, these awards can be different in different regions, it is important that the awards are commensurate with the dignity of the sport and support the wrestler.

== Time and place of Wrestling With Choukhe ==
The wrestling competitions with Khorasan wrestlers were held on the grass and soft soil on the day of Eid al-Fitr and on the 14th of Farvardin before coming to the mat on the mat. Chuck wrestling has long been held in the heart of nature and open spaces. If most of the ship's pits with the current chukheh that have been established for a long time, such as Pahlavan Jojo pit in Rivadeh, Sultan Zirabeh shrine pit in Imam Verdi Khan Quchan village, Rahvard village pit in Quchan, Zainal Khan pit in Esfarayen, Imam Morshed pit in Farooj and others Pits that are located in recreational areas and the lap of nature.

The wrestling is held on soft ground or grass and with the presence of large crowds of men and women, old and young. Today, these competitions are held in the middle of winter and in February in Maneh and Samolghan, on the 8th of Farvardin in Rivadeh, on the 12th of Farvardin every year in Shirvan, on the 13th of Farvardin in Bojnourd as a province with the presence of famous heroes of this region. But the main and national competitions are held every year on the 14th of Farvardin in God Zainal Khan of Esfarayen city.

== Wrestling with Choukhe equipment ==
1. Chukheh: Chukheh, which was the woolen garment of shepherds and farmers and in fact the old clothes of the Kurds of Khorasan. Chukhe used to be a thick and durable coat with sleeves, but today it has become a sleeveless linen vest.
2. Belt : A belt or shawl that is fastened around the waist on the chukheh and holds the body firmly like a stone (Kevir) and wraps the skirt of the chokheh around it. The belt in fact Kurdish Poshti or Poshtend, which used to be worn around the waist of every Iranian three times, based on the three principles of "good thinking, good speech and good deeds" and is a relic of the Zoroastrian belt called Kushti. It was said to consist of seventy-two white threads of fleece woven by pious women in six twelve threads. The belt is a symbol of power in the ancient myths of human civilization. Like the Shem-set that the gods and kings of ancient Egypt carried with them.
3. Shorts: Shorts, which are similar to wrestling shorts, except that they fold slightly upwards.
4. Davul and Sorna: With the sound of davul and sorna singing of Kermanj musicians, the wrestler moves around the wrestling field and warms himself up and prepares for the competition. The sound of davul and sorna, which is the rhythm of war, is also a vocal call for the news of the ship and asks people to gather and watch the ship with all their hearts and souls.
5. Wrestling field: Wrestling field which is a place 10 meters by 10 meters and the ship is done there.

== Choukhe is one of the handicrafts of Khorasan, especially North Khorasan ==
Chinese sheep wool in North Khorasan is known among the Kurds as Pirin Brin. The other wools that are plucked several times from the body of larger sheep are called "Harry". Or "toon" is prepared and the threads are woven together in a uniform and cohesive manner, and a cloth made of loa or harry is made, and this cloth is called "choukh". Athletes usually sew the choukh cloth to be turned into coats, suits, and leggings. Was named Choukhe, and the ship became known as the Choukhe Ship. It was in such a way that no other fabric survived in the wrestlers' fight like the Choukhe fabric.

Wrestling with Choukhe Field

Wrestling field which is a circle with a diameter of 10 meters and the ship is held there. The ship is performed in a traditional way without stereotypes (ship on the ground and with serena and Davul). The whole beauty of the ship is its traditional way of holding it, which can be attractive to all walks of life. Shipwreck is always held outdoors in the heart of nature and recreational places and on soft ground or grass. It is necessary to take this into account as much as possible now. Shaking hands before wrestling is also one of the beauties of this sport. Traditional and famous shipwrecks in cities such as Quchan, Esfarayen and Rivadeh such as Rahvard and Sultan Zirabeh wells and Zeinal Khan and Jejo springs are very clear examples of this.

== Davul and Sorna ==
By playing the Davul and Sorna by the sections, the wrestler move around the competition field, warm themselves and prepare for the competition. The sound of Davul and Sorna is also a song for the news of the ship and asks people to gather and watch the ship with all their hearts and souls. Kurdish music that is played with heavy and martial themes. Two musicians, Serna and Davul, give a special atmosphere to the sport of wrestling by playing music. It reaches its peak and increases the speed of Davul and Sorna wood.
