= Milanlu Rural District =

Rural district in North Khorasan province, Iran

Milanlu Rural District Persian: دهستان ميلانلو
- Rural District
- Location within Iran
- Coordinates: 37°08′N 57°43′E
- Country: Iran
- Province: North Khorasan
- County: Esfarayen
- District: Central
- Established: 1987
- Capital: Parkanlu

Population (2016)
  - Total: 3,904
- Time zone: UTC+3:30 (IRST)

Milanlu Rural District (Persian: دهستان ميلانلو) is in the Central District of Esfarayen County, North Khorasan province, Iran. Its capital is the village of Parkanlu.

== Demographics ==
=== Population ===
At the time of the 2006 National Census, the rural district's population was 3,936 in 891 households. There were 3,293 inhabitants in 911 households at the following census of 2011. The 2016 census measured the population of the rural district as 3,904 in 1,151 households. The most populous of its 46 villages was Ordaghan, with 767 people.

=== Other villages in the rural district ===
- Anushirvan
- Barastu
- Bidvaz
- Dar Parchin-e Olya
- Dar Parchin-e Sofla
- Ganjdan
- Hasanabad
- Hesar-e Kazimabad
- Jan Ahmadi
- Kalateh-ye Habib
- Kalateh-ye Pialeh
- Karimabad-e Olya
- Qaleh-ye Sefid
- Qazaqi
- Sar Cheshmeh
- Shur-e Bala
