= Chahar Muran, Khuzestan =

Chahar Muran چهارموران
- Village
- Location within Iran
- Coordinates: 32°02′47″N 49°41′37″E
- Country: Iran
- Province: Khuzestan
- County: Izeh
- Bakhsh: Central
- Rural District: Pian

Population (2006)
  - Total: 82
- Time zone: UTC+3:30 (IRST)
  - Summer (DST): UTC+4:30 (IRDT)

Chahar Muran (Persian: چهارموران, also Romanized as Chahār Mūrān) is a village in Pian Rural District, in the Central District of Izeh County, Khuzestan Province, Iran. At the 2006 census, its population was 82, in 12 families.
