= Chehel Dokhtaran, Kohgiluyeh and Boyer-Ahmad =

Chehel Dokhtaran چهل دختران
- Village
- Location within Iran
- Coordinates: 31°08′01″N 50°37′31″E
- Country: Iran
- Province: Kohgiluyeh and Boyer-Ahmad
- County: Boyer-Ahmad
- Bakhsh: Ludab
- Rural District: Ludab

Population (2006)
  - Total: 19
- Time zone: UTC+3:30 (IRST)
  - Summer (DST): UTC+4:30 (IRDT)

Chehel Dokhtaran (Persian: چهل دختران, also Romanized as Chehel Dokhtarān; also known as Cheheldokhtarān) is a village in Ludab Rural District, Ludab District, Boyer-Ahmad County, Kohgiluyeh and Boyer-Ahmad Province, Iran. At the 2006 census, its population was 19, in 4 families.
