= Rezqabad, Kerman =

Rezqabad رزق اباد
- Village
- Location within Iran
- Coordinates: 28°16′31″N 57°41′31″E
- Country: Iran
- Province: Kerman
- County: Anbarabad
- Bakhsh: Esmaili
- Rural District: Ganjabad

Population (2006)
  - Total: 95
- Time zone: UTC+3:30 (IRST)
  - Summer (DST): UTC+4:30 (IRDT)

Rezqabad (Persian: رزق اباد, also Romanized as Rezqābād) is a village in Ganjabad Rural District, Esmaili District, Anbarabad County, Kerman Province, Iran. At the 2006 census, its population was 95, in 22 families.
