= Zorqabad Rural District =

Rural district in North Khorasan province, Iran

Zorqabad Rural District Persian: دهستان زرق آباد
- Rural District
- Location within Iran
- Coordinates: 36°58′N 57°10′E
- Country: Iran
- Province: North Khorasan
- County: Esfarayen
- District: Zorqabad
- Established: 1987
- Capital: Ajqan

Population (2016)
  - Total: 4,619
- Time zone: UTC+3:30 (IRST)

Zorqabad Rural District (Persian: دهستان زرق آباد) is in Zorqabad District of Esfarayen County, North Khorasan province, Iran. Its capital is the village of Ajqan. The previous capital of the rural district was the village of Rezqabad. (Note: Also known as Zorqabad)

== Demographics ==
=== Population ===
At the time of the 2006 National Census, the rural district's population (as a part of the Central District) was 6,831 in 1,686 households. There were 6,409 inhabitants in 1,802 households at the following census of 2011. The 2016 census measured the population of the rural district as 4,619 in 1,533 households. The most populous of its 59 villages was Chehel Hesar, with 1,143 people.

In 2023, the rural district was separated from the district in the establishment of Zorqabad District.

=== Other villages in the rural district ===
- Adkan
- Aliabad
- Chehel Dokhtaran
- Derazpey
- Emarat
- Gazrabi
- Gurpan
- Hoseynabad-e Kordha
- Kalateh-ye Alimardan
- Kalateh-ye Bozorg
- Kalateh-ye Nish Kesh
- Kalateh-ye Reza
- Kalateh-ye Shur
- Kheyrabad
- Kuran
- Mehdiabad
- Mehrabad
- Naqiabad
- Nish Kesh
- Qaleh Now-ye Anqolabi
- Rahimabad
- Sorkh Cheshmeh
- Zamanabad
