= Kalateh-ye Mirza, Darmian =

Kalateh-ye Mirza كلاته ميرزا
- Village
- Location within Iran
- Coordinates: 32°48′32″N 59°51′46″E
- Country: Iran
- Province: South Khorasan
- County: Darmian
- Bakhsh: Central
- Rural District: Darmian

Population (2006)
  - Total: 44
- Time zone: UTC+3:30 (IRST)
  - Summer (DST): UTC+4:30 (IRDT)

Kalateh-ye Mirza (Persian: كلاته ميرزا, also Romanized as Kalāteh-ye Mīrzā; also known as Kalāt-e Mīrzā) is a village in Darmian Rural District, in the Central District of Darmian County, South Khorasan Province, Iran. At the 2006 census, its population was 44, in 11 families.
