= Kalateh-ye Mirza, Khusf =

Kalateh-ye Mirza كلاته ميرزا
- Village
- Location within Iran
- Coordinates: 32°34′39″N 58°59′49″E
- Country: Iran
- Province: South Khorasan
- County: Khusf
- Bakhsh: Jolgeh-e Mazhan
- Rural District: Jolgeh-e Mazhan

Population (2006)
  - Total: 13
- Time zone: UTC+3:30 (IRST)
  - Summer (DST): UTC+4:30 (IRDT)

Kalateh-ye Mirza (Persian: كلاته ميرزا, also Romanized as Kalāteh-ye Mīrzā and Kalāteh Mīrzā; also known as Mīrza Saiyid Bagher and Mīrzā Seyyed Bāqer) is a village in Jolgeh-e Mazhan Rural District, Jolgeh-e Mazhan District, Khusf County, South Khorasan Province, Iran. At the 2006 census, its population was 13, in 5 families.
