= Chahar Muran, Chaharmahal and Bakhtiari =

Chahar Muran چهارموران
- Village
- Location within Iran
- Coordinates: 32°22′55″N 50°24′47″E
- Country: Iran
- Province: Chaharmahal and Bakhtiari
- County: Kuhrang
- Bakhsh: Central
- Rural District: Dasht-e Zarrin

Population (2006)
  - Total: 271
- Time zone: UTC+3:30 (IRST)
  - Summer (DST): UTC+4:30 (IRDT)

Chahar Muran (Persian: چهارموران, also Romanized as Chahār Mūrān; also known as Chahār Mārān) is a village in Dasht-e Zarrin Rural District, in the Central District of Kuhrang County, Chaharmahal and Bakhtiari Province, Iran. At the 2006 census, its population was 271, in 43 families. The village is populated by Lurs.
