= Esfarayen =

City in North Khorasan province, Iran

Esfarayen Persian: اسفراین
- City
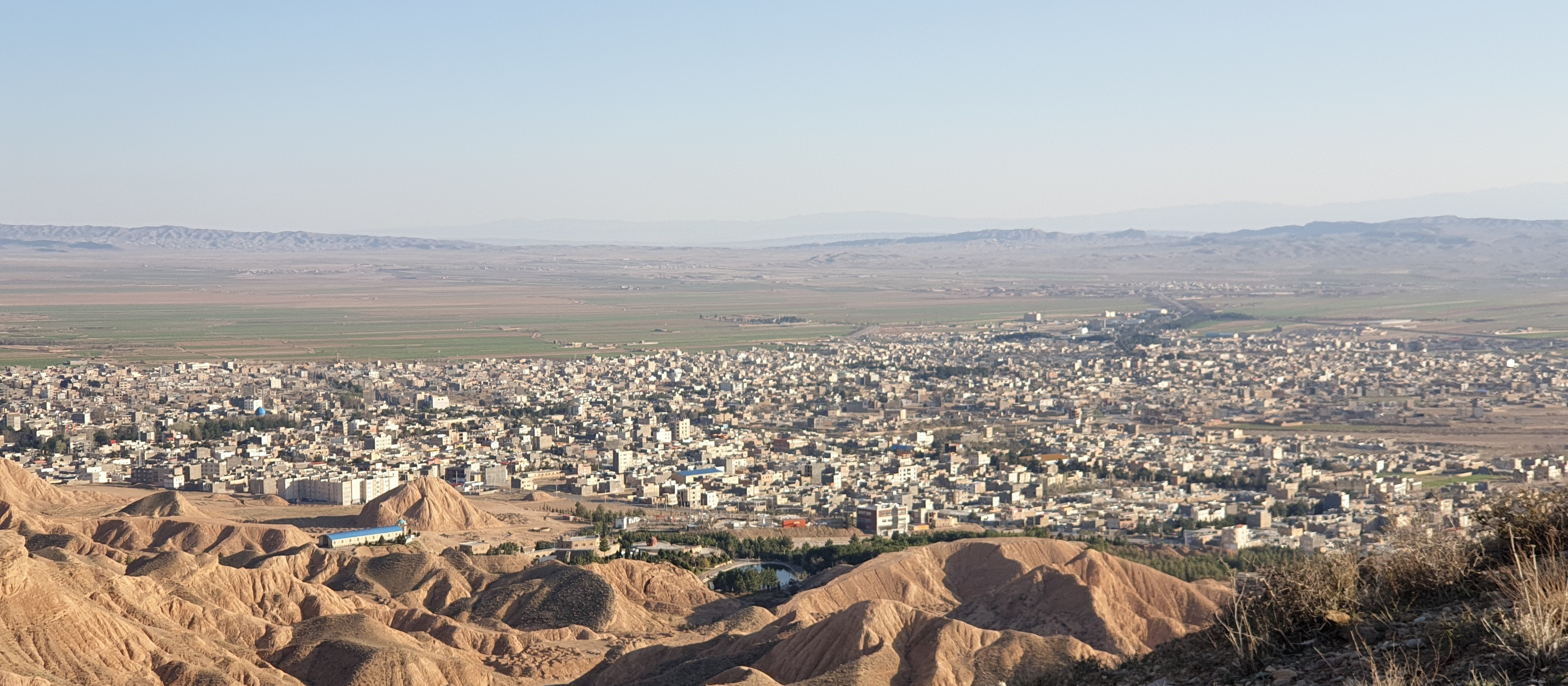
- The city of Esfarayen

- Location within Iran
- Coordinates: 37°04′14″N 57°30′20″E
- Country: Iran
- Province: North Khorasan
- County: Esfarayen
- District: Central

Population (2016)
  - Total: 59,490
- Time zone: UTC+3:30 (IRST)
- Website: esfarayennews.com

Esfarayen (Persian: اسفراین) (Note: Also romanized as Esfarāyen; formerly Meyanābād (ميان آباد), also romanized as Mīānābād and Mīyānābād) is a city in the Central District of Esfarayen County, North Khorasan province, Iran, serving as capital of both the county and the district.

== Demographics ==
=== Ethnicity ===
The majority of the population is Kurdish, with a significant population of Tats and Khorasani Turks. The Kurmanji-speaking Kurds constitute the majority of the population of the city of Esfarayen. According to Javadzadeh (2001), the people of Esfarayen are composed of 4 ethnic groups: the Tatas (Persians), the Turks of Khorasan, the Kurds of Kermanshah, and the Hazaras (Barbarians).

=== Population ===
At the time of the 2006 National Census, the city's population was 51,321 in 13,376 households. The following census in 2011 counted 60,372 people in 17,049 households. The 2016 census measured the population of the city as 59,490 people in 17,466 households.

== Geography ==
=== Location ===
Esfarayen County neighbors Sabzevar County from the south and southeast, with Faruj County from the northeast, Shirvan County from the north and with Bojnord County from the west, and is located in the southern margin of the Aladagh Mountains along the eastern stretch of the Alborz mountain range. The altitude of Esfarayen is 1,260 meters above sea level.

== Education ==
Esfarayen is a university city in northeastern Iran, and in recent years, with the establishment of several universities, the student population of this city has grown.

Esfarayen Higher Education Complex

Esfarayen University of Technology

Islamic Azad University of Esfarayen

Esfarayen University of Medical Sciences

== Sources ==
- Le Strange, Guy (1905). The Lands of the Eastern Caliphate: Mesopotamia, Persia, and Central Asia, from the Moslem Conquest to the Time of Timur. Cambridge: Cambridge University Press. p. 202.
