= Zorqabad District =

District in North Khorasan province, Iran

Zorqabad District Persian: بخش زرق‌آباد
- District
- Location within Iran
- Coordinates: 37°03′N 57°10′E
- Country: Iran
- Province: North Khorasan
- County: Esfarayen
- Established: 2023
- Capital: Rezqabad
- Time zone: UTC+3:30 (IRST)

Zorqabad District (Persian: بخش زرق‌آباد) is in Esfarayen County, North Khorasan province, Iran. Its capital is the village of Rezqabad, whose population at the time of the 2016 National Census was 4,619 in 1,533 households.

== History ==
In 2023, Daman Kuh and Zorqabad Rural Districts were separated from the Central District in the formation of Zorqabad District.

== Demographics ==
=== Administrative divisions ===
Zorqabad District
Administrative Divisions
Daman Kuh RD
Zorqabad RD
RD = Rural District
