= Central District (Esfarayen County) =

District in North Khorasan province, Iran

Central District (Esfarayen County) Persian: بخش مرکزی شهرستان اسفراین
- District
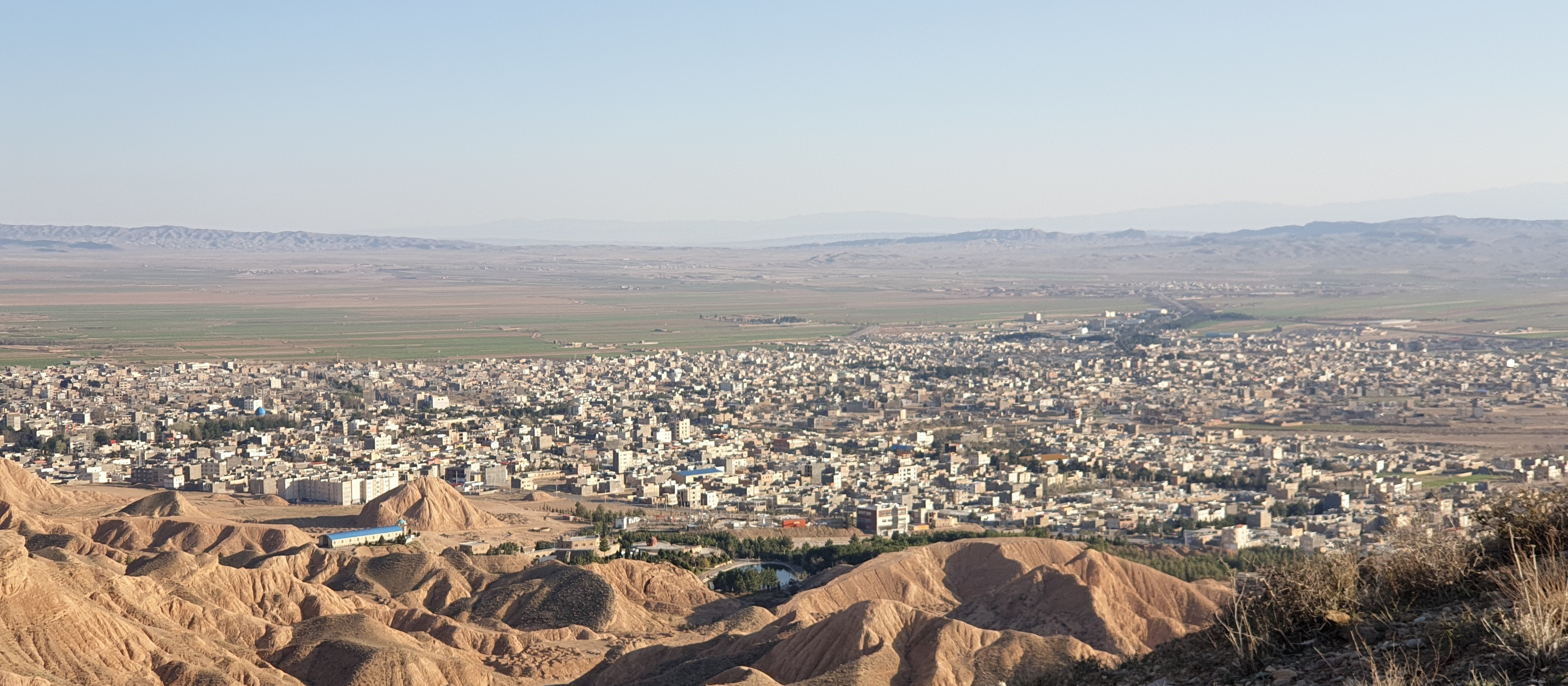
- The city of Esfarayen

- Location within Iran
- Coordinates: 37°00′N 57°31′E
- Country: Iran
- Province: North Khorasan
- County: Esfarayen
- Capital: Esfarayen

Population (2016)
  - Total: 103,603
- Time zone: UTC+3:30 (IRST)

The Central District of Esfarayen County (Persian: بخش مرکزی شهرستان اسفراین) is in North Khorasan province, Iran. Its capital is the city of Esfarayen.

== History ==
In 2023, Daman Kuh and Zorqabad Rural Districts were separated from the district in the formation of Zorqabad District.

== Demographics ==
=== Population ===
At the time of the 2006 National Census, the district's population was 99,381 in 24,945 households. The following census in 2011 counted 107,743 people in 30,280 households. The 2016 census measured the population of the district as 103,603 inhabitants in 30,868 households.

=== Administrative divisions ===
Central District (Esfarayen County) Population
Administrative Divisions	2006	2011	2016
Azari RD	13,596	14,762	14,203
Daman Kuh RD (Note: Transferred to Zorqabad District after the 2016 census)	7,887	7,641	7,252
Milanlu RD	3,936	3,293	3,904
Ruin RD	15,810	15,266	14,135
Zorqabad RD	6,831	6,409	4,619
Esfarayen (city)	51,321	60,372	59,490
Total	99,381	107,743	103,603
RD = Rural District
