= Esfarayen County =

County in North Khorasan province, Iran

Esfarayen County Persian: شهرستان اسفراین
- County
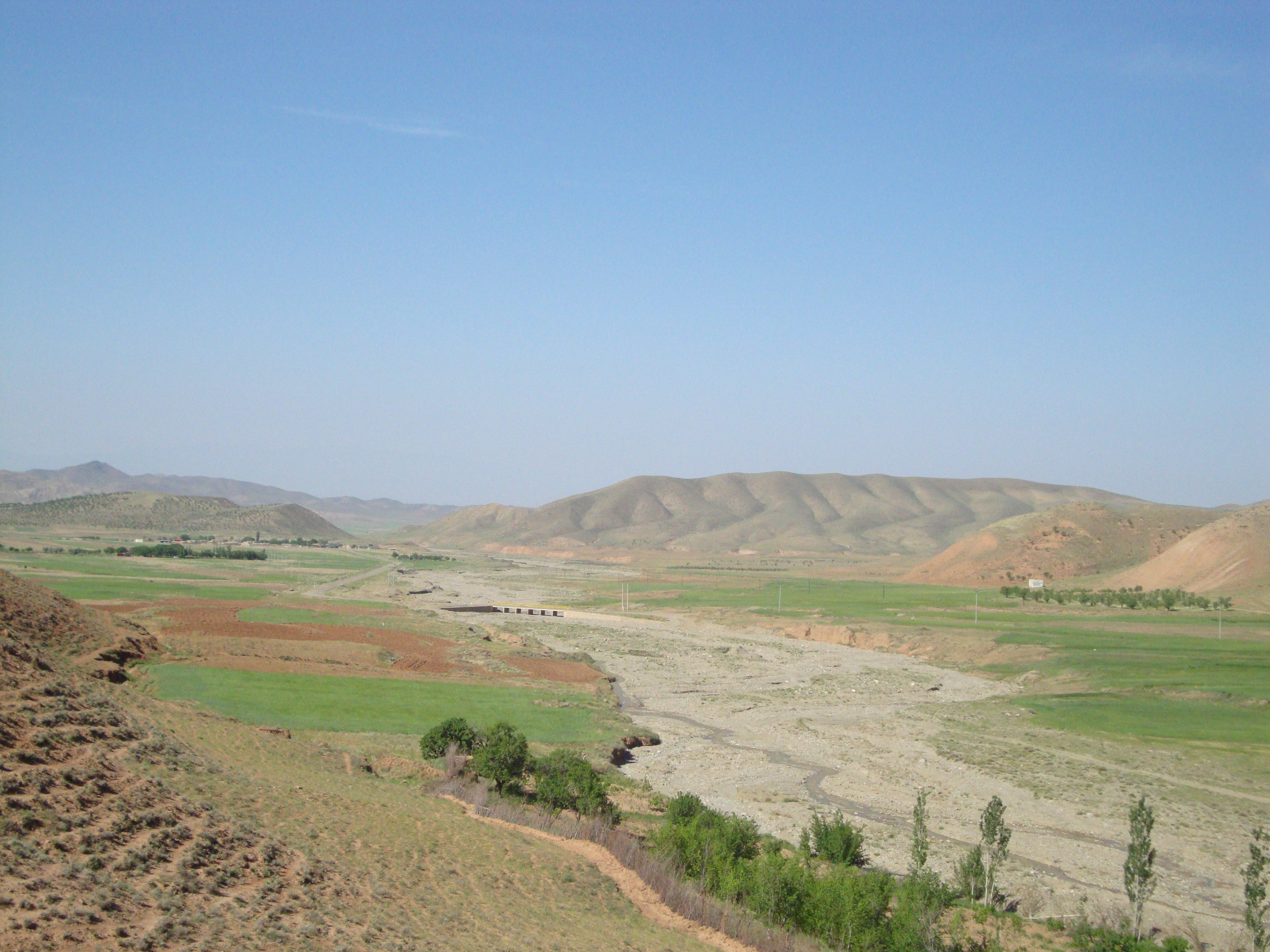
- Branch of the Kal Velayat River

- Location of Esfarayen County in North Khorasan province (bottom right, green)

- Location of North Khorasan province in Iran
- Coordinates: 36°57′N 57°31′E
- Country: Iran
- Province: North Khorasan
- Capital: Esfarayen
- Districts: Central, Zorqabad

Population (2016)
  - Total: 120,513
- Time zone: UTC+3:30 (IRST)

Esfarayen County (Persian: شهرستان اسفراین) is in North Khorasan province, Iran. Its capital is the city of Esfarayen.

== History ==
In 2023, Daman Kuh and Zorqabad Rural Districts were separated from the Central District in the formation of Zorqabad District. Bam and Safiabad District (Note: Renamed the Central District of Bam and Safiabad County) was separated from the county in the establishment of Bam and Safiabad County and renamed the Central District.

== Demographics ==
=== Population ===
At the time of the 2006 National Census, the county's population was 119,152 in 30,307 households. The following census in 2011 counted 127,012 people in 35,903 households. The 2016 census measured the population of the county as 120,513 in 36,519 households.

=== Administrative divisions ===
Esfarayen County's population history and administrative structure over three consecutive censuses are shown in the following table.

Esfarayen County Population
Administrative Divisions	2006	2011	2016
Central District	99,381	107,743	103,603
Azari RD	13,596	14,762	14,203
Daman Kuh RD	7,887	7,641	7,252
Milanlu RD	3,936	3,293	3,904
Ruin RD	15,810	15,266	14,135
Zorqabad RD	6,831	6,409	4,619
Esfarayen (city)	51,321	60,372	59,490
Bam and Safiabad District (Note: Transferred to Bam and Safiabad County after the 2016 census and renamed the Central District of Bam and Safiabad County)	19,771	19,133	16,887
Bam RD	9,041	7,888	6,902
Safiabad RD	7,683	7,718	6,558
Safiabad (city)	3,047	3,527	3,427
Zorqabad District (Note: Established after the 2016 census)			
Daman Kuh RD			
Zorqabad RD			
Total	119,152	127,012	120,513
RD = Rural District

== See also ==
Media related to Esfarayen County at Wikimedia Commons
