= Jafarabad =

Jafarabad may refer to:

== Armenia ==
- Getashen, Armavir, formerly called Jafarabad

== Azerbaijan ==
- Aşağı Fərəcan, formerly called Jafarabad
- Cəfərabad, Jabrayil
- Cəfərabad, Shaki

== India ==
- Jafrabad, a city and a municipality in Amreli district, Gujarat
  - Jafarabad State, a former princely state, in the Kathiawar Peninsula on the Gujarat coast
  - Jafrabad taluka, a subdistrict of Amreli District
  - Jafarabadi buffalo, an Indian buffalo breed
- Jafrabad, Bhopal, a village in the Bhopal district of Madhya Pradesh
- Jaffrabad, Delhi, a town in the state of Delhi
  - Jaffrabad metro station, Delhi Metro
- Jafrabad, Jalna, a tehsil in Jalna district, Maharashtra
- Jafrabad, Murshidabad, a census town in West Bengal
- Jaffrabad, Tamil Nadu, a town in the state of Tamil Nadu
- Jafarabad, Uttar Pradesh, a town in Jaunpur district, Uttar Pradesh

== Pakistan ==
- Jafarabad, Hunza, a town in Gilgit-Baltistan
- Jafarabad District, a district in Balochistan

== Iran ==
=== Alborz Province ===
- Jafarabad, Alborz, Iran

=== Ardabil Province ===
- Jafarabad, Ardabil, a city in Bileh Savar County
- Jafarabad, Khalkhal, a village in Khalkhal County
- Jafarabad, Meshgin Shahr, a village in Meshgin Shahr County

=== Chaharmahal and Bakhtiari Province ===
- Jafarabad, Chaharmahal and Bakhtiari, a village in Kiar County

=== East Azerbaijan Province ===
- Jafarabad, Ahar, a village in Ahar County
- Jafarabad, Charuymaq, a village in Charuymaq County
- Jafarabad, Khoda Afarin, a village in Khoda Afarin County
- Jafarabad, Varzaqan, a village in Varzaqan County

=== Fars Province ===
- Jafarabad, Arsanjan, a village in Arsanjan County
- Jafarabad-e Olya, Fars, a village in Bavanat County
- Jafarabad-e Sofla, Fars, a village in Bavanat County
- Jafarabad, Forg, a village in Darab County
- Jafarabad, Rostaq, a village in Darab County
- Jafarabad, Eqlid, a village in Eqlid County
- Jafarabad, Hasanabad, a village in Eqlid County
- Jafarabad, Fasa, a village in Fasa County
- Jafarabad, Now Bandegan, a village in Fasa County
- Jafarabad, Kazerun, a village in Kazerun County
- Jafarabad, Neyriz, a village in Neyriz County
- Jafarabad, Qatruyeh, a village in Neyriz County
- Jafarabad, alternate name of Mazraeh-ye Jafarabad, Fars, a village in Neyriz County
- Jafarabad, Rostam, a village in Rostam County
- Jafarabad, Sepidan, a village in Sepidan County

=== Gilan Province ===
- Jafarabad, Gilan, a village in Rasht County

=== Golestan Province ===
- Jafarabad, Golestan, a village in Gorgan County
- Jafarabad-e Namtalu, a village in Ramian County

=== Hamadan Province ===
- Jafarabad, Asadabad, a village in Asadabad County
- Jafarabad, Bahar, a village in Bahar County
- Jafarabad, Nahavand, a village in Nahavand County
- Jafarabad, alternate name of Zareabad, Hamadan, a village in Nahavand County
- Jafarabad, Razan, a village in Razan County

=== Hormozgan Province ===
- Jafarabad, Minab, a village in Mindab County
- Jafarabad, Tukahur, a village in Mindab County
- Jafarabad, Rudan, a village in Rudan County

=== Ilam Province ===
- Jafarabad, Darreh Shahr, a village in Darreh Shahr County
- Jafarabad, Ilam, a village in Ilam County

=== Isfahan Province ===
- Jafarabad, Ardestan, a village in Ardestan County
- Jafarabad, Zavareh, a village in Ardestan County
- Jafarabad, Khorram Dasht, a village in Kashan County
- Jafarabad, Khur and Biabanak, a village in Khur and Biabanak County
- Jafarabad, Lenjan, a village in Lenjan County
- Jafarabad, Tiran and Karvan, a village in Tiran and Karvan County

=== Kerman Province ===
- Jafarabad, Bardsir, a village in Bardsir County
- Jafarabad, Fahraj, a village in Fahraj County
- Jafarabad, Jiroft, a village in Jiroft County
- Jafarabad, Rafsanjan, a village in Rafsanjan County
- Jafarabad, Ferdows, a village in Rafsanjan County
- Jafarabad, Rigan, a village in Rigan County
- Jafarabad, Rudbar-e Jonubi, a village in Rudbar-e Jonubi County
- Jafarabad, Shahr-e Babak, a village in Shahr-e Babak County
- Jafarabad, Sharifabad, a village in Sirjan County
- Jafarabad, Zeydabad, a village in Sirjan County

=== Kermanshah Province ===
- Jafarabad, Kermanshah, a village in Kermanshah County
- Jafarabad, Kuzaran, a village in Kermanshah County
- Jafarabad, Sonqor, a village in Sonqor County

=== Khuzestan Province ===
- Jafarabad, Andika, a village in Andika County

=== Kurdistan Province ===
- Jafarabad, Bijar, a village in Bijar County
- Jafarabad, Chang Almas, a village in Bijar County
- Jafarabad, Dehgolan, a village in Dehgolan County
- Jafarabad, Divandarreh, a village in Divandarreh County

=== Lorestan Province ===
- Jafarabad, Borujerd, a village in Borujerd County
- Jafarabad, Delfan, a village in Delfan County
- Jafarabad, former name of Vanu, a village in Delfan County
- Jafarabad-e Olya, Delfan, a village in Delfan County
- Jafarabad-e Olya, Kakavand, a village in Delfan County
- Jafarabad-e Sofla, Lorestan, a village in Delfan County
- Jafarabad, Dowreh, a village in Dowreh County
- Jafarabad, Kuhdasht, a village in Kuhdasht County
- Jafarabad Khan-e Zeytun, a village in Kuhdasht County
- Jafarabad, Selseleh, a village in Selseleh County
- Jafarabad, Firuzabad, a village in Selseleh County
- Jafarabad, alternate name of Posht-e Tang-e Firuzabad, a village in Selseleh County

=== Markazi Province ===
- Jafarabad, Ashtian, a village in Ashtian County
- Jafarabad, Khomeyn, a village in Khomeyn County
- Jafarabad, Saveh, a village in Saveh County

=== Mazandaran Province ===
- Jafarabad, Amol, a village in Amol County
- Jafarabad, Sari, a village in Sari County

=== North Khorasan Province ===
- Jafarabad, Bojnord, a village in Bojnord County
- Jafarabad, Esfarayen, a village in Esfarayen County
- Jafarabad-e Sofla, North Khorasan, a village in Faruj County

=== Qazvin Province ===
- Jafarabad, Qazvin

=== Qom Province ===
- Jafarabad, former name of Jafariyeh, a city in Qom Province, Iran
- Jafarabad, Qom, a village in Qom Province, Iran
- Jafarabad, Jafarabad, a village in Qom Province, Iran
- Jafarabad District (Iran), a district in Qom Province, Iran
- Jafarabad Rural District, a rural district in Qom Province, Iran

=== Razavi Khorasan Province ===
- Jafarabad, Fariman, a village in Fariman County
- Jafarabad, Gonabad, a village in Gonabad County
- Jafarabad, Khalilabad, a village in Khalilabad County
- Jafarabad, Nishapur, a village in Nishapur County
- Jafarabad-e Olya, Quchan Atiq, a village in Quchan County
- Jafarabad-e Olya, Sudlaneh, a village in Quchan County
- Jafarabad, Rashtkhvar, a village in Rashtkhvar County
- Jafarabad, Torbat-e Heydarieh, a village in Torbat-e Heydarieh County
- Jafarabad, Torbat-e Jam, a village in Torbat-e Jam County
- Jafarabad, Zaveh, a village in Zaveh County

=== Semnan Province ===
- Jafarabad, Semnan, a village in Shahrud County
- Jafarabad, Beyarjomand, a village in Shahrud County

=== Sistan and Baluchestan Province ===
- Jafarabad, Bampur, a village in Bampur County
- Jafarabad, Khash, a village in Khash County

=== South Khorasan Province ===
- Jafarabad, Khusf, a village in Khusf County
- Jafarabad, Qaen, a village in Qaen County
- Jafarabad, Sedeh, a village in Qaen County
- Jafarabad, Tabas, a village in Tabas County

=== Tehran Province ===
- Jafarabad, Tehran, a village in Damavand County
- Jafarabad-e Akhavan, a village in Varamin County
- Jafarabad-e Baqeraf, a village in Tehran County
- Jafarabad-e Jangal, Damavand, a village in Damavand County
- Jafarabad-e Jangal, Tehran, a village in Tehran County
- Jafarabad-e Jangal, Varamin, a village in Varamin County

=== West Azerbaijan Province ===
- Jafarabad, Khoy, a village in Khoy County
- Jafarabad, Marhemetabad-e Jonubi, a village in Miandoab County
- Jafarabad, Mokriyan-e Shomali, a village in Miandoab County
- Jafarabad, Zarrineh Rud-e Shomali, a village in Miandoab County
- Jafarabad, Showt, a village in Showt County

=== Yazd Province ===
- Jafarabad, Behabad, a village in Behabad County
- Jafarabad, Khatam, a village in Khatam County

== See also ==
- Jafar (disambiguation)
- Jafarpur, a census town in West Bengal, India
- Jaffarpur, a village in Punjab, India
- Jaffarpur Kalan, a village in Delhi, India
- Jaffarpur, Jalandhar, a village in Punjab, India
