= Al-Ja'fari =

Ja'fari (Arabic: الجعفري Persian: جعفری) is a surname commonly associated with descendants of Ja'far al-Sadiq, an important Muslim scholar and the 6th Shia Imam. In South Asia, Persia and the Levant, those of this genealogy, also often take the honorific title of Sayyid. Descendants of Ja'far al-Sadiq can most commonly be found amongst the Shi'i of Iraq, Iran and the Indian subcontinent. Some Sunni Muslims also associate with the surname Ja’fari.

Variant transliterations include Ja'fari, Jaafari, Jafari, Jafri, Jafry, and Jaffrey.

== Notable people with the surname ==
=== Jafari ===
- Afshin Jafari, known as Afshin (born 1978), Iranian pop singer and songwriter
- Ali Jafari, Iranian computer scientist
- Alireza Jafari (born 1994), Iranian actor
- Alireza Jafari (child soldier) (2014/2015–2026), Iranian child soldier
- Amir Jafari (born 1974), Iranian actor
- Amir Jafari (powerlifter) (born 1985), Iranian Paralympic powerlifter
- Amir Jafari (footballer) (born 2002), Iranian footballer
- Azra Jafari (born 1978), Afghani politician, mayor of Nili, the capital of Daykundi Province in Afghanistan
- Bashar Jaafari (born 1956), Syrian diplomat
- Davoud Danesh-Jafari (born 1954), Iranian politician, Minister of Economy and Finance Affairs
- Hadi Jafari (born 1982), Iranian footballer
- Ibrahim al-Jaafari (born 1947), Iraqi politician, Prime Minister of Iraq
- Jonathan Aryan Jafari, known as JonTron (born 1990), American comedian, internet personality, and video game critic
- Kamal Aljafari (born 1972), Palestinian filmmaker
- Mehran Jafari (born 1985), Iranian footballer
- Mohammad Ali Jafari (born 1957), Iranian military figure, commander of the Army of the Guardians of the Islamic Revolution in Iran
- Mohammad-Taqi Ja'fari (1923–1998), Iranian scholar, thinker, and theologian
- Sara Jafari (born 1993), English novelist and editor

=== Jafri ===
- Abbas Jafri (born 1991), Pakistani politician and model
- Abdel Fattah Jafri (born 1950), Moroccan footballer
- Ada Jafri (1924–2015), Pakistani poet
- Ali Sardar Jafri (1913–2000), Urdu writer, poet, critic and film lyricist from India
- Aqeel Jafri (born 1957), Pakistani writer, poet and architect
- Azfar Jafri, Pakistani film director
- Ehsan Jafri (1929–2002), Indian Muslim parliamentarian
- Husain Mohammad Jafri (1938–2019), Pakistani historian
- Liaqat Jafri (born 1971), Indian poet and scholar
- Meezaan Jafri (born 1995), Indian actor
- Muhammad Abbas Jafri, Pakistani politician
- Murtaza Jafri (born 1958), Pakistani artist
- Sacha Jafri (born 1977), British artist
- Syed Ali Aslam Jafri (1943–2021), Pakistani judge
- Syed Aminul Hasan Jafri (born 1955), Indian journalist and politician
- Syed Imran Raza Jafri (born 1979), Pakistani writer and scholar
- Wasim Jafri, Pakistani gastroenterologist
- Zakia Jafri (1938/1939–2025), Indian human rights activist
- Zamir Jafri (1916–1999), Pakistani poet and humourist
- Saiyid Zaheer Husain Jafri (1957), Indian Historian

=== Jaffri ===
- Ainy Jaffri (born 1981), Pakistani actress and model
- Naila Jaffri (1965–2021), Pakistani actress and director
- Rizwan Ali Jaffri (born 1992), Pakistani model, actor, and singer
- Saman Sultana Jaffri, Pakistani politician

=== Jaffry ===
- Waqar Jaffry (born 1980), Pakistani academic and scientist

=== Jaffrey ===
- Javed Jaffrey (born 1963), Indian actor, dancer, and comedian, son of Jagdeep
- Madhur Jaffrey (born 1933), Indian actress and food writer
- Naved Jaffrey (born 1969), Indian television producer, son of Jagdeep
- Raza Jaffrey (born 1975), British actor and singer
- Saeed Jaffrey (1929–2015), Indian-born British actor
- Sakina Jaffrey (born 1962), Indian-American actress
- Syed Ishtiaq Ahmed Jaffrey, stage name Jagdeep (1939–2020), Indian actor and comedian

== Notable people with the middle name ==
- Masoud Jafari Jozani (born 1948), Iranian film director, screenwriter and film producer

== See also ==
- Ja'far
- Jafar (disambiguation)
- Ja'fari jurisprudence, the school of jurisprudence (fiqh) in Twelver and Isma'ili Shia Islam, named after the sixth Imam, Ja'far al-Sadiq
- Ja'far al-Sadiq, an 8th-century Muslim scholar, Shia imam and scientist
