= Jafarabad-e Olya =

Jafarabad-e Olya or Jafar Abad Olya (Persian: جعفرآباد عليا) may refer to:

- Jafarabad-e Olya, Fars
- Jafarabad-e Olya, Hamadan
- Jafarabad-e Olya, Delfan, Lorestan Province
- Jafarabad-e Olya, Kakavand, Lorestan Province
- Jafarabad-e Olya, Quchan Atiq, Razavi Khorasan Province
- Jafarabad-e Olya, Sudlaneh, Razavi Khorasan Province
