= Jartudeh =

Village in Razavi Khorasan province, Iran

Jartudeh Persian: جرتوده
- Village
- Location within Iran
- Coordinates: 37°05′20″N 58°17′21″E
- Country: Iran
- Province: Razavi Khorasan
- County: Quchan
- District: Quchan Atiq
- Rural District: Yazdan

Population (2016)
  - Total: 325
- Time zone: UTC+3:30 (IRST)

Jartudeh (Persian: جرتوده) (Note: Also romanized as Jartūdah and Jartūdeh) is a village in Yazdan Rural District of Quchan Atiq District in Quchan County, Razavi Khorasan province, Iran.

== Demographics ==
=== Population ===
At the time of the 2006 National Census, the village's population was 482 in 138 households, when it was in Quchan Atiq Rural District of the Central District. The following census in 2011 counted 265 people in 77 households. The 2016 census measured the population of the village as 325 people in 108 households.

In 2020, the rural district was separated from the district in the establishment of Quchan Atiq District, and Jartudeh was transferred to Yazdan Rural District created in the new district.
