= Jafarabad-e Jangal =

Jafarabad-e Jangal (Persian: جعفرابادجنگل) may refer to:

- Jafarabad-e Jangal, Damavand
- Jafarabad-e Jangal, Tehran
- Jafarabad-e Jangal, Varamin
