= Hajji Kahu =

Village in Razavi Khorasan province, Iran

Hajji Kahu Persian: حاجي كاهو
- Village
- Location within Iran
- Coordinates: 37°05′12″N 58°14′15″E
- Country: Iran
- Province: Razavi Khorasan
- County: Quchan
- District: Quchan Atiq
- Rural District: Yazdan

Population (2016)
  - Total: 97
- Time zone: UTC+3:30 (IRST)

Hajji Kahu (Persian: حاجي كاهو) (Note: Also romanized as Haji Kahu, Ḩājī Kāhū, and Ḩājjī Kāhū) is a village in Yazdan Rural District of Quchan Atiq District in Quchan County, Razavi Khorasan province, Iran.

== Demographics ==
=== Population ===
At the time of the 2006 National Census, the village's population was 147 in 31 households, when it was in Quchan Atiq Rural District of the Central District. The following census in 2011 counted 117 people in 29 households. The 2016 census measured the population of the village as 97 people in 28 households.

In 2020, the rural district was separated from the district in the establishment of Quchan Atiq District, and Hajji Kahu was transferred to Yazdan Rural District created in the new district.
