= Filab =

Filab (Persian: فيلاب) may refer to:

- Filab, Khuzestan
- Filab, Razavi Khorasan
