= Yazdanabad-e Sofla =

Village in Razavi Khorasan province, Iran

Yazdanabad-e Sofla Persian: يزدان اباد سفلي
- Village
- Location within Iran
- Coordinates: 37°08′16″N 58°21′51″E
- Country: Iran
- Province: Razavi Khorasan
- County: Quchan
- District: Quchan Atiq
- Rural District: Yazdan

Population (2016)
  - Total: 802
- Time zone: UTC+3:30 (IRST)

Yazdanabad-e Sofla (Persian: يزدان اباد سفلي) (Note: Also romanized as Yazdānābād-e Soflá; also known as Yazdānābād-e Pā’īn) is a village in, and the capital of, Yazdan Rural District in Quchan Atiq District of Quchan County, Razavi Khorasan province, Iran.

== Demographics ==
=== Population ===
At the time of the 2006 National Census, the village's population was 979 in 240 households, when it was in Quchan Atiq Rural District of the Central District. The following census in 2011 counted 877 people in 276 households. The 2016 census measured the population of the village as 802 people in 269 households.

In 2020, the rural district was separated from the district in the establishment of Quchan Atiq District, and Yazdanabad-e Sofla was transferred to Yazdan Rural District created in the new district.
