= Gozalabad =

Village in Razavi Khorasan province, Iran

Gozalabad Persian: گزل اباد
- Village
- Location within Iran
- Coordinates: 37°07′58″N 58°12′53″E
- Country: Iran
- Province: Razavi Khorasan
- County: Quchan
- District: Quchan Atiq
- Rural District: Yazdan

Population (2016)
  - Total: 455
- Time zone: UTC+3:30 (IRST)

Gozalabad (Persian: گزل اباد) (Note: Also romanized as Gozalābād) is a village in Yazdan Rural District of Quchan Atiq District in Quchan County, Razavi Khorasan province, Iran.

== Demographics ==
=== Population ===
At the time of the 2006 National Census, the village's population was 486 in 122 households, when it was in Quchan Atiq Rural District of the Central District. The following census in 2011 counted 426 people in 128 households. The 2016 census measured the population of the village as 455 people in 149 households.

In 2020, the rural district was separated from the district in the establishment of Quchan Atiq District, and Gozalabad was transferred to Yazdan Rural District created in the new district.
