= Orteh Cheshmeh =

Village in Razavi Khorasan province, Iran

Orteh Cheshmeh Persian: ارته چشمه
- Village
- Location within Iran
- Coordinates: 37°03′27″N 58°20′40″E
- Country: Iran
- Province: Razavi Khorasan
- County: Quchan
- District: Quchan Atiq
- Rural District: Yazdan

Population (2016)
  - Total: 419
- Time zone: UTC+3:30 (IRST)

Orteh Cheshmeh (Persian: ارته چشمه) (Note: Also romanized as Ūrteh Cheshmeh) is a village in Yazdan Rural District of Quchan Atiq District in Quchan County, Razavi Khorasan province, Iran.

== Demographics ==
=== Population ===
At the time of the 2006 National Census, the village's population was 461 in 120 households, when it was in Quchan Atiq Rural District of the Central District. The following census in 2011 counted 415 people in 124 households. The 2016 census measured the population of the village as 419 people in 132 households.

In 2020, the rural district was separated from the district in the establishment of Quchan Atiq District, and Orteh Cheshmeh was transferred to Yazdan Rural District created in the new district.
