= Mahmudi, Razavi Khorasan =

Village in Razavi Khorasan province, Iran

Mahmudi Persian: محمودي
- Village
- Location within Iran
- Coordinates: 37°06′26″N 58°16′27″E
- Country: Iran
- Province: Razavi Khorasan
- County: Quchan
- District: Quchan Atiq
- Rural District: Yazdan

Population (2016)
  - Total: 402
- Time zone: UTC+3:30 (IRST)

Mahmudi (Persian: محمودي) (Note: Also romanized as Maḩmūdī) is a village in Yazdan Rural District of Quchan Atiq District in Quchan County, Razavi Khorasan province, Iran.

== Demographics ==
=== Population ===
At the time of the 2006 National Census, the village's population was 579 in 155 households, when it was in Quchan Atiq Rural District of the Central District. The following census in 2011 counted 507 people in 154 households. The 2016 census measured the population of the village as 402 people in 134 households.

In 2020, the rural district was separated from the district in the establishment of Quchan Atiq District, and Mahmudi was transferred to Yazdan Rural District created in the new district.
