= Borj-e Zeydanlu =

Village in Razavi Khorasan province, Iran

Borj-e Zeydanlu Persian: برج زيدانلو
- Village
- Location within Iran
- Coordinates: 37°12′09″N 58°21′01″E
- Country: Iran
- Province: Razavi Khorasan
- County: Quchan
- District: Quchan Atiq
- Rural District: Yazdan

Population (2016)
  - Total: 294
- Time zone: UTC+3:30 (IRST)

Borj-e Zeydanlu (Persian: برج زيدانلو) (Note: Also romanized as Borj-e Zeydānlū; also known as Borj and Zeydānlū) is a village in Yazdan Rural District of Quchan Atiq District in Quchan County, Razavi Khorasan province, Iran.

== Demographics ==
=== Population ===
At the time of the 2006 National Census, the village's population was 442 in 114 households, when it was in Quchan Atiq Rural District of the Central District. The following census in 2011 counted 316 people in 92 households. The 2016 census measured the population of the village as 294 people in 92 households.

In 2020, the rural district was separated from the district in the establishment of Quchan Atiq District, and Borj-e Zeydanlu was transferred to Yazdan Rural District created in the new district.
