= Jafarabad-e Bala =

Jafarabad-e Bala (Persian: جعفرابادبالا) may refer to:

- Jafarabad-e Bala, Fars
- Jafarabad-e Bala, Hamadan
