= Yusefabad, Quchan =

Village in Razavi Khorasan province, Iran

Yusefabad Persian: يوسف اباد
- Village
- Location within Iran
- Coordinates: 37°09′13″N 58°20′54″E
- Country: Iran
- Province: Razavi Khorasan
- County: Quchan
- District: Quchan Atiq
- Rural District: Yazdan

Population (2016)
  - Total: 714
- Time zone: UTC+3:30 (IRST)

Yusefabad (Persian: يوسف اباد) (Note: Also romanized as Yūsefābād and Yūsofābād) is a village in Yazdan Rural District of Quchan Atiq District in Quchan County, Razavi Khorasan province, Iran.

== Demographics ==
=== Population ===
At the time of the 2006 National Census, the village's population was 935 in 230 households, when it was in Quchan Atiq Rural District of the Central District. The following census in 2011 counted 758 people in 234 households. The 2016 census measured the population of the village as 714 people in 217 households.

In 2020, the rural district was separated from the district in the establishment of Quchan Atiq District, and Yusefabad was transferred to Yazdan Rural District created in the new district.
