= Otorabad =

Village in Razavi Khorasan province, Iran

Otorabad Persian: اتراباد
- Village
- Location within Iran
- Coordinates: 37°10′34″N 58°21′18″E
- Country: Iran
- Province: Razavi Khorasan
- County: Quchan
- District: Quchan Atiq
- Rural District: Yazdan

Population (2016)
  - Total: 527
- Time zone: UTC+3:30 (IRST)

Otorabad (Persian: اتراباد) (Note: Also romanized as Otorābād and Otrābād) is a village in Yazdan Rural District of Quchan Atiq District in Quchan County, Razavi Khorasan province, Iran.

== Demographics ==
=== Population ===
At the time of the 2006 National Census, the village's population was 623 in 179 households, when it was in Quchan Atiq Rural District of the Central District. The following census in 2011 counted 482 people in 148 households. The 2016 census measured the population of the village as 527 people in 196 households.

In 2020, the rural district was separated from the district in the establishment of Quchan Atiq District, and Otorabad was transferred to Yazdan Rural District created in the new district.
