= Taqiabad, Quchan Atiq =

Village in Razavi Khorasan province, Iran

Taqiabad Persian: تقي اباد
- Village
- Location within Iran
- Coordinates: 37°07′58″N 58°16′45″E
- Country: Iran
- Province: Razavi Khorasan
- County: Quchan
- District: Quchan Atiq
- Rural District: Yazdan

Population (2016)
  - Total: 132
- Time zone: UTC+3:30 (IRST)

Taqiabad (Persian: تقی‌آباد) (Note: Also romanized as Taqīābād) is a village in Yazdan Rural District of Quchan Atiq District in Quchan County, Razavi Khorasan province, Iran.

== Demographics ==
=== Population ===
At the time of the 2006 National Census, the village's population was 220 in 56 households, when it was in Quchan Atiq Rural District of the Central District. The following census in 2011 counted 182 people in 54 households. The 2016 census measured the population of the village as 132 people in 38 households.

In 2020, the rural district was separated from the district in the establishment of Quchan Atiq District, and Taqiabad was transferred to Yazdan Rural District created in the new district.
