= Salimabad, Razavi Khorasan =

Village in Razavi Khorasan province, Iran

Salimabad Persian: سليم اباد
- Village
- Location within Iran
- Coordinates: 37°03′12″N 58°18′13″E
- Country: Iran
- Province: Razavi Khorasan
- County: Quchan
- District: Quchan Atiq
- Rural District: Yazdan

Population (2016)
  - Total: 162
- Time zone: UTC+3:30 (IRST)

Salimabad (Persian: سليم اباد) (Note: Also romanized as Salīmābād) is a village in Yazdan Rural District of Quchan Atiq District in Quchan County, Razavi Khorasan province, Iran.

== Demographics ==
=== Population ===
At the time of the 2006 National Census, the village's population was 192 in 53 households, when it was in Quchan Atiq Rural District of the Central District. The following census in 2011 counted 178 people in 52 households. The 2016 census measured the population of the village as 162 people in 49 households.

In 2020, the rural district was separated from the district in the establishment of Quchan Atiq District, and Salimabad was transferred to Yazdan Rural District created in the new district.
