= Firuzabad, Quchan =

Village in Razavi Khorasan province, Iran

Firuzabad Persian: فيروزاباد
- Village
- Location within Iran
- Coordinates: 37°07′26″N 58°22′29″E
- Country: Iran
- Province: Razavi Khorasan
- County: Quchan
- District: Quchan Atiq
- Rural District: Yazdan

Population (2016)
  - Total: 432
- Time zone: UTC+3:30 (IRST)

Firuzabad (Persian: فيروزاباد) (Note: Also romanized as Fīrūzābād; also known as Kalāteh-ye Fīrūzābād) is a village in Yazdan Rural District of Quchan Atiq District in Quchan County, Razavi Khorasan province, Iran.

== Demographics ==
=== Population ===
At the time of the 2006 National Census, the village's population was 684 in 160 households, when it was in Quchan Atiq Rural District of the Central District. The following census in 2011 counted 580 people in 166 households. The 2016 census measured the population of the village as 432 people in 152 households.

In 2020, the rural district was separated from the district in the establishment of Quchan Atiq District, and Firuzabad was transferred to Yazdan Rural District created in the new district.
