= Biglar, Razavi Khorasan =

Village in Razavi Khorasan province, Iran

Biglar Persian: بيگلر
- Village
- Location within Iran
- Coordinates: 37°03′54″N 58°18′22″E
- Country: Iran
- Province: Razavi Khorasan
- County: Quchan
- District: Quchan Atiq
- Rural District: Yazdan

Population (2016)
  - Total: 421
- Time zone: UTC+3:30 (IRST)

Biglar (Persian: بيگلر) (Note: Also romanized as Bīglar; also known as Beglar) is a village in Yazdan Rural District of Quchan Atiq District in Quchan County, Razavi Khorasan province, Iran.

== Demographics ==
=== Population ===
At the time of the 2006 National Census, the village's population was 525 in 129 households, when it was in Quchan Atiq Rural District of the Central District. The following census in 2011 counted 535 people in 156 households. The 2016 census measured the population of the village as 421 people in 128 households.

In 2020, the rural district was separated from the district in the establishment of Quchan Atiq District, and Biglar was transferred to Yazdan Rural District created in the new district.
