= Cəfərabad =

Cəfərabad or Jafarabad may refer to:

- Cəfərabad, Jabrayil, Azerbaijan
- Cəfərabad, Shaki, Azerbaijan
- Aşağı Fərəcan, Azerbaijan
