= Daghian =

Village in Razavi Khorasan province, Iran

Daghian Persian: داغيان
- Village
- Location within Iran
- Coordinates: 37°08′28″N 58°13′24″E
- Country: Iran
- Province: Razavi Khorasan
- County: Quchan
- District: Quchan Atiq
- Rural District: Yazdan

Population (2016)
  - Total: 993
- Time zone: UTC+3:30 (IRST)

Daghian (Persian: داغيان) (Note: Also romanized as Dagheyān, Dāghīān, and Dāghīyān) is a village in Yazdan Rural District of Quchan Atiq District in Quchan County, Razavi Khorasan province, Iran.

== Demographics ==
=== Population ===
At the time of the 2006 National Census, the village's population was 1,267 in 304 households, when it was in Quchan Atiq Rural District of the Central District. The following census in 2011 counted 1,157 people in 326 households. The 2016 census measured the population of the village as 993 people in 301 households.

In 2020, the rural district was separated from the district in the establishment of Quchan Atiq District, and Daghian was transferred to Yazdan Rural District created in the new district.
