= Saadat Qoli =

Saadat Qoli (Persian: سعادت قلي) may refer to:

- Saadat Qoli-ye Olya
- Saadat Qoli-ye Sofla
