= Darbandi, Razavi Khorasan =

Village in Razavi Khorasan province, Iran

Darbandi Persian: دربندي
- Village
- Location within Iran
- Coordinates: 37°05′02″N 58°20′46″E
- Country: Iran
- Province: Razavi Khorasan
- County: Quchan
- District: Quchan Atiq
- Rural District: Yazdan

Population (2016)
  - Total: 111
- Time zone: UTC+3:30 (IRST)

Darbandi (Persian: دربندي) (Note: Also romanized as Darbandī) is a village in Yazdan Rural District of Quchan Atiq District in Quchan County, Razavi Khorasan province, Iran.

== Demographics ==
=== Population ===
At the time of the 2006 National Census, the village's population was 126 in 27 households, when it was in Quchan Atiq Rural District of the Central District. The following census in 2011 counted 123 people in 33 households. The 2016 census measured the population of the village as 111 people in 33 households.

In 2020, the rural district was separated from the district in the establishment of Quchan Atiq District, and Darbandi was transferred to Yazdan Rural District created in the new district.
