= Kalateh-ye Mirza Rajab =

Village in Razavi Khorasan province, Iran

Kalateh-ye Mirza Rajab Persian: كلاته ميرزارجب
- Village
- Location within Iran
- Coordinates: 37°07′24″N 58°16′16″E
- Country: Iran
- Province: Razavi Khorasan
- County: Quchan
- District: Quchan Atiq
- Rural District: Yazdan

Population (2016)
  - Total: 298
- Time zone: UTC+3:30 (IRST)

Kalateh-ye Mirza Rajab (Persian: كلاته ميرزارجب) (Note: Also romanized as Kalāteh-ye Mīrzā Rajab) is a village in Yazdan Rural District of Quchan Atiq District in Quchan County, Razavi Khorasan province, Iran.

== Demographics ==
=== Population ===
At the time of the 2006 National Census, the village's population was 439 in 105 households, when it was in Quchan Atiq Rural District of the Central District. The following census in 2011 counted 339 people in 95 households. The 2016 census measured the population of the village as 298 people in 97 households.

In 2020, the rural district was separated from the district in the establishment of Quchan Atiq District, and Kalateh-ye Mirza Rajab was transferred to Yazdan Rural District created in the new district.
