= Kolukhi =

Kolukhi (Persian: كلوخي) may refer to:

- Kolukhi, Mashhad, Razavi Khorasan Province
- Kolukhi, Quchan, Razavi Khorasan Province
- Kolukhi, Sistan and Baluchestan
