= Hasanabad, Quchan =

Village in Razavi Khorasan province, Iran

Hasanabad Persian: حسن اباد
- Village
- Location within Iran
- Coordinates: 37°09′09″N 58°18′57″E
- Country: Iran
- Province: Razavi Khorasan
- County: Quchan
- District: Quchan Atiq
- Rural District: Yazdan

Population (2016)
  - Total: 437
- Time zone: UTC+3:30 (IRST)

Hasanabad (Persian: حسن اباد) (Note: Also romanized as Ḩasanābād) is a village in Yazdan Rural District of Quchan Atiq District in Quchan County, Razavi Khorasan province, Iran.

== Demographics ==
=== Population ===
At the time of the 2006 National Census, the village's population was 598 in 176 households, when it was in Quchan Atiq Rural District of the Central District. The following census in 2011 counted 552 people in 178 households. The 2016 census measured the population of the village as 437 people in 136 households.

In 2020, the rural district was separated from the district in the establishment of Quchan Atiq District, and Hasanabad was transferred to Yazdan Rural District created in the new district.
