= Qarah Shahverdi =

Village in Razavi Khorasan province, Iran

Qarah Shahverdi Persian: قره شاهوردي
- Village
- Location within Iran
- Coordinates: 37°02′11″N 58°19′00″E
- Country: Iran
- Province: Razavi Khorasan
- County: Quchan
- District: Quchan Atiq
- Rural District: Yazdan

Population (2016)
  - Total: 558
- Time zone: UTC+3:30 (IRST)

Qarah Shahverdi (Persian: قره شاهوردي) (Note: Also romanized as Qarah Shāhverdī; also known as Aḩmadābād (احمداباد)) is a village in Yazdan Rural District of Quchan Atiq District in Quchan County, Razavi Khorasan province, Iran.

== Demographics ==
=== Population ===
At the time of the 2006 National Census, the village's population was 802 in 180 households, when it was in Quchan Atiq Rural District of the Central District. The following census in 2011 counted 730 people in 195 households. The 2016 census measured the population of the village as 558 people in 161 households.

In 2020, the rural district was separated from the district in the establishment of Quchan Atiq District, and Qarah Shahverdi was transferred to Yazdan Rural District created in the new district.
