= Gonbad Heq =

Village in Razavi Khorasan province, Iran

Gonbad Heq Persian: گنبدحق
- Village
- Location within Iran
- Coordinates: 37°07′43″N 58°16′29″E
- Country: Iran
- Province: Razavi Khorasan
- County: Quchan
- District: Quchan Atiq
- Rural District: Yazdan

Population (2016)
  - Total: 322
- Time zone: UTC+3:30 (IRST)

Gonbad Heq (Persian: گنبدحق) (Note: Also known as Gonbad Jeq and Gonbadjoq) is a village in Yazdan Rural District of Quchan Atiq District in Quchan County, Razavi Khorasan province, Iran.

== Demographics ==
=== Population ===
At the time of the 2006 National Census, the village's population was 336 in 85 households, when it was in Quchan Atiq Rural District of the Central District. The following census in 2011 counted 275 people in 79 households. The 2016 census measured the population of the village as 322 people in 108 households.

In 2020, the rural district was separated from the district in the establishment of Quchan Atiq District, and Gonbad Heq was transferred to Yazdan Rural District created in the new district.
