= Zadak =

Village in Razavi Khorasan province, Iran

Zadak Persian: زادك
- Village
- Location within Iran
- Coordinates: 37°06′27″N 58°12′10″E
- Country: Iran
- Province: Razavi Khorasan
- County: Quchan
- District: Quchan Atiq
- Rural District: Yazdan

Population (2016)
  - Total: 65
- Time zone: UTC+3:30 (IRST)

Zadak (Persian: زادك) (Note: Also romanized as Zādak; also known as Azdak) is a village in Yazdan Rural District of Quchan Atiq District in Quchan County, Razavi Khorasan province, Iran.

== Demographics ==
=== Population ===
At the time of the 2006 National Census, the village's population was 83 in 26 households, when it was in Quchan Atiq Rural District of the Central District. The following census in 2011 counted 76 people in 24 households. The 2016 census measured the population of the village as 65 people in 21 households.

In 2020, the rural district was separated from the district in the establishment of Quchan Atiq District, and Zadak was transferred to Yazdan Rural District created in the new district.
