= Sarab, Quchan =

Village in Razavi Khorasan province, Iran

Sarab Persian: سراب
- Village
- Location within Iran
- Coordinates: 37°00′17″N 58°26′53″E
- Country: Iran
- Province: Razavi Khorasan
- County: Quchan
- District: Quchan Atiq
- Rural District: Quchan Atiq

Population (2016)
  - Total: 404
- Time zone: UTC+3:30 (IRST)

Sarab (Persian: سراب) (Note: Also romanized as Sarāb) is a village in Quchan Atiq Rural District of Quchan Atiq District in Quchan County, Razavi Khorasan province, Iran.

== Demographics ==
=== Population ===
At the time of the 2006 National Census, the village's population was 416 in 100 households, when it was in the Central District. The following census in 2011 counted 387 people in 109 households. The 2016 census measured the population of the village as 404 people in 118 households.

In 2020, the rural district was separated from the district in the formation of Quchan Atiq District.
