= Saadat Qoli-ye Olya =

Village in Razavi Khorasan province, Iran

Saadat Qoli-ye Olya Persian: سعادت قلي عليا
- Village
- Location within Iran
- Coordinates: 37°08′25″N 58°13′51″E
- Country: Iran
- Province: Razavi Khorasan
- County: Quchan
- District: Quchan Atiq
- Rural District: Yazdan

Population (2016)
  - Total: 108
- Time zone: UTC+3:30 (IRST)

Saadat Qoli-ye Olya (Persian: سعادت قلي عليا) (Note: Also romanized as Sa‘ādat Qolī-ye ‘Olyā; also known as Sa‘ādat Qolī Bālā and Sādāt Qolī-ye Bālā) is a village in Yazdan Rural District of Quchan Atiq District in Quchan County, Razavi Khorasan province, Iran.

== Demographics ==
=== Population ===
At the time of the 2006 National Census, the village's population was 104 in 22 households, when it was in Quchan Atiq Rural District of the Central District. The following census in 2011 counted 100 people in 28 households. The 2016 census measured the population of the village as 108 people in 31 households.

In 2020, the rural district was separated from the district in the establishment of Quchan Atiq District, and Saadat Qoli-ye Olya was transferred to Yazdan Rural District created in the new district.
