= Nasimabad, Razavi Khorasan =

Village in Razavi Khorasan province, Iran

Nasimabad Persian: نسيم اباد
- Village
- Location within Iran
- Coordinates: 37°05′06″N 58°29′40″E
- Country: Iran
- Province: Razavi Khorasan
- County: Quchan
- District: Quchan Atiq
- Rural District: Quchan Atiq

Population (2016)
  - Total: 1,517
- Time zone: UTC+3:30 (IRST)

Nasimabad (Persian: نسيم اباد) (Note: Also romanized as Nasīmābād) is a village in Quchan Atiq Rural District of Quchan Atiq District in Quchan County, Razavi Khorasan province, Iran.

== Demographics ==
=== Population ===
At the time of the 2006 National Census, the village's population was 1,114 in 270 households, when it was in the Central District. The following census in 2011 counted 1,487 people in 411 households. The 2016 census measured the population of the village as 1,517 people in 424 households.

In 2020, the rural district was separated from the district in the formation of Quchan Atiq District.
