= Khomartash =

Village in Razavi Khorasan province, Iran

Khomartash Persian: خمارتاش
- Village
- Location within Iran
- Coordinates: 37°12′56″N 58°26′05″E
- Country: Iran
- Province: Razavi Khorasan
- County: Quchan
- District: Quchan Atiq
- Rural District: Quchan Atiq

Population (2016)
  - Total: 868
- Time zone: UTC+3:30 (IRST)

Khomartash (Persian: خمارتاش) (Note: Also romanized as Khomārtāsh; also known as Khomār Tāj and Khomārtāj) is a village in Quchan Atiq Rural District of Quchan Atiq District in Quchan County, Razavi Khorasan province, Iran.

== Demographics ==
=== Population ===
At the time of the 2006 National Census, the village's population was 965 in 239 households, when it was in Shirin Darreh Rural District of the Central District. The following census in 2011 counted 933 people in 267 households. The 2016 census measured the population of the village as 868 people in 254 households.

In 2020, Khomartash was separated from the district in the formation of Quchan Atiq District and transferred to Quchan Atiq Rural District in the new district.
