= Moheb Saraj =

Village in Razavi Khorasan province, Iran

Moheb Saraj Persian: محب سراج
- Village
- Location within Iran
- Coordinates: 37°05′00″N 58°27′14″E
- Country: Iran
- Province: Razavi Khorasan
- County: Quchan
- District: Quchan Atiq
- Rural District: Quchan Atiq

Population (2016)
  - Total: 199
- Time zone: UTC+3:30 (IRST)

Moheb Saraj (Persian: محب سراج) (Note: Also romanized as Moḩeb Sarāj) is a village in Quchan Atiq Rural District of Quchan Atiq District in Quchan County, Razavi Khorasan province, Iran.

== Demographics ==
=== Population ===
At the time of the 2006 National Census, the village's population was 156 in 32 households, when it was in the Central District. The following census in 2011 counted 142 people in 33 households. The 2016 census measured the population of the village as 199 people in 60 households.

In 2020, the rural district was separated from the district in the formation of Quchan Atiq District.
