= Saman (name) =

Saman (Persian: سامان) is a Persian given name and surname, meaning "calm" and "solace.". Notable people with the name include:

== Given name ==
- Saman Aghazamani (born 1990), Iranian football midfielder
- Saman Arbabi (born 1973), Iranian-American journalist
- Saman Faezi (born 1991), Iranian volleyball player
- Saman Ghoddos (born 1993), Swedish football player of Iranian descent
- Saman Sultana Jaffri, Pakistani politician
- Saman Nariman Jahan (born 1991), Iranian football striker
- Saman Jayantha (born 1974), Sri Lankan cricketer
- Saman Khuda, Persian noble
- Saman Safa (born 1984), Iranian football player
- Saman Salur (born 1976), Iranian director and screenwriter
- Saman Sorjaturong (born 1969), Thai boxer
- Saman Tahmasebi (born 1985), Iranian-born Azerbaijani wrestler
- Saman Kunan (1980–2018), a Thai policeman who died trying to save children during the 2018 Thai cave rescue

== Surname ==
- Moises Saman (born 1974), Spanish-American photographer
- Saliya Saman (born 1985), Sri Lankan cricketer
