= Fakhrabad, Quchan =

Village in Razavi Khorasan province, Iran

Fakhrabad Persian: فخراباد
- Village
- Location within Iran
- Coordinates: 37°09′44″N 58°31′16″E
- Country: Iran
- Province: Razavi Khorasan
- County: Quchan
- District: Quchan Atiq
- Rural District: Quchan Atiq

Population (2016)
  - Total: 483
- Time zone: UTC+3:30 (IRST)

Fakhrabad (Persian: فخراباد) (Note: Also romanized as Fakhrābād; also known as Fatḩābād) is a village in Quchan Atiq Rural District of Quchan Atiq District in Quchan County, Razavi Khorasan province, Iran.

== Demographics ==
=== Population ===
At the time of the 2006 National Census, the village's population was 547 in 146 households, when it was in Shirin Darreh Rural District of the Central District. The following census in 2011 counted 490 people in 153 households. The 2016 census measured the population of the village as 483 people in 143 households.

In 2020, Fakhrabad was separated from the district in the formation of Quchan Atiq District and transferred to Quchan Atiq Rural District in the new district.
