= Alaqeh Janban =

Village in Razavi Khorasan province, Iran

Alaqeh Janban Persian: علاقه جنبان
- Village
- Location within Iran
- Coordinates: 37°00′04″N 58°29′20″E
- Country: Iran
- Province: Razavi Khorasan
- County: Quchan
- District: Quchan Atiq
- Rural District: Quchan Atiq

Population (2016)
  - Total: 218
- Time zone: UTC+3:30 (IRST)

Alaqeh Janban (Persian: علاقه جنبان) (Note: Also romanized as ʿAlāqeh Janbān) is a village in Quchan Atiq Rural District of Quchan Atiq District in Quchan County, Razavi Khorasan province, Iran.

== Demographics ==
=== Population ===
At the time of the 2006 National Census, the village's population was 212 in 47 households, when it was in Sudlaneh Rural District of the Central District. The following census in 2011 counted 184 people in 41 households. The 2016 census measured the population of the village as 218 people in 58 households.

In 2020, Alaqeh Janban was separated from the district in the formation of Quchan Atiq District and transferred to Quchan Atiq Rural District in the new district.
