= Jifar =

Jifar may refer to:

- Jifar (name), Ethiopian variant of the name Jafar
- Jifar (village), settlement near Muscat, Oman
- Jifar, a division (along with Jebel et-Tih) of the caliphate Syria Province in Palestine (region), in the area of the former Roman province of Palaestina Salutaris

== See also ==
- Jafar (disambiguation)
