= Salanquch =

Village in Razavi Khorasan province, Iran

Salanquch Persian: سالانقوچ
- Village
- Location within Iran
- Coordinates: 37°14′35″N 58°25′41″E
- Country: Iran
- Province: Razavi Khorasan
- County: Quchan
- District: Quchan Atiq
- Rural District: Quchan Atiq

Population (2016)
  - Total: 228
- Time zone: UTC+3:30 (IRST)

Salanquch (Persian: سالانقوچ) (Note: Also romanized as Sālānqūch; also known as Sālān Gūch and Sālānfūj) is a village in Quchan Atiq Rural District of Quchan Atiq District in Quchan County, Razavi Khorasan province, Iran.

== Demographics ==
=== Population ===
At the time of the 2006 National Census, the village's population was 337 in 81 households, when it was in Shirin Darreh Rural District of the Central District. The following census in 2011 counted 270 people in 81 households. The 2016 census measured the population of the village as 228 people in 82 households.

In 2020, Salanquch was separated from the district in the formation of Quchan Atiq District and transferred to Quchan Atiq Rural District in the new district.
