= Shurak-e Tupkanlu =

Village in Razavi Khorasan province, Iran

Shurak-e Tupkanlu Persian: شورك توپكانلو
- Village
- Location within Iran
- Coordinates: 37°09′51″N 58°30′18″E
- Country: Iran
- Province: Razavi Khorasan
- County: Quchan
- District: Quchan Atiq
- Rural District: Quchan Atiq

Population (2016)
  - Total: 411
- Time zone: UTC+3:30 (IRST)

Shurak-e Tupkanlu (Persian: شورك توپكانلو) (Note: Also romanized as Shūrak-e Tūpkānlū, Shurok-e Tupkanlu, and Shūrok-e Tūpkānlū) is a village in Quchan Atiq Rural District of Quchan Atiq District in Quchan County, Razavi Khorasan province, Iran.

== Demographics ==
=== Population ===
At the time of the 2006 National Census, the village's population was 478 in 120 households, when it was in Shirin Darreh Rural District of the Central District. The following census in 2011 counted 441 people in 134 households. The 2016 census measured the population of the village as 411 people in 138 households.

In 2020, Shurak-e Tupkanlu was separated from the district in the formation of Quchan Atiq District and transferred to Quchan Atiq Rural District in the new district.
