= Kohneh Forud =

Village in Razavi Khorasan province, Iran

Kohneh Forud Persian: كهنه فرود
- Village
- Location within Iran
- Coordinates: 37°02′24″N 58°28′37″E
- Country: Iran
- Province: Razavi Khorasan
- County: Quchan
- District: Quchan Atiq
- Rural District: Quchan Atiq

Population (2016)
  - Total: 1,671
- Time zone: UTC+3:30 (IRST)

Kohneh Forud (Persian: كهنه فرود) (Note: Also romanized as Kohneh Forūd) is a village in Quchan Atiq Rural District of Quchan Atiq District in Quchan County, Razavi Khorasan province, Iran.

== Demographics ==
=== Population ===
At the time of the 2006 National Census, the village's population was 1,823 in 420 households, when it was in the Central District. The following census in 2011 counted 1,879 people in 516 households. The 2016 census measured the population of the village as 1,671 people in 467 households.

In 2020, the rural district was separated from the district in the formation of Quchan Atiq District.
