= Yazdan Rural District =

Rural district in Razavi Khorasan province, Iran

Yazdan Rural District Persian: دهستان یزدان
- Rural District
- Location within Iran
- Coordinates: 37°07′N 58°17′E
- Country: Iran
- Province: Razavi Khorasan
- County: Quchan
- District: Quchan Atiq
- Established: 2020
- Capital: Yazdanabad-e Sofla
- Time zone: UTC+3:30 (IRST)

Yazdan Rural District (Persian: دهستان یزدان) is in Quchan Atiq District of Quchan County, Razavi Khorasan province, Iran. Its capital is the village of Yazdanabad-e Sofla, whose population at the time of the 2016 National Census was 802 in 269 households.

== History ==
In 2020, Quchan Atiq Rural District was separated from the Central District in the formation of Quchan Atiq District, and Yazdan Rural District was created in the new district.

== Other villages in the rural district ==
- Biglar
- Borj-e Zeydanlu
- Chitgar
- Daghian
- Darbandi
- Firuzabad
- Gonbad Heq
- Gozalabad
- Hajji Kahu
- Hasanabad
- Jafarabad-e Olya
- Jartudeh
- Kalateh-ye Mirza Rajab
- Mahmudi
- Orteh Cheshmeh
- Otorabad
- Qarah Shahverdi
- Saadat Qoli-ye Olya
- Saadat Qoli-ye Sofla
- Salimabad
- Taqiabad
- Yusefabad
- Zadak
