= Fathabad, Quchan =

Village in Razavi Khorasan province, Iran

Fathabad Persian: فتح اباد
- Village
- Location within Iran
- Coordinates: 37°07′24″N 58°27′18″E
- Country: Iran
- Province: Razavi Khorasan
- County: Quchan
- District: Quchan Atiq
- Rural District: Quchan Atiq

Population (2016)
  - Total: 382
- Time zone: UTC+3:30 (IRST)

Fathabad (Persian: فتح اباد) (Note: Also romanized as Fatḩābād) is a village in Quchan Atiq Rural District of Quchan Atiq District in Quchan County, Razavi Khorasan province, Iran.

== Demographics ==
=== Population ===
At the time of the 2006 National Census, the village's population was 342 in 90 households, when it was in the Central District. The following census in 2011 counted 366 people in 99 households. The 2016 census measured the population of the village as 382 people in 113 households.

In 2020, the rural district was separated from the district in the formation of Quchan Atiq District.
