= Mohammadabad-e Sofla, Razavi Khorasan =

Village in Razavi Khorasan province, Iran

Mohammadabad-e Sofla Persian: محمدابادسفلي
- Village
- Location within Iran
- Coordinates: 37°07′22″N 58°25′49″E
- Country: Iran
- Province: Razavi Khorasan
- County: Quchan
- District: Quchan Atiq
- Rural District: Quchan Atiq

Population (2016)
  - Total: 179
- Time zone: UTC+3:30 (IRST)

Mohammadabad-e Sofla (Persian: محمدابادسفلي) (Note: Also romanized as Moḩammadābād-e Soflá; also known as Moḩammadābād, Muhammadābād, and Nownamadābād) is a village in Quchan Atiq Rural District of Quchan Atiq District in Quchan County, Razavi Khorasan province, Iran.

== Demographics ==
=== Population ===
At the time of the 2006 National Census, the village's population was 184 in 43 households, when it was in the Central District. The following census in 2011 counted 199 people in 48 households. The 2016 census measured the population of the village as 179 people in 51 households.

In 2020, the rural district was separated from the district in the formation of Quchan Atiq District.
