= Zubaran =

Village in Razavi Khorasan province, Iran

Zubaran Persian: زوباران
- Village
- Location within Iran
- Coordinates: 37°12′53″N 58°28′38″E
- Country: Iran
- Province: Razavi Khorasan
- County: Quchan
- District: Quchan Atiq
- Rural District: Quchan Atiq

Population (2016)
  - Total: 219
- Time zone: UTC+3:30 (IRST)

Zubaran (Persian: زوباران) (Note: Also romanized as Zowbārān and Zūbārān) is a village in Quchan Atiq Rural District of Quchan Atiq District in Quchan County, Razavi Khorasan province, Iran.

== Demographics ==
=== Population ===
At the time of the 2006 National Census, the village's population was 331 in 79 households, when it was in Shirin Darreh Rural District of the Central District. The following census in 2011 counted 240 people in 68 households. The 2016 census measured the population of the village as 219 people in 70 households.

In 2020, Zubaran was separated from the district in the formation of Quchan Atiq District and transferred to Quchan Atiq Rural District in the new district.
