= Gowjeh =

Village in Razavi Khorasan province, Iran

Gowjeh Persian: گوجه
- Village
- Location within Iran
- Coordinates: 37°04′44″N 58°26′32″E
- Country: Iran
- Province: Razavi Khorasan
- County: Quchan
- District: Quchan Atiq
- Rural District: Quchan Atiq

Population (2016)
  - Total: 641
- Time zone: UTC+3:30 (IRST)

Gowjeh (Persian: گوجه) is a village in Quchan Atiq Rural District of Quchan Atiq District in Quchan County, Razavi Khorasan province, Iran.

== Demographics ==
=== Population ===
At the time of the 2006 National Census, the village's population was 697 in 169 households, when it was in the Central District. The following census in 2011 counted 698 people in 183 households. The 2016 census measured the population of the village as 641 people in 195 households.

In 2020, the rural district was separated from the district in the formation of Quchan Atiq District.
