= List of botanical gardens in Iran =

Botanical gardens in Iran have collections consisting entirely of Iran native and endemic species.

- Eram Botanical Garden, Shiraz
- National Botanical Garden of Iran, Chitgar area, Tehran
