= Askariyeh, Razavi Khorasan =

Village in Razavi Khorasan province, Iran

Askariyeh Persian: عسكريه
- Village
- Country: Iran
- Province: Razavi Khorasan
- County: Quchan
- District: Quchan Atiq
- Rural District: Quchan Atiq

Population (2016)
  - Total: 70
- Time zone: UTC+3:30 (IRST)

Askariyeh (Persian: عسكريه) (Note: Also romanized as ʿAsḵarīyeh; also known as Noşratābād (نصرت اباد)) is a village in Quchan Atiq Rural District of Quchan Atiq District in Quchan County, Razavi Khorasan province, Iran.

== Demographics ==
=== Population ===
At the time of the 2006 National Census, the village's population was 58 in 14 households, when it was in the Central District. The following census in 2011 counted 62 people in 17 households. The 2016 census measured the population of the village as 70 people in 20 households.

In 2020, the rural district was separated from the district in the formation of Quchan Atiq District.
