= Yazdanabad-e Olya =

Village in Razavi Khorasan province, Iran

Yazdanabad-e Olya Persian: يزدان ابادعليا
- Village
- Location within Iran
- Coordinates: 37°03′37″N 58°24′06″E
- Country: Iran
- Province: Razavi Khorasan
- County: Quchan
- District: Quchan Atiq
- Rural District: Quchan Atiq

Population (2016)
  - Total: 172
- Time zone: UTC+3:30 (IRST)

Yazdanabad-e Olya (Persian: يزدان ابادعليا) (Note: Also romanized as Yazdānābād-e ‘Olyā; also known as Yazdānābād and Yazdānābād-e Bālā) is a village in Quchan Atiq Rural District of Quchan Atiq District in Quchan County, Razavi Khorasan province, Iran.

== Demographics ==
=== Population ===
At the time of the 2006 National Census, the village's population was 214 in 42 households, when it was in the Central District. The following census in 2011 counted 193 people in 46 households. The 2016 census measured the population of the village as 172 people in 43 households.

In 2020, the rural district was separated from the district in the formation of Quchan Atiq District.
