= Mohammadabad-e Olya, Razavi Khorasan =

Village in Razavi Khorasan province, Iran

Mohammadabad-e Olya Persian: محمدابادعليا
- Village
- Location within Iran
- Coordinates: 37°07′46″N 58°24′02″E
- Country: Iran
- Province: Razavi Khorasan
- County: Quchan
- District: Quchan Atiq
- Rural District: Quchan Atiq

Population (2016)
  - Total: 148
- Time zone: UTC+3:30 (IRST)

Mohammadabad-e Olya (Persian: محمدابادعليا) (Note: Also romanized as Moḩammadābād-e ‘Olyā; also known as Moḩammadābād) is a village in Quchan Atiq Rural District of Quchan Atiq District in Quchan County, Razavi Khorasan province, Iran.

== Demographics ==
=== Population ===
At the time of the 2006 National Census, the village's population was 157 in 36 households, when it was in the Central District. The following census in 2011 counted 135 people in 35 households. The 2016 census measured the population of the village as 148 people in 46 households.

In 2020, the rural district was separated from the district in the formation of Quchan Atiq District.
