= Vanu =

Vanu may refer to:

== People ==
- Nigel Vanu (born 1989), Singaporean football player
- Vanu Bose (1965–2017), American electrical engineer and technology executive
- Vanu Gopala Menon (born 1960), Singaporean politician

== Places ==
- Vanu, Iran

== Other ==
- Vanu Sovereignty, a faction in the PlanetSide video game series
- Vojvodina Academy of Sciences and Arts
