= Saadat Qoli-ye Sofla =

Village in Razavi Khorasan province, Iran

Saadat Qoli-ye Sofla Persian: سعادت قلي سفلي
- Village
- Location within Iran
- Coordinates: 37°08′37″N 58°13′58″E
- Country: Iran
- Province: Razavi Khorasan
- County: Quchan
- District: Quchan Atiq
- Rural District: Yazdan

Population (2016)
  - Total: 119
- Time zone: UTC+3:30 (IRST)

Saadat Qoli-ye Sofla (Persian: سعادت قلي سفلي) (Note: Also romanized as Sa‘ādat Qolī-ye Soflá; also known as Qal‘eh Sādāt Qolī Pā’īn and Sa‘ādat Qolī-ye Pā’īn) is a village in Yazdan Rural District of Quchan Atiq District in Quchan County, Razavi Khorasan province, Iran.

== Demographics ==
=== Population ===
At the time of the 2006 National Census, the village's population was 151 in 37 households, when it was in Quchan Atiq Rural District of the Central District. The following census in 2011 counted 117 people in 33 households. The 2016 census measured the population of the village as 119 people in 34 households.

In 2020, the rural district was separated from the district in the establishment of Quchan Atiq District, and Saadat Qoli-ye Sofla was transferred to Yazdan Rural District created in the new district.
