= Nowruzi, Quchan =

Village in Razavi Khorasan province, Iran

Nowruzi Persian: نوروزي
- Village
- Location within Iran
- Coordinates: 37°03′09″N 58°25′24″E
- Country: Iran
- Province: Razavi Khorasan
- County: Quchan
- District: Quchan Atiq
- Rural District: Quchan Atiq

Population (2016)
  - Total: 532
- Time zone: UTC+3:30 (IRST)

Nowruzi (Persian: نوروزي) (Note: Also romanized as Nowrūzī; also known as Kalāteh-ye Nowrūzī and Naurūzi) is a village in Quchan Atiq Rural District of Quchan Atiq District in Quchan County, Razavi Khorasan province, Iran.

== Demographics ==
=== Population ===
At the time of the 2006 National Census, the village's population was 573 in 139 households, when it was in the Central District. The following census in 2011 counted 570 people in 160 households. The 2016 census measured the population of the village as 532 people in 159 households.

In 2020, the rural district was separated from the district in the formation of Quchan Atiq District.
