= Neyyat =

Village in Razavi Khorasan province, Iran

Neyyat Persian: نيت
- Village
- Location within Iran
- Coordinates: 37°04′09″N 58°22′50″E
- Country: Iran
- Province: Razavi Khorasan
- County: Quchan
- District: Quchan Atiq
- Rural District: Quchan Atiq

Population (2016)
  - Total: 383
- Time zone: UTC+3:30 (IRST)

Neyyat (Persian: نيت) (Note: Also known as Nayyat) is a village in Quchan Atiq Rural District of Quchan Atiq District in Quchan County, Razavi Khorasan province, Iran.

== Demographics ==
=== Population ===
At the time of the 2006 National Census, the village's population was 435 in 107 households, when it was in the Central District. The following census in 2011 counted 404 people in 120 households. The 2016 census measured the population of the village as 383 people in 121 households.

In 2020, the rural district was separated from the district in the formation of Quchan Atiq District.
