= Jaafari =

Ja'fari or Jaafari may refer to:

- Jaʽfari jurisprudence, the juridical school followed by Twelver and Nizari Shi'a, named after Ja'far al-Sadiq
- Al-Ja'fari, a surname commonly associated with descendants of Ja'far al-Sadiq, including notable people with the surname

== See also ==
- Ja'farids (disambiguation)
- Jafariyeh (disambiguation)
- Jafar (disambiguation)
- Ja'far al-Sadiq (702-765), holy sixth imam for the majority of Shia Muslims
- Jaʽfar, a given name common among Shia Muslims
- Twelver Shi’ism, the largest branch of Shia Islam
- Nizari Isma'ilism, the second largest branch of Shia Islam
