= Zeydanlu =

Village in Razavi Khorasan province, Iran

Zeydanlu Persian: زيدانلو
- Village
- Location within Iran
- Coordinates: 37°12′24″N 58°22′30″E
- Country: Iran
- Province: Razavi Khorasan
- County: Quchan
- District: Quchan Atiq
- Rural District: Quchan Atiq

Population (2016)
  - Total: 745
- Time zone: UTC+3:30 (IRST)

Zeydanlu (Persian: زيدانلو) (Note: Also romanized as Zeydānlū) is a village in Quchan Atiq Rural District of Quchan Atiq District in Quchan County, Razavi Khorasan province, Iran.

== Demographics ==
=== Population ===
At the time of the 2006 National Census, the village's population was 900 in 245 households, when it was in the Central District. The following census in 2011 counted 810 people in 256 households. The 2016 census measured the population of the village as 745 people in 236 households.

In 2020, the rural district was separated from the district in the formation of Quchan Atiq District.
