= Joneydabad =

Village in Razavi Khorasan province, Iran

Joneydabad Persian: جنيداباد
- Village
- Location within Iran
- Coordinates: 37°03′55″N 58°23′21″E
- Country: Iran
- Province: Razavi Khorasan
- County: Quchan
- District: Quchan Atiq
- Rural District: Quchan Atiq

Population (2016)
  - Total: 257
- Time zone: UTC+3:30 (IRST)

Joneydabad (Persian: جنيداباد) (Note: Also romanized as Joneydābād) is a village in Quchan Atiq Rural District of Quchan Atiq District in Quchan County, Razavi Khorasan province, Iran.

== Demographics ==
=== Population ===
At the time of the 2006 National Census, the village's population was 346 in 77 households, when it was in the Central District. The following census in 2011 counted 313 people in 91 households. The 2016 census measured the population of the village as 257 people in 80 households.

In 2020, the rural district was separated from the district in the formation of Quchan Atiq District.
