= Jafar (disambiguation) =

Ja'far is an Arabic given name and surname.

Ja'far or Jafar may also refer to:

== Places ==
- Jafar, Iran, a village in Kurdistan Province
- Joghghal-e Aviyeh, Khuzestan Province, Iran, also known as Jafār, a village
- Ja'far, Hadhramaut, Yemen, a village in the Hadhramaut Governorate

== Arts and entertainment ==
- "Jafar", a 2009 song from the Ares album by Salt the Wound
- Jafar (Aladdin), the main antagonist of Disney's Aladdin franchise
- Jaffar, the main antagonist, played by Conrad Veidt, of The Thief of Bagdad (1940), produced by Alexander Korda

== See also ==
- Jifar (disambiguation)
- Jaafari (disambiguation)
- Jafarabad (disambiguation)
