= Shurak-e Hajji =

Village in Razavi Khorasan province, Iran

Shurak-e Hajji Persian: شورك حاجي
- Village
- Location within Iran
- Coordinates: 37°10′32″N 58°29′15″E
- Country: Iran
- Province: Razavi Khorasan
- County: Quchan
- District: Quchan Atiq
- Rural District: Quchan Atiq

Population (2016)
  - Total: 482
- Time zone: UTC+3:30 (IRST)

Shurak-e Hajji (Persian: شورك حاجي) (Note: Also romanized as Shurak Haji, Shurak Hajji, Shūrak-e Ḩājī, Shūrak-e Hājjī, Shurok Haji, Shurok Hajji, Shūrok-e Ḩājī, and Shūrok-e Hājjī) is a village in Quchan Atiq Rural District of Quchan Atiq District in Quchan County, Razavi Khorasan province, Iran.

== Demographics ==
=== Population ===
At the time of the 2006 National Census, the village's population was 410 in 95 households, when it was in Shirin Darreh Rural District of the Central District. The following census in 2011 counted 392 people in 115 households. The 2016 census measured the population of the village as 482 people in 141 households.

In 2020, Shurak-e Hajji was separated from the district in the formation of Quchan Atiq District and transferred to Quchan Atiq Rural District in the new district.
