= Chitgar =

Village in Razavi Khorasan province, Iran

Chitgar Persian: چيتگر
- Village
- Location within Iran
- Coordinates: 37°06′55″N 58°16′43″E
- Country: Iran
- Province: Razavi Khorasan
- County: Quchan
- District: Quchan Atiq
- Rural District: Yazdan

Population (2016)
  - Total: 271
- Time zone: UTC+3:30 (IRST)

Chitgar (Persian: چيتگر) (Note: Also romanized as Chītgar) is a village in Yazdan Rural District of Quchan Atiq District in Quchan County, Razavi Khorasan province, Iran.

== Demographics ==
=== Population ===
At the time of the 2006 National Census, the village's population was 465 in 112 households, when it was in Quchan Atiq Rural District of the Central District. The following census in 2011 counted 395 people in 115 households. The 2016 census measured the population of the village as 271 people in 92 households.

In 2020, the rural district was separated from the district in the establishment of Quchan Atiq District, and Chitgar was transferred to Yazdan Rural District created in the new district.
