= Jafariyeh (disambiguation) =

Jafariyeh is a city in Qom Province, Iran.

Jafariyeh (Persian: جعفريه) may also refer to these places in Iran:

- Jafariyeh, Hamadan
- Jafariyeh, Razavi Khorasan
- Jafariyeh, South Khorasan
- Jafariyeh, Tehran

== See also ==
- Jaafari (disambiguation)
