= Jafarabad-e Olya, Quchan Atiq =

Village in Razavi Khorasan province, Iran

Jafarabad-e Olya Persian: جعفرابادعليا
- Village
- Location within Iran
- Coordinates: 37°10′24″N 58°17′40″E
- Country: Iran
- Province: Razavi Khorasan
- County: Quchan
- District: Quchan Atiq
- Rural District: Yazdan

Population (2016)
  - Total: 182
- Time zone: UTC+3:30 (IRST)

Jafarabad-e Olya (Persian: جعفرابادعليا) (Note: Also romanized as Ja‘farābād-e ‘Olyā; also known as Ja‘farābād) is a village in Yazdan Rural District of Quchan Atiq District in Quchan County, Razavi Khorasan province, Iran.

== Demographics ==
=== Population ===
At the time of the 2006 National Census, the village's population was 235 in 64 households, when it was in Quchan Atiq Rural District of the Central District. The following census in 2011 counted 216 people in 67 households. The 2016 census measured the population of the village as 182 people in 56 households.

In 2020, the rural district was separated from the district in the establishment of Quchan Atiq District, and Jafarabad-e Olya was transferred to Yazdan Rural District created in the new district.
