= Çolaxlı =

Cholagly
- Azerbaijani: Çolaqlı
- Location within Azerbaijan Location within Shaki-Zagatala Economic Region
- Coordinates: 41°02′N 47°12′E
- Country: Azerbaijan
- District: Shaki
- Municipality: Jafarabad
- Time zone: UTC+4 (AZT)
  - Summer (DST): UTC+5 (AZT)

Çolaqlı (also, Çolaxlı, Cholagly, and Cholakhly) is a village in the Shaki District of Azerbaijan. The village forms part of the municipality of Jafarabad.
