= Kolukhi, Quchan =

Village in Razavi Khorasan province, Iran

Kolukhi Persian: كلوخي
- Village
- Location within Iran
- Coordinates: 37°01′45″N 58°26′01″E
- Country: Iran
- Province: Razavi Khorasan
- County: Quchan
- District: Quchan Atiq
- Rural District: Quchan Atiq

Population (2016)
  - Total: 693
- Time zone: UTC+3:30 (IRST)

Kolukhi (Persian: كلوخي) (Note: Also romanized as Kolūkhī) is a village in Quchan Atiq Rural District of Quchan Atiq District in Quchan County, Razavi Khorasan province, Iran.

== Demographics ==
=== Population ===
At the time of the 2006 National Census, the village's population was 976 in 238 households, when it was in the Central District. The following census in 2011 counted 835 people in 245 households. The 2016 census measured the population of the village as 693 people in 213 households.

In 2020, the rural district was separated from the district in the formation of Quchan Atiq District.
