= Filab, Razavi Khorasan =

Village in Razavi Khorasan province, Iran

Filab Persian: فيلاب
- Village
- Location within Iran
- Coordinates: 37°08′16″N 58°25′35″E
- Country: Iran
- Province: Razavi Khorasan
- County: Quchan
- District: Quchan Atiq
- Rural District: Quchan Atiq

Population (2016)
  - Total: 199
- Time zone: UTC+3:30 (IRST)

Filab (Persian: فيلاب) (Note: Also romanized as Fīlāb) is a village in Quchan Atiq Rural District of Quchan Atiq District in Quchan County, Razavi Khorasan province, Iran.

== Demographics ==
=== Population ===
At the time of the 2006 National Census, the village's population was 344 in 103 households, when it was in the Central District. The following census in 2011 counted 297 people in 94 households. The 2016 census measured the population of the village as 199 people in 76 households.

In 2020, the rural district was separated from the district in the formation of Quchan Atiq District.

== Notable people ==
- Moslem Eskandar-Filabi, Olympic wrestler
