= Shahr-e Kohneh, Quchan =

City in Razavi Khorasan province, Iran

Shahr-e Kohneh Persian: شهر كهنه
- City
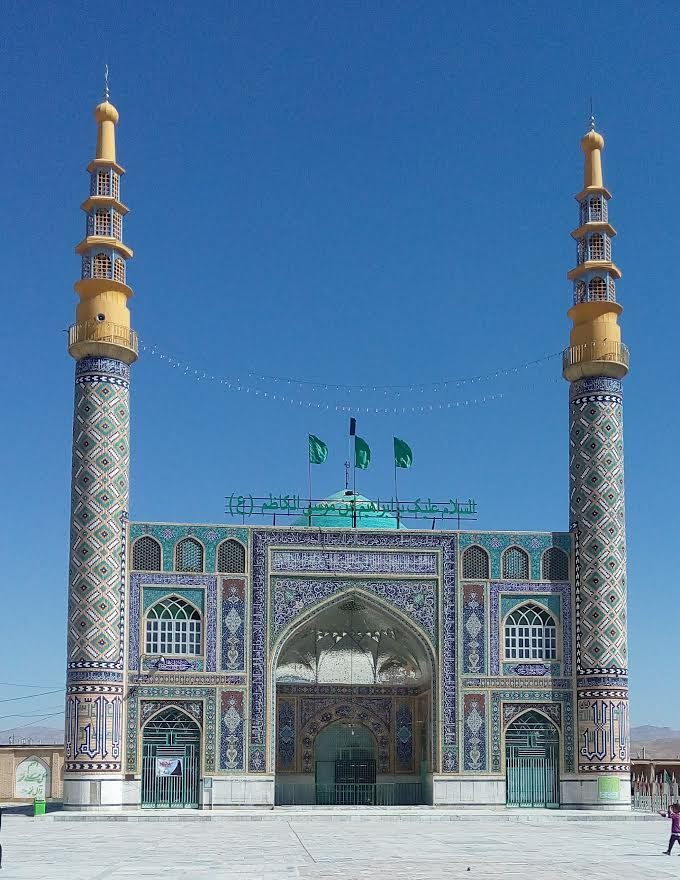
- Emamzadeh Soltan Ebrahim (the Shrine of Abraham) in Quchan

- Location within Iran
- Coordinates: 37°08′19″N 58°23′29″E
- Country: Iran
- Province: Razavi Khorasan
- County: Quchan
- District: Quchan Atiq
- Established as a city: 2021

Population (2016)
  - Total: 3,320
- Time zone: UTC+3:30 (IRST)

Shahr-e Kohneh (Persian: شهر كهنه) (Note: Also romanized as Shahr Kohneh; also known as Khabūshān) is a city in, and the capital of, Quchan Atiq District in Quchan County, Razavi Khorasan province, Iran. As a village, it was the capital of Quchan Atiq Rural District until its capital was transferred to the village of Asgharabad.

== Demographics ==
=== Population ===
At the time of the 2006 National Census, Shahr-e Kohneh's population was 3,683 in 930 households, when it was a village in Quchan Atiq Rural District of the Central District. The following census in 2011 counted 3,486 people in 980 households. The 2016 census measured the population of the village as 3,320 people in 1,062 households, the most populous in its rural district.

In 2020, the rural district was separated from the district in the formation of Quchan Atiq District, and Shahr-e Kohneh was converted to a city in 2021.
