= Ja'farids =

Ja'farids or Jafarids can refer to:

- the descendants of Ja'far ibn Abi Talib
- the second ruling dynasty (880–1080) of the Emirate of Tiflis
- the first ruling dynasty (c. 968–1061) of the Sharifate of Mecca

== See also ==
- Ja'fari school, legal school in Shia Islam
- Jaafari (disambiguation)
