= Ja'far, Hadhramaut =

Coordinates: 15.7528°N 48.3097°E

Ja`far
- Interactive map of Ja`far
- Country: Yemen
- Governorate: Hadhramaut
- Time zone: UTC+3 (Yemen Standard Time)

Ja`far is a village in eastern Yemen. It is located in the Hadhramaut Governorate.
