= Jaffarpur =

- Village
- Location in Punjab, India Jaffarpur (India)
- Coordinates: 31.0976576°N 76.1180557°E
- Country: India
- State: Punjab
- District: Shaheed Bhagat Singh Nagar

Government
  - Type: Panchayat raj
  - Body: Gram panchayat
- Elevation: 355 m (1,165 ft)

Population (2011)
  - Total: 895
- Sex ratio 457/438 ♂/♀

Languages
  - Official: Punjabi
- Time zone: UTC+5:30 (IST)
- PIN: 144516
- Telephone code: 01823
- ISO 3166 code: IN-PB
- Post office: Langroya
- Website: nawanshahr.nic.in

Jaffarpur is a village in Shaheed Bhagat Singh Nagar district of Punjab State, India. It is located 6.3 kilometres (3.9 mi) away from postal head office Langroya, 4 kilometres (2.5 mi) from Nawanshahr, 3.6 kilometres (2.2 mi) from district headquarter Shaheed Bhagat Singh Nagar and 94 kilometres (58 mi) from state capital Chandigarh. The village is administrated by Sarpanch an elected representative of the village.

== Demography ==
As of 2011, Jaffarpur has a total number of 188 houses and population of 895 of which 457 include are males while 438 are females according to the report published by Census India in 2011. The literacy rate of Jaffarpur is 80.50%, higher than the state average of 75.84%. The population of children under the age of 6 years is 95 which is 10.61% of total population of Jaffarpur, and child sex ratio is approximately 727 as compared to Punjab state average of 846.

Most of the people are from Schedule Caste which constitutes 42.23% of total population in Jaffarpur. The town does not have any Schedule Tribe population so far.

As per the report published by Census India in 2011, 365 people were engaged in work activities out of the total population of Jaffarpur which includes 290 males and 75 females. According to census survey report 2011, 91.23% workers describe their work as main work and 8.77% workers are involved in Marginal activity providing livelihood for less than 6 months.

== Education ==
The village has a Punjabi medium, co-ed primary school founded in 1978. The schools provide mid-day meal as per Indian Midday Meal Scheme. The school provide free education to children between the ages of 6 and 14 as per Right of Children to Free and Compulsory Education Act. KC Engineering College and Doaba Khalsa Trust Group Of Institutions are the nearest colleges. Industrial Training Institute for women (ITI Nawanshahr) is 5 kilometres (3.1 mi) and Lovely Professional University is 48 kilometres (30 mi) away from the village.

== Transport ==
Nawanshahr railway station is the nearest train station however, Garhshankar Junction railway station is 15 kilometres (9.3 mi) away from the village. Sahnewal Airport is 53 kilometres (33 mi) away from the village which is the nearest domestic airport located in Ludhiana and the nearest international airport is located in Chandigarh also Sri Guru Ram Dass Jee International Airport is the second nearest airport which is 157 kilometres (98 mi) away in Amritsar.

== See also ==
- List of villages in India
