= Jafarabad, Jiroft =

Jafarabad جعفراباد
- Village
- Location within Iran
- Coordinates: 28°41′48″N 57°01′22″E
- Country: Iran
- Province: Kerman
- County: Jiroft
- Bakhsh: Central
- Rural District: Esfandaqeh

Population (2006)
  - Total: 65
- Time zone: UTC+3:30 (IRST)
  - Summer (DST): UTC+4:30 (IRDT)

Jafarabad (Persian: جعفراباد, also Romanized as Ja‘farābād) is a village in Esfandaqeh Rural District, in the Central District of Jiroft County, Kerman Province, Iran. At the 2006 census, its population was 65, in 11 families.
