= Kolukhi, Mashhad =

Kolukhi كلوخي
- Village
- Location within Iran
- Coordinates: 36°36′05″N 59°29′07″E
- Country: Iran
- Province: Razavi Khorasan
- County: Mashhad
- Bakhsh: Central
- Rural District: Darzab

Population (2006)
  - Total: 140
- Time zone: UTC+3:30 (IRST)
  - Summer (DST): UTC+4:30 (IRDT)

Kolukhi (Persian: كلوخي, also Romanized as Kolūkhī) is a village in Darzab Rural District, in the Central District of Mashhad County, Razavi Khorasan Province, Iran. At the 2006 census, its population was 140, in 40 families.
