= Jafarabad, Sonqor =

Jafarabad جعفراباد
- Village
- Location within Iran
- Coordinates: 34°40′20″N 47°47′10″E
- Country: Iran
- Province: Kermanshah
- County: Sonqor
- Bakhsh: Central
- Rural District: Parsinah

Population (2006)
  - Total: 444
- Time zone: UTC+3:30 (IRST)
  - Summer (DST): UTC+4:30 (IRDT)

Jafarabad (Persian: جعفراباد, also Romanized as Ja‘farābād; also known as Ja‘farābād-e Chamcham) is a village in Parsinah Rural District, in the Central District of Sonqor County, Kermanshah Province, Iran. At the 2006 census, its population was 444, in 85 families.
