= Jafarabad, Sepidan =

Jafarabad جعفرآباد
- village
- Location within Iran
- Coordinates: 30°00′48″N 52°19′14″E
- Country: Iran
- Province: Fars
- County: Sepidan
- Bakhsh: Beyza
- Rural District: Beyza

Population (2006)
  - Total: 490
- Time zone: UTC+3:30 (IRST)
  - Summer (DST): UTC+4:30 (IRDT)

Jafarabad (Persian: جعفرآباد, also romanized as Ja‘farābād) is a village in Beyza Rural District, Beyza District, Sepidan County, Fars province, Iran. At the 2006 census, its population was 490, in 113 families.
