= Jafarabad, Behabad =

Jafarabad جعفراباد
- Village
- Location within Iran
- Coordinates: 32°02′43″N 55°57′16″E
- Country: Iran
- Province: Yazd
- County: Behabad
- Bakhsh: Central
- Rural District: Jolgeh

Population (2006)
  - Total: 104
- Time zone: UTC+3:30 (IRST)
  - Summer (DST): UTC+4:30 (IRDT)

Jafarabad (Persian: جعفراباد, also Romanized as Ja‘farābād; also known as Ja’far Abad Bahabad) is a village in Jolgeh Rural District, in the Central District of Behabad County, Yazd Province, Iran. At the 2006 census, its population was 104, in 31 families.
