= Jaffarpur, Jalandhar =

Jaffarpur
- Village
- Country: India
- State: Punjab
- District: Jalandhar
- Tehsil: Shahkot

Government
  - Type: Panchayat raj
  - Body: Gram panchayat

Area
  - Total: 139 ha (340 acres)

Population (2011)
  - Total: 443; 223/220 ♂/♀
  - Scheduled Castes: 154; 81/73 ♂/♀
  - Total Households: 83

Languages
  - Official: Punjabi
- Time zone: UTC+5:30 (IST)
- ISO 3166 code: IN-PB
- Website: jalandhar.gov.in

Jaffarpur is a village in Shahkot in Jalandhar district of Punjab State, India. It is located 14 kilometres (8.7 mi) from sub district headquarter and 50 kilometres (31 mi) from district headquarter. The village is administrated by Sarpanch an elected representative of the village.

== Demography ==
As of 2011, the village has a total number of 83 houses and a population of 443 of which 223 are males while 220 are females. According to the report published by Census India in 2011, out of the total population of the village 154 people are from Schedule Caste and the village does not have any Schedule Tribe population so far.

== See also ==
- List of villages in India
