= Jafarabad, Sharifabad =

Jafarabad جعفراباد
- Village
- Location within Iran
- Coordinates: 29°27′17″N 55°37′31″E
- Country: Iran
- Province: Kerman
- County: Sirjan
- Bakhsh: Central
- Rural District: Sharifabad

Population (2006)
  - Total: 151
- Time zone: UTC+3:30 (IRST)
  - Summer (DST): UTC+4:30 (IRDT)

Jafarabad (Persian: جعفراباد, also Romanized as Ja‘farābād) is a village in Sharifabad Rural District, in the Central District of Sirjan County, Kerman Province, Iran. At the 2006 census, its population was 151, in 39 families.
