= Jafarabad, Qaen =

Jafarabad جعفر آباد
- Village
- Location within Iran
- Coordinates: 33°28′00″N 59°06′00″E
- Country: Iran
- Province: South Khorasan
- County: Qaen
- Bakhsh: Central
- Rural District: Qaen

Population (2006)
  - Total: 233
- Time zone: UTC+3:30 (IRST)
  - Summer (DST): UTC+4:30 (IRDT)

Jafarabad (Persian: جعفر آباد, also Romanized as Ja‘farābād) is a village in Qaen Rural District, in the Central District of Qaen County, South Khorasan Province, Iran. At the 2006 census, its population was 233, in 56 families.
