= Jafarabad, Darreh Shahr =

Jafarabad جعفرآباد
- village
- Location within Iran
- Coordinates: 33°11′57″N 47°22′39″E
- Country: Iran
- Province: Ilam
- County: Darreh Shahr
- Bakhsh: Central
- Rural District: Zarrin Dasht

Population (2006)
  - Total: 142
- Time zone: UTC+3:30 (IRST)
  - Summer (DST): UTC+4:30 (IRDT)

Jafarabad (Persian: جعفرآباد, also Romanized as Ja‘farābād) is a village in Zarrin Dasht Rural District, in the Central District of Darreh Shahr County, Ilam Province, Iran. At the 2006 census, its population was 142, in 24 families. The village is populated by Kurds.
