= Jafarkhan-e Zeytun =

Jafarkhan-e Zeytun جعفرخان زيتون
- Village
- Location within Iran
- Coordinates: 33°46′48″N 47°26′56″E
- Country: Iran
- Province: Lorestan
- County: Kuhdasht
- Bakhsh: Central
- Rural District: Kuhdasht-e Shomali

Population (2006)
  - Total: 57
- Time zone: UTC+3:30 (IRST)
  - Summer (DST): UTC+4:30 (IRDT)

Jafarkhan-e Zeytun (Persian: جعفرخان زيتون, also Romanized as Ja‘farkhān-e Zeytūn; also known as Ja‘farābād Khān-e Zeytūn and Zeytūn-e Vareh Zard) is a village in Kuhdasht-e Shomali Rural District, in the Central District of Kuhdasht County, Lorestan Province, Iran. At the 2006 census, its population was 57, in 20 families.
