= Kalleh-ye Shurehi =

Kalleh-ye Shurehi كله شوره اي
- Village
- Country: Iran
- Province: Sistan and Baluchestan
- County: Khash
- Bakhsh: Nukabad
- Rural District: Taftan-e Jonubi

Population (2006)
  - Total: 233
- Time zone: UTC+3:30 (IRST)
  - Summer (DST): UTC+4:30 (IRDT)

Kalleh-ye Shurehi (Persian: كله شوره اي (جعفراباد), also Romanized as Kalleh-ye Shūreh’ī; also known as Jaʿfarābād) is a village in Taftan-e Jonubi Rural District, Nukabad District, Khash County, Sistan and Baluchestan Province, Iran. At the 2006 census, its population was 233, in 50 families.
