= Alireza Jafari (child soldier) =

Child soldier who died during the 2026 Iran War

- Portrait of Alireza Jafari
- Born: 2014/2015; Iran
- Died: 11 March 2026 (aged 11) Artesh Highway, Tehran, Iran
- Cause of death: Drone strike
- Allegiance: Islamic Republic of Iran
- Branch: Basij
- Conflicts: 2026 Iran War

Alireza Jafari (Persian: علیرضا جعفری; c. 2014/2015 – 11 March 2026) was an 11-year-old Iranian boy who was killed during the 2026 Iran war in a drone strike "while serving" at a checkpoint in Tehran. He served in the Basij before his death. Most sources about the incident emerged after 29 March 2026 when a report was initially relayed via Hengaw.

== Context ==
=== International law and child soldiers ===
The Optional Protocol on the Involvement of Children in Armed Conflict (OPAC) was ratified in 2000. Under the terms of OPAC, states that have ratified it and committed to its contents should "take all feasible measures" to ensure that no child takes a direct part in hostilities and to cease recruitment below the age of 16, even if the Straight-18 standard has become increasingly the norm in multiple nations around the world. Iran signed the OPAC in September 2010, however, they had yet to ratify it as of 2026.

In 2022, the United Nations (UN) verified that nine state armed forces were using children in hostilities, however, Iran was not one of them.

=== Usage of child soldiers in the 2026 Iran War ===
Officials from the Islamic Revolutionary Guard Corps (IRGC), notably including Rahim Nadali, a cultural official with the Guards in Tehran, stated that the minimum age for participation in war‑related support activities, such as staffing checkpoints and participating in patrols, has been lowered to 12 years old, and registration booths were set up in mosques and public squares in Tehran to encourage volunteers, including adolescents, to assist logistical and security operations. The initiative had been called called "For Iran". These developments have drawn criticism from human rights advocates and raised concerns about violations of international norms on the protection of children in armed conflict. Despite the required age being lowered to 12, Alireza was actually 11 at the time of his service and death.

Residents in Tehran spotting "several private cars with teenagers holding Uzis" and "Untrained teenagers with Kalashnikovs shout orders at people". Some parents, according to Radio Free Europe, have been willing to let their kids enlist in the military, such as in the case of Alireza. The mother of the deceased also reported that it was "common" to spot children ages 15 and 16 in similar checkpoints to the ones where her son was killed by a drone strike.

== Death ==
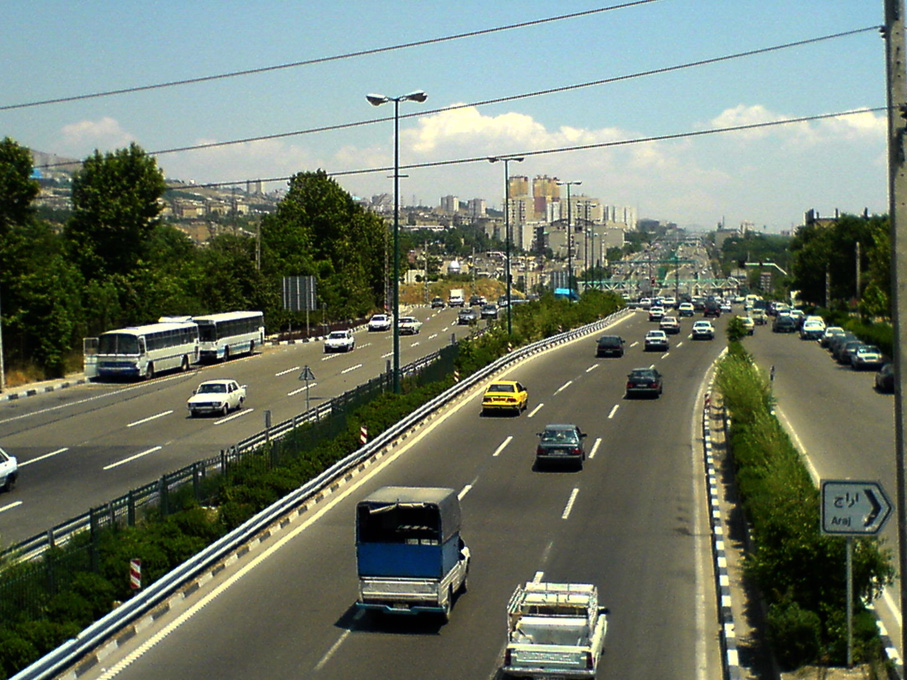
A 2007 photo of Artesh Highway in Tehran, the location where the checkpoint was, in which the boy was stationed before his death.

Alireza Jafari was a 11-year-old boy at the time of the war, and had the war not started he would have been in the fifth grade at school (Year 6). The child was the son of Ramin Jafari, a politically active medic who was recorded participating in various pro-government protests during the 2026 Iran War, and he had four siblings.

His mother, Sadat Monfared, stated in an interview that, due to a Basij personnel shortage, the boy was enlisted by his father alongside one of his brothers, with only four people being present at the time the father brought them along with him. Before departing the boy told his mother that they would "either win this war or [we] become martyrs", also stating that whilst he would have preferred to "win", he would not mind becoming a martyr instead.

He was killed in a drone strike "while serving" together with his father at a checkpoint on Artesh Highway in Tehran. The strike was reported to have been by the Israeli Air Force, which Israeli forces did not deny or confirm, but told the BBC that they would need the coordinates of the site to be sure. His father died alongside him, however his other brother was not reported as a casualty by Mehr News Agency.

== Aftermath ==
=== Reportage ===
The child's death was confirmed by the Basij Teachers Organisation, which officially stated that the boy was "performing his duties" at the time of death. Information about the deceased were also released by the Hengaw Organization for Human Rights, which pressured the United Nations and UNICEF on the matter. The death was also reported by pro-Iranian state medias such as TABNAK News Agency, Fars News Agency. The child's death was directly mentioned by Amnesty International which cited the incident when denouncing the enlistment of child soldiers in Basij as a war crime.
