= Jafarabad, Zavareh =

Jafarabad جعفرآباد
- village
- Location within Iran
- Coordinates: 33°32′55″N 52°30′26″E
- Country: Iran
- Province: Isfahan
- County: Ardestan
- Bakhsh: Zavareh
- Rural District: Rigestan

Population (2006)
  - Total: 50
- Time zone: UTC+3:30 (IRST)
  - Summer (DST): UTC+4:30 (IRDT)

Jafarabad (Persian: جعفرآباد, also Romanized as Ja‘farābād; also known as Ja‘farābād-e Zavāreh) is a village in Rigestan Rural District, Zavareh District, Ardestan County, Isfahan Province, Iran. At the 2006 census, its population was 50, in 14 families.
