= Zareabad, Hamadan =

Zareabad زارع اباد
- Village
- Location within Iran
- Coordinates: 34°05′29″N 48°26′21″E
- Country: Iran
- Province: Hamadan
- County: Nahavand
- Bakhsh: Central
- Rural District: Gamasiyab

Population (2006)
  - Total: 581
- Time zone: UTC+3:30 (IRST)
  - Summer (DST): UTC+4:30 (IRDT)

Zareabad (Persian: زارع اباد, also Romanized as Zāre‘ābād; also known as Ja‘farābād) is a village in Gamasiyab Rural District, in the Central District of Nahavand County, Hamadan Province, Iran. At the 2006 census, its population was 581, in 159 families.
