= Jaffrabad, Tamil Nadu =

Jaffarabad
- Census town
- Location in Tamil Nadu, India Jaffarabad (India)
- Coordinates: 12°42′11″N 78°35′22″E
- Country: India
- State: Tamil Nadu
- District: Vellore

Population (2001)
  - Total: 6,784

Languages
  - Official: Urdu
- Time zone: UTC+5:30 (IST)

Jaffrabad is a census town in Vellore district in the Indian state of Tamil Nadu.

== Demographics ==
As of 2001 India census, Jaffarabad had a population of 6784. Males constitute 50% of the population and females 50%. Jaffrabad has an average literacy rate of 63%, higher than the national average of 59.5%: male literacy is 69%, and female literacy is 57%. In Jaffrabad, 15% of the population is under 6 years of age.
