= Jafarabad, Qatruyeh =

Jafarabad جعفرآباد
- village
- Location within Iran
- Coordinates: 28°57′03″N 54°54′58″E
- Country: Iran
- Province: Fars
- County: Neyriz
- Bakhsh: Qatruyeh
- Rural District: Rizab

Population (2006)
  - Total: 145
- Time zone: UTC+3:30 (IRST)
  - Summer (DST): UTC+4:30 (IRDT)

Jafarabad (Persian: جعفرآباد, also Romanized as Ja‘farābād) is a village in Rizab Rural District, Qatruyeh District, Neyriz County, Fars province, Iran. At the 2006 census, its population was 145, in 27 families.
