= Jafarabad, Kuzaran =

Jaʻfarabad جعفراباد
- Village
- Location within Iran
- Coordinates: 34°18′00″N 47°05′22″E
- Country: Iran
- Province: Kermanshah
- County: Kermanshah
- Bakhsh: Kuzaran
- Rural District: Sanjabi

Population (2006)
  - Total: 139
- Time zone: UTC+3:30 (IRST)
  - Summer (DST): UTC+4:30 (IRDT)

Jaʻfarabad (Persian: جعفراباد, also Romanized as Ja‘farābād) is a village in Sanjabi Rural District, Kuzaran District, Kermanshah County, Kermanshah Province, Iran. At the 2006 census, its population was 139, in 32 families.
