= Wasim Jafri =

S. M. Wasim Jafri
- Born: SM Wasim Jafri; Lahore, Pakistan
- Education: Dow Medical College & University of Karachi
- Occupations: Gastroenterologist, Head of the Gastroenterology Section, Aga Khan University
- Website: Jafri's Profile at AKU

S. M. Wasim Jafri (Urdu: ايس ايم وسيم جعفرى) is a Pakistani gastroenterologist. He serves as a professor of medicine and head of the gastroenterology section at the Aga Khan University Hospital (AKUH), Karachi, Pakistan. He obtained his high school education at the Don Bosco High School, Lahore. His family moved from Lahore to Karachi where he studied at the D. J. Science College. He later studied medicine at the Dow Medical College, Karachi and obtained his MBBS degree from the University of Karachi.

Jafri received training in general medicine and gastroenterology between 1978 and 1984 in England. He is one of the leading gastroenterologists in his region. He has authored more than 70 publications in peer reviewed journals. His main areas of interest are chronic liver diseases from hepatitis B and C.

He is the patron of the Pakistan Society for the Study of Liver Diseases (PSSLD).
