= Filab, Khuzestan =

Filab فيلاب
- Village
- Location within Iran
- Coordinates: 32°52′04″N 49°09′35″E
- Country: Iran
- Province: Khuzestan
- County: Dezful
- Bakhsh: Sardasht
- Rural District: Darreh Kayad

Population (2006)
  - Total: 35
- Time zone: UTC+3:30 (IRST)
  - Summer (DST): UTC+4:30 (IRDT)

Filab (Persian: فيلاب, also Romanized as Fīlāb) is a village in Darreh Kayad Rural District, Sardasht District, Dezful County, Khuzestan Province, Iran. At the 2006 census, its population was 35, in 5 families.
