= Jafrabad, Bhopal =

Jafrabad
- village
- Location within Madhya Pradesh Location within India
- Coordinates: 23.5119006°N 77.3180836°E
- Country: India
- State: Madhya Pradesh
- District: Bhopal
- Tehsil: Berasia
- Elevation: 499 m (1,637 ft)

Population (2011)
  - Total: 345
- Time zone: UTC+5:30 (IST)
- ISO 3166 code: MP-IN
- 2011 census code: 482290

Jafrabad is a village in the Bhopal district of Madhya Pradesh, India. It is located in the Berasia tehsil.

== Demographics ==
According to the 2011 census of India, Jafrabad has 68 households. The effective literacy rate (i.e. the literacy rate of population excluding children aged 6 and below) is 75.43%.

Demographics (2011 Census)
	Total	Male	Female
Population	345	177	168
Children aged below 6 years	56	27	29
Scheduled caste	80	34	46
Scheduled tribe	0	0	0
Literates	218	126	92
Workers (all)	134	71	63
Main workers (total)	71	65	6
Main workers: Cultivators	46	45	1
Main workers: Agricultural labourers	25	20	5
Main workers: Household industry workers	0	0	0
Main workers: Other	0	0	0
Marginal workers (total)	63	6	57
Marginal workers: Cultivators	9	0	9
Marginal workers: Agricultural labourers	50	4	46
Marginal workers: Household industry workers	4	2	2
Marginal workers: Others	0	0	0
Non-workers	211	106	105
