= Jafarabad, Ferdows =

Jafarabad جعفراباد
- Village
- Location within Iran
- Coordinates: 30°43′33″N 55°53′02″E
- Country: Iran
- Province: Kerman
- County: Rafsanjan
- Bakhsh: Ferdows
- Rural District: Rezvan

Population (2006)
  - Total: 318
- Time zone: UTC+3:30 (IRST)
  - Summer (DST): UTC+4:30 (IRDT)

Jafarabad (Persian: جعفراباد, also Romanized as Ja‘farābād; also known as Ja‘farābād-e Nūq and Ja‘far Abad Noq) is a village in Rezvan Rural District, Ferdows District, Rafsanjan County, Kerman Province, Iran. At the 2006 census, its population was 318, in 78 families.
