= Jafarabad, Divandarreh =

Jafarabad جعفر آباد
- Village
- Location within Iran
- Coordinates: 36°00′31″N 47°06′06″E
- Country: Iran
- Province: Kurdistan
- County: Divandarreh
- Bakhsh: Central
- Rural District: Qaratureh

Population (2006)
  - Total: 445
- Time zone: UTC+3:30 (IRST)
  - Summer (DST): UTC+4:30 (IRDT)

Jafarabad (Persian: جعفر آباد, also Romanized as Ja‘farābād) is a village in Qaratureh Rural District, in the Central District of Divandarreh County, Kurdistan Province, Iran. At the 2006 census, its population was 445, in 83 families. The village is populated by Kurds.
