= Abdel Fattah Jafri =

Moroccan footballer

Personal information
- Date of birth: 25 February 1950 (age 76)
- Position: Midfielder

International career
Years	Team	Apps	(Gls)
- Morocco

Abdel Fattah Jafri (born 25 February 1950) is a Moroccan former footballer. He competed in the men's tournament at the 1972 Summer Olympics.
