= Syed Waqar Jaffry =

Pakistani academic and researcher

- Born: 1978 (age 47–48); Lahore, Pakistan
- Education: Government College Lahore; University of the Punjab; Vrije Universiteit Amsterdam
- Occupation: Academic
- Employer: University of the Punjab

Syed Waqar ul Qounain Jaffry (Urdu: سید وقارالکونین جعفری; born 1978) is a Pakistani academic and researcher in the field of computer science and artificial intelligence. He is a full Professor of Artificial Intelligence, Director of National Centre of Artificial Intelligence, and Chairman of the Department of Information Technology at the University of the Punjab, Lahore.

== Early life ==
Jaffry was born in 1978 to an educated, Punjabi-speaking, Syed family in Lahore, Pakistan. He received his college degrees from the Government College Lahore, and MSc. Computer Science from the Department of Computer Science, University of the Punjab, Lahore. He earned a PhD degree with ranked Highest Accolade (excellent) in Computer Science and Artificial Intelligence at Agent Systems Research Group, Department of Artificial Intelligence, Vrije Universiteit Amsterdam.

== Career ==
Jaffry started his career as a lecturer at the University of the Punjab and elevated to a full professor. He is associated with the Punjab University College of Information Technology (PUCIT) since 2000. He also served on various academic and administrative positions as Graduate Program Coordinator, ACM Student Chapter Adviser, Chairman Computer Society, Secretary of Doctoral Program Committee (DPC), Graduate Financial Support Committee, Research Advisory Committee, Curriculum Development Committee etc.

Jaffry is currently serving as the Director of National Centre of Artificial Intelligence (NCAI), and Chairman of the Department of Information Technology, University of the Punjab, Lahore.

== Services ==
Jaffry is serving as a Vice Chair, IEEE Computer Society, Lahore Section. He served as Technical Co-Chair in IEEE International Conference on Advancement in Computational Sciences (ICACS). As the chief organizer, he organized the National Software Exhibition and Competition (SOFTExpo) for five consecutive years from 2013 to 2017. In this event, besides software and programming competitions, he initiated and executed the first ever National Graduate Research Symposium. In the K-12 curriculum, he is the Convener of External Review Committee for Computer Science and Information Technology Textbooks at Punjab Curriculum and Textbook Board (PCTB), Lahore. Besides textbook evaluator at PCTB, he is also serving as the Convener of Review Committee for the Review of Curriculum of Computer Science and Information Technology for Grades VI-XII at Punjab Curriculum and Textbook Board, Lahore. In this committee, he designed a curriculum for the subject of Computer Science and Information Technology (ICT) at Grades VI-XII at the Punjab province.

== Published works ==
Jaffry has contributed to over 70 books, book chapters, research articles, and policy drafts in professional international conferences, journals, and public forums.

== Honours and awards ==
- Senior Member, Institute of Electrical and Electronics Engineers (IEEE)
- Senior Member, Association for Computing Machinery (ACM)
- Chair, Conferences Committee, Institute of Electrical and Electronics Engineers (IEEE), Lahore Section.
- PhD Approved Supervisor, Higher Education Commission (HEC), Islamabad, Pakistan.
- Evaluator, Research Funding Proposals of Ignite, National Information and Communication Technology Research and Development (ICTRnD) Ignite Fund, Islamabad, Pakistan.
- Program Evaluator, National Computing Education Accreditation Council (NCEAC), Higher Education Commission (HEC), Islamabad, Pakistan.
- Member Board of Studies, Department of Computer Science and Information Technology, University of Engineering and Technology, Peshawar, Pakistan.
- Member Board of Studies, Centre for Data Science, Government College University (GCU), Faisalabad, Pakistan.
- Director, Agent-based Computational Modeling Laboratory, National Center of Artificial Intelligence (NCAI), Pakistan.
- Member Judging Panel, National Grassroots ICT Research Initiative (NGIRI), Ignite, National Information and Communication Technology Research and Development (ICTRnD) Fund, Islamabad, Pakistan.
- Technical Co-Chair, IEEE International Conference on the Advancements in Computational Sciences.
- Vice Chair, IEEE Computer Society (CS), Lahore Section, Lahore, Pakistan.
- Convener, External Review Committee for the Computer Science and Information Technology Textbooks, Punjab Curriculum and Textbook Board, Punjab, Pakistan.
- Convener, Committee for Single National Curriculum (SNC) of the Computer Studies Grades VI-XII, Punjab Curriculum and Textbook Board, Punjab, Pakistan.
- Convener, Review Committee for the review of the Curriculum of Computer Science and Information Technology for Grades VI-XII, Punjab Curriculum and Textbook Board, Punjab, Pakistan.
- Advisor for Interview, Punjab Public Service Commission, Lahore, Pakistan.
