= Jafarabad, Tehran =

Jafarabad جعفرآباد
- Village
- Location within Iran
- Coordinates: 35°47′6.612″N 51°57′15.336″E
- Country: Iran
- Province: Tehran
- County: Damavand
- Bakhsh: Rudehen
- Rural District: Abali

Population (2006)
  - Total: 19
- Time zone: UTC+3:30 (IRST)

Jafarabad (Persian: جعفرآباد, also Romanized as Ja‘farābād; also known as Ja‘farābād-e Jangal, Gachīābād-e Pā’īn and Gachīābād) is a village in Abali Rural District, Rudehen District, Damavand County, Tehran Province, Iran. At the 2006 census, its population was 19, in 10 families.

Jafarabad had 0 residents in 2016.
