= Jafarabad-e Jangal, Varamin =

Village in Tehran province, Iran

Jafarabad-e Jangal Persian: جعفرابادجنگل
- Village
- Location within Iran
- Coordinates: 35°13′29″N 51°38′45″E
- Country: Iran
- Province: Tehran
- County: Varamin
- District: Javadabad
- Rural District: Behnamarab-e Jonubi

Population (2016)
  - Total: 675
- Time zone: UTC+3:30 (IRST)

Jafarabad-e Jangal (Persian: جعفرابادجنگل) (Note: Also romanized as Ja‘farābād-e Jangal) is a village in Behnamarab-e Jonubi Rural District of Javadabad District in Varamin County, Tehran province, Iran.

== Demographics ==
=== Population ===
At the time of the 2006 National Census, the village's population was 435 in 107 households. The following census in 2011 counted 516 people in 148 households. The 2016 census measured the population of the village as 675 people in 197 households.
