= Cəfərabad, Jabrayil =

Jafarabad
- Azerbaijani: Cəfərabad
- Location within Azerbaijan
- Coordinates: 39°20′23″N 47°10′35″E
- Country: Azerbaijan
- District: Jabrayil

Population
  - Total: 0
- Time zone: UTC+4 (AZT)
  - Summer (DST): UTC+5 (AZT)

Cəfərabad (also, Jafarabad) is a village in Jabrayil District, Azerbaijan. Currently uninhabited.

On October 4, 2020, according to the President of Azerbaijan, the village was captured by the Army of Azerbaijan.
