= Cəfərabad, Shaki =

Jafarabad
- Municipality
- Azerbaijani: Cəfərabad
- Location within Azerbaijan Location within Shaki-Zagatala Economic Region
- Coordinates: 41°01′17″N 47°09′17″E
- Country: Azerbaijan
- District: Shaki

Population
  - Total: 1,937
- Time zone: UTC+4 (AZT)
  - Summer (DST): UTC+5 (AZT)

Cəfərabad (also, Jafarabad) is a village and municipality in the Shaki District of Azerbaijan. It has a population of 1,937. The municipality consists of the villages of Jafarabad and Cholagly.
