= Saman Sultana Jaffri =

Pakistani politician

Saman Sultana Jafri

Member of the National Assembly of Pakistan
- In office 1 June 2013 – 31 May 2018
- Constituency: Reserved seat for women

Saman Sultana Jafri (Urdu: سمن سلطانہ جعفری) is a Pakistani politician who was a member of the National Assembly of Pakistan from June 2013 to May 2018.

== Political career ==
She was one of the youngest woman to be elected to the National Assembly of Pakistan from Karachi as a candidate of Muttahida Qaumi Movement on a reserved seat for women from Sindh in the 2013 Pakistani general election.
