= Vanu, Iran =

Vanu ونو
- Village
- Location within Iran
- Coordinates: 34°08′23″N 47°40′17″E
- Country: Iran
- Province: Lorestan
- County: Delfan
- Bakhsh: Kakavand
- Rural District: Kakavand-e Sharqi

Population (2006)
  - Total: 84
- Time zone: UTC+3:30 (IRST)
  - Summer (DST): UTC+4:30 (IRDT)

Vanu (Persian: ونو, also Romanized as Vanū; also known as Jafarabad (Persian: جعفرآباد), also Romanized as Ja‘farābād) is a village in Kakavand-e Sharqi Rural District, Kakavand District, Delfan County, Lorestan Province, Iran. At the 2006 census, its population was 84, in 21 families.
