= Jafarabad-e Olya, Kakavand =

Jafarabad-e Olya جعفرآباد عليا
- Village
- Location within Iran
- Coordinates: 34°12′30″N 47°48′21″E
- Country: Iran
- Province: Lorestan
- County: Delfan
- Bakhsh: Kakavand
- Rural District: Kakavand-e Sharqi

Population (2006)
  - Total: 90
- Time zone: UTC+3:30 (IRST)
  - Summer (DST): UTC+4:30 (IRDT)

Jafarabad-e Olya (Persian: جعفرآباد عليا, also Romanized as Ja‘farābād-e ‘Olyā; also known as Ja‘farābād) is a village in Kakavand-e Sharqi Rural District, Kakavand District, Delfan County, Lorestan Province, Iran. At the 2006 census, its population was 90, in 22 families.
