= Jafarabad-e Olya, Fars =

Jafarabad-e Olya جعفرآباد عليا
- village
- Location within Iran
- Coordinates: 30°26′32″N 53°40′43″E
- Country: Iran
- Province: Fars
- County: Bavanat
- Bakhsh: Central
- Rural District: Baghestan

Population (2006)
  - Total: 460
- Time zone: UTC+3:30 (IRST)
  - Summer (DST): UTC+4:30 (IRDT)

Jafarabad-e Olya (Persian: جعفرآباد عليا, also Romanized as Ja‘farābād-e 'Olyā; also known as Ja‘farābād, Ja‘farābād Bāla, Ja‘farābād-e Bālā, and Ja‘farābād-e Morzeh Qolī Khān) is a village in Baghestan Rural District, in the Central District of Bavanat County, Fars province, Iran. At the 2006 census, its population was 460, in 126 families.
