= Jafarabad, Nahavand =

Jafarabad جعفرآباد
- village
- Location within Iran
- Coordinates: 34°14′36″N 48°08′19″E
- Country: Iran
- Province: Hamadan
- County: Nahavand
- Bakhsh: Khezel
- Rural District: Solgi

Population (2006)
  - Total: 159
- Time zone: UTC+3:30 (IRST)
  - Summer (DST): UTC+4:30 (IRDT)

Jafarabad (Persian: جعفرآباد, also Romanized as Ja‘farābād; also known as Ja‘farābād-e Bālā, Ja‘farābād-e ‘Olya, and Ja’far Abad Olya) is a village in Solgi Rural District, Khezel District, Nahavand County, Hamadan Province, Iran. At the 2006 census, its population was 159, in 37 families.
