= Quchan Atiq Rural District =

Rural district in Razavi Khorasan province, Iran

Quchan Atiq Rural District Persian: دهستان قوچان عتيق
- Rural District
- Location within Iran
- Coordinates: 37°06′N 58°26′E
- Country: Iran
- Province: Razavi Khorasan
- County: Quchan
- District: Quchan Atiq
- Established: 1987
- Capital: Asgharabad

Population (2016)
  - Total: 21,037
- Time zone: UTC+3:30 (IRST)

Quchan Atiq Rural District (Persian: دهستان قوچان عتيق) is in Quchan Atiq District of Quchan County, Razavi Khorasan province, Iran. Its capital is the village of Asgharabad. The previous capital of the rural district was the village of Shahr-e Kohneh, now a city.

== Demographics ==
=== Population ===
At the time of the 2006 National Census, the village's population (as a part of the Central District) was 24,559 in 6,137 households. There were 23,226 inhabitants in 6,663 households at the following census of 2011. The 2016 census measured the population of the village as 21,037 in 6,521 households. The most populous of its 48 villages was Shahr-e Kohneh (now a city), with 3,320 people.

In 2020, the rural district was separated from the district in the formation of Quchan Atiq District.

=== Other villages in the rural district ===
- Alaqeh Janban
- Askariyeh
- Fakhrabad
- Fathabad
- Filab
- Gowjeh
- Joneydabad
- Khomartash
- Kohneh Forud
- Kolukhi
- Mohammadabad-e Olya
- Mohammadabad-e Sofla
- Moheb Saraj
- Nasimabd
- Neyyat
- Nowruzi
- Padegan-e Quchan
- Salanquch
- Sarab
- Shurak-e Hajji
- Shurak-e Tupkanlu
- Yazdanabad-e Olya
- Zeydanlu
- Zubaran
