= Quchan Atiq District =

District in Razavi Khorasan province, Iran

Quchan Atiq District Persian: بخش قوچان عتیق
- District
- Location within Iran
- Coordinates: 37°06′N 58°21′E
- Country: Iran
- Province: Razavi Khorasan
- County: Quchan
- Established: 2020
- Capital: Shahr-e Kohneh
- Time zone: UTC+3:30 (IRST)

Quchan Atiq District (Persian: بخش قوچان عتیق) is in Quchan County, Razavi Khorasan province, Iran. Its capital is the city of Shahr-e Kohneh, whose population at the time of the 2016 National Census was 3,320 people in 1,062 households.

== History ==
In 2020, Quchan Atiq Rural District was separated from the Central District in the formation of Quchan Atiq District. The village of Shahr-e Kohneh was converted to a city in 2021.

== Demographics ==
=== Administrative divisions ===
Quchan Atiq District
Administrative Divisions
Quchan Atiq RD
Yazdan RD
Shahr-e Kohneh (city) (Note: Became a city after the 2016 census)
RD = Rural District
