= Khorasani Kurds =

Kurds living in the Khorasan region of Iran

Kurdish: Kurdên Xorasanê Persian: کردهای خراسان
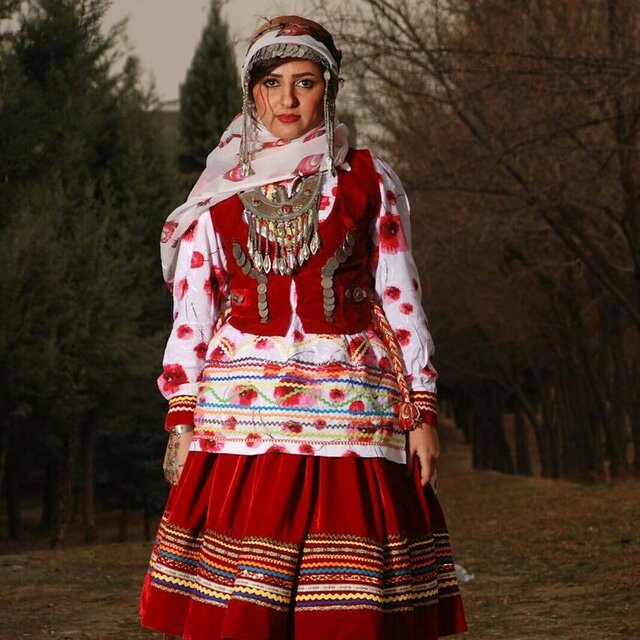
- Khorasani Kurds in traditional clothes

Total population
- 500,000 to 1,000,000

Regions with significant populations
- mainly North Khorasan, but also Razavi Khorasan, and Golestan province

Languages
- Kurdish, Persian, Khorasani Turkic

Religion
- Islam

Khorasani Kurds (Kurdish: Kurdên Xorasanê; Persian: کردهای خراسان) are Kurds who live in the provinces of North Khorasan and Razavi Khorasan in northeastern Iran, along the Iran-Turkmenistan border. Khorasani Kurds speak the Kurmanji dialect of Kurdish and are Shia Muslims. Many Khorasani Kurds are bilingual in Khorasani Turkic, mainly due to intermarriages with Khorasani Turks. However, Persian is the lingua franca. There are about 696 Kurdish villages in the two Khorasan provinces. Many tribes are closely connected to the Khorasani Turks.

== History ==
Deportations of Kurds from present-day Turkish Kurdistan and South Caucasus to Khorasan were initiated by Ismail I and continued under Tahmasp I in the early 16th century. A further 45,000 Kurdish families were deported from 1598 to 1601. In the following decades, five Kurdish domains were established in Khorasan by Abbas the Great stretching from Astarabad to Chenaran. During the reign of Nader Shah, Kurds from Ardalan and those already deported to Khorasan were settled in Gilan Province.

The main reason behind the deportations was the desire to create a defense-line against Turkmen and Uzbek nomads from Central Asia.

== Culture ==
Khorasani Kurds have interacted with nearby Khorasani Turkic and Turkmen tribes. Some works of the most famous Khorasani Kurdish poet, Ja'far Qoli, of late 19th century, were modelled on the 18th-century Turkmen ashik Magtymguly's verses and also Khorasani Turkic verses.

== Language ==
Khorasani Kurdish is a dialect of Kurmanji and lacks distinct sub-dialects. It is influenced by Persian, Khorasani Turkic, and Turkmen languages. Two of the four major Khorasani Kurdish tribes, Zafaranlu and Shadlu, mainly speak Khorasani Turkic.

== Tribes ==
Major Kurdish tribes of Khorasan are Za'faranlu, Shadlu, Keyvanlu, and Sheikh Amarlu.

According to Abbasali Madih, Kurdish tribes in Khorasan include the Amar, Baçvan, Badlan, Berivan, Bicervan, Çapeş, Davan, Hamazkan, Izan, Keyvan, Mamyan, Mastyan, Mozdegan, Palokan, Qaçkan (or Qoch-quyunlu), Qarabash, Qaraçur, Qaraman, Reşwan, Rudkan, Sevkan, Silsepuran, Şad, Şeyhkan, Şirvan, Torosan, Tukan, Topkan, Zafaran, Zangalan, Zaraqkan, Zardkan and Zeydan. However, several tribes such as Qaramanlu and Silsepuranlu or Silsüpür ('sweep-clean' in Turkic) are of Turkoman origins. Some tribes are mixed with the nearby Khorasani Turks and experience confusion of identity.

Other tribes include the Lak in Kalat and Darragaz who still speak Laki.

== Villages ==
=== Bojnord ===
Kurdish villages in Bojnord include:
- Ab Chur
- Abdollahabad
- Adineh Qoli
- Akhli
- Aq Tappeh
- Ark
- Atrabad-e Olya
- Baba Aman
- Badamloq
- Badranlu
- Baghcheq
- Band-e Khodanlu
- Band-e Yaghmur
- Barbar
- Barbar Qaleh
- Baz Khaneh
- Bazranlu
- Bidak
- Borj
- Burbur
- Chahar Kharvar
- Chahar Borj-e Olya
- Chahar Borj-e Sofla
- Cherik
- Daraghanlu
- Dongal
- Garmkhan
- Gomhay-e Burbur
- Haj Alidad
- Haj Zeynolabedin
- Halimabad
- Hamami
- Hamid
- Hamzanlu
- Hasanlu
- Hesar-e Garmkhan (town)
- Ideh
- Injanlu
- Jafarabad
- Jammi
- Jolof Darreh
- Kalab
- Kalateh-ye Ashian
- Kalateh-ye Aqa Nabi
- Kalateh-ye Ardeshirkhan
- Kalateh-ye Baqer Khan Yek
- Kalateh-ye Baqer Khan Do
- Kalateh-ye Baqer Khan Seh
- Kalateh-ye Borj
- Kalateh-ye Chelu
- Kalateh-ye Eslahat-e Ardi
- Kalateh-ye Farshchi
- Kalateh-ye Hajiqasem
- Kalateh-ye Haji-Nosrat
- Kalateh-ye Molla Gholamhoseyn
- Kalateh-ye Naqi
- Kalateh-ye Pahlvanlu
- Kalateh-ye Sohrab
- Khandaqlu
- Khattab
- Ki Ki
- Kuh Kamar
- Langar
- Matranlu
- Mehnan
- Mirza Hasanlu
- Najafabad
- Nargeslu-ye Olya
- Nargeslu-ye Sofla
- Nav
- Niki Qaleh
- Now Deh
- Oush-Qaleh-ye Bala
- Owzan Bijeh
- Pakotal
- Parkanlu
- Pashindeh
- Pasandarreh
- Pir Boz
- Qadi
- Qaleh Joq-e Bozorg
- Qaleh Joq-e Kuchak
- Qaleh Marmar
- Qaleh Shaban
- Qaleh-ye Tut
- Qarah Bashlu
- Qarah Jangal-e Olya
- Qarah Qanlu
- Qarehlu
- Qarehbanluy
- Qarajeh
- Qarloq
- Qasr-e Qajar
- Qeshlaq-e Naveh
- Qezel Hesar
- Qezelqan
- Qush Tappeh
- Ranaabad
- Rashvanlu
- Serivan Asheqan
- Serivan Tappeh
- Shah Ojaq
- Shah Pasand
- Sheykh Aliabad-e Qarhar
- Sisab
- Siyukhosu-Moradkhan
- Suluklu
- Surg
- Tar Golam
- Ubeh
- Utarabad-e Sofla
- Vasli Qaleh
- Yekkeh Shakh
- Zanganeh
- Zarneh

=== Torbat-e Jam ===
One Kurdish village exists in Torbat-e Jam County:

- Zeyli

== See also ==
- Kurds in Afghanistan
- Kurds of Central Anatolia
- Kurds in Iran
- A Modern History of the Kurds by David McDowall

== Bibliography ==
- Madih, ‘Abbas-‘ Ali (2007), "The Kurds of Khorasan", Iran and the Caucasus, 11 (1): 11–31, doi:10.1163/157338407X224879
