= Əli Bayramlı (disambiguation) =

Əli Bayramlı may refer to:

- Şirvan, Azerbaijan, Azerbaijan
- Əli Bayramlı, Zaqatala, Azerbaijan
- Əli Bayramlı, Kalbajar, Azerbaijan
- Əli Bayramlı, Qakh, Azerbaijan
- Əli Bayramlı, Qazakh, Azerbaijan
- Əli Bayramlı, Samukh, Azerbaijan
- Yeni Əlibayramlı, Azerbaijan
