= Khorasani Turkic =

Oghuz Turkic language spoken in Iran

- خراسان توٚركیسی Xorasan Türkîsi
- Khorasani Turkic written in the Nastaliq hand.
- Native to: Iran
- Region: North Khorasan
- Ethnicity: Khorasani Turks
- Native speakers: 400,000–900,000 (2015–2019)
- Language family: Turkic: Common Turkic; Oghuz; Eastern; Khorasani Turkic
- Writing system: Nastaliq

Language codes
- ISO 639-3: kmz
- Glottolog: khor1269
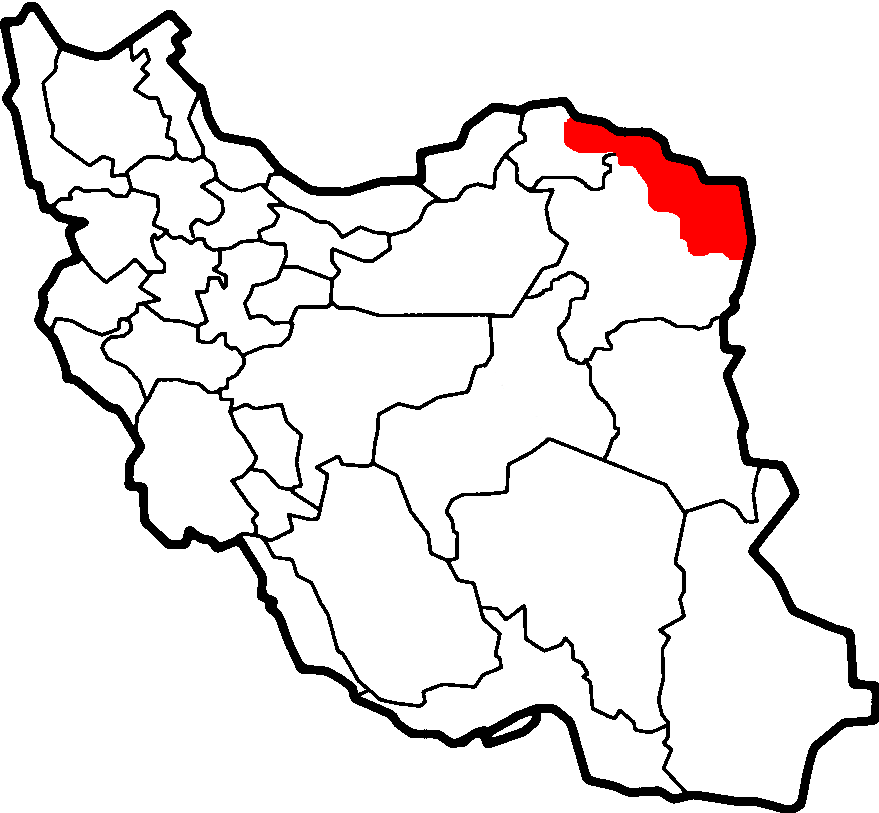
- Map of Khorasani Turkic distribution per Ethnologue

- Khorasani Turkic is classified as Vulnerable by the UNESCO Atlas of the World's Languages in Danger

Khorasani Turkic or Khorasani is an Oghuz Turkic language spoken in the North Khorasan Province and the Razavi Khorasan Province in Iran. Nearly all Khorasani Turkic speakers are also bilingual in Persian.

== Geographic distribution ==
Blue: NW, Red: SW, Yellow: SE, Brown: N, Cyan: NE

The distribution is as following, according to Gerhard Doerfer.

- Northwest dialect: Sheykh Teymur, Bojnord and Asadli in North Khorasan province
- Southwest dialect: Joghatai, Hokmabad, Soltanabad, Qarah Bagh, Pir Komaj
- Southeast dialect: Kharv, Abdollahabad, Caram-Sarjäm, Kalat
- North dialect: Ziarat, Shirvan, Zavarom, Quchan, Shurok, Lotfabad, Dargaz, Dughayi
- Northeast dialect: Mareshk, Jonk, Gujgi, Langar

== Dialects ==
Khorasani Turkic is split into North, South and West dialects. The northern dialect is spoken in North Khorasan near Quchan; the southern in Soltanabad, near Sabzevar; the western, around Bojnord.

== Classification and related languages ==
Khorasani Turkic belongs to the Oghuz group of Turkic languages, which also includes Turkish, Azerbaijani, Gagauz, Balkan Gagauz, Qashqai, Turkmen and Salar.

Khorasani Turkic was first classified as a separate dialect by Iranian Azerbaijani linguist Javad Heyat in the book Tārikh-e zabān o lahcayā-ye Türki (History of the Turkic dialects). According to some linguists, it should be considered intermediate linguistically between Azerbaijani and Turkmen, although it is sufficiently distinct not to be considered a dialect of either. It is considered by Turkic scholars to be most closely related to the other Oghuz varieties spoken in Iran, and a close relationship with Turkmen has been disputed on the basis of the comparisons of the core set of agglutinating morphemes.

Doerfer and Hesche classify Khorasani Turkic into different branches within the Oghuz languages.

- Oghuz
  - Central Oghuz
    Southeastern Khorasani Turkish
  - Southern Oghuz
    - Northwestern Khorasani Turkish
    - Southwestern Khorasani Turkish
  - Eastern Oghuz
    - Northern Khorasani Turkish
    - Northeastern Khorasani Turkish

According to Robert Lindsay, Khorasani Turkic has four branches:

- Khorasani Turkic
  - Northwest Khorasani Turkic (Bojnurd (ru))
  - North-Northeast-Langar Khorasani Turkic
  - Southern Khorasani Turkic
  - Afshar

Glottolog lists seven distinct dialects:

- Khorasan Turkic
  - Langar
  - Northeast Khorasan Turkic
  - North Khorasan Turkic
  - Northwest Khorasan Turkic
  - Southeast Khorasan Turkic
  - South Khorasan Turkic
  - West Quchani

== Phonology ==
=== Consonants ===
		Labial	Alveolar	Palatal	Velar	Uvular	Glottal
Nasal		m	n	ɲ	ŋ		
Plosive/ Affricate	voiceless	p	t	t͡ʃ	k	q	
Plosive/ Affricate	voiced	b	d	d͡ʒ	ɡ		
Fricative	voiceless	f	s	ʃ	x		h
Fricative	voiced	v	z	ʒ	ɣ		
Flap			ɾ				
Approximant			l	j			

=== Vowels ===
Vowels
	Front		Back	
	unrounded	rounded	unrounded	rounded
Close	i	y	ɯ	u
Mid	e	ø		o
Open	æ		ɑ	

All vowels have phonemic length distinction. The vowel /ɑ/ is rounded to [ɒ] when following the vowels /u/ and /i/ (short and long) as well as long /oː/ (Muxabbat [muxɒbbɑt] "love", İnsan [insɒn] "human"). On the other hand, short /o/ and all other vowels do not cause this rounding of /ɑ/. (Yoldaşlık [joldɑʃlɯk] "friendship"). /ɑ/ is always pronounced [ɑ] in plurals (& for some speakers, it is pronounced as such unconditionally)

== Writing system ==
Khorasani Turkic is not often written, but it may be with the Persian alphabet in the Perso-Arabic script. Khorasani Turkic orthography is identical to the Azerbaijani Arabic alphabet.

As Khorasani Turkic has more vowel sounds than either Arabic or Persian, and as the base Arabic letters are inadequate to distinguish between the divergent vowel sounds (wherein mispronunciation can at times change the meaning of words), same as in Azerbaijani Arabic alphabet, diacritics on top of existing letters are used. However, in everyday usage, these diacritics are often dropped and pronunciation is derived from context and from vowel/consonant harmony rules. In the table below, these vowels are shown with a beige background.

Letter	Romanization	IPA
ا	a	/ɑ/, /æ/, /Ø/
ب	b	/b/
پ	p	/p/
ت	t	/t/
ث	(s)	/s/
ج	c	/d͡ʒ/
چ	ç	/t͡ʃ/
ح	(h)	/h/
خ	x	/x/
د	d	/d/
ذ	(z)	/z/
ر	r	/r/
ز	z	/z/
ژ	j	/ʒ/
س	s	/s/
ش	ş	/ʃ/
ص	(s)	/s/
ض	(d)	/d/
ط	(t)	/t/
ظ	(z)	/z/
ع	’	/æ/, /Ø/
غ	ǧ	/ɣ/
ف	f	/f/
ق	q	/q/
ک	k	/k/
گ	g	/ɡ/
ل	l	/l/
م	m	/m/
ن	n	/n~ŋ/
و	v, o, u, ü	/v~w/, /o/, /u/, /y/
وْ	o	/o/
وُ	u	/u/
وٚ	ü	/y/
ؤ	ö	/ø/
ه	h, ə	/h/, /æ/
ی	y, ı, i	/j/, /ɯ/, /i/
یٛ	ı	/ɯ/
ئ	e	/e/
ء	ʿ	/ʔ/
نگ	ng	/ŋ(g)/

== Morphology ==
=== Nouns ===
==== Pluralization ====
Pluralization is marked on nouns with the suffix /-lar/, which has the two forms -lar and -lər, depending on vowel harmony. As mentioned in the phonology section, plural /ɑ/ is never rounded to [ɒ], even when it follows /u/, /oː/ or /i/.

==== Case ====
Nouns in Khorasani Turkic take a number of case endings that change based on vowel harmony and whether they follow a vowel or a consonant:

Case
	After Vowels	After Consonants
Nominative	No Ending	
Genitive	nıñ/nin	iŋ/in
Dative	ya yə	a/æ
Accusative	ni/nı	i/ɯ
Locative	da/də	
Ablative	dan/dən	
Instrumental	nan/nən	

==== Possession ====
Possession is marked with a suffix on the possessed noun.

	Singular	Plural
1st Person	(I)m	(I)mIz
2nd Person	(I)ŋ	(I)ŋIz
3rd Person	(s)I	lArI

=== Pronouns ===
Khorasani Turkic has six personal pronouns. Occasionally, personal pronouns take different case endings from regular nouns.

	Singular	Plural
1st Person	mən	bız
2nd Person	sən	siz
3rd Person	o	olar

=== Verbs ===
Verbs are conjugated for tense, aspect, mood, person, and number. The infinitive form of the verb ends in -max.

== Sample text ==
Excerpt from Tulu (1989) p. 90

Translation	IPA	Romanization	Arabic script (Iran)
Thus, there was a padishah named Ziyad.	ɑl ɣæssa bir zijæːd pæːdiʃæːhiː bæːɾɨdɨ	Al ğəssə bir Ziyəd pədişəhi bərıdı	.ال غسا بیر زياد پدیشهی بـهریدی
Almighty God had given him no son.	xodɒːʷændi æːlæm ona hit͡ʃ ɔɣul ataː elæmɑmiʃdi		.خوداوندی آلم اونا هیچ اوغول اتا ایلهمامیشدی
Then, he spoke to his vizier: "O Vizier, I have no son. What shall I do about it?"	bæːdæn vaziːɾæ dədi, ej vaziːɾ, mændæ ki ɔɣul joxdɨ, mæn næ t͡ʃaːɾæ ejlem	Bədən vazirə dedi: "Ey vazir, məndə ki oğul yoxdı. Mən nə çarə eylem?	بدن وازیره دهدی: «ای وازیر, منده کی اوغول یوخدی. من نه چاره ایولیم»؟
The vizier said: "Ruler of the whole world, what will you do with this possession?"	vaziːɾ dedi, pɒːdiʃaː-i ɢɨblæ-ji ɒːlæm, sæn bu mɒːlɨ-æmwɒːlɨ næjlijæsæn	Vazir dedi: "Padişa'i qıbləyi aləm, sən bu malıəmvalı nəyləyəsən?"	وازیر دهدی: «پادیشای قیبلنهیی آلم, سن بو معلیموالی نیلیسن»؟

== See also ==
- Bayat (tribe)

== Additional resources ==
- (Persian) Qolizadeh Marzaji, Jalal (جلال قلی زاده مرزجی) (2011). Getting acquainted with the Khorasani Turkish language (آشنایی با زبان ترکی خراسانی). Mashhad, Iran: Damineh. ISBN 978-964-5805-91-1. (Downloadable from: https://turuz.com/storage/Language/2015/0861-_Dil_Ashnayi_Ba_Zabane_Turki_Xorasani_Celal_Qulizade_Merzeci.pdf / Archive)
