= Chahar Borj (disambiguation) =

Chahar Borj is a city in West Azerbaijan Province, Iran.

Chahar Borj (Persian: چهاربرج) may also refer to:

- Chahar Borj, Dashtestan, Bushehr province
- Chahar Borj, Ganaveh, Bushehr province
- Chahar Borj, Fars
- Chahar Borj, Isfahan
- Chahar Borj, North Khorasan
- Chahar Borj, Mashhad, Razavi Khorasan province
- Chahar Borj-e Olya
- Chahar Borj-e Sofla
- Chaharborj County, West Azerbaijan province
