= Əsədli =

Əsədli or Asadly or Asatly may refer to:

- Əsədli, Jalilabad, Azerbaijan
- Əsədli, Sabirabad, Azerbaijan

== See also ==
- Asadli, Iran
