= Sheykh Teymur =

Sheykh Teymur (Persian: شيخ تيمور) may refer to:

- Sheykh Teymur, North Khorasan, Iran, a village
- Sheykh Teymur, West Azerbaijan, Iran, a village
