= Nargeslu =

Nargeslu (Persian: نرگسلو) may refer to:

- Nargeslu-ye Olya
- Nargeslu-ye Sofla
