= Esfidan =

Esfidan (Persian: اسفيدان) may refer to:

- Esfidan, Isfahan
- Esfidan, Bojnord, North Khorasan
- Esfidan, Maneh and Samalqan, North Khorasan
