= Sepidan =

Sepidan (Persian: سپیدان, which means "The Whiteland" in Persian) may refer to:

- Sepidan County, an administrative subdivision of Fars Province, Iran
- Ardakan, capital of Sepidan County, Fars Province, Iran
- Beyza, a city in Sepidan County, Fars Province, Iran
- Esfidan, village in Natanz County, Isfahan Province, Iran
