= Eltun =

Eltun is a given name. Notable people with the name include:

- Eltun Iskenderov (1990–2009), Azerbaijani border guard
- Eltun Turabov (born 1997), Azerbaijani footballer
- Eltun Yagublu (born 1991), Azerbaijani footballer

== See also ==
- Kefr Eltun, village in northwestern Syria
