= Khandaqlu =

Khandaqlu (Persian: خندقلو or خندق لو) may refer to:

- Khandaqlu, North Khorasan
- Khandaqlu, Zanjan
