= Iskenderov =

Iskenderov is a surname. Notable people with the surname include:

- Eltun Iskenderov (1990-2009), Azerbaijani border guard
- Mamed Iskenderov (1915–1985), Azerbaijani politician
