= Gerivan =

Village in North Khorasan province, Iran

Gerivan Persian: گريوان
- Village
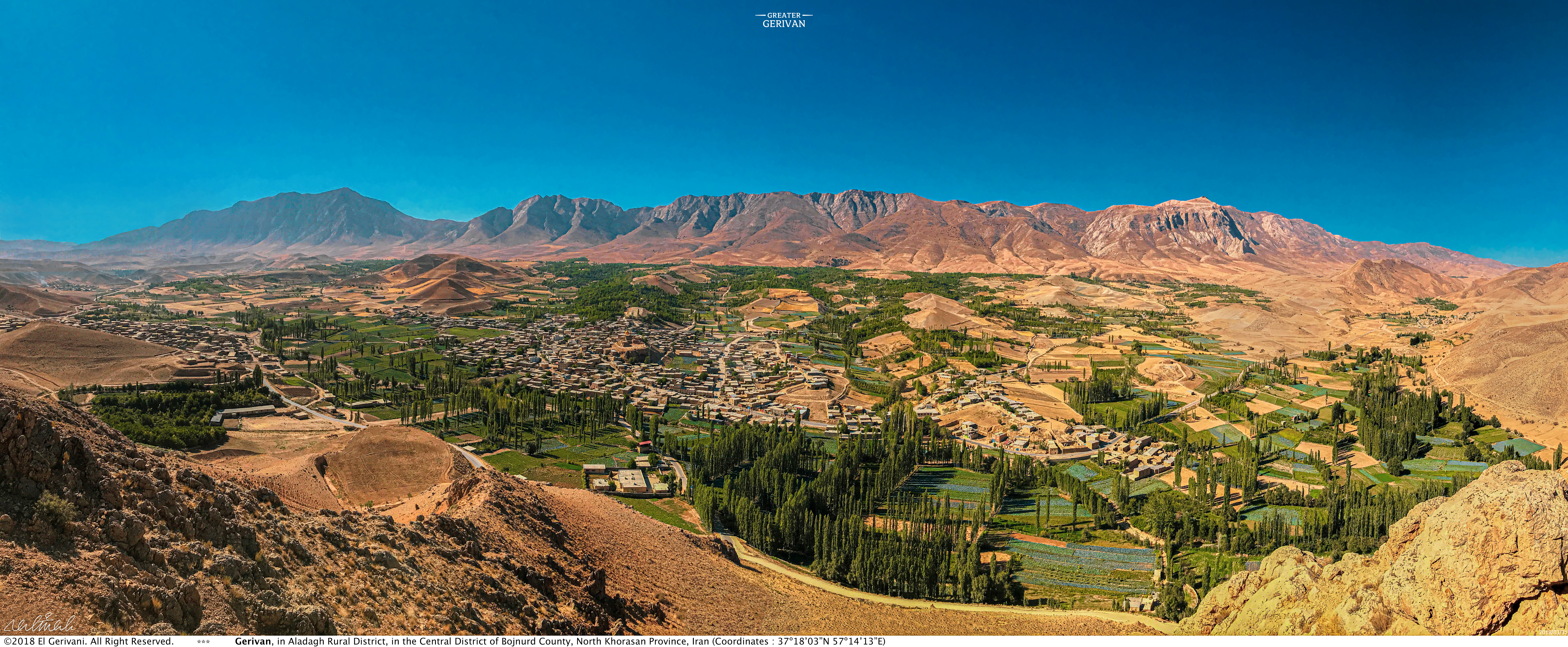
- The village of Gerivan

- Location within Iran
- Coordinates: 37°18′03″N 57°14′12″E
- Country: Iran
- Province: North Khorasan
- County: Bojnord
- District: Central
- Rural District: Aladagh

Population (2016)
  - Total: 2,433
- Time zone: UTC+3:30 (IRST)

Gerivan (Persian: گريوان) (Note: Also romanized as Gerīvān; also known as Girīvān) is a village in Aladagh Rural District of the Central District in Bojnord County, North Khorasan province, Iran.

== Etymology ==
Scattered and sometimes contradictory information has been provided regarding the origin of the name Gerivan. These categories of information are as follows:

- Some people believe that the root of the word Gerivan is "Gear" which is a Turkish word meaning "enter" with the suffix "van" meaning "abundance" and aesthetically in the word "Ke-ero" meaning " They have known "Merciful and Compassionate Friend" and as a result, Gerivan will mean "Land of the Merciful".
- Others believe that the name Gerivan is from the word "Gabrian"; Because in ancient Gerivan, people believed in Zoroastrianism (Gabr).
- In the image of Gerivan taken during the reign of Nasser al-Din Shah Qajar by the king photographer it is mentioned that the locals called Gerivan "Gervan". And that the word "Girish" is the root of the Turkish word "Gerivan" which means "The First".
- Another quotation that fits the culture of the last centuries of Gerivan analyzes the origin of this name as follows:
  In the popular local culture among the Turkic tribes living in the area, during celebrations, one of the relatives and close friends is chosen as "keriv". "Keriv" basically means "compassionate or kind"; And the word Gerivan is derived from this word. With this possibility the original name of Gerivan; "Kerivan" means the plural of "Keriv", meaning "the land of compassionate friends or the land of the kind". Later, "Kerivan" was changed to "Gerivan".
- Another possibility explaining the name of Gerivan is as follows:
  "Girioughan = Giriou + ghan" is a completely Turkish word from the source "Girmak = to enter" and means "leading" and "the first to enter" which due to the repetition and softening of the word "Girivghan" to "Girivan" And later became "Gerivan".
- Another theory that is mostly quoted by the Kurds of this region is that the name Gerivan is derived from the Kurdish word "Ger" meaning "great" with the suffix "Vena" meaning "them" as (the largest of them) because Gerivan is bigger than other villages in the area.
- Others have considered this word to be derived from Gevan(Astragalus) which is a kind of mountain plant in this area.
- Some have considered the word "Griveh" meaning the slope of the mountain as the origin of this name.
- In the Dehkhoda Dictionary, the word "Gerivan" is attributed to "Gariban", which generally means "poverty-stricken" or "poor-fellow".

== Demographics ==
=== Language ===
The people of Gerivan speak Khorasani Turkish.

=== Population ===
At the time of the 2006 National Census, the village's population was 2,204 in 590 households. The following census in 2011 counted 2,969 people in 908 households. The 2016 census measured the population of the village as 2,433 people in 765 households.

== Agriculture ==
Crops such as wheat, barley, chick peas, beans, lentils, potatoes, cabbage, squashes, carrots, and garlic are grown in Gerivan. Available garden products include cherries, walnuts, apples, pears, peaches, prunes, black plums, and black cherries. Pumpkins are a well-known symbol of Gerivan.

== Anthropology ==
Two kilometers from Gerivan is a hill called Emam Gholaghi. The archaeological sites there show the existence of a developed and prosperous village. This village had a water supply network allowing water consumption from the springs to be supplied by pottery pipes up to three kilometers to the south as far as Bande Jafar. Unfortunately the village was destroyed by an unknown event, possibly by a devastating earthquake. The few survivors migrated to the current location of Gerivan and settled on top of the hill.

After that, a group of Afshar Turks migrated to this place and settled on the eastern part of the hill. With the migration of Kurdish tribes to North Khorasan, a group of Kurds from the Chamshgazk tribe (Or Kurmanj, which is one of the Kurdish branches) In the western part of Gerivan hill, they settled in the place of Kalate Borj. Currently, the people of Gerivan speak Turkish. Many of the refugees now live in different cities of Iran, such as Bojnord, Mashhad, Isfahan, and Tehran.

== Tourist attractions ==
Sarcheshmeh of Gerivan, one of the main tourist attractions of the village, is one of the most abundant springs in Bojnord province. Its water is distributed among farmers through the use of waterways.
