= Allahverdi Khan (disambiguation) =

Allahverdi Khan (c. 1560 – 1613) was an Iranian general and statesman.

Allahverdi Khan may also refer to:

- Allahverdi Khan (Armenian)
- Allahverdi Khan Bridge
- Allah Verdi Khan
