= Cherik =

Cherik may refer to:

- Cherik, Iran
- Cherik, Kyrgyzstan
