= Atrabad =

Atrabad (Persian: اترابادعليا) may refer to:

- Atrabad-e Olya
- Atrabad-e Sofla
