= Sanjarabad =

Sanjarabad may refer to:

- Sanjarabad, North Khorasan
- Sanjarabad, Razavi Khorasan
