= Daraghanlu =

Daraghanlu دراغانلو
- Village
- Location within Iran
- Coordinates: 37°36′07″N 57°09′11″E
- Country: Iran
- Province: North Khorasan
- County: Bojnord
- Bakhsh: Central
- Rural District: Badranlu

Population (2006)
  - Total: 890
- Time zone: UTC+3:30 (IRST)
  - Summer (DST): UTC+4:30 (IRDT)

Daraghanlu (Persian: دراغانلو, also Romanized as Darāghānlū and Dorāqānlū; also known as Shahrak-e Shahīd Eḩsānī) is a village in Badranlu Rural District, in the Central District of Bojnord County, North Khorasan Province, Iran. At the 2006 census, its population was 890, in 211 families.
