= Kalateh-ye Baqerkhan Seh =

Village in North Khorasan province, Iran

Kalateh-ye Baqerkhan Seh Persian: كلاته باقرخان سه
- Village
- Location within Iran
- Coordinates: 37°29′49″N 57°21′39″E
- Country: Iran
- Province: North Khorasan
- County: Bojnord
- District: Central
- Rural District: Baba Aman

Population (2016)
  - Total: 3,173
- Time zone: UTC+3:30 (IRST)

Kalateh-ye Baqerkhan Seh (Persian: كلاته باقرخان سه) is a village in Baba Aman Rural District of the Central District in Bojnord County, North Khorasan province, Iran.

== Demographics ==
=== Population ===
At the time of the 2006 National Census, the village's population was 976 in 219 households. The following census in 2011 counted 2,502 people in 648 households. The 2016 census measured the population of the village as 3,173 people in 961 households, the most populous in its rural district.
