= Zavarom Rural District =

Rural district in North Khorasan province, Iran

Zavarom Rural District Persian: دهستان زوارم
- Rural District
- Location within Iran
- Coordinates: 37°20′N 57°46′E
- Country: Iran
- Province: North Khorasan
- County: Shirvan
- District: Central
- Established: 1987
- Capital: Zavarom

Population (2016)
  - Total: 6,484
- Time zone: UTC+3:30 (IRST)

Zavarom Rural District (Persian: دهستان زوارم) is in the Central District of Shirvan County, North Khorasan province, Iran. Its capital is the village of Zavarom.

== Demographics ==
=== Population ===
At the time of the 2006 National Census, the rural district's population was 7,174 in 1,773 households. There were 7,586 inhabitants in 2,095 households at the following census of 2011. The 2016 census measured the population of the rural district as 6,484 in 1,954 households. The most populous of its 10 villages was Hoseynabad, with 2,909 people.

=== Other villages in the rural district ===
- Abdabad
- Badamloq
- Fajrabad
- Khademi Fajrabad
- Qezel Hesar
- Shirabad
- Shurik-e Abdabad
- Varaqi
