= Yekkeh Shakh =

Yekkeh Shakh يكه شاخ
- Village
- Location within Iran
- Coordinates: 37°40′19″N 57°28′47″E
- Country: Iran
- Province: North Khorasan
- County: Bojnord
- Bakhsh: Garmkhan
- Rural District: Garmkhan

Population (2006)
  - Total: 153
- Time zone: UTC+3:30 (IRST)
  - Summer (DST): UTC+4:30 (IRDT)

Yekkeh Shakh (Persian: يكه شاخ, also Romanized as Yekkeh Shākh) is a village in Garmkhan Rural District, Garmkhan District, Bojnord County, North Khorasan Province, Iran. At the 2006 census, its population was 153, in 38 families.
