= Dehgah, North Khorasan =

Village in North Khorasan province, Iran

Dehgah Persian: دهگاه
- Village
- Location within Iran
- Coordinates: 37°29′28″N 57°04′18″E
- Country: Iran
- Province: North Khorasan
- County: Bojnord
- District: Central
- Rural District: Badranlu

Population (2016)
  - Total: 1,782
- Time zone: UTC+3:30 (IRST)

Dehgah (Persian: دهگاه) (Note: Also romanized as Dehgāh) is a village in Badranlu Rural District of the Central District in Bojnord County, North Khorasan province, Iran.

== Demographics ==
=== Population ===
At the time of the 2006 National Census, the village's population was 1,581 in 389 households. The following census in 2011 counted 1,766 people in 508 households. The 2016 census measured the population of the village as 1,782 people in 538 households.
