= Yengeh Qaleh, Bojnord =

Village in North Khorasan province, Iran

Yengeh Qaleh Persian: ينگه قلعه
- Village
- Location within Iran
- Coordinates: 37°27′49″N 57°22′23″E
- Country: Iran
- Province: North Khorasan
- County: Bojnord
- District: Central
- Rural District: Baba Aman

Population (2016)
  - Total: 2,933
- Time zone: UTC+3:30 (IRST)

Yengeh Qaleh (Persian: ينگه قلعه) (Note: Also romanized as Yengeh Qal‘eh; also known as Yengi Qaleh, also romanized as Yengī Qal‘eh) is a village in Baba Aman Rural District of the Central District in Bojnord County, North Khorasan province, Iran.

== Demographics ==
=== Population ===
At the time of the 2006 National Census, the village's population was 1,686 in 408 households. The following census in 2011 counted 2,483 people in 684 households. The 2016 census measured the population of the village as 2,933 people in 807 households.
