= Sar Cheshmeh, Bojnord =

Village in North Khorasan province, Iran

Sar Cheshmeh Persian: سرچشمه
- Village
- Location within Iran
- Coordinates: 37°32′12″N 57°29′33″E
- Country: Iran
- Province: North Khorasan
- County: Bojnord
- District: Garmkhan
- Rural District: Garmkhan

Population (2016)
  - Total: 600
- Time zone: UTC+3:30 (IRST)

Sar Cheshmeh (Persian: سرچشمه) is a village in Garmkhan Rural District of Garmkhan District in Bojnord County, North Khorasan province, Iran.

== Demographics ==
=== Population ===
At the time of the 2006 National Census, the village's population was 559 in 133 households. The following census in 2011 counted 622 people in 192 households. The 2016 census measured the population of the village as 600 people in 169 households.
