= Shurik-e Abdabad =

Village in North Khorasan province, Iran

Shurik-e Abdabad Persian: شوريك عبداباد
- Village
- Location within Iran
- Coordinates: 37°22′36″N 57°41′29″E
- Country: Iran
- Province: North Khorasan
- County: Shirvan
- District: Central
- Rural District: Zavarom

Population (2016)
  - Total: 212
- Time zone: UTC+3:30 (IRST)

Shurik-e Abdabad (Persian: شوريك عبداباد) (Note: Also romanized as Shūrīk-e ʿAbdābād) is a village in Zavarom Rural District of the Central District in Shirvan County, North Khorasan province, Iran.

== Demographics ==
=== Population ===
At the time of the 2006 National Census, the village's population was 361 in 76 households. The following census in 2011 counted 193 people in 61 households. The 2016 census measured the population of the village as 212 people in 61 households.
