= Qaleh Joq-e Bozorg =

Qaleh Joq-e Bozorg قلعه جق بزرگ
- Village
- Location within Iran
- Coordinates: 37°42′50″N 57°20′07″E
- Country: Iran
- Province: North Khorasan
- County: Bojnord
- Bakhsh: Garmkhan
- Rural District: Garmkhan

Population (2006)
  - Total: 54
- Time zone: UTC+3:30 (IRST)
  - Summer (DST): UTC+4:30 (IRDT)

Qaleh Joq-e Bozorg (Persian: قلعه جق بزرگ, also Romanized as Qal‘eh Joq-e Bozorg and Qal‘eh Jaq-e Bozorg; also known as Qal‘eh Jūq-e Bozorg and Qal‘eh Joq-e Jadīd) is a village in Garmkhan Rural District, Garmkhan District, Bojnord County, North Khorasan Province, Iran. At the 2006 census, its population was 54, in 12 families.
