= Şirvan, Azerbaijan =

City in central Azerbaijan

Shirvan Şirvan
- City
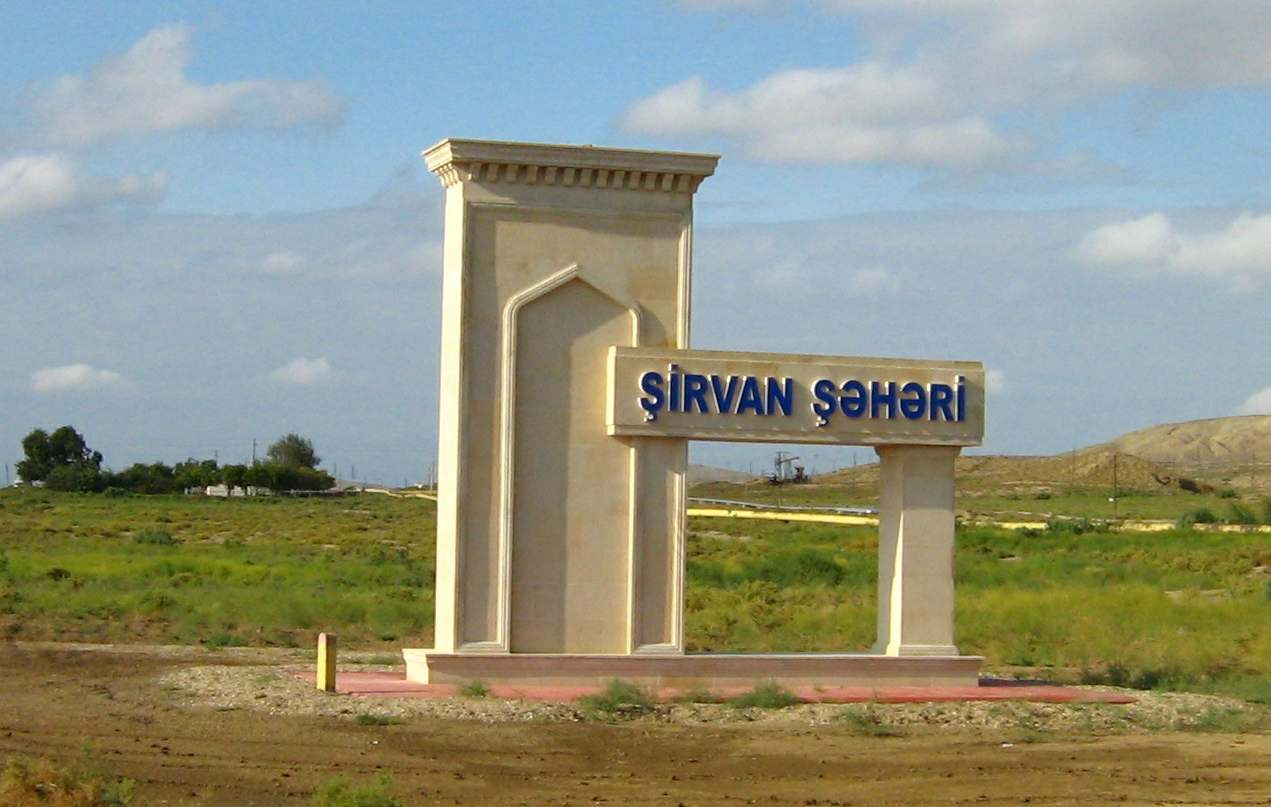
- Road sign at the entrance to Shirvan city

- Map of Azerbaijan showing Shirvan
- Coordinates: 39°55′55″N 48°55′13″E
- Country: Azerbaijan
- Region: Shirvan-Salyan

Government
  - Governor: Ilqar Abbasov

Area
  - Total: 72.7 km^{2} (28.1 sq mi)
- Elevation: 12 m (39 ft)

Population (2020)
  - Total: 87,400
  - Density: 1,200/km^{2} (3,110/sq mi)
- Time zone: UTC+4 (AZT)
- Website: shirvan-ih.gov.az

Shirvan (Azerbaijani: Şirvan) is a city in Azerbaijan, located on the Kura River. It was called Zubovka until 1938 and Ali Bayramli until 2008. From 1938 to 1954, Shirvan was a village. It was granted city status on January 4, 1963. The territory of Shirvan is 72.7 km^{2}, and the population is 87,400 according to the 2020 census. Population density is 1226 persons per 1 km^{2}. The city also includes the settlement of Hajigarahmanly and Bairamly. 98.5% of the population are Azerbaijani, while others - Russians, Ukrainians, Tatars, Turks, and other natives.

== History ==
Shirvan originally was the name of a region in the South Caucasus. But the city of Shirvan originated in the 19th century as the Russian village of Zubovka, named in honor of Valerian Zubov, while it was known locally as Qarachukhar. Throughout history, Şirvan changed its name a few times.

In 1796, a special military squad led by General Zubov entered Azerbaijan. Catherine II showed great interest in this march. 30 thousand troops were given to General Zubov's army. The rally began in St. Petersburg in the church, and the priests blessed the supreme commander and the Russian-Cossack forces.

General Zubov, who successfully progressed in Azerbaijan, named the village Yekaterinaserd. Two thousand Russian Kazaks were transferred here as the first event. They were equipped with military and agricultural tools. They would plant or harvest crops and caterpillars, and they would use the weapon as they wanted.

The city was called Zubovka before 1938, then was renamed Ali Bayramli in honor of Ali Bayramov from 1938 to 2008.

The city was renamed to 'Şirvan' by the decision of the Parliament of Azerbaijan on April 25, 2008. 'Shirvan' appears to be derived from Shīr (Persian: شیر, 'Lion').

Throughout its history, Shirvan has suffered from floods because of its proximity to the river and the relatively low elevation of most of the town.

== Economy ==
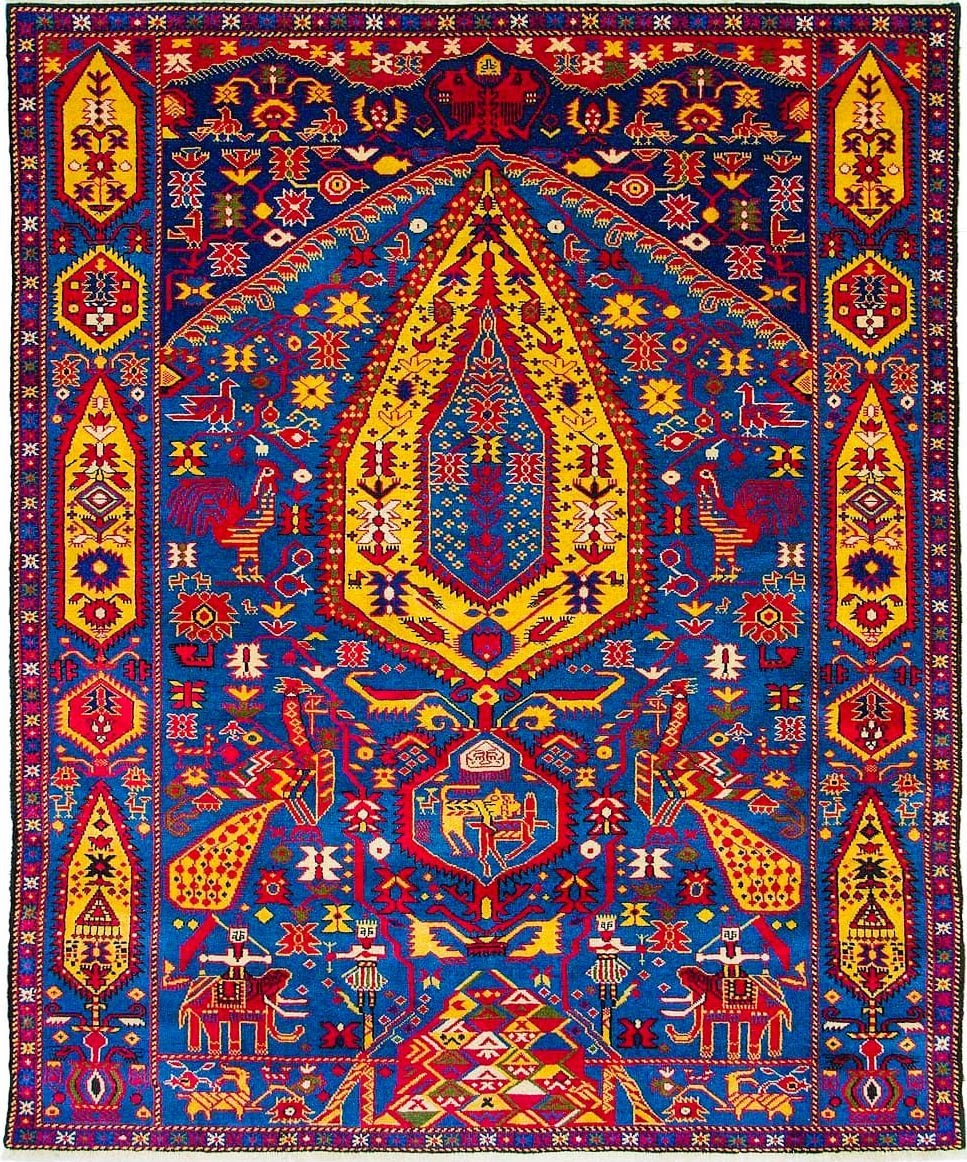
Carpets of Şirvan

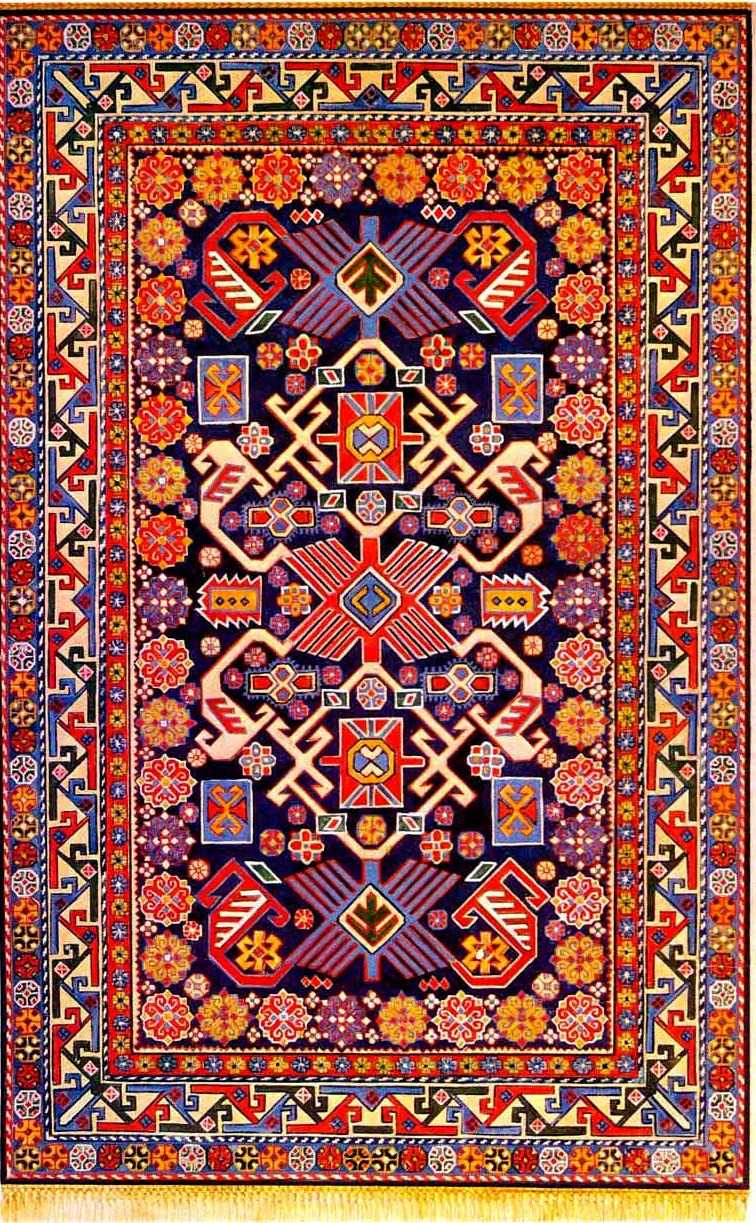
Carpets of Şirvan

Timurid mausoleum of Shirvan The city is the oil center of the Shirvan region, which at one time gave a significant part of the liquid fuel produced onshore. Engineering enterprises, the light and food industry have been developed in the city. In addition, the railway junction passes through the city.

Oil and gas production and the fuel and energy complex as a whole have been and remain the basis of the city's economy. As before, today about 90% of the gross output in the city falls to this industry.

== Archeological excavations ==
The archaeological samples found near the town testify to the settlement of these lands in ancient times. On the territory on which Shirvan is located, once passed caravan routes. During archaeological excavations in 2 km from the city, in the lower part of Mishovdag, the remains of a 14th-century urban settlement were discovered. Found in the craft districts of this city, 12 pottery furnaces have been preserved in very good condition. Also, here were found various objects of everyday life, and ornaments of folk crafts, carpet weaving, stone carvings and jewellery craft were preserved.

== Geography ==
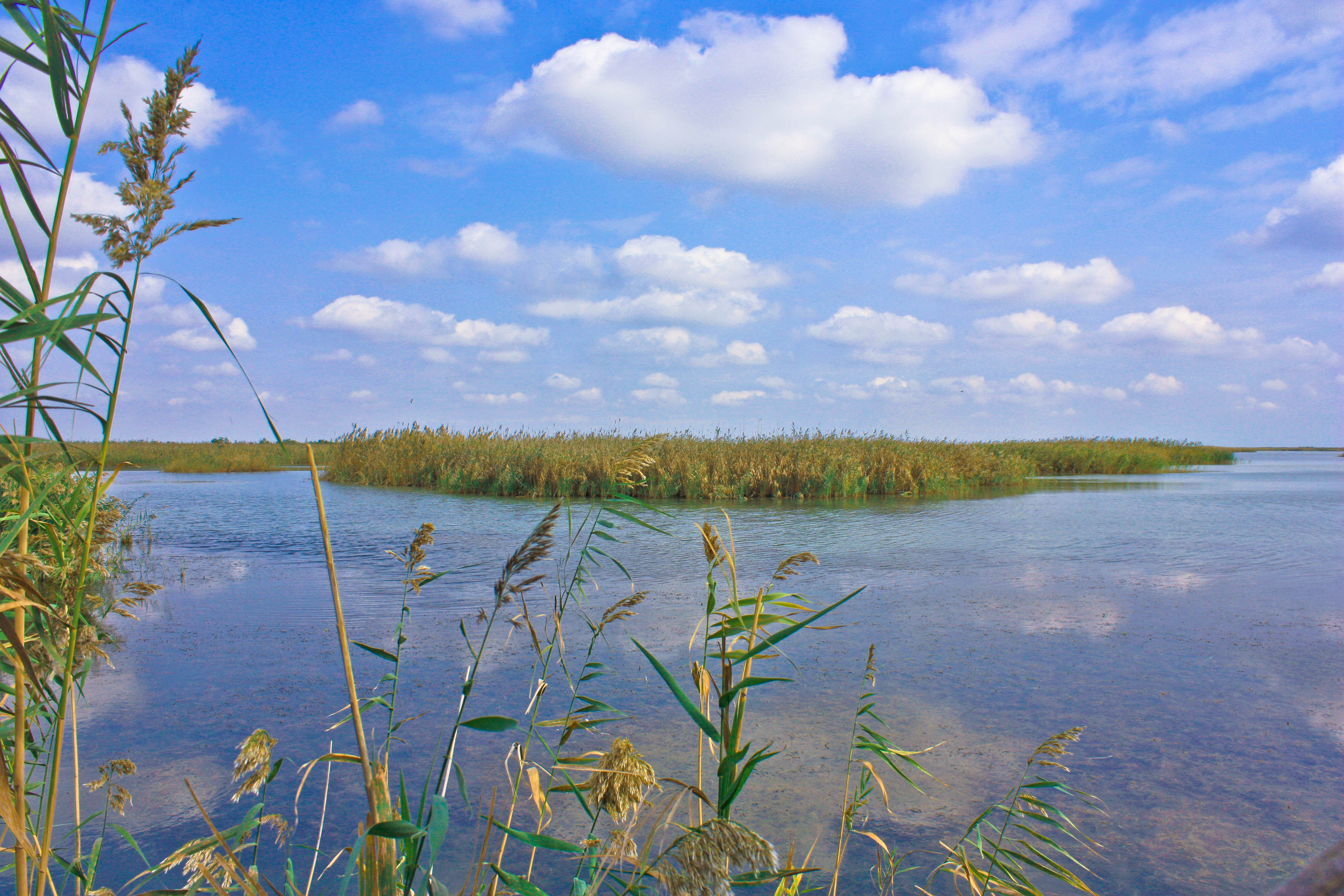
Shirvan National Park

Shirvan is located on the left bank of the river Kura, on the Shirvan plain, on the transport junction. The largest in Europe, Shirvan GRES is open in the city. The Shirvan Children's Music School has existed for more than 40 years. Situated in the east of the Kura lowland, on the left bank of the Kura, the young city of Shirvan was founded in 1954 in connection with the discovery of the Kurovdag oil field.

=== Climate ===
The summer months are typically dry and very hot due to Şirvan's semi-desert climate. The temperature can rise to 44 °C often resulting in moderate drought conditions. In contrast, winter is cool but not severe, rarely going below -6 °C.

Weather, climate, temperature for months in Shirvan (Ali Bayramli)
Season		Autumn			Winter			Spring			Summer	
Month		Sep	Oct	Nov	Dec	Jan	Feb	Mar	Apr	May	Jun	Jul
Average maximum	°C	26	19	13	8	6	7	11	18	23	28	31
Average temperature	°C	22	16	12	6	4	4	7	14	19	24	27
Average minimum	°C	17	11	6	2	-1	0	3	9	13	18	21
Fog	Days	0	0	1	0	9	7	2	0	0	0	0
Precipitation level	mm	17	37	33	25	23	40	32	33	28	20	5
Humidity	%	69	77	68	76	78	80	74	70	66	61	57
Wind	km/h	8	8	8	8	9	9	9	9	9	8	8
Longitude of the day	hours	13	12	11	10	10	11	12	12	15	16	15
Dew point	°C	16	12	6	2	0	1	3	8	13	16	18
Sum of active temperatures	°C	369	186	66	0	0	0	0	117	279	417	521
Solar radiation	Mj/m^{2}	15	10	7	6	7	10	13	17	20	22	2

== Administrative divisions ==
The municipality of Shirvan consists of the city of Shirvan and the municipalities of Bayramli, Chilpagly and Haji Gahramanly. The mayor, presently Mardan Jamalov, embodies the executive power of the city.

== Demographics ==
According to the State Statistics Committee, as of 2018, the population of city recorded 85,800 persons, which increased by 16,800 persons (about 24.3 percent) from 69,000 persons in 2000. Of the total population, 42,100 are men and 43,700 are women. More than 27,3 percent of the population (about 23,500 persons) consists of young people and teenagers aged 14–29.

The population of the district by the year (at the beginning of the year, thsd. persons)
Territory	2000	2001	2002	2003	2004	2005	2006	2007	2008	2009	2010	2011	2012	2013	2014	2015	2016	2017	2018
Shirvan town	69.0	69.1	69.4	69.5	70.5	71.0	71.5	72.9	73.8	74.8	75.7	76.8	78.7	80.9	81.8	82.9	84.0	85.0	85.8

=== Population ===
- Population 85,800
- Azerbaijanis 68.652 (99.7%)
- Meskhetian Turks 207 (0.3%)

== Notable residents ==
The city's residents include: historian Farida Mammadova, footballer Samadagha Shikhlarov and dancer Oksana Rasulova.

== See also ==
- Shirvan
- Şirvan, Turkey
- Shirvan, Iran
- Shirvan State Reserve
- Administrative divisions of Azerbaijan
