= Qezelqan =

Qezelqan قزلقان
- Village
- Location within Iran
- Coordinates: 37°39′45″N 57°25′15″E
- Country: Iran
- Province: North Khorasan
- County: Bojnord
- Bakhsh: Garmkhan
- Rural District: Garmkhan

Population (2006)
  - Total: 314
- Time zone: UTC+3:30 (IRST)
  - Summer (DST): UTC+4:30 (IRDT)

Qezelqan (Persian: قزلقان, also Romanized as Qezelqān and Qeselqān) is a village in Garmkhan Rural District, Garmkhan District, Bojnord County, North Khorasan Province, Iran. At the 2006 census, its population was 314, in 68 families.
