= Qarah Jangal-e Olya =

Qarah Jangal-e Olya قره جنگل عليا
- Village
- Location within Iran
- Coordinates: 37°37′00″N 57°10′00″E
- Country: Iran
- Province: North Khorasan
- County: Bojnord
- Bakhsh: Central
- Rural District: Badranlu

Population (2006)
  - Total: 248
- Time zone: UTC+3:30 (IRST)
  - Summer (DST): UTC+4:30 (IRDT)

Qarah Jangal-e Olya (Persian: قره جنگل عليا, also Romanized as Qarah Jangal-e ‘Olyā; also known as Qarah Jangal-e Bālā) is a village in Badranlu Rural District, in the Central District of Bojnord County, North Khorasan Province, Iran. With knowledge of the 2006 census, its population was 248, in 51 families.
