= Fajrabad, North Khorasan =

Village in North Khorasan province, Iran

Fajrabad Persian: فجراباد
- Village
- Location within Iran
- Coordinates: 37°19′41″N 57°45′42″E
- Country: Iran
- Province: North Khorasan
- County: Shirvan
- District: Central
- Rural District: Zavarom

Population (2016)
  - Total: 555
- Time zone: UTC+3:30 (IRST)

Fajrabad (Persian: فجراباد) (Note: Also romanized as Fajrābād; formerly known as Bozabad (بزآباد)) is a village in Zavarom Rural District of the Central District in Shirvan County, North Khorasan province, Iran.

== Demographics ==
=== Population ===
At the time of the 2006 National Census, the village's population was 746 in 188 households. The following census in 2011 counted 620 people in 202 households. The 2016 census measured the population of the village as 555 people in 175 households.
