= Qaleh-ye Tut =

Qaleh-ye Tut قلعه توت
- Village
- Location within Iran
- Coordinates: 37°31′00″N 57°05′00″E
- Country: Iran
- Province: North Khorasan
- County: Bojnord
- Bakhsh: Central
- Rural District: Badranlu

Population (2006)
  - Total: 151
- Time zone: UTC+3:30 (IRST)
  - Summer (DST): UTC+4:30 (IRDT)

Qaleh-ye Tut (Persian: قلعه توت, also Romanized as Qal‘eh-ye Tūt) is a village in Badranlu Rural District, in the Central District of Bojnord County, North Khorasan Province, Iran. At the 2006 census, its population was 151, in 42 families.
