= Hacıqəhrəmanlı =

- Municipality
- Location within Azerbaijan
- Coordinates: 39°52′42″N 48°55′16″E
- Country: Azerbaijan
- City: Shirvan

Population
  - Total: 2,600
- Time zone: UTC+4 (AZT)

Hacıqəhrəmanlı (also, Gadzhi-Kakhyrmanly, Gadzhykagramanly, and Gadzhykakhramanly) is a village and municipality in Shirvan, Azerbaijan. It has a population of 2,600.
