= Aliabad, Bojnord =

Village in North Khorasan province, Iran

Aliabad Persian: علي اباد
- Village
- Location within Iran
- Coordinates: 37°31′35″N 57°20′45″E
- Country: Iran
- Province: North Khorasan
- County: Bojnord
- District: Central
- Rural District: Baba Aman

Population (2016)
  - Total: 1,546
- Time zone: UTC+3:30 (IRST)

Aliabad (Persian: علي اباد) (Note: Also romanized as ‘Alīābād) is a village in Baba Aman Rural District of the Central District in Bojnord County, North Khorasan province, Iran.

== Demographics ==
=== Population ===
At the time of the 2006 National Census, the village's population was 1,097 in 283 households. The following census in 2011 counted 1,570 people in 434 households. The 2016 census measured the population of the village as 1,546 people in 445 households.
