= Kalateh-ye Aqa Nabi =

Kalateh-ye Aqa Nabi کلاته آقانبی
- Village
- Location within Iran
- Coordinates: 37°35′09″N 57°05′37″E
- Country: Iran
- Province: North Khorasan
- County: Bojnord
- Bakhsh: Central
- Rural District: Badranlu

Population (2006)
  - Total: 338
- Time zone: UTC+3:30 (IRST)
  - Summer (DST): UTC+4:30 (IRDT)

Kalateh-ye Aqa Nabi (Persian: کلاته آقانبی, also Romanized as Kalāteh-ye Āqā Nabī) is a village in Badranlu Rural District, in the Central District of Bojnord County, North Khorasan Province, Iran. At the 2006 census, its population was 338, in 84 families.
