= Pighur =

Village in North Khorasan province, Iran

Pighur Persian: پيغور
- Village
- Location within Iran
- Coordinates: 37°25′02″N 57°28′18″E
- Country: Iran
- Province: North Khorasan
- County: Bojnord
- District: Central
- Rural District: Baba Aman

Population (2016)
  - Total: 567
- Time zone: UTC+3:30 (IRST)

Pighur (Persian: پیغو) (Note: Also romanized as Pīghūr; also known as Pīghū and Pīqū) is a village in Baba Aman Rural District of the Central District in Bojnord County, North Khorasan province, Iran.

== Demographics ==
=== Population ===
At the time of the 2006 National Census, the village's population was 596 in 140 households. The following census in 2011 counted 593 people in 155 households. The 2016 census measured the population of the village as 567 people in 155 households.
