= Abdabad, North Khorasan =

Village in North Khorasan province, Iran

Abdabad Persian: عبداباد
- Village
- Location within Iran
- Coordinates: 37°23′14″N 57°44′32″E
- Country: Iran
- Province: North Khorasan
- County: Shirvan
- District: Central
- Rural District: Zavarom

Population (2016)
  - Total: 689
- Time zone: UTC+3:30 (IRST)

Abdabad (Persian: عبداباد) (Note: Also romanized as ‘Abdābād) is a village in Zavarom Rural District of the Central District in Shirvan County, North Khorasan province, Iran.

== Demographics ==
=== Population ===
At the time of the 2006 National Census, the village's population was 907 in 213 households. The following census in 2011 counted 910 people in 259 households. The 2016 census measured the population of the village as 689 people in 220 households.
