= Rashvanlu, Bojnord =

Rashvanlu رشوانلو
- Village
- Location within Iran
- Coordinates: 37°25′11″N 57°20′43″E
- Country: Iran
- Province: North Khorasan
- County: Bojnord
- Bakhsh: Central
- Rural District: Aladagh

Population (2006)
  - Total: 160
- Time zone: UTC+3:30 (IRST)
  - Summer (DST): UTC+4:30 (IRDT)

Rashvanlu (Persian: رشوانلو, also Romanized as Rashvānlū) is a village in Aladagh Rural District, in the Central District of Bojnord County, North Khorasan Province, Iran. At the 2006 census, its population was 160, in 42 families.
