= Arkan, North Khorasan =

Village in North Khorasan province, Iran

Arkan Persian: اركان
- Village
- Location within Iran
- Coordinates: 37°24′46″N 57°09′55″E
- Country: Iran
- Province: North Khorasan
- County: Bojnord
- District: Central
- Rural District: Aladagh

Population (2016)
  - Total: 3,173
- Time zone: UTC+3:30 (IRST)

Arkan (Persian: اركان) (Note: Also romanized as Arkān) is a village in Aladagh Rural District of the Central District in Bojnord County, North Khorasan province, Iran.

== Demographics ==
=== Language ===
The local language is Turkmen.

=== Population ===
At the time of the 2006 National Census, the village's population was 2,783 in 680 households. The following census in 2011 counted 3,109 people in 880 households. The 2016 census measured the population of the village as 3,173 people in 924 households.
