= Khush Manzar =

Village in North Khorasan province, Iran

Khush Manzar Persian: خوش منظر
- Village
- Location within Iran
- Coordinates: 37°24′39″N 57°17′25″E
- Country: Iran
- Province: North Khorasan
- County: Bojnord
- District: Central
- Rural District: Aladagh

Population (2016)
  - Total: 237
- Time zone: UTC+3:30 (IRST)

Khush Manzar (Persian: خوش منظر) (Note: Also romanized as Khūsh Manẓar) is a village in, and the capital of, Aladagh Rural District in the Central District of Bojnord County, North Khorasan province, Iran.

== Demographics ==
=== Population ===
At the time of the 2006 National Census, the village's population was 247 in 60 households. The following census in 2011 counted 240 people in 60 households. The 2016 census measured the population of the village as 237 people in 70 households.
