= Taraqi Tork =

Village in North Khorasan province, Iran

Taraqi Tork Persian: طراقي ترك
- Village
- Location within Iran
- Coordinates: 37°23′21″N 57°30′54″E
- Country: Iran
- Province: North Khorasan
- County: Bojnord
- District: Central
- Rural District: Baba Aman

Population (2016)
  - Total: 926
- Time zone: UTC+3:30 (IRST)

Taraqi Tork (Persian: طراقي ترك) (Note: Also romanized as Ţarāqī Tork; also known as Tarāqān) is a village in Baba Aman Rural District of the Central District in Bojnord County, North Khorasan province, Iran.

== Demographics ==
=== Population ===
At the time of the 2006 National Census, the village's population was 939 in 203 households. The following census in 2011 counted 1,012 people in 250 households. The 2016 census measured the population of the village as 926 people in 243 households.
