= Oksana Rasulova =

Azerbaijani dancer, choreographer and actress

- Oksana Rəsulova
- Born: 19 December 1982 (age 43); Şirvan, Azerbaijani SSR, USSR
- Occupations: Dancer, actress, choreographer
- Years active: 1990 – present

Oksana Rasulova (Azerbaijani: Oksana Rəsulova; born 19 December 1982) is an Azerbaijani dancer, choreographer and actress. She is an Indian classical dancer, including Bharatanatyam.

== Early life ==
Rasulova was born in Shabran, Azerbaijani SSR. In her childhood, she moved with her family to Russia, where she started to learn Bharata Natyam.

== Career ==
In 2001, she created "Chandra Muthi" dance group and started to work as a choreographer.

In 2014, she was featured and won Zee TV's India's Best Cinestars Ki Khoj, a talent show for aspiring actors. She was often compared, for her striking resemblance, to the Indian actress Preity Zinta. And also won it along with Syed Mamoon in season 3. In the same year, she was awarded "Goddess of dance" statuette prize by Indian Embassy in Azerbaijan.

== Personal life ==
She speaks fluent along with her native Azerbaijani and Russian.

== Filmography ==
Film	Year	Role	Language
When Darkness Falls	2016	Aida	Azerbaijani
Zaman Adli Qatar	2016		Azerbaijani
The Festive Evening	2017	Fira	Azerbaijani
The Kiss Of Angel	2017		Azerbaijani
Qaraqoz	2018		Azerbaijani
Love Romance	2019	Cemile	Azerbaijani
