= Shaqeh =

Village in North Khorasan province, Iran

Shaqeh Persian: شاقه
- Village
- Country: Iran
- Province: North Khorasan
- County: Bojnord
- District: Central
- Rural District: Baba Aman

Population (2016)
  - Total: 0
- Time zone: UTC+3:30 (IRST)

Shaqeh (Persian: شاقه) (Note: Also romanized as Shāqeh) is a village in Baba Aman Rural District of the Central District in Bojnord County, North Khorasan province, Iran.

== Demographics ==
=== Population ===
At the time of the 2006 National Census, the village's population was 15 in seven households. The village did not appear in the following census of 2011. The 2016 census measured the population of the village as zero.
