= Serivan Tappeh =

Village in North Khorasan, Iran

Serivan Tappeh سريوان تپه
- Village
- Location within Iran
- Coordinates: 37°34′37″N 57°03′25″E
- Country: Iran
- Province: North Khorasan
- County: Bojnord
- Bakhsh: Central
- Rural District: Badranlu

Population (2006)
  - Total: 32
- Time zone: UTC+3:30 (IRST)
  - Summer (DST): UTC+4:30 (IRDT)

Serivan Tappeh (Persian: سريوان تپه, also Romanized as Serīvān Tappeh) is a village in Badranlu Rural District, in the Central District of Bojnord County, North Khorasan Province, Iran. At the 2006 census, its population was 32, in 10 families.
