= Kalateh-ye Naqi =

Kalateh-ye Naqi کلاته نقی
- Village
- Location within Iran
- Coordinates: 37°23′05″N 57°17′06″E
- Country: Iran
- Province: North Khorasan
- County: Bojnord
- Bakhsh: Central
- Rural District: Aladagh

Population (2006)
  - Total: 505
- Time zone: UTC+3:30 (IRST)
  - Summer (DST): UTC+4:30 (IRDT)

Kalateh-ye Naqi (Persian: کلاته نقی, also Romanized as Kalāteh-ye Naqī) is a village in Aladagh Rural District, in the Central District of Bojnord County, North Khorasan Province, Iran. At the 2006 census, its population was 505, in 142 families.
