= Baba Aman Rural District =

Rural district in North Khorasan province, Iran

Baba Aman Rural District Persian: دهستان باباامان
- Rural District
- Location within Iran
- Coordinates: 37°28′N 57°24′E
- Country: Iran
- Province: North Khorasan
- County: Bojnord
- District: Central
- Established: 1987
- Capital: Baba Aman

Population (2016)
  - Total: 15,609
- Time zone: UTC+3:30 (IRST)

Baba Aman Rural District (Persian: دهستان باباامان) is in the Central District of Bojnord County, North Khorasan province, Iran. Its capital is the village of Baba Aman. The previous capital of the rural district was the village of Hesar-e Garmkhan, now a city.

== Demographics ==
=== Population ===
At the time of the 2006 National Census, the rural district's population was 19,323 in 4,540 households. There were 24,187 inhabitants in 6,449 households at the following census of 2011. The 2016 census measured the population of the rural district as 15,609 in 4,381 households. The most populous of its 16 villages was Kalateh-ye Baqerkhan Seh, with 3,173 people.

=== Other villages in the rural district ===
- Aliabad
- Baghcheq
- Chahar Kharvar
- Hamid
- Jammi
- Kalateh-ye Ashian
- Kuh Kamar
- Mohammadabad
- Pighur
- Shaqeh
- Taraqi Tork
- Yengeh Qaleh
