= Sisab =

Sisab سيساب
- Village
- Location within Iran
- Coordinates: 37°27′21″N 57°39′24″E
- Country: Iran
- Province: North Khorasan
- County: Bojnord
- Bakhsh: Garmkhan
- Rural District: Garmkhan

Population (2006)
  - Total: 572
- Time zone: UTC+3:30 (IRST)
  - Summer (DST): UTC+4:30 (IRDT)

Sisab (Persian: سيساب, also Romanized as Sīsāb) is a village in Garmkhan Rural District, Garmkhan District, Bojnord County, North Khorasan Province, Iran. At the 2006 census, its population was 572, in 142 families.
