= Khademi Fajrabad =

Village in North Khorasan province, Iran

Khademi Fajrabad Persian: خادمي فجراباد
- Village
- Location within Iran
- Coordinates: 37°19′51″N 57°46′32″E
- Country: Iran
- Province: North Khorasan
- County: Shirvan
- District: Central
- Rural District: Zavarom

Population (2016)
  - Total: 101
- Time zone: UTC+3:30 (IRST)

Khademi Fajrabad (Persian: خادمي فجراباد) (Note: Also romanized as Khādamī Fajrābād and Khādemī Fajrābād) is a village in Zavarom Rural District of the Central District in Shirvan County, North Khorasan province, Iran.

== Demographics ==
=== Population ===
At the time of the 2006 National Census, the village's population was 152 in 39 households. The following census in 2011 counted 160 people in 49 households. The 2016 census measured the population of the village as 101 people in 34 households.
