= Mohammadabad, Bojnord =

Village in North Khorasan province, Iran

Mohammadabad Persian: محمداباد
- Village
- Country: Iran
- Province: North Khorasan
- County: Bojnord
- District: Central
- Rural District: Baba Aman

Population (2011)
  - Total: 5,976
- Time zone: UTC+3:30 (IRST)

Mohammadabad (Persian: محمداباد) (Note: Also romanized as Moḩammadābād) is a village in Baba Aman Rural District of the Central District in Bojnord County, North Khorasan province, Iran.

== Demographics ==
=== Population ===
At the time of the 2006 National Census, the village's population was 4,368 in 1,002 households. The following census in 2011 counted 5,976 people in 1,585 households. The village did not appear in the 2016 census.
