= Goli, North Khorasan =

Village in North Khorasan province, Iran

Goli Persian: گلي
- Village
- Location within Iran
- Coordinates: 37°30′24″N 57°07′51″E
- Country: Iran
- Province: North Khorasan
- County: Bojnord
- District: Central
- Rural District: Badranlu

Population (2016)
  - Total: 1,069
- Time zone: UTC+3:30 (IRST)

Goli (Persian: گلي) (Note: Also romanized as Golī) is a village in Badranlu Rural District of the Central District in Bojnord County, North Khorasan province, Iran.

== Demographics ==
=== Population ===
At the time of the 2006 National Census, the village's population was 1,222 in 318 households. The following census in 2011 counted 1,297 people in 382 households. The 2016 census measured the population of the village as 1,069 people in 331 households.
