= Owzan Bijeh =

Owzan Bijeh اوزن بيجه
- Village
- Location within Iran
- Coordinates: 37°32′45″N 57°27′46″E
- Country: Iran
- Province: North Khorasan
- County: Bojnord
- Bakhsh: Garmkhan
- Rural District: Garmkhan

Population (2006)
  - Total: 297
- Time zone: UTC+3:30 (IRST)
  - Summer (DST): UTC+4:30 (IRDT)

Owzan Bijeh (Persian: اوزن بيجه, also Romanized as Owzan Bījeh, Ozūnbījeh, Uzunbījeh, Ūzūn Bījeh, and Vazan Bījeh) is a village in Garmkhan Rural District, Garmkhan District, Bojnord County, North Khorasan Province, Iran. At the 2006 census, its population was 297, in 77 families.
