= Varaqi =

Village in North Khorasan province, Iran

Varaqi Persian: ورقي
- Village
- Location within Iran
- Coordinates: 37°21′59″N 57°45′34″E
- Country: Iran
- Province: North Khorasan
- County: Shirvan
- District: Central
- Rural District: Zavarom

Population (2016)
  - Total: 201
- Time zone: UTC+3:30 (IRST)

Varaqi (Persian: ورقي) (Note: Also romanized as Varaqī) is a village in Zavarom Rural District of the Central District in Shirvan County, North Khorasan province, Iran.

== Demographics ==
=== Population ===
At the time of the 2006 National Census, the village's population was 301 in 72 households. The following census in 2011 counted 242 people in 73 households. The 2016 census measured the population of the village as 201 people in 65 households.
