= Langar, Bojnord =

Langar لنگر
- Village
- Location within Iran
- Coordinates: 37°33′04″N 57°14′42″E
- Country: Iran
- Province: North Khorasan
- County: Bojnord
- Bakhsh: Central
- Rural District: Badranlu

Population (2006)
  - Total: 786
- Time zone: UTC+3:30 (IRST)
  - Summer (DST): UTC+4:30 (IRDT)

Langar (Persian: لنگر) is a village in Badranlu Rural District, in the Central District of Bojnord County, North Khorasan Province, Iran. At the 2006 census, its population was 786, in 223 families.
