= Qaleh Shaban =

Qaleh Shaban قلعه شعبان
- Village
- Location within Iran
- Coordinates: 37°37′52″N 57°10′51″E
- Country: Iran
- Province: North Khorasan
- County: Bojnord
- Bakhsh: Central
- Rural District: Badranlu

Population (2006)
  - Total: 259
- Time zone: UTC+3:30 (IRST)
  - Summer (DST): UTC+4:30 (IRDT)

Qaleh Shaban (Persian: قلعه شعبان, also Romanized as Qal‘eh Sha‘ban; also known as Kalāteh-ye Sha‘bān, Kalāteh-ye Sha‘ban, and Tānīr Lū) is a village in Badranlu Rural District, in the Central District of Bojnord County, North Khorasan Province, Iran. At the 2006 census, its population was 259, in 61 families.
