= Shirabad, Shirvan =

Village in North Khorasan province, Iran

Shirabad Persian: شيراباد
- Village
- Location within Iran
- Coordinates: 37°22′08″N 57°45′08″E
- Country: Iran
- Province: North Khorasan
- County: Shirvan
- District: Central
- Rural District: Zavarom

Population (2016)
  - Total: 66
- Time zone: UTC+3:30 (IRST)

Shirabad (Persian: شيراباد) (Note: Also romanized as Shīrābād) is a village in Zavarom Rural District of the Central District in Shirvan County, North Khorasan province, Iran.

== Demographics ==
=== Population ===
At the time of the 2006 National Census, the village's population was 58 in 17 households. The following census in 2011 counted 75 people in 22 households. The 2016 census measured the population of the village as 66 people in 20 households.
