= Qarah Bashlu =

Qarah Bashlu قره باشلو
- Village
- Location within Iran
- Coordinates: 37°22′32″N 57°16′51″E
- Country: Iran
- Province: North Khorasan
- County: Bojnord
- Bakhsh: Central
- Rural District: Aladagh

Population (2006)
  - Total: 199
- Time zone: UTC+3:30 (IRST)
  - Summer (DST): UTC+4:30 (IRDT)

Qarah Bashlu (Persian: قره باشلو, also Romanized as Qarah Bāshlū and Qareh Bāshlū) is a village in Aladagh Rural District, in the Central District of Bojnord County, North Khorasan Province, Iran. In 2006, its population was 199, in 52 families.
