= Atrabad-e Sofla =

Atrabad-e Sofla اترابادسفلي
- Village
- Country: Iran
- Province: North Khorasan
- County: Bojnord
- Bakhsh: Central
- Rural District: Badranlu

Population (2006)
  - Total: 17
- Time zone: UTC+3:30 (IRST)
  - Summer (DST): UTC+4:30 (IRDT)

Atrabad-e Sofla (Persian: اترابادسفلي, also Romanized as Ātrābād-e Soflá) is a village in Badranlu Rural District, in the Central District of Bojnord County, North Khorasan Province, Iran. At the 2006 census, its population was 17, in 6 families.
