= Hamzanlu =

Hamzanlu حمزانلو
- Village
- Location within Iran
- Coordinates: 37°26′03″N 57°20′28″E
- Country: Iran
- Province: North Khorasan
- County: Bojnord
- Bakhsh: Central
- Rural District: Aladagh

Population (2006)
  - Total: 417
- Time zone: UTC+3:30 (IRST)
  - Summer (DST): UTC+4:30 (IRDT)

Hamzanlu (Persian: حمزانلو, also Romanized as Ḩamzānlū) is a village in Aladagh Rural District, in the Central District of Bojnord County, North Khorasan Province, Iran. At the 2006 census, its population was 417, in 102 families.
