= Hoseynabad, North Khorasan =

Village in North Khorasan province, Iran

Hoseynabad Persian: حسين اباد
- Village
- Location within Iran
- Coordinates: 37°24′05″N 57°49′41″E
- Country: Iran
- Province: North Khorasan
- County: Shirvan
- District: Central
- Rural District: Zavarom

Population (2016)
  - Total: 2,909
- Time zone: UTC+3:30 (IRST)

Hoseynabad (Persian: حسين اباد) (Note: Also romanized as Ḩoseynābād; also known as Ferdowsī) is a village in Zavarom Rural District of the Central District in Shirvan County, North Khorasan province, Iran.

== Demographics ==
=== Population ===
At the time of the 2006 National Census, the village's population was 2,572 in 601 households. The following census in 2011 counted 3,665 people in 866 households. The 2016 census measured the population of the village as 2,909 people in 782 households. It was the most populous village in its rural district.
