= Eltun Iskenderov =

Azerbaijani border guard

- Born: October 21, 1990; Ahmedbeyli, Samukh Region
- Died: June 18, 2009 (aged 18); Jalilabad, Azerbaijan
- Occupation: Military
- Years active: 2008-2009
- Employer: State Border Service
- Awards: National Hero of Azerbaijan

Eltun Iskenderov (Azerbaijani: Eltun Xaləddin oğlu İsgəndərov; October 21, 1990 - June 18, 2009) was an Azerbaijani border guard. He was awarded National Hero of Azerbaijan.

== Biography ==
Iskanderov Eltun was born in village Akhmedbeyli, Samukh region. In 2008, he enlisted in State Border Service of Azerbaijan. During his service he was marked by the command as an exemplary soldier and was awarded a badge. A letter of gratitude was sent to his family by State Border Service.

Eltun died in a firefight against criminals who tried to illegally cross the Azerbaijan-Iran border. The event occurred near Asadli village, Jalilabad region (near Iran). Eltun covered a grenade with his own body and saved his colleagues. Two officers were heavily injured. The bandits were killed by return fire.

== Legacy ==
According to a presidential decree, Eltun was awarded the title of National Hero of Azerbaijan posthumously. He was buried in his village’s cemetery.

In 2019, a high school in Samukh region was named in his honor. The memorial plaque was placed at the school.
