= Əli Bayramlı, Qakh =

Əli Bayramlı
- Location within Azerbaijan Location within Shaki-Zagatala Economic Region
- Coordinates: 41°19′37″N 46°52′05″E
- Country: Azerbaijan
- Rayon: Qakh
- Time zone: UTC+4 (AZT)
  - Summer (DST): UTC+5 (AZT)

Əli Bayramlı (also, Aly-Bayramly) is a village in the Qakh Rayon of Azerbaijan.
