= Burbur, North Khorasan =

Village in North Khorasan province, Iran

Burbur Persian: بوربور
- Village
- Location within Iran
- Coordinates: 37°38′38″N 57°06′08″E
- Country: Iran
- Province: North Khorasan
- County: Bojnord
- District: Central
- Rural District: Badranlu

Population (2016)
  - Total: 909
- Time zone: UTC+3:30 (IRST)

Burbur (Persian: بوربور) (Note: Also romanized as Burbūr; also known as Būrbūr-e Kord and Būrbūr Kord) is a village in Badranlu Rural District of the Central District in Bojnord County, North Khorasan province, Iran.

== Demographics ==
=== Population ===
At the time of the 2006 National Census, the village's population was 986 in 221 households. The following census in 2011 counted 983 people in 272 households. The 2016 census measured the population of the village as 909 people in 256 households.
