= Now Deh, North Khorasan =

Village in North Khorasan province, Iran

Now Deh Persian: نوده
- Village
- Location within Iran
- Coordinates: 37°21′51″N 57°35′36″E
- Country: Iran
- Province: North Khorasan
- County: Bojnord
- District: Garmkhan
- Rural District: Garmkhan

Population (2016)
  - Total: 1,337
- Time zone: UTC+3:30 (IRST)

Now Deh (Persian: نوده) is a village in Garmkhan Rural District of Garmkhan District in Bojnord County, North Khorasan province, Iran.

== Demographics ==
=== Population ===
At the time of the 2006 National Census, the village's population was 1,645 in 430 households. The following census in 2011 counted 1,584 people in 483 households. The 2016 census measured the population of the village as 1,337 people in 423 households.
