= Kalateh-ye Shahida Zarsa =

Village in North Khorasan province, Iran

Kalateh-ye Shahida Zarsa Persian: كلاته شهيداذرسا
- Village
- Location within Iran
- Coordinates: 37°30′26″N 57°19′20″E
- Country: Iran
- Province: North Khorasan
- County: Bojnord
- District: Central
- Rural District: Badranlu

Population (2016)
  - Total: 1,088
- Time zone: UTC+3:30 (IRST)

Kalateh-ye Shahida Zarsa (Persian: كلاته شهيداذرسا) (Note: Also romanized as Kalāteh-ye Shahīdā Zarsā; also known as Sanjarābād (سنجراباد)) is a village in Badranlu Rural District of the Central District in Bojnord County, North Khorasan province, Iran.

== Demographics ==
=== Population ===
At the time of the 2006 National Census, the village's population was 650 in 130 households. The following census in 2011 counted 981 people in 236 households. The 2016 census measured the population of the village as 1,088 people in 299 households.
