= Shahrak Tatar =

Village in North Khorasan province, Iran

Shahrak Tatar Persian: شهرك تاتار
- Village
- Location within Iran
- Coordinates: 37°31′42″N 57°07′12″E
- Country: Iran
- Province: North Khorasan
- County: Bojnord
- District: Central
- Rural District: Badranlu

Population (2016)
  - Total: 906
- Time zone: UTC+3:30 (IRST)

Shahrak Tatar (Persian: شهرك تاتار) (Note: Also romanized as Shahraḵ Tātār; also known as Ḩalīmābād (حليم اباد) and Kalāteh-ye Qā‘enī) is a village in Badranlu Rural District of the Central District in Bojnord County, North Khorasan province, Iran.

== Demographics ==
=== Population ===
At the time of the 2006 National Census, the village's population was 882 in 230 households. The following census in 2011 counted 1,004 people in 291 households. The 2016 census measured the population of the village as 906 people in 282 households.
