= Badamloq =

Village in North Khorasan province, Iran

Badamloq Persian: باداملق
- Village
- Location within Iran
- Coordinates: 37°18′08″N 57°40′13″E
- Country: Iran
- Province: North Khorasan
- County: Shirvan
- District: Central
- Rural District: Zavarom

Population (2016)
  - Total: 211
- Time zone: UTC+3:30 (IRST)

Badamloq (Persian: باداملق) (Note: Also romanized as Bādāmloq; also known as Bādāmlūq) is a village in Zavarom Rural District of the Central District in Shirvan County, North Khorasan province, Iran.

== Demographics ==
=== Population ===
At the time of the 2006 National Census, the village's population was 262 in 69 households. The following census in 2011 counted 261 people in 82 households. The 2016 census measured the population of the village as 211 people in 78 households.
