= Əsədli, Sabirabad =

Əsədli
- Municipality
- Location within Azerbaijan
- Coordinates: 40°00′47″N 48°31′18″E
- Country: Azerbaijan
- Rayon: Sabirabad

Population
  - Total: 1,419
- Time zone: UTC+4 (AZT)
  - Summer (DST): UTC+5 (AZT)

Əsədli (also, Asadly, Asalty, and Asatly) is a village and municipality in the Sabirabad Rayon of Azerbaijan. It has a population of 1,419.
