= Chahar Borj-e Olya =

Chahar Borj-e Olya چهاربرج عليا
- Village
- Location within Iran
- Coordinates: 37°37′22″N 57°32′20″E
- Country: Iran
- Province: North Khorasan
- County: Bojnord
- Bakhsh: Garmkhan
- Rural District: Garmkhan

Population (2006)
  - Total: 93
- Time zone: UTC+3:30 (IRST)
  - Summer (DST): UTC+4:30 (IRDT)

Chahar Borj-e Olya (Persian: چهاربرج عليا, also Romanized as Chahār Borj-e ‘Olyā) is a village in Garmkhan Rural District, Garmkhan District, Bojnord County, North Khorasan Province, Iran. At the 2006 census, its population was 93, in 19 families.
