= Kuh Kamar, North Khorasan =

Village in North Khorasan province, Iran

Kuh Kamar Persian: كوه كمر
- Village
- Location within Iran
- Coordinates: 37°26′19″N 57°27′53″E
- Country: Iran
- Province: North Khorasan
- County: Bojnord
- District: Central
- Rural District: Baba Aman

Population (2016)
  - Total: 379
- Time zone: UTC+3:30 (IRST)

Kuh Kamar (Persian: كوه كمر) (Note: Also romanized as Kūh Kamar; also known as Gav Kamar and Kūk Kamar) is a village in Baba Aman Rural District of the Central District in Bojnord County, North Khorasan province, Iran.

== Demographics ==
=== Population ===
At the time of the 2006 National Census, the village's population was 434 in 92 households. The following census in 2011 counted 346 people in 96 households. The 2016 census measured the population of the village as 379 people in 105 households.
