= Esfidan, Bojnord =

Village in North Khorasan province, Iran

Esfidan Persian: اسفيدان
- Village
- Location within Iran
- Coordinates: 37°19′36″N 57°34′25″E
- Country: Iran
- Province: North Khorasan
- County: Bojnord
- District: Garmkhan
- Rural District: Garmkhan

Population (2016)
  - Total: 1,371
- Time zone: UTC+3:30 (IRST)

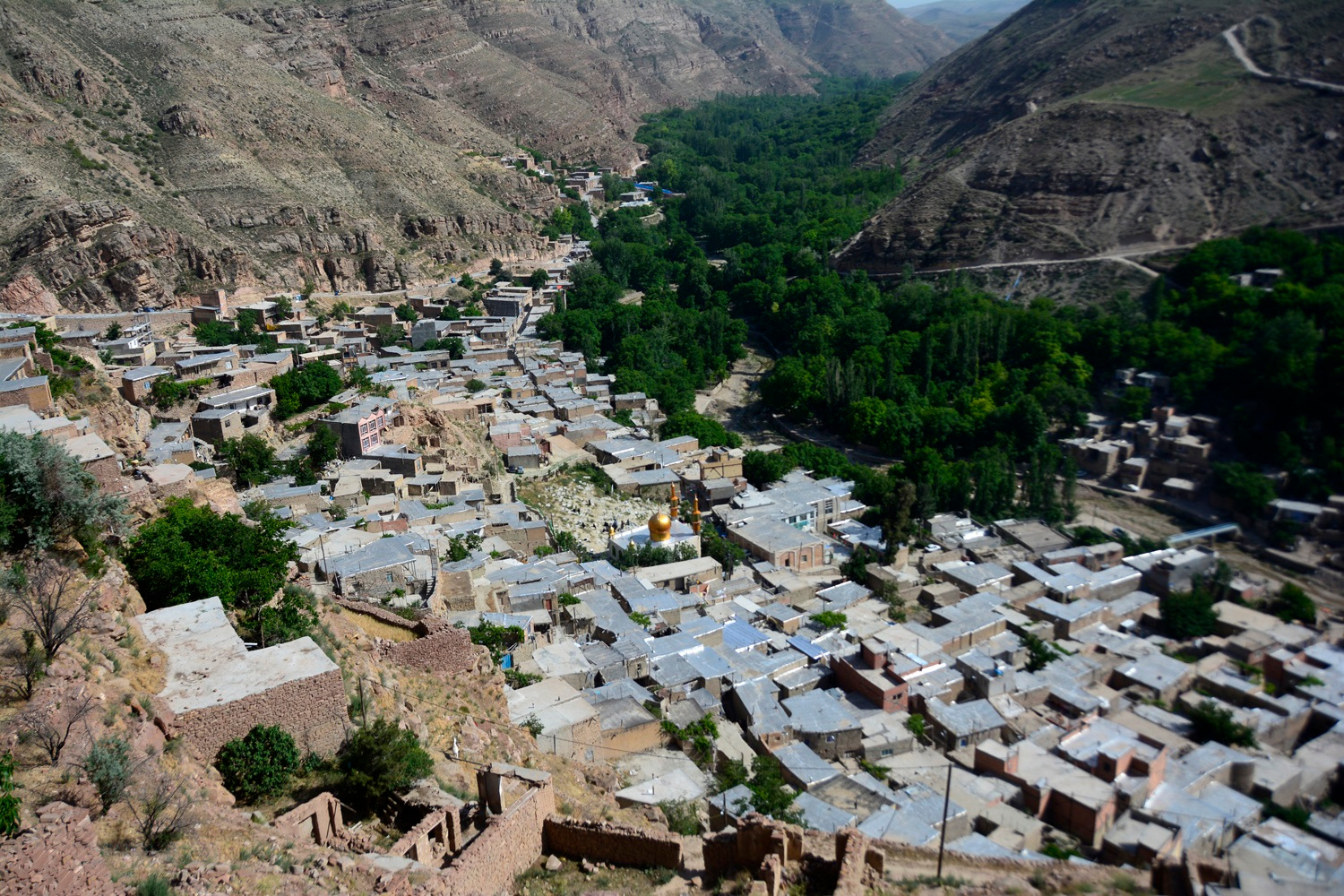

Esfidan (Persian: اسفيدان) (Note: Also romanized as Esfīdān) is a village in Garmkhan Rural District of Garmkhan District in Bojnord County, North Khorasan province, Iran.

== Demographics ==
=== Population ===
At the time of the 2006 National Census, the village's population was 1,949 in 530 households. The following census in 2011 counted 1,713 people in 544 households. The 2016 census measured the population of the village as 1,371 people in 453 households, the most populous in its rural district.
