= Hamid, North Khorasan =

Village in North Khorasan province, Iran

Hamid Persian: حميد
- Village
- Location within Iran
- Coordinates: 37°25′29″N 57°24′51″E
- Country: Iran
- Province: North Khorasan
- County: Bojnord
- District: Central
- Rural District: Baba Aman

Population (2016)
  - Total: 650
- Time zone: UTC+3:30 (IRST)

Hamid (Persian: حميد) (Note: Also romanized as Ḩamīd; also known as Qal‘eh Ḩamīd) is a village in Baba Aman Rural District of the Central District in Bojnord County, North Khorasan province, Iran.

== Demographics ==
=== Population ===
At the time of the 2006 National Census, the village's population was 651 in 135 households. The following census in 2011 counted 649 people in 166 households. The 2016 census measured the population of the village as 650 people in 173 households.
