= Baba Aman =

Village in North Khorasan province, Iran

Baba Aman Persian: باباامان
- Village
- Location within Iran
- Coordinates: 37°28′38″N 57°26′23″E
- Country: Iran
- Province: North Khorasan
- County: Bojnord
- District: Central
- Rural District: Baba Aman

Population (2016)
  - Total: 640
- Time zone: UTC+3:30 (IRST)

Baba Aman (Persian: باباامان) (Note: Also romanized as Bābā Amān; also known as Bavāmān Qal‘eh) is a village in, and the capital of, Baba Aman Rural District in the Central District of Bojnord County, North Khorasan province, Iran. The previous capital of the rural district was the village of Hesar-e Garmkhan, now a city.

== Demographics ==
=== Population ===
At the time of the 2006 National Census, the village's population was 567 in 146 households. The following census in 2011 counted 640 people in 191 households. The 2016 census measured the population of the village as 640 people in 199 households.
