= Mollacəlilli =

- Location within Azerbaijan
- Coordinates: 40°35′34″N 46°22′09″E
- Country: Azerbaijan
- Rayon: Goygol

Population
  - Total: 1,805
- Time zone: UTC+4 (AZT)
  - Summer (DST): UTC+5 (AZT)

Mollacəlilli (known as Yeni Əlibayramlı until 1999) is a village and municipality in the Goygol Rayon of Azerbaijan. It has a population of 1,805.
