= Khandaqlu, North Khorasan =

Khandaqlu خندقلو
- village
- Location within Iran
- Coordinates: 37°31′30″N 57°10′11″E
- Country: Iran
- Province: North Khorasan
- County: Bojnord
- Bakhsh: Central
- Rural District: Badranlu

Population (2006)
  - Total: 393
- Time zone: UTC+3:30 (IRST)
  - Summer (DST): UTC+4:30 (IRDT)

Khandaqlu (Persian: خندقلو, also Romanized as Khandaqlū) is a village in Badranlu Rural District, in the Central District of Bojnord County, North Khorasan Province, Iran. At the 2006 census, its population was 393, in 94 families.

== Part of the dialect of this village ==
Alamut dialect	Khandaqlu village dialect	Alamut dialect	Khandaqlu village dialect	Persian translation of the first two columns	Persian translation of the second two columns	English translation of the first two columns	English translation of the second two columns
Per, Babeh, Dada	Babo	Mama	Mamey	Pedar	Madar Bozorg	Father	GrandMather
Mar, Nane	Nane	Khuar, dada, Khakhor	Dadey, Kha, Khang	Madar	Khahar	Mather	Sister, Sisy
Baba	Babo Ger	Berar	Berar, Bero	Pedar Bozorg	Baradar	Grandfather	Brother

== The origins of the village people ==
The tribes of this village are Sadat, Sheikh Buyid, Khandaqlu, and Pushulanlu. Sheikh Buyid, Khandaqlu, and Pushulanlu are from the same paternal lineage as Daylami and are from the Buyid family, and Sadat is from the maternal lineage of these tribes.

== Migration of some of the village people ==
The village was a rural area two centuries ago, and with the migration of some of the village's tribes, the population of this village decreased and it was no longer a rural area, and it is not a rural area now. Before the revolution, some of the village's tribes were also migrating.
