= Cherik, Iran =

Cherik چریک
- Village
- Location within Iran
- Coordinates: 37°34′48″N 57°07′08″E
- Country: Iran
- Province: North Khorasan
- County: Bojnord
- Bakhsh: Central
- Rural District: Badranlu

Population (2006)
  - Total: 270
- Time zone: UTC+3:30 (IRST)
  - Summer (DST): UTC+4:30 (IRDT)

Cherik (Persian: چریک, also Romanized as Cherrīk, Charrīk, and Cherak) is a village in Badranlu Rural District, in the Central District of Bojnord County, North Khorasan Province, Iran. At the 2006 census, its population was 270, in 58 families.
