= Chahar Borj-e Sofla =

Chahar Borj-e Sofla چهاربرج سفلي
- Village
- Location within Iran
- Coordinates: 37°36′31″N 57°31′25″E
- Country: Iran
- Province: North Khorasan
- County: Bojnord
- Bakhsh: Garmkhan
- Rural District: Garmkhan

Population (2006)
  - Total: 36
- Time zone: UTC+3:30 (IRST)
  - Summer (DST): UTC+4:30 (IRDT)

Chahar Borj-e Sofla (Persian: چهاربرج سفلي, also Romanized as Chahār Borj-e Soflá; also known as Chahār Borj-e Pā’īn) is a village in Garmkhan Rural District, Garmkhan District, Bojnord County, North Khorasan Province, Iran. At the 2006 census, its population was 36, in 9 families.
