= Hesar-e Garmkhan =

City in North Khorasan province, Iran

Hesar-e Garmkhan Persian: حصارگرمخان
- City
- Location within Iran
- Coordinates: 37°30′58″N 57°29′04″E
- Country: Iran
- Province: North Khorasan
- County: Bojnord
- District: Garmkhan
- Established as a city: 2000

Population (2016)
  - Total: 1,499
- Time zone: UTC+3:30 (IRST)

Hesar-e Garmkhan (Persian: حصارگرمخان) (Note: Also romanized as Ḩeşār-e Garmkhān; also known as Ḩeşār and Heşār) is a city in, and the capital of, Garmkhan District in Bojnord County, North Khorasan province, Iran. It also serves as the administrative center for Garmkhan Rural District. As a village, it was the capital of Baba Aman Rural District until its capital was transferred to the village of Baba Aman. Hesar-e Garmkhan was converted to a city in 2000.

== Demographics ==
=== Population ===
At the time of the 2006 National Census, the city's population was 716 in 182 households. The following census in 2011 counted 1,658 people in 387 households. The 2016 census measured the population of the city as 1,499 people in 403 households.
