= Jammi =

Village in North Khorasan province, Iran

Jammi Persian: جمی
- Village
- Location within Iran
- Coordinates: 37°25′14″N 57°33′51″E
- Country: Iran
- Province: North Khorasan
- County: Bojnord
- District: Central
- Rural District: Baba Aman

Population (2016)
  - Total: 1,697
- Time zone: UTC+3:30 (IRST)

Jammi (Persian: جمی) (Note: Also romanized as Jamī, Jammey, and Jammī) is a village in Baba Aman Rural District of the Central District in Bojnord County, North Khorasan province, Iran.

== Demographics ==
=== Population ===
At the time of the 2006 National Census, the village's population was 1,755 in 397 households. The following census in 2011 counted 1,853 people in 447 households. The 2016 census measured the population of the village as 1,697 people in 425 households.
