= Sheykh Teymur, West Azerbaijan =

Sheykh Teymur شيخ تيمور
- Village
- Location within Iran
- Coordinates: 37°36′31″N 45°06′06″E
- Country: Iran
- Province: West Azerbaijan
- County: Urmia
- Bakhsh: Central
- Rural District: Bash Qaleh

Population (2006)
  - Total: 159
- Time zone: UTC+3:30 (IRST)
  - Summer (DST): UTC+4:30 (IRDT)

Sheykh Teymur (Persian: شيخ تيمور, also Romanized as Sheykh Teymūr) is a village in Bash Qaleh Rural District, in the Central District of Urmia County, West Azerbaijan Province, Iran. At the 2006 census, its population was 159, in 38 families.
