= Nargeslu-ye Sofla =

Nargeslu-ye Sofla نرگسلوسفلي
- Village
- Location within Iran
- Coordinates: 37°30′50″N 57°04′52″E
- Country: Iran
- Province: North Khorasan
- County: Bojnord
- Bakhsh: Central
- Rural District: Badranlu

Population (2006)
  - Total: 229
- Time zone: UTC+3:30 (IRST)
  - Summer (DST): UTC+4:30 (IRDT)

Nargeslu-ye Sofla (Persian: نرگسلوسفلي, also Romanized as Nargeslū-ye Soflá; also known as Kūrānlū, Nargeslupā’īn, and Nargeslū-ye Pā’īn) is a village in Badranlu Rural District, in the Central District of Bojnord County, North Khorasan Province, Iran. At the 2006 census, its population was 229, in 63 families.
