= Badranlu =

Village in North Khorasan province, Iran

Badranlu Persian: بدرانلو
- Village
- Location within Iran
- Coordinates: 37°31′58″N 57°05′35″E
- Country: Iran
- Province: North Khorasan
- County: Bojnord
- District: Central
- Rural District: Badranlu

Population (2016)
  - Total: 1,121
- Time zone: UTC+3:30 (IRST)

Badranlu (Persian: بدرانلو) (Note: Also romanized as Badarānlu and Badrānlū; also known as Bāderālū and Badranglu) is a village in, and the capital of, Badranlu Rural District in the Central District of Bojnord County, North Khorasan province, Iran.

== Demographics ==
=== Population ===
At the time of the 2006 National Census, the village's population was 910 in 264 households. The following census in 2011 counted 823 people in 261 households. The 2016 census measured the population of the village as 1,121 people in 344 households.
