= Qezel Hesar, North Khorasan =

Village in North Khorasan province, Iran

Qezel Hesar Persian: قزل حصار
- Village
- Location within Iran
- Coordinates: 37°21′26″N 57°40′52″E
- Country: Iran
- Province: North Khorasan
- County: Shirvan
- District: Central
- Rural District: Zavarom

Population (2016)
  - Total: 119
- Time zone: UTC+3:30 (IRST)

Qezel Hesar (Persian: قزل حصار) (Note: Also romanized as Qezel Ḩeşār) is a village in Zavarom Rural District of the Central District in Shirvan County, North Khorasan province, Iran.

== Demographics ==
=== Population ===
At the time of the 2006 National Census, the village's population was 230 in 50 households. The following census in 2011 counted 140 people in 34 households. The 2016 census measured the population of the village as 119 people in 35 households.
