= Mehnan =

Village in North Khorasan province, Iran

Mehnan Persian: مهنان
- Village
- Location within Iran
- Coordinates: 37°21′52″N 57°18′22″E
- Country: Iran
- Province: North Khorasan
- County: Bojnord
- District: Central
- Rural District: Aladagh

Population (2016)
  - Total: 1,168
- Time zone: UTC+3:30 (IRST)

Mehnan (Persian: مهنان) (Note: Also romanized as Mehnān; also known as Mehnān Bālā, Mehnān-e Bālā, and Qamparānlū) is a village in Aladagh Rural District of the Central District in Bojnord County, North Khorasan province, Iran.

== Demographics ==
=== Population ===
At the time of the 2006 National Census, the village's population was 1,341 in 326 households. The following census in 2011 counted 1,300 people in 346 households. The 2016 census measured the population of the village as 1,168 people in 344 households.
