= Qarloq, North Khorasan =

Village in North Khorasan province, Iran

Qarloq Persian: قارلق
- Village
- Location within Iran
- Coordinates: 37°30′09″N 57°27′06″E
- Country: Iran
- Province: North Khorasan
- County: Bojnord
- District: Garmkhan
- Rural District: Garmkhan

Population (2016)
  - Total: 629
- Time zone: UTC+3:30 (IRST)

Qarloq (Persian: قارلق) (Note: Also romanized as Qārleq and Qārloq) is a village in Garmkhan Rural District of Garmkhan District in Bojnord County, North Khorasan province, Iran.

== Demographics ==
=== Population ===
At the time of the 2006 National Census, the village's population was 609 in 151 households. The following census in 2011 counted 675 people in 191 households. The 2016 census measured the population of the village as 629 people in 193 households.
