= Chahar Kharvar =

Village in North Khorasan province, Iran

Chahar Kharvar Persian: چهارخروار
- Village
- Location within Iran
- Coordinates: 37°27′08″N 57°27′20″E
- Country: Iran
- Province: North Khorasan
- County: Bojnord
- District: Central
- Rural District: Baba Aman

Population (2016)
  - Total: 705
- Time zone: UTC+3:30 (IRST)

Chahar Kharvar (Persian: چهارخروار) (Note: Also romanized as Chahār Kharvār; also known as Qeshlāq) is a village in Baba Aman Rural District of the Central District in Bojnord County, North Khorasan province, Iran.

== Demographics ==
=== Population ===
At the time of the 2006 National Census, the village's population was 460 in 117 households. The following census in 2011 counted 440 people in 122 households. The 2016 census measured the population of the village as 705 people in 199 households.
