= Bidak, Bojnord =

Village in North Khorasan province, Iran

Bidak Persian: بيدک
- Village
- Location within Iran
- Coordinates: 37°28′19″N 57°13′11″E
- Country: Iran
- Province: North Khorasan
- County: Bojnord
- District: Central
- Rural District: Badranlu

Population (2016)
  - Total: 3,482
- Time zone: UTC+3:30 (IRST)

Bidak (Persian: بيدک) (Note: Also romanized as Bīdak) is a village in Badranlu Rural District of the Central District in Bojnord County, North Khorasan province, Iran.

== Demographics ==
=== Population ===
At the time of the 2006 National Census, the village's population was 2,800 in 663 households. The following census in 2011 counted 3,342 people in 855 households. The 2016 census measured the population of the village as 3,482 people in 953 households.
