= Nargeslu-ye Olya =

Nargeslu-ye Olya نرگسلوعليا
- Village
- Location within Iran
- Coordinates: 37°29′17″N 57°04′36″E
- Country: Iran
- Province: North Khorasan
- County: Bojnord
- Bakhsh: Central
- Rural District: Badranlu

Population (2006)
  - Total: 237
- Time zone: UTC+3:30 (IRST)
  - Summer (DST): UTC+4:30 (IRDT)

Nargeslu-ye Olya (Persian: نرگسلوعليا, also Romanized as Nargeslū-ye ‘Olyā; also known as Nargeslū-ye Bālā and Nārgeslū Bala) is a village in Badranlu Rural District, in the Central District of Bojnord County, North Khorasan Province, Iran. At the 2006 census, its population was 237, in 65 families.
