= Əli Bayramlı, Qazax =

Əli Bayramlı
- Location within Azerbaijan
- Coordinates: 41°13′48″N 45°10′05″E
- Country: Azerbaijan
- Rayon: Qazakh
- Time zone: UTC+4 (AZT)
  - Summer (DST): UTC+5 (AZT)

Əli Bayramlı (also, Äli Bayramly and Ali-Bayramly) is a village in the Qazakh Rayon of Azerbaijan.
