= Allah Verdi Khan =

Village in North Khorasan province, Iran

Allah Verdi Khan Persian: اله ورديخان
- Village
- Location within Iran
- Coordinates: 37°25′47″N 57°18′32″E
- Country: Iran
- Province: North Khorasan
- County: Bojnord
- District: Central
- Rural District: Aladagh

Population (2016)
  - Total: 1,655
- Time zone: UTC+3:30 (IRST)

Allah Verdi Khan (Persian: اله ورديخان) (Note: Also romanized as Allāh Verdī Khān) is a village in Aladagh Rural District of the Central District in Bojnord County, North Khorasan province, Iran.

== Demographics ==
=== Population ===
At the time of the 2006 National Census, the village's population was 1,071 in 259 households. The following census in 2011 counted 1,361 people in 365 households. The 2016 census measured the population of the village as 1,655 people in 469 households.
