= Zavarom =

Village in North Khorasan province, Iran

Zavarom Persian: زوارم
- Village
- Location within Iran
- Coordinates: 37°19′13″N 57°44′05″E
- Country: Iran
- Province: North Khorasan
- County: Shirvan
- District: Central
- Rural District: Zavarom

Population (2016)
  - Total: 1,421
- Time zone: UTC+3:30 (IRST)

Zavarom (Persian: زوارم) (Note: Also romanized as Zavārom and Zuāram; also known as Zo Eram, Zoeram, Zuārān, and Zueram) is a village in, and the capital of, Zavarom Rural District in the Central District of Shirvan County, North Khorasan province, Iran.

== Demographics ==
=== Population ===
At the time of the 2006 National Census, the village's population was 1,585 in 448 households. The following census in 2011 counted 1,320 people in 447 households. The 2016 census measured the population of the village as 1,421 people in 484 households.
