= Kalateh-ye Sohrab, North Khorasan =

Kalateh-ye Sohrab كلاته سهراب
- Village
- Location within Iran
- Coordinates: 37°16′46″N 57°35′06″E
- Country: Iran
- Province: North Khorasan
- County: Bojnord
- Bakhsh: Garmkhan
- Rural District: Garmkhan

Population (2006)
  - Total: 494
- Time zone: UTC+3:30 (IRST)
  - Summer (DST): UTC+4:30 (IRDT)

Kalateh-ye Sohrab (Persian: كلاته سهراب, also Romanized as Kalāteh-ye Sohrāb and Kalāteh Sohrāb) is a village in Garmkhan Rural District, Garmkhan District, Bojnord County, North Khorasan Province, Iran. At the 2006 census, its population was 494, in 125 families.
