= Sheykh Teymur, North Khorasan =

Sheykh Teymur شيخ تيمور
- Village
- Location within Iran
- Coordinates: 37°30′43″N 57°06′08″E
- Country: Iran
- Province: North Khorasan
- County: Bojnord
- Bakhsh: Central
- Rural District: Badranlu

Population (2006)
  - Total: 216
- Time zone: UTC+3:30 (IRST)
  - Summer (DST): UTC+4:30 (IRDT)

Sheykh Teymur (Persian: شيخ تيمور, also Romanized as Sheykh Teymūr and Sheykh Teymūrī) is a village in Badranlu Rural District, in the Central District of Bojnord County, North Khorasan Province, Iran. At the 2006 census, its population was 216, in 68 families.
