= Baghcheq =

Village in North Khorasan province, Iran

Baghcheq Persian: باغ چق
- Village
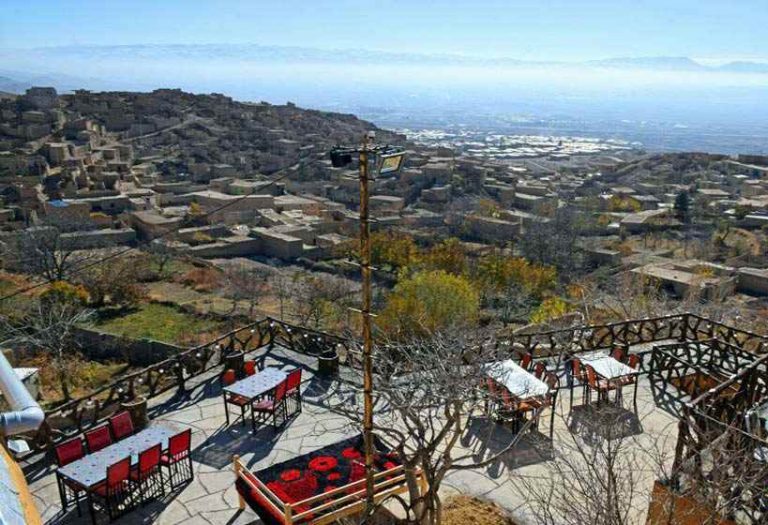
- The village of Baghcheq

- Location within Iran
- Coordinates: 37°33′24″N 57°18′11″E
- Country: Iran
- Province: North Khorasan
- County: Bojnord
- District: Central
- Rural District: Baba Aman

Population (2016)
  - Total: 2,163
- Time zone: UTC+3:30 (IRST)

Baghcheq (Persian: باغ چق) (Note: Also romanized as Bāghcheq; also known as Bāgh Chīn) is a village in Baba Aman Rural District of the Central District in Bojnord County, North Khorasan province, Iran.

== Demographics ==
=== Population ===
At the time of the 2006 National Census, the village's population was 1,886 in 473 households. The following census in 2011 counted 2,116 people in 537 households. The 2016 census measured the population of the village as 2,163 people in 596 households.
