= Gujgi-ye Bala =

Village in Razavi Khorasan province, Iran

Gujgi-ye Bala گوجگی بالا
- Village
- Location within Iran
- Coordinates: 36°35′03″N 59°49′59″E
- Country: Iran
- Province: Razavi Khorasan
- County: Mashhad
- Bakhsh: Central
- Rural District: Tabadkan

Population (2006)
  - Total: 511
- Time zone: UTC+3:30 (IRST)
  - Summer (DST): UTC+4:30 (IRDT)

Gujgi-ye Bala (Persian: گوجگی بالا, also Romanized as Gūjgī-ye Bālā and Gūjkī-ye Bālā; also known as Bīūkī, Bū’īkī, Bujgi, Gūjgī, and Gūjkī) is a village in Tabadkan Rural District, in the Central District of Mashhad County, Razavi Khorasan Province, Iran. At the 2006 census, its population was 511, in 137 families.
