= Kalateh-ye Ashian =

Village in North Khorasan province, Iran

Kalateh-ye Ashian Persian: کلاته اشيان
- Village
- Location within Iran
- Coordinates: 37°28′31″N 57°25′06″E
- Country: Iran
- Province: North Khorasan
- County: Bojnord
- District: Central
- Rural District: Baba Aman

Population (2016)
  - Total: 225
- Time zone: UTC+3:30 (IRST)

Kalateh-ye Ashian (Persian: کلاته اشيان) (Note: Also romanized as Kalāteh-ye Āshīān; also known as Kalāgh-ye Āshīān (كلاغ اشيان)) is a village in Baba Aman Rural District of the Central District in Bojnord County, North Khorasan province, Iran.

== Demographics ==
=== Population ===
At the time of the 2006 National Census, the village's population was 230 in 61 households. The following census in 2011 counted 219 people in 64 households. The 2016 census measured the population of the village as 225 people in 72 households.
