= Pasandarreh =

Pasandarreh پسين دره
- Village
- Location within Iran
- Coordinates: 37°51′16″N 57°12′15″E
- Country: Iran
- Province: North Khorasan
- County: Bojnord
- Bakhsh: Garmkhan
- Rural District: Gifan

Population (2006)
  - Total: 248
- Time zone: UTC+3:30 (IRST)
  - Summer (DST): UTC+4:30 (IRDT)

Pasandarreh (Persian: پسين دره; also known as Pīsh Darreh and Pish Qal‘eh) is a village in Gifan Rural District, Garmkhan District, Bojnord County, North Khorasan Province, Iran. At the 2006 census, its population was 248, in 55 families.
