= Əhmədbəyli, Samukh =

Ahmedbeyli Azerbaijani: Əhmədbəyli
- Municipality
- Location within Azerbaijan
- Coordinates: 40°44′21″N 46°28′16″E
- Country: Azerbaijan
- Rayon: Samukh

Population
  - Total: 917
- Time zone: UTC+4 (AZT)
  - Summer (DST): UTC+5 (AZT)

Ahmedbeyli (known as Ali Bayramly until 1999) is a village and municipality in the Samukh Rayon of Azerbaijan. It has a population of 1,521.
