= Esfidan, Isfahan =

Esfidan اسفيدان
- Village
- Location within Iran
- Coordinates: 33°27′12″N 52°02′05″E
- Country: Iran
- Province: Isfahan
- County: Natanz
- Bakhsh: Central
- Rural District: Karkas

Population (2006)
  - Total: 137
- Time zone: UTC+3:30 (IRST)
  - Summer (DST): UTC+4:30 (IRDT)

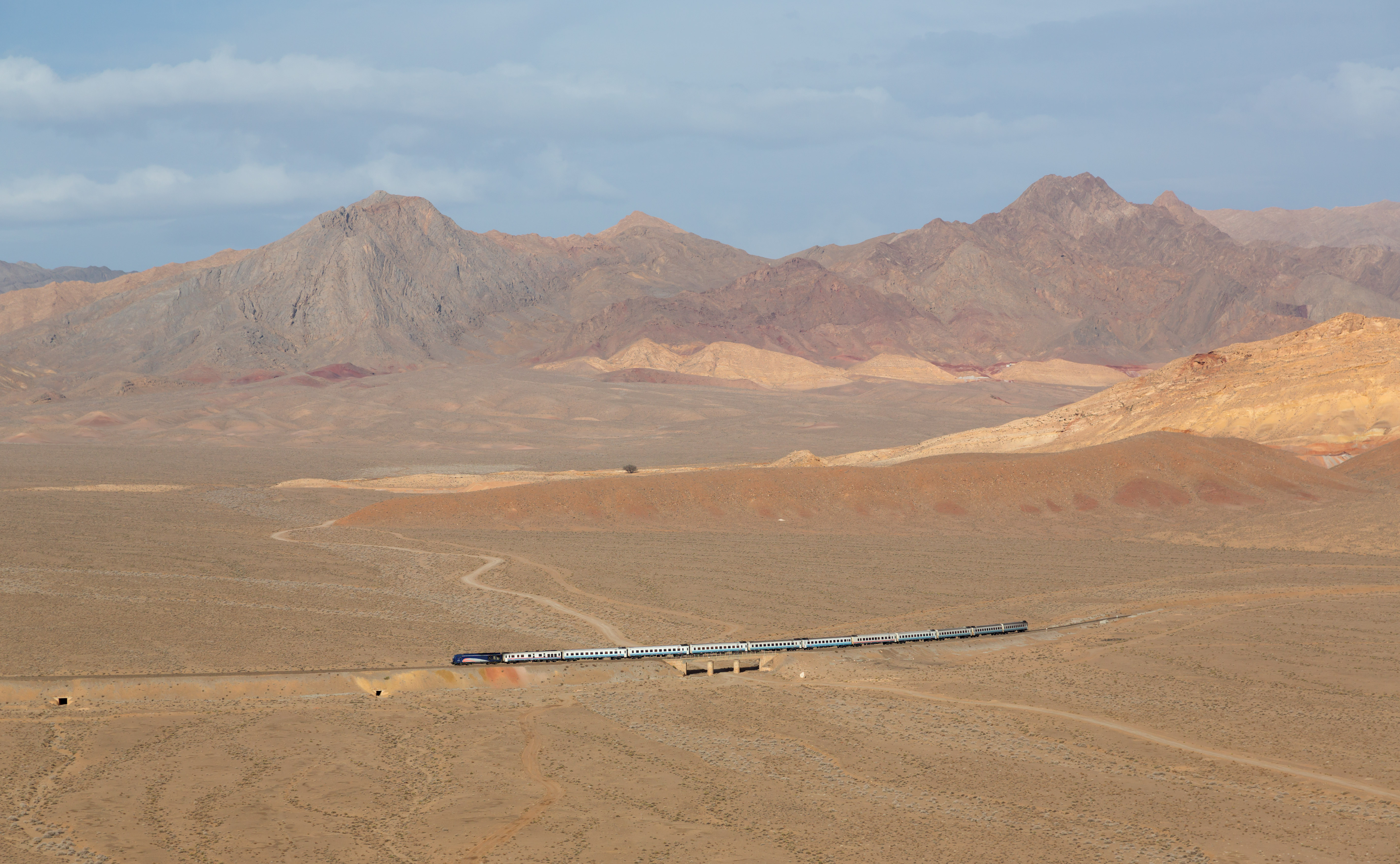
A Siemens ER24PC "IranRunner" of Islamic Republic of Iran Railways with a passenger train is headed towards Tehran. The photo was taken in the curves north of Sejzi, Iran.

Esfidan (Persian: اسفيدان, also Romanized as Esfīdān; also known as Esfedān, Espīdān, and Sepīdān) is a village in Karkas Rural District, in the Central District of Natanz County, Isfahan Province, Iran. At the 2006 census, its population was 137, in 39 families.
