= Əsədli, Jalilabad =

Əsədli
- Municipality
- Location within Azerbaijan
- Coordinates: 39°06′41″N 48°19′04″E
- Country: Azerbaijan
- Rayon: Jalilabad

Population
  - Total: 937
- Time zone: UTC+4 (AZT)
  - Summer (DST): UTC+5 (AZT)

Əsədli (also, Asadly) is a village and municipality in the Jalilabad Rayon of Azerbaijan. It has a population of 937.
