= Aladagh Rural District =

Rural district in North Khorasan province, Iran

Aladagh Rural District Persian: دهستان آلاداغ
- Rural District
- Location within Iran
- Coordinates: 37°21′N 57°15′E
- Country: Iran
- Province: North Khorasan
- County: Bojnord
- District: Central
- Established: 1987
- Capital: Khush Manzar

Population (2016)
  - Total: 28,218
- Time zone: UTC+3:30 (IRST)

Aladagh Rural District (Persian: دهستان آلاداغ) is in the Central District of Bojnord County, North Khorasan province, Iran. Its capital is the village of Khush Manzar.

== Etymology ==
The rural district takes its name from the Aladagh Mountains, deriving from Turkish ala dağ, meaning "variegated or speckled mountain (range)."

== Demographics ==
=== Population ===
At the time of the 2006 National Census, the rural district's population was 26,259 in 6,408 households. There were 32,494 inhabitants in 8,863 households at the following census of 2011. The 2016 census measured the population of the rural district as 28,218 in 7,763 households. The most populous of its 58 villages was Sandalabad, with 4,354 people.

=== Other villages in the rural district ===
- Allah Verdi Khan
- Arkan
- Dartum
- Gerivan
- Kacharanlu
- Khoda Qoli
- Mehnan
