= Garmkhan Rural District =

Rural district in North Khorasan province, Iran

Garmkhan Rural District Persian: دهستان گرمخان
- Rural District
- Location within Iran
- Coordinates: 37°31′N 57°28′E
- Country: Iran
- Province: North Khorasan
- County: Bojnord
- District: Garmkhan
- Established: 1995
- Capital: Hesar-e Garmkhan

Population (2016)
  - Total: 13,844
- Time zone: UTC+3:30 (IRST)

Garmkhan Rural District (Persian: دهستان گرمخان) is in Garmkhan District of Bojnord County, North Khorasan province, Iran. It is administered from the city of Hesar-e Garmkhan.

== Demographics ==
=== Population ===
At the time of the 2006 National Census, the rural district's population was 17,104 in 4,108 households. There were 15,720 inhabitants in 4,476 households at the following census of 2011. The 2016 census measured the population of the rural district as 13,844 in 4,107 households. The most populous of its 51 villages was Esfidan, with 1,371 people.

=== Other villages in the rural district ===
- Now Deh
- Qarah Khan Bandi
- Qarloq
- Quch Qaleh-ye Olya
- Sar Cheshmeh
- Soluli
