= Badranlu Rural District =

Rural district in North Khorasan province, Iran

Badranlu Rural District Persian: دهستان بدرانلو
- Rural District
- Location within Iran
- Coordinates: 37°32′N 57°10′E
- Country: Iran
- Province: North Khorasan
- County: Bojnord
- District: Central
- Established: 1987
- Capital: Badranlu

Population (2016)
  - Total: 23,944
- Time zone: UTC+3:30 (IRST)

Badranlu Rural District (Persian: دهستان بدرانلو) is in the Central District of Bojnord County, North Khorasan province, Iran. Its capital is the village of Badranlu.

== Demographics ==
=== Population ===
At the time of the 2006 National Census, the rural district's population was 20,278 in 5,073 households. There were 23,400 inhabitants in 6,506 households at the following census of 2011. The 2016 census measured the population of the rural district as 23,944 in 6,933 households. The most populous of its 49 villages was Kalateh-ye Pahlvanlu, with 5,038 people.

=== Other villages in the rural district ===
- Bidak
- Burbur
- Dehgah
- Kalateh-ye Shahida Zarsa
- Goli
- Shahrak Tatar
