= List of cities, towns and villages in North Khorasan province =

A list of cities, towns and villages in North Khorasan Province of north-eastern Iran:

== Alphabetical ==
Cities are in bold text; all others are villages.

=== A ===
Ab Barik | Ab Chur | Abbasabad | Abbasabad | Abdabad | Abdollahabad | Abdollahabad | Abeh Mohammadjan | Abri Tappeh | Adineh Qoli | Adkan | Agh Mazar | Aghjeh | Ahvan Cultivation and Husbandry Centre | Ajarpazy Jajrom Integrated Furnace | Ajqan | Akbarabad | Alashlu | Alast-e Olya | Alast-e Sofla | Ali Khan Qaleh | Aliabad | Aliabad | Aliabad-e Alu | Aliabad-e Qarah Chay | Aligol | Alishah | Alkhas | Allah Verdi Khan | Allahabad-e Olya | Allahabad-e Sofla | Amanabad | Amand | Amanli | Aminabad | Aminabad | Amirabad | Amirabad | Amirabad | Amirabad | Amiriyeh | Anabay | Anbarabad | Anduqan | Ansar | Anushirvan | Aq Bagh | Aq Cheshmeh | Aq Qaleh | Aq Qaleh | Aq Tappeh | Aqazadeh | Aqech | Arab | Araqi | Ardin | Ark | Ark | Arkan | Armud Aqachi | Armudlu | Arnaveh | Asadli | Asgharabad | Asharf ol Eslam | Ashkhaneh | Ashraf Darreh | Aspakhu | Astain | Atimoz | Atrabad-e Olya | Atrabad-e Sofla | Ava | Azad Gan | Azizabad

=== B ===
Baba Aman | Baba Cheshmeh | Baba Qodrat | Bacheh Darreh | Badamloq | Badranlu | Bagh Mahalleh | Bagh | Baghan | Baghcheq | Bagheshjerd | Baghi | Baghleq | Bahar-e Olya | Bahar-e Sofla | Balqoli-ye Kohneh | Bam | Bam | Band-e Yaghmur | Bani Dar | Baranabad | Barastu | Barazarlu | Barbar Qaleh | Bargard | Barzali | Barzaneh | Barzu | Bash Kalateh | Bash Mahalleh | Baz Khaneh | Bazanaj | Bazareh-ye Qarnas | Behkadeh-ye Razavi | Bekrabad | Besh Darreh | Beyk | Beyk Pulad | Beyramabad | Bi Bahreh | Biar-e Kord | Bidak | Bidak | Bidvaz | Bigan | Biraq-e Olya | Biraq-e Sofla | Bishabad | Bojnord | Bolqan-e Olya | Bolqan-e Sofla | Borj | Borj | Borj-e Aqa | Borj-e Zanganlu | Borj-e Zavalfaqar | Borzelan-e Olya | Borzelan-e Sofla | Borzolabad | Buanlu | Burbur | Buyaqoli

=== C ===
Chah Mutur Ali Ebn Abi Talib | Chah Talekh | Chahal Gazer | Chahar Bagh | Chahar Bid | Chahar Borj | Chahar Borj-e Olya | Chahar Borj-e Sofla | Chahar Chubeh | Chahar Kharvar | Chahar Mast | Chakhmaqlu | Chal Bash | Chalu | Chaman-e-Bid | Chapanlu | Chapeh | Chaqan | Charmeh | Chehel Dokhtaran | Chehel Hesar | Chenaran | Cheri | Cherik | Cheshmeh Khan | Cheshmeh Tabari | Cheshmeh | Chowchik Ab | Chukanlu | Chukanlu | Chupli Tappeh | Churchuri

=== D ===
Dadeh Khan | Dahaneh-ye Ojaq | Dahaneh-ye Shirin | Daleq Tappeh | Dalijan-e Kordha | Dalijan-e Torkiyeh | Damdami | Danj | Dar Parchin-e Olya | Dar Parchin-e Sofla | Dar Sufian | Daraghanlu | Daraq | Darband Esfejir | Darband | Darband | Darband | Darkesh | Dartum | Dashli Qaleh | Dasht Gorgan | Dasht | Dashtak-e Olya | Dashtak-e Sofla | Dastjerd | Dehgah | Dehik | Derazpey | Devin | Do Ab | Do Borjeh | Dongal | Dowlatabad | Dowleh Danlu | Dowri | Dulchah | Dulu | Duydukh-e Olya

=== E ===
Ehsanabad | Eivar | Emam Darreh | Emam Verdi | Emarat | Emarat | Eqreqayeh | Esfarayen | Esfejir | Esferuj | Esfid | Esfidan | Esfidan | Eshqabad | Eslamabad | Eslamabad-e Karkhaneh-ye Qand | Eslamabad-e Kord | Estarkhi | Estarkhi

=== F ===
Fajirabad | Fakhr ol Din | Farah Din | Farhadan | Fariman | Fartan-e Kohneh | Fartan-e Tazeh | Faruj | Fathabad | Fazel Allah Khan Agrigultural Institute | Feyzabad | Firuzabad | Firuzeh | Firuziyeh

=== G ===
Ganjdan | Gappaz | Gar Gaz | Garah Zu | Garati | Gargaz-e Tazeh Yal | Garmab | Garmab | Garmab | Garmak | Garmak | Garmeh | Garmeh Khush | Garmkhan | Gaz Bashi | Gaz Kuh | Gaz | Gazabad | Gazrabi | Gerivan | Gesk | Ghamiteh | Gholaman | Ghuzeh Zan | Gifan-e Bala | Gifan-e Pain | Goli | Golian | Golmandarreh | Gom Eshaq | Gonbadli | Gowdali Sallakh | Gug Darreh | Gugeli | Gugul | Gurpan | Guy Nik

=== H ===
Hajji Abd ol Vahhab | Hajji Gholamreza | Hajji Taqi | Halqeh Sang | Halva Cheshmeh | Hamid | Hamzak | Hamzanlu | Hanuzi | Hasan Mast | Hasan Su | Hasanabad | Hasanabad | Hasanabad | Hasanabad | Hasanabad-e Chenar Sukhteh | Hasht Markh | Havar | Hebsabad | Hesar Andaf | Hesar | Hesarcheh | Hesarcheh-ye Pain | Hesar-e Devin | Hesar-e Garmkhan | Hesar-e Honameh | Hesar-e Isa | Hesar-e Kazimabad | Hesar-e Kordha | Hesar-e Pahlavanlu | Hesar-e Shah Verdi Khan | Hesar-e Teymur Tash | Hesari | Hesari-ye Gazerani | Heydarabad | Honameh | Hoseynabad | Hoseynabad-e Khankowr | Hoseynabad-e Kordha

=== I ===
Incheh-ye Olya | Incheh-ye Sofla | Injanlu | Inji | Iraj | Isa Bagh | Istgah-e Jajarm | Izi | Izman-e Bala | Izman-e Pain

=== J ===
Jafarabad | Jafarabad | Jafarabad-e Sofla | Jahan | Jajrom | Jammi | Jan Ahmadi | Jangah | Janjalabad | Joghdi | Jolof Darreh | Jorbat | Jowshaqan | Jowzak | Jowzaqeh | Judar | Jushqan

=== K ===
Kabutar Khaneh | Kacharanlu | Kaj Bid | Kakoli | Kalab | Kalantar | Kalat | Kalateh Shah Mir | Kalateh-ye Abbas Javini | Kalateh-ye Abrisham | Kalateh-ye Alimardan | Kalateh-ye Allah Qoli | Kalateh-ye Anamusi | Kalateh-ye Aqa Nabi | Kalateh-ye Ashian | Kalateh-ye At Ali | Kalateh-ye Bahar | Kalateh-ye Bali | Kalateh-ye Bam | Kalateh-ye Baqer Khan Seh | Kalateh-ye Bashim | Kalateh-ye Baz | Kalateh-ye Bozorg | Kalateh-ye Chenar | Kalateh-ye Fathallah | Kalateh-ye Firuzeh | Kalateh-ye Ghamu | Kalateh-ye Habib | Kalateh-ye Hajj Rahmat | Kalateh-ye Hajji Ali Akbar | Kalateh-ye Hasan Qoli | Kalateh-ye Hendi | Kalateh-ye Jafarabad | Kalateh-ye Khvosh | Kalateh-ye Mansurabad | Kalateh-ye Mastufi | Kalateh-ye Mirza Abbas | Kalateh-ye Mirza Rahim | Kalateh-ye Mohammad Reza Khan | Kalateh-ye Molla Aziz | Kalateh-ye Molla Gholamhoseyn | Kalateh-ye Muri | Kalateh-ye Naqi | Kalateh-ye Nazar Ali | Kalateh-ye Nazar Mohammad | Kalateh-ye Nish Kesh | Kalateh-ye Pahlvanlu | Kalateh-ye Pialeh | Kalateh-ye Reza | Kalateh-ye Sadat | Kalateh-ye Safdarabad | Kalateh-ye Sanjar | Kalateh-ye Shahida Zarsa | Kalateh-ye Shiru | Kalateh-ye Shoqan | Kalateh-ye Shur | Kalateh-ye Shur | Kalateh-ye Siah Dasht | Kalateh-ye Sohrab | Kalateh-ye Sufizadeh | Kalateh-ye Tashi | Kalateh-ye Torkha | Kalateh-ye Yavari | Kalateh-ye Zaman Sufi | Kalateh-ye Zaman | Kalayen | Kaltamanlu | Karimabad-e Olya | Kariz | Kariz | Karizdar | Karkhaneh-ye Qand-e Shirvan | Karkuli | Karposhtli-ye Baghi | Karposhtli-ye Olya | Kashanak | Kashkabad | Kastan | Kavaki | Kerik | Kesreq | Khabushan | Khadami Fajirabad | Khalajlu | Khaledabad | Khan Laq | Khandaqlu | Kharaq | Kharashah | Khartut | Khattab | Khattab | Kheyrabad | Kheyrabad | Kheyrabad | Khoda Qoli | Khorramabad | Khorramdeh-e Gharbi | Khorramdeh-e Sharqi | Khosraviyeh | Khush Manzar | Khushin | Khvajehha | Ki Ki | Kikanlu | Kilu Panjeh | Kohneh Jolgeh | Kohneh Kan | Korf | Korki | Kotalli | Kuh Kamar | Kuh Qaleh | Kuran | Kuran-e Kordiyeh | Kuran-e Torkiyeh | Kurkanlu-ye Olya | Kurkanlu-ye Sofla | Kuseh | Kushkandar | Kushki Kikanlu | Kushki Raji | Kushki Torkaman | Kushki

=== L ===
Langar | Langar | Lujali

=== M ===
Mafranqah | Mahmudi | Maivan | Malkesh | Malvanlu | Mamlejeh | Mangeli-ye Olya | Mangeli-ye Sofla | Mansurabad | Mansuran | Maqsudabad | Maragheh | Mardkanlu | Marghdari Sang-e Sefidi | Marghzar | Marghzar | Marz | Mashhad Torqi-ye Olya | Mashhad Torqi-ye Sofla | Matranlu | Mazarlaq | Mazraeh Bacheh Darreh-ye Olya | Mazraeh Chal Tak Pak | Mazraeh Hamati | Mazraeh Hanarestan | Mazraeh Kashavarzi Shadlu | Mehdiabad | Mehmanak | Mehnan | Mehrabad | Mianzu | Milanlu-ye Olya | Milanlu-ye Sofla | Mir Fazlollah | Mirza Hasanlu | Mohammad Avaz | Mohammad Baradi | Mohammad Durailu | Mohammadabad | Mohammadabad | Mohammadabad | Mohammadabad | Mohammadabad-e Tabar | Molla Baqer | Molla Hasan | Molla Veys | Morghzar | Moshammi

=== N ===
Naderabad | Najaf | Najafabad | Najafabad | Namanlu | Naqab | Naqdu | Naqiabad | Nargeslu-ye Olya | Nargeslu-ye Sofla | Nasrabad | Naveh | Naviar | Neyab | Neyestaneh | Nish Kish | Now Deh Bam | Now Deh

=== O ===
Okhli | Ordaghan | Oshtut-e Bala | Oshtut-e Pain | Ostad Teymurtash | Ostad | Owghaz Kohneh | Owghaz Tazeh | Owzan Bijeh

=== P ===
Pa Qaleh | Padegan Nazami Shahrabad | Pakotal | Palang Darreh | Palkanlu-ye Bala | Palkanlu-ye Pain | Parkanlu | Pas Kuh | Pasandarreh | Pasat Darreh | Paserkanlu | Pashindeh | Paskan | Pighur | Pir Ali | Pir Boz | Pir Shahid | Pireh | Pireh | Pirudanlu | Pish Darreh | Pish Qaleh | Porseh Su-ye Olya | Porseh Su-ye Sofla | Posht-e Bam | Pustin Duz

=== Q ===
Qahremanabad | Qalaj | Qalandar Tappeh | Qaleh Beyg Qarah Cheshmeh | Qaleh Bid | Qaleh Cheh | Qaleh Hasan | Qaleh Joq-e Bozorg | Qaleh Khan | Qaleh Marz | Qaleh Now-ye Anqolabi | Qaleh Ostad | Qaleh Shaban | Qaleh-ye Ali Mohammad | Qaleh-ye Mamu | Qaleh-ye Mohammadi | Qaleh-ye Nur Mohammad | Qaleh-ye Qushin | Qaleh-ye Safa | Qaleh-ye Sefid | Qaleh-ye Tut | Qaleh-ye Zu | Qanbar Baghi | Qapaq | Qarah Aqaj | Qarah Aqaj-e Bala | Qarah Aqaj-e Pain | Qarah Bashlu | Qarah Chah | Qarah Chay | Qarah Cheh Robat | Qarah Gol | Qarah Jangal-e Olya | Qarah Jeqqeh | Qarah Khan Bandi | Qarah Mosali | Qarah Parcheq | Qarah Qanlu | Qarah Qanlu | Qarajeh | Qarayeh Seydnur | Qareh Bater | Qareh Cheshmeh | Qareh Kanlu | Qareh Now Deh | Qarloq | Qarzi Karji | Qarzi | Qasem Khan | Qasemabad | Qasr-e Qajar | Qatlish-ye Olya | Qatlish-ye Sofla | Qavolqa | Qazaqi | Qazi | Qazi | Qazi | Qazi-ye Sofla | Qeli | Qeshlaq | Qeshlaq-e Kareh | Qeshlaq-e Naveh | Qesti Moaven | Qezel Hesar | Qezel Hesar-e Bala | Qezel Hesar-e Pain | Qezel Qaleh-ye Bala | Qezel Qaleh-ye Pain | Qezel | Qezelqan | Qezlar | Qolhak-e Olya | Qolhak-e Sofla | Qoppoz | Quch Qaleh-ye Olya | Quch Qar | Qulanlu-ye Olya | Qulanlu-ye Sofla | Qurdanlu | Quri Darreh | Qush Khaneh | Qush Tappeh | Quynanlu Bamir

=== R ===
Rahim Dad | Rahimabad | Rahimabad | Rahmatabad | Rain | Rakhtian | Rashvanlu | Rashvanlu | Rashvanlu | Rasteqan | Ravokh | Raz | Razmeghan | Rezaabad | Rezaabad | Rezqabad | Rezqaneh | Rizeh | Robat | Robat-e Eshq | Robat-e Qarah Bil | Rostamabad | Ruin | Rustai Hajj Hoseyn

=== S ===
Sadeqabad | Safiabad | Sakhli Ilman | Sandalabad | Sangchin | Sangli-ye Shirin | Sangli-ye Shur | Sangsar | Sankhvast | Sar Cheshmeh | Sar Cheshmeh | Sar Cheshmeh | Sarani | Sardab | Sarkanlu | Sarmaran | Sast | Seh Gonbad | Senjed | Serivan Asheqan | Serivan Tappeh | Sevaldi | Seyu Khosavi Anqolab | Seyu Khosavi Hashem | Seyyedabad | Shabli | Shah Ojaq | Shahrabad-e Khavar | Shahrabad-e Kord | Shahrak Tatar | Shahrak-e Qaem | Shahrak-e Qaleh Juq-e Bozorg | Shahrak-e Qarah Lar | Shanaqi-ye Olya | Shanaqi-ye Sofla | Shaqeh | Shatut | Sherkanlu | Shesh Khaneh | Sheykh Teymur | Sheykh | Shirabad | Shirabad | Shirghan | Shiruyeh | Shirvan | Shokranlu | Shokranlu | Shoqan | Showqabad | Shur Su | Shurak | Shurak-e Bala | Shur-e Bala | Shur-e Sofla | Shurik-e Abdabad | Sinan | Sir Separanlu-ye Olya | Sir Separanlu-ye Sofla | Sisab | Sokkeh | Soleymanabad | Soluli | Sorkh Cheshmeh | Sorkh Qaleh | Sorkh Qaleh-ye Kordha | Sorkh Zu | Sugtali | Suqeh

=== T ===
Tabar | Tabarian | Tabrian | Taftazan | Tajik | Takht | Takht-e Mish | Taklah Quz | Tanasvan | Tangeh-ye Raz | Tangeh-ye Torkaman | Taraqi Tork | Taraqi-ye Kord | Tarjali | Tarkheh | Tarnik | Tarqi-ye Sofla | Tash Nafas | Tatar | Tazeh Qaleh | Tazeh Qaleh | Tazeh Yab | Tirsazi Power Plant | Titkanlu | Tomato Paste Plant | Toranlu | Tudeh | Tukur | Tup Chenar | Tupkanlu | Tutli-ye Olya | Tutli-ye Sofla | Tuy

=== U ===
Ulu

=== V ===
Valiabad | Valiabad | Varaqi | Varg

=== Y ===
Yalanchi | Yam | Yan Bolagh | Yar Cheli | Yarom Gonbad | Yasrabad | Yazdanabad | Yekkeh Shakh | Yekkeh Soud-e Olya | Yekkeh Soud-e Sofla | Yengeh Qaleh | Yengi Qaleh | Yengi Qaleh-ye Bala | Yengi Qaleh-ye Kasbair | Yengi Qaleh-ye Pain | Yengi Qaleh-ye Shahrak | Yeylaq | Yomuq

=== Z ===
Zafarabad | Zali | Zamanabad | Zanaft | Zard | Zari | Zarneh | Zartanlu | Zavarom | Zeydar | Zeynekanlu | Ziarat | Zindanlu | Zirkuh Gaduganlu | Zu | Zu-ye Olya
