= Yengi Qaleh =

Yengi Qaleh or Yengeh Qaleh or Yangi Qaleh (Persian: ينگه قلعه) may refer to:

- Yengi Qaleh, Hamadan
- Yengi Qaleh, Markazi
- Yengi Qaleh, Bojnord, North Khorasan
- Yengeh Qaleh, Faruj, North Khorasan
- Yengi Qaleh-ye Bala, North Khorasan
- Yengi Qaleh-ye Pain, North Khorasan
- Yengi Qaleh, Qazvin
- Yengi Qaleh, Razavi Khorasan
- Yengi Qaleh, Kalat, Razavi Khorasan
- Yengeh Qaleh, Razavi Khorasan
- Yengi Qaleh-ye Kasbair, North Khorasan
- Yengi Qaleh-ye Shahrak, North Khorasan
