= Soluli =

Village in North Khorasan province, Iran

Soluli Persian: سلولي
- Village
- Location within Iran
- Coordinates: 37°41′32″N 57°16′36″E
- Country: Iran
- Province: North Khorasan
- County: Bojnord
- District: Garmkhan
- Rural District: Garmkhan

Population (2016)
  - Total: 1,155
- Time zone: UTC+3:30 (IRST)

Soluli (Persian: سلولي) (Note: Also romanized as Solūlī) is a village in Garmkhan Rural District of Garmkhan District in Bojnord County, North Khorasan province, Iran.

== Demographics ==
=== Population ===
At the time of the 2006 National Census, the village's population was 1,616 in 347 households. The following census in 2011 counted 1,415 people in 381 households. The 2016 census measured the population of the village as 1,155 people in 315 households.
