= Ali Khan Qaleh =

Ali Khan Qaleh عليخانقلعه
- Village
- Location within Iran
- Coordinates: 37°34′00″N 57°39′50″E
- Country: Iran
- Province: North Khorasan
- County: Shirvan
- Bakhsh: Sarhad
- Rural District: Takmaran

Population (2006)
  - Total: 787
- Time zone: UTC+3:30 (IRST)
  - Summer (DST): UTC+4:30 (IRDT)

Ali Khan Qaleh (Persian: عليخانقلعه, also Romanized as ‘Alī Khān Qal‘eh; also known as Alkhān Kārā, Alkhan Qara, and Bashkanlu) is a village in Takmaran Rural District, Sarhad District, Shirvan County, North Khorasan Province, Iran. At the 2006 census, its population was 787, in 188 families.
