= Bagh Mahalleh =

Bagh Mahalleh باغ محله
- Village
- Location within Iran
- Coordinates: 37°04′13″N 58°08′02″E
- Country: Iran
- Province: North Khorasan
- County: Faruj
- Bakhsh: Central
- Rural District: Faruj

Population (2006)
  - Total: 238
- Time zone: UTC+3:30 (IRST)
  - Summer (DST): UTC+4:30 (IRDT)

Bagh Mahalleh (Persian: باغ محله, also Romanized as Bāgh Maḩalleh) is a village in Faruj Rural District, in the Central District of Faruj County, North Khorasan Province, Iran. At the 2006 census, its population was 238, in 54 families.
