= Qarloq Castle =

Castle in North Khorasan Province, Iran

Qarloq castle
- قلعه قارلق

General information
- Type: Castle
- Location: Bojnord County, Iran

Qarloq castle (Persian: قلعه قارلق) is a historical castle located in Bojnord County in North Khorasan Province. The longevity of this fortress dates back to the Middle Ages Historical periods after Islam.
