= Qasr-e Qajar =

Qasr-e Qajar قصرقجر
- Village
- Location within Iran
- Coordinates: 37°36′06″N 57°11′18″E
- Country: Iran
- Province: North Khorasan
- County: Bojnord
- Bakhsh: Central
- Rural District: Badranlu

Population (2006)
  - Total: 564
- Time zone: UTC+3:30 (IRST)
  - Summer (DST): UTC+4:30 (IRDT)

Qasr-e Qajar (Persian: قصرقجر, also Romanized as Qaşr-e Qajar) is a village in Badranlu Rural District, in the Central District of Bojnord County, North Khorasan Province, Iran. At the 2006 census, its population was 564, in 148 families.
