= Palkanlu-ye Bala =

Palkanlu-ye Bala پالكانلوبالا
- Village
- Location within Iran
- Coordinates: 37°41′14″N 57°53′37″E
- Country: Iran
- Province: North Khorasan
- County: Shirvan
- Bakhsh: Sarhad
- Rural District: Jirestan

Population (2006)
  - Total: 343
- Time zone: UTC+3:30 (IRST)
  - Summer (DST): UTC+4:30 (IRDT)

Palkanlu-ye Bala (Persian: پالكانلوبالا, also Romanized as Pālkānlū-ye Bālā and Pālkānlū Bālā; also known as Pālkānlū-ye ‘Olyā and Pālkānlū ‘Alūkhān) is a village in Jirestan Rural District, Sarhad District, Shirvan County, North Khorasan Province, Iran. At the 2006 census, its population was 343, in 74 families.
