= Khoda Qoli, North Khorasan =

Village in North Khorasan province, Iran

Khoda Qoli Persian: خداقلي
- Village
- Location within Iran
- Coordinates: 37°26′20″N 57°19′06″E
- Country: Iran
- Province: North Khorasan
- County: Bojnord
- District: Central
- Rural District: Aladagh

Population (2016)
  - Total: 1,638
- Time zone: UTC+3:30 (IRST)

Khoda Qoli (Persian: خداقلي) (Note: Also romanized as Khodā Qolī; formerly known as Shahpasand (شاه‌پسند); also known as Khodā Qolīhā and Khuda Quli) is a village in Aladagh Rural District of the Central District in Bojnord County, North Khorasan province, Iran.

== Demographics ==
=== Population ===
At the time of the 2006 National Census, the village's population was 665 in 165 households. The following census in 2011 counted 1,272 people in 359 households. The 2016 census measured the population of the village as 1,638 people in 479 households.
