= Pa Qaleh, North Khorasan =

Pa Qaleh پاقلعه
- Village
- Location within Iran
- Coordinates: 37°23′20″N 57°19′48″E
- Country: Iran
- Province: North Khorasan
- County: Bojnord
- Bakhsh: Central
- Rural District: Aladagh

Population (2006)
  - Total: 112
- Time zone: UTC+3:30 (IRST)
  - Summer (DST): UTC+4:30 (IRDT)

Pa Qaleh (Persian: پاقلعه, also Romanized as Pā Qal‘eh) is a village in Aladagh Rural District, in the Central District of Bojnord County, North Khorasan Province, Iran. At the 2006 census, its population was 112, in 31 families.
