= Beyramabad, North Khorasan =

Beyramabad بيرم اباد
- Village
- Location within Iran
- Coordinates: 37°00′03″N 58°16′47″E
- Country: Iran
- Province: North Khorasan
- County: Faruj
- Bakhsh: Central
- Rural District: Sangar

Population (2006)
  - Total: 190
- Time zone: UTC+3:30 (IRST)
  - Summer (DST): UTC+4:30 (IRDT)

Beyramabad (Persian: بيرم اباد, also Romanized as Beyrāmābād and Bayrāmābād) is a village in Sangar Rural District, in the Central District of Faruj County, North Khorasan Province, Iran. At the 2006 census, its population was 190, in 45 families.
