= Shirghan =

Shirghan شيرغان
- Village
- Location within Iran
- Coordinates: 37°03′38″N 58°11′44″E
- Country: Iran
- Province: North Khorasan
- County: Faruj
- Bakhsh: Central
- Rural District: Sangar

Population (2006)
  - Total: 140
- Time zone: UTC+3:30 (IRST)
  - Summer (DST): UTC+4:30 (IRDT)

Shirghan (Persian: شيرغان, also Romanized as Shīrghān) is a village in Sangar Rural District, in the Central District of Faruj County, North Khorasan Province, Iran. At the 2006 census, its population was 140, in 47 families.
