= Kalateh-ye Hajji Ali Akbar =

Kalateh-ye Hajji Ali Akbar كلاته حاجي علي اكبر
- Village
- Location within Iran
- Coordinates: 37°47′10″N 57°20′33″E
- Country: Iran
- Province: North Khorasan
- County: Bojnord
- Bakhsh: Garmkhan
- Rural District: Gifan

Population (2006)
  - Total: 396
- Time zone: UTC+3:30 (IRST)
  - Summer (DST): UTC+4:30 (IRDT)

Kalateh-ye Hajji Ali Akbar (Persian: كلاته حاجي علي اكبر, also Romanized as Kalāteh-ye Ḩājjī ʿAlī Āḵbar; also known as Shahraḵ Qal‘eh-ye Ḩaq Kūcheḵ and Qal‘eh Jūq-e Kūchak) is a village in Gifan Rural District, Garmkhan District, Bojnord County, North Khorasan Province, Iran. At the 2006 census, its population was 396, in 83 families.
