= Shahrak-e Qarah Lar =

Shahrak-e Qarah Lar شهرك قره لر
- Village
- Country: Iran
- Province: North Khorasan
- County: Bojnord
- Bakhsh: Garmkhan
- Rural District: Garmkhan

Population (2006)
  - Total: 549
- Time zone: UTC+3:30 (IRST)
  - Summer (DST): UTC+4:30 (IRDT)

Shahrak-e Qarah Lar (Persian: شهرك قره لر, also Romanized as Shahraḵ-e Qarah Lar) is a village in Garmkhan Rural District, Garmkhan District, Bojnord County, North Khorasan Province, Iran. At the 2006 census, its population was 549, in 119 families.
