= Hesar-e Shah Verdi Khan =

Hesar-e Shah Verdi Khan حصارشاهورديخان
- Village
- Location within Iran
- Coordinates: 37°18′40″N 57°09′11″E
- Country: Iran
- Province: North Khorasan
- County: Bojnord
- Bakhsh: Central
- Rural District: Aladagh

Population (2006)
  - Total: 1,040
- Time zone: UTC+3:30 (IRST)
  - Summer (DST): UTC+4:30 (IRDT)

Hesar-e Shah Verdi Khan (Persian: حصارشاهورديخان, also Romanized as Ḩeşār-e Shāh Verdī Khān; also known as Ḩeşār-e Ḩoseynī) is a village in Aladagh Rural District, in the Central District of Bojnord County, North Khorasan Province, Iran. At the 2006 census, its population was 1,040, in 258 families.
