= Kalateh-ye Mastufi =

Kalateh-ye Mastufi كلاته مستوفي
- Village
- Country: Iran
- Province: North Khorasan
- County: Bojnord
- Bakhsh: Central
- Rural District: Badranlu

Population (2006)
  - Total: 78
- Time zone: UTC+3:30 (IRST)
  - Summer (DST): UTC+4:30 (IRDT)

Kalateh-ye Mastufi (Persian: كلاته مستوفي, also Romanized as Kalāteh-ye Mastūfī) is a village in Badranlu Rural District, in the Central District of Bojnord County, North Khorasan Province, Iran. At the 2006 census, its population was 78, in 25 families.
