= Pirudanlu =

Pirudanlu پيرودانلو
- Village
- Location within Iran
- Coordinates: 37°36′58″N 58°07′31″E
- Country: Iran
- Province: North Khorasan
- County: Shirvan
- Bakhsh: Central
- Rural District: Sivkanlu

Population (2006)
  - Total: 98
- Time zone: UTC+3:30 (IRST)
  - Summer (DST): UTC+4:30 (IRDT)

Pirudanlu (Persian: پيرودانلو, also Romanized as Pīrūdānlū; also known as Pīr Dūlū) is a village in Sivkanlu Rural District, in the Central District of Shirvan County, North Khorasan Province, Iran. At the 2006 census, its population was 98, in 26 families.
