= Ab Chur =

Ab Chur ابچور
- Village
- Location within Iran
- Coordinates: 37°23′33″N 57°25′27″E
- Country: Iran
- Province: North Khorasan
- County: Bojnord
- Bakhsh: Central
- Rural District: Aladagh

Population (2006)
  - Total: 437
- Time zone: UTC+3:30 (IRST)
  - Summer (DST): UTC+4:30 (IRDT)

Ab Chur (Persian: ابچور, also Romanized as Āb Chūr and Ābchowr; also known as Āpkhvor) is a village in Aladagh Rural District, in the Central District of Bojnord County, North Khorasan Province, Iran. At the 2006 census, its population was 437, in 106 families.
