= Feyzabad, North Khorasan =

Feyzabad فيض اباد
- Village
- Location within Iran
- Coordinates: 37°17′29″N 58°08′40″E
- Country: Iran
- Province: North Khorasan
- County: Shirvan
- Bakhsh: Central
- Rural District: Howmeh

Population (2006)
  - Total: 305
- Time zone: UTC+3:30 (IRST)
  - Summer (DST): UTC+4:30 (IRDT)

Feyzabad (Persian: فيض اباد, also Romanized as Feyẕābād and Faizābād) is a village in Howmeh Rural District, in the Central District of Shirvan County, North Khorasan Province, Iran. At the 2006 census, its population was 305, in 77 families.
