= Halqeh Sang =

Halqeh Sang حلقه سنگ
- Village
- Location within Iran
- Coordinates: 37°27′02″N 57°18′45″E
- Country: Iran
- Province: North Khorasan
- County: Bojnord
- Bakhsh: Central
- Rural District: Aladagh

Population (2006)
  - Total: 748
- Time zone: UTC+3:30 (IRST)
  - Summer (DST): UTC+4:30 (IRDT)

Halqeh Sang (Persian: حلقه سنگ, also Romanized as Ḩalqeh Sang) is a village in Aladagh Rural District, in the Central District of Bojnord County, North Khorasan Province, Iran. At the 2006 census, its population was 748, in 169 families.
