= Kalateh-ye Bali =

Kalateh Bali كلاته بالی
- Village
- Location within Iran
- Coordinates: 37°34′24″N 58°11′55″E
- Country: Iran
- Province: North Khorasan
- County: Shirvan
- Bakhsh: Central
- Rural District: Sivkanlu

Population (2006)
  - Total: 37
- Time zone: UTC+3:30 (IRST)
  - Summer (DST): UTC+4:30 (IRDT)

Kalateh Bali (Persian: كلاته بالی, also Romanized as Kalāteh Bālī; also known as Kalāteh Bālā) is a village in Sivkanlu Rural District, in the Central District of Shirvan County, North Khorasan Province, Iran. At the 2006 census, its population was 37, in 9 families.
