= Kalateh Shah Mir =

Kalateh Shah Mir كلاته شاه مير
- Village
- Location within Iran
- Coordinates: 37°04′25″N 58°02′25″E
- Country: Iran
- Province: North Khorasan
- County: Faruj
- Bakhsh: Central
- Rural District: Faruj

Population (2006)
  - Total: 45
- Time zone: UTC+3:30 (IRST)
  - Summer (DST): UTC+4:30 (IRDT)

Kalateh Shah Mir (Persian: كلاته شاه مير, also Romanized as Kalāteh Shāh Mīr and Kalāteh-ye Shāhmīr) is a village in Faruj Rural District, in the Central District of Faruj County, North Khorasan Province, Iran. At the 2006 census, its population was 45, in 9 families.
