= Gowdali Sallakh =

Gowdali Sallakh گودالي سلاخ
- Village
- Location within Iran
- Coordinates: 37°34′00″N 57°10′48″E
- Country: Iran
- Province: North Khorasan
- County: Bojnord
- Bakhsh: Central
- Rural District: Badranlu

Population (2006)
  - Total: 80
- Time zone: UTC+3:30 (IRST)
  - Summer (DST): UTC+4:30 (IRDT)

Gowdali Sallakh (Persian: گودالي سلاخ, also Romanized as Gowdālī Sallākh; also known as Gowdār Sallāḩ, Godālī-ye Sallākh), and Sallākh is a village in Badranlu Rural District, in the Central District of Bojnord County, North Khorasan Province, Iran. At the 2006 census, its population was 80, in 20 families.
