= Ostad (disambiguation) =

Ustad or Ostad is a professor, teacher, master musician, artist, or scholar.

Ostad may also refer to:

- Ostad, North Khorasan, Iran, a village with a population around 450
- Ostad, Gonabad County, Razavi Khorasan, Iran, a village with a population around 300
- Bakharz, Bakharz County, Razavi Khorasan, Iran (also known as Ostad and Ostad Bakharz), a city with a population around 7000
- Sandra Ostad (born 1990), Norwegian artistic gymnast

== People ==
- Ustad-i-Badshahan, a title referring to Sher Shah Suri by Humayun and the Mughal Empire
- Ustad Ahmad Lahori, architect of the Taj Mahal

== See also ==
- Ostad Teymurtash, North Khorasan Province, Iran, a village with a population around 300
- Ostad Kolayeh, Gilan Province, Iran, a village with a population around 500
- Usted
