= Mamlejeh =

Mamlejeh مملجه
- Village
- Location within Iran
- Coordinates: 37°29′42″N 57°10′14″E
- Country: Iran
- Province: North Khorasan
- County: Bojnord
- Bakhsh: Central
- Rural District: Badranlu

Population (2006)
  - Total: 171
- Time zone: UTC+3:30 (IRST)
  - Summer (DST): UTC+4:30 (IRDT)

Mamlejeh (Persian: مملجه; also known as Mamelīāh) is a village in Badranlu Rural District, in the Central District of Bojnord County, North Khorasan Province, Iran. At the 2006 census, its population was 171, in 46 families.
