= Bash Mahalleh =

Village in North Khorasan province, Iran

Bash Mahalleh Persian: باش محله
- Village
- Location within Iran
- Coordinates: 36°58′58″N 58°07′41″E
- Country: Iran
- Province: North Khorasan
- County: Faruj
- District: Central
- Rural District: Sangar

Population (2016)
  - Total: 427
- Time zone: UTC+3:30 (IRST)

Bash Mahalleh (Persian: باش محله) (Note: Also romanized as Bāsh Maḩaleh and Bāsh Maḩalleh) is a village in Sangar Rural District of the Central District in Faruj County, North Khorasan province, Iran.

== Demographics ==
=== Population ===
At the time of the 2006 National Census, the village's population was 661 in 167 households. The following census in 2011 counted 1,263 people in 309 households. The 2016 census measured the population of the village as 427 people in 157 households.
