= Tabrian, Faruj =

Tabrian تبريان
- Village
- Location within Iran
- Coordinates: 37°02′25″N 58°02′38″E
- Country: Iran
- Province: North Khorasan
- County: Faruj
- Bakhsh: Central
- Rural District: Faruj

Population (2006)
  - Total: 119
- Time zone: UTC+3:30 (IRST)
  - Summer (DST): UTC+4:30 (IRDT)

Tabrian (Persian: تبريان, also Romanized as Ţabrīān, Tabarīan, Tabarīyān, and Tabryān; also known as Tabarīān-e Soflá) is a village in Faruj Rural District, in the Central District of Faruj County, North Khorasan Province, Iran. At the 2006 census, its population was 119, in 31 families.
