= Rezqaneh =

Rezqaneh رزقانه
- Village
- Location within Iran
- Coordinates: 37°51′57″N 57°25′36″E
- Country: Iran
- Province: North Khorasan
- County: Bojnord
- Bakhsh: Garmkhan
- Rural District: Gifan

Population (2006)
  - Total: 417
- Time zone: UTC+3:30 (IRST)
  - Summer (DST): UTC+4:30 (IRDT)

Rezqaneh (Persian: رزقانه, also Romanized as Rezqāneh and Razqāneh) is a village in Gifan Rural District, Garmkhan District, Bojnord County, North Khorasan Province, Iran. At the 2006 census, its population was 417, in 91 families.
