= Armud Aqachi =

Village in North Khorasan province, Iran

Armud Aqachi Persian: ارموداقاچي
- Village
- Location within Iran
- Coordinates: 36°58′49″N 58°03′23″E
- Country: Iran
- Province: North Khorasan
- County: Faruj
- District: Central
- Rural District: Sangar

Population (2016)
  - Total: 238
- Time zone: UTC+3:30 (IRST)

Armud Aqachi (Persian: ارموداقاچي) (Note: Also romanized as Ārmūd Āqāchī; also known as Āmūrd Āqāchī, Ārmūd Āghājī, and Ārmūrd Āghājī) is a village in Sangar Rural District of the Central District in Faruj County, North Khorasan province, Iran.

== Demographics ==
=== Population ===
At the time of the 2006 National Census, the village's population was 289 in 68 households. The following census in 2011 counted 271 people in 78 households. The 2016 census measured the population of the village as 238 people in 74 households.
