= Mianzu =

Mianzu ميانزو
- Village
- Location within Iran
- Coordinates: 37°54′27″N 57°19′26″E
- Country: Iran
- Province: North Khorasan
- County: Bojnord
- Bakhsh: Garmkhan
- Rural District: Gifan

Population (2006)
  - Total: 443
- Time zone: UTC+3:30 (IRST)
  - Summer (DST): UTC+4:30 (IRDT)

Mianzu (Persian: ميانزو, also Romanized as Mīānzū, Mīān Zū, Meyānsū, Mīānzow, Miyan Zoo, and Mīyān Zow) is a village in Gifan Rural District, Garmkhan District, Bojnord County, North Khorasan Province, Iran. At the 2006 census, its population was 443, in 118 families.
