= Hesar-e Teymur Tash =

Hesar-e Teymur Tash حصارتيمورتاش
- Village
- Location within Iran
- Coordinates: 37°29′35″N 57°08′17″E
- Country: Iran
- Province: North Khorasan
- County: Bojnord
- Bakhsh: Central
- Rural District: Badranlu

Population (2006)
  - Total: 168
- Time zone: UTC+3:30 (IRST)
  - Summer (DST): UTC+4:30 (IRDT)

Hesar-e Teymur Tash (Persian: حصارتيمورتاش, also Romanized as Ḩeşār-e Teymūr Tāsh; also known as Ma‘şūm ‘Alī, Tehmūrtāsh, and Teymūr Tāsh) is a village in Badranlu Rural District, in the Central District of Bojnord County, North Khorasan Province, Iran. At the 2006 census, its population was 168, in 48 families.
