= Sorkh Zu =

Sorkh Zu سرخ زو
- Village
- Location within Iran
- Coordinates: 37°35′10″N 57°37′19″E
- Country: Iran
- Province: North Khorasan
- County: Shirvan
- Bakhsh: Sarhad
- Rural District: Takmaran

Population (2006)
  - Total: 314
- Time zone: UTC+3:30 (IRST)
  - Summer (DST): UTC+4:30 (IRDT)

Sorkh Zu (Persian: سرخ زو, also Romanized as Sorkh Zū, Sorkh Zow, and Sorkhzū; also known as Sorkheh Zū, Sorkhen Zū, and Surkhzao) is a village in Takmaran Rural District, Sarhad District, Shirvan County, North Khorasan Province, Iran. At the 2006 census, its population was 314, in 78 families.
