= Band-e Yaghmur =

Band-e Yaghmur بنديغمور
- Village
- Location within Iran
- Coordinates: 37°29′00″N 57°32′29″E
- Country: Iran
- Province: North Khorasan
- County: Bojnord
- Bakhsh: Garmkhan
- Rural District: Garmkhan

Population (2006)
  - Total: 520
- Time zone: UTC+3:30 (IRST)
  - Summer (DST): UTC+4:30 (IRDT)

Band-e Yaghmur (Persian: بنديغمور, also Romanized as Band-e Yaghmūr and Band-e Yaqmūr) is a village in Garmkhan Rural District, Garmkhan District, Bojnord County, North Khorasan Province, Iran. At the 2006 census, its population was 520, in 117 families.
