= Mohammad Durailu =

Mohammad Durailu محمددورايلو
- Village
- Location within Iran
- Coordinates: 37°37′40″N 58°04′14″E
- Country: Iran
- Province: North Khorasan
- County: Shirvan
- Bakhsh: Central
- Rural District: Sivkanlu

Population (2006)
  - Total: 32
- Time zone: UTC+3:30 (IRST)
  - Summer (DST): UTC+4:30 (IRDT)

Mohammad Durailu (Persian: محمددورايلو, also Romanized as Moḩammad Dūrāīlū; also known as Moḩammad Dūlū) is a village in Sivkanlu Rural District, in the Central District of Shirvan County, North Khorasan Province, Iran. At the 2006 census, its population was 32, in 9 families.
