= Judar =

Judar جودر
- Village
- Location within Iran
- Coordinates: 37°55′08″N 57°24′05″E
- Country: Iran
- Province: North Khorasan
- County: Bojnord
- Bakhsh: Garmkhan
- Rural District: Gifan

Population (2006)
  - Total: 236
- Time zone: UTC+3:30 (IRST)
  - Summer (DST): UTC+4:30 (IRDT)

Judar (Persian: جودر, also Romanized as Jūdar and Jowdar; also known as Jow Darreh and Chūdar) is a village in Gifan Rural District, Garmkhan District, Bojnord County, North Khorasan province, Iran. At the 2006 census, its population was 236, in 62 families.
