= Khattab, Shirvan =

Khattab خطاب
- Village
- Location within Iran
- Coordinates: 37°30′24″N 57°44′17″E
- Country: Iran
- Province: North Khorasan
- County: Shirvan
- Bakhsh: Central
- Rural District: Ziarat

Population (2006)
  - Total: 226
- Time zone: UTC+3:30 (IRST)
  - Summer (DST): UTC+4:30 (IRDT)

Khattab (Persian: خطاب, also Romanized as Khaţţāb; also known as Khaţţāb-e Bālā) is a village in Ziarat Rural District, in the Central District of Shirvan County, North Khorasan Province, Iran. At the 2006 census, its population was 226, in 58 families.
