= Qaleh-ye Nur Mohammad =

Qaleh-ye Nur Mohammad قلعه نورمحمد
- Village
- Location within Iran
- Coordinates: 36°59′22″N 58°16′08″E
- Country: Iran
- Province: North Khorasan
- County: Faruj
- Bakhsh: Central
- Rural District: Sangar

Population (2006)
  - Total: 120
- Time zone: UTC+3:30 (IRST)
  - Summer (DST): UTC+4:30 (IRDT)

Qaleh-ye Nur Mohammad (Persian: قلعه نورمحمد, also Romanized as Qal‘eh-ye Nūr Moḩammad; also known as Nūrmoḩammad) is a village in Sangar Rural District, in the Central District of Faruj County, North Khorasan Province, Iran. At the 2006 census, its population was 120, in 27 families.
