= Amirabad, Bojnord =

Amirabad اميراباد
- Village
- Location within Iran
- Coordinates: 37°51′18″N 57°21′03″E
- Country: Iran
- Province: North Khorasan
- County: Bojnord
- Bakhsh: Garmkhan
- Rural District: Gifan

Population (2006)
  - Total: 288
- Time zone: UTC+3:30 (IRST)
  - Summer (DST): UTC+4:30 (IRDT)

Amirabad (Persian: اميراباد, also Romanized as Amīrābād) is a village in Gifan Rural District, Garmkhan District, Bojnord County, North Khorasan Province, Iran. At the 2006 census, its population was 288, in 68 families.
