= Qaleh-ye Zu =

Qaleh-ye Zu قلعه زو
- Village
- Location within Iran
- Coordinates: 37°30′52″N 57°47′22″E
- Country: Iran
- Province: North Khorasan
- County: Shirvan
- Bakhsh: Central
- Rural District: Ziarat

Population (2006)
  - Total: 74
- Time zone: UTC+3:30 (IRST)
  - Summer (DST): UTC+4:30 (IRDT)

Qaleh-ye Zu (Persian: قلعه زو, also Romanized as Qal‘eh-ye Zū) is a village in Ziarat Rural District, in the Central District of Shirvan County, North Khorasan Province, Iran. At the 2006 census, its population was 74, in 20 families.
