= Bahar-e Olya =

Bahar-e Olya بهارعليا
- Village
- Location within Iran
- Coordinates: 36°54′01″N 58°09′12″E
- Country: Iran
- Province: North Khorasan
- County: Faruj
- Bakhsh: Central
- Rural District: Sangar

Population (2006)
  - Total: 178
- Time zone: UTC+3:30 (IRST)
  - Summer (DST): UTC+4:30 (IRDT)

Bahar-e Olya (Persian: بهارعليا, also Romanized as Bahār-e ‘Olyā; also known as Bahār-e Bālā) is a village in Sangar Rural District, in the Central District of Faruj County, North Khorasan Province, Iran. At the 2006 census, its population was 178, in 48 families.
