= Quynanlu Bamir =

Quynanlu Bamir قوينانلوبامير
- Village
- Location within Iran
- Coordinates: 37°17′09″N 57°47′31″E
- Country: Iran
- Province: North Khorasan
- County: Shirvan
- Bakhsh: Central
- Rural District: Golian

Population (2006)
  - Total: 91
- Time zone: UTC+3:30 (IRST)
  - Summer (DST): UTC+4:30 (IRDT)

Quynanlu Bamir (Persian: قوينانلوبامير, also Romanized as Qūynānlū Bāmīr, Qūnīānlū Bāmīr, and Qowynānlū-ye Bāmīr; also known as Qū’īnānlū) is a village in Golian Rural District, in the Central District of Shirvan County, North Khorasan Province, Iran. At the 2006 census, its population was 91, in 18 families.
