= Atrabad-e Olya =

Atrabad-ye Olya اترابادعليا
- Village
- Country: Iran
- Province: North Khorasan
- County: Bojnord
- Bakhsh: Central
- Rural District: Badranlu

Population (2006)
  - Total: 108
- Time zone: UTC+3:30 (IRST)
  - Summer (DST): UTC+4:30 (IRDT)

Atrabad-ye Olya (Persian: اترابادعليا, also Romanized as Ātrābād-ye ‘Olyā) is a village in Badranlu Rural District, in the Central District of Bojnord County, North Khorasan Province, Iran. At the 2006 census, its population was 108, in 32 families.
