= Kavaki =

Village in North Khorasan province, Iran

Kavaki Persian: كواكي
- Village
- Location within Iran
- Coordinates: 37°08′19″N 58°06′01″E
- Country: Iran
- Province: North Khorasan
- County: Faruj
- District: Central
- Rural District: Faruj

Population (2016)
  - Total: 563
- Time zone: UTC+3:30 (IRST)

Kavaki (Persian: كواكي) (Note: Also romanized as Kavākī) is a village in Faruj Rural District of the Central District in Faruj County, North Khorasan province, Iran.

== Demographics ==
=== Population ===
At the time of the 2006 National Census, the village's population was 700 in 176 households. The following census in 2011 counted 630 people in 186 households. The 2016 census measured the population of the village as 563 people in 179 households.
