= Neyestaneh =

Neyestaneh نيستانه
- Village
- Location within Iran
- Coordinates: 37°18′26″N 57°13′50″E
- Country: Iran
- Province: North Khorasan
- County: Bojnord
- Bakhsh: Central
- Rural District: Aladagh

Population (2006)
  - Total: 445
- Time zone: UTC+3:30 (IRST)
  - Summer (DST): UTC+4:30 (IRDT)

Neyestaneh (Persian: نيستانه, also Romanized as Neyestāneh) is a village in Aladagh Rural District, in the Central District of Bojnord County, North Khorasan Province, Iran. At the 2006 census, its population was 445, in 117 families.
