= Qazi-ye Sofla =

Qazi-ye Sofla قاضي سفلي
- Village
- Country: Iran
- Province: North Khorasan
- County: Bojnord
- Bakhsh: Garmkhan
- Rural District: Garmkhan

Population (2006)
  - Total: 102
- Time zone: UTC+3:30 (IRST)
  - Summer (DST): UTC+4:30 (IRDT)

Qazi-ye Sofla (Persian: قاضي سفلي, also Romanized as Qāẕī-ye Soflá) is a village in Garmkhan Rural District, Garmkhan District, Bojnord County, North Khorasan Province, Iran. At the 2006 census, its population was 102, in 21 families.
