= Bi Bahreh =

Bi Bahreh بي بهره
- Village
- Location within Iran
- Coordinates: 37°31′45″N 58°07′15″E
- Country: Iran
- Province: North Khorasan
- County: Shirvan
- Bakhsh: Central
- Rural District: Sivkanlu

Population (2006)
  - Total: 578
- Time zone: UTC+3:30 (IRST)
  - Summer (DST): UTC+4:30 (IRDT)

Bi Bahreh (Persian: بي بهره, also Romanized as Bī Bahreh) is a village in Sivkanlu Rural District, in the Central District of Shirvan County, North Khorasan Province, Iran. At the 2006 census, its population was 578, in 134 families.
