= Qarah Gol, North Khorasan =

Qarah Gol قره گل
- Village
- Location within Iran
- Coordinates: 37°02′07″N 58°03′21″E
- Country: Iran
- Province: North Khorasan
- County: Faruj
- Bakhsh: Central
- Rural District: Faruj

Population (2006)
  - Total: 227
- Time zone: UTC+3:30 (IRST)
  - Summer (DST): UTC+4:30 (IRDT)

Qarah Gol (Persian: قره گل, also Romanized as Qareh Gol) is a village in Faruj Rural District, in the Central District of Faruj County, North Khorasan Province, Iran. At the 2006 census, its population was 227, in 59 families.
