= Tatar, North Khorasan =

Tatar تاتار
- Village
- Location within Iran
- Coordinates: 37°31′43″N 57°07′18″E
- Country: Iran
- Province: North Khorasan
- County: Bojnord
- Bakhsh: Central
- Rural District: Badranlu
- Time zone: UTC+3:30 (IRST)
  - Summer (DST): UTC+4:30 (IRDT)

Tatar (Persian: تاتار, also Romanized as Tātār) is a village in Badranlu Rural District, in the Central District of Bojnord County, North Khorasan Province, Iran. Its population was not reported in 2006 census.
