= Qaleh-ye Mamu =

Qaleh-ye Mamu قلعه ممو
- Village
- Location within Iran
- Coordinates: 37°36′53″N 57°09′44″E
- Country: Iran
- Province: North Khorasan
- County: Bojnord
- Bakhsh: Central
- Rural District: Badranlu

Population (2006)
  - Total: 328
- Time zone: UTC+3:30 (IRST)
  - Summer (DST): UTC+4:30 (IRDT)

Qaleh-ye Mamu (Persian: قلعه ممو, also Romanized as Qal‘eh-ye Mamū and Qal‘eh Mamū; also known as Qālāymelyū) is a village in Badranlu Rural District, in the Central District of Bojnord County, North Khorasan Province, Iran. At the 2006 census, its population was 328, in 76 families.
