= Quch Qaleh-ye Olya =

Village in North Khorasan province, Iran

Quch Qaleh-ye Olya Persian: قوچ قلعه عليا
- Village
- Location within Iran
- Coordinates: 37°27′58″N 57°35′58″E
- Country: Iran
- Province: North Khorasan
- County: Bojnord
- District: Garmkhan
- Rural District: Garmkhan

Population (2016)
  - Total: 651
- Time zone: UTC+3:30 (IRST)

Quch Qaleh-ye Olya (Persian: قوچ قلعه عليا) (Note: Also romanized as Qūch Qal‘eh-ye ‘Olyā; also known as Qūch Qal‘eh-ye Bālā, Quch Qalēh-ye Bālā, Qūsh Qal‘eh, and Qūsh Qal‘eh-ye Bālā, and Qūsh Qal‘eh-ye ‘Olyā) is a village in Garmkhan Rural District of Garmkhan District in Bojnord County, North Khorasan province, Iran.

== Demographics ==
=== Population ===
At the time of the 2006 National Census, the village's population was 719 in 158 households. The following census in 2011 counted 743 people in 211 households. The 2016 census measured the population of the village as 651 people in 193 households.
