= Zartanlu =

Zartanlu زرتانلو
- Village
- Location within Iran
- Coordinates: 37°31′35″N 58°08′39″E
- Country: Iran
- Province: North Khorasan
- County: Shirvan
- Bakhsh: Central
- Rural District: Sivkanlu

Population (2006)
  - Total: 392
- Time zone: UTC+3:30 (IRST)
  - Summer (DST): UTC+4:30 (IRDT)

Zortanlu (Persian: زرتانلو, also Romanized as Zartānlū and Zortānlū; also known as Şūfīānlū and Zartanu) is a village in Sivkanlu Rural District, in the Central District of Shirvan County, North Khorasan Province, Iran. At the 2006 census, its population was 392, in 99 families.
