= Shah Ojaq =

Shah Ojaq شاه اجاق
- Village
- Location within Iran
- Coordinates: 37°42′24″N 57°17′25″E
- Country: Iran
- Province: North Khorasan
- County: Bojnord
- Bakhsh: Garmkhan
- Rural District: Garmkhan

Population (2006)
  - Total: 543
- Time zone: UTC+3:30 (IRST)
  - Summer (DST): UTC+4:30 (IRDT)

Shah Ojaq (Persian: شاه اجاق, also Romanized as Shāh Ojāq) is a village in Garmkhan Rural District, Garmkhan District, Bojnord County, North Khorasan Province, Iran. At the 2006 census, its population was 543, in 106 families.
