= Yarom Gonbad =

Yarom Gonbad يارم گنبد
- Village
- Location within Iran
- Coordinates: 37°02′39″N 58°12′27″E
- Country: Iran
- Province: North Khorasan
- County: Faruj
- Bakhsh: Central
- Rural District: Sangar

Population (2006)
  - Total: 87
- Time zone: UTC+3:30 (IRST)
  - Summer (DST): UTC+4:30 (IRDT)

Yarom Gonbad (Persian: يارم گنبد, also Romanized as Yārom Gonbad) is a village in Sangar Rural District, in the Central District of Faruj County, North Khorasan Province, Iran. At the 2006 census, its population was 87, in 20 families.
