= Shokranlu, Howmeh =

Shokranlu شكرانلو
- Village
- Location within Iran
- Coordinates: 37°26′23″N 58°07′30″E
- Country: Iran
- Province: North Khorasan
- County: Shirvan
- Bakhsh: Central
- Rural District: Howmeh

Population (2006)
  - Total: 41
- Time zone: UTC+3:30 (IRST)
  - Summer (DST): UTC+4:30 (IRDT)

Shokranlu (Persian: شكرانلو, also Romanized as Shokrānlū; also known as Tūlkī) is a village in Howmeh Rural District, in the Central District of Shirvan County, North Khorasan Province, Iran. At the 2006 census, its population was 41, in 16 families.
