= Paserkanlu =

Paserkanlu پسركانلو
- Village
- Location within Iran
- Coordinates: 37°31′43″N 57°11′51″E
- Country: Iran
- Province: North Khorasan
- County: Bojnord
- Bakhsh: Central
- Rural District: Badranlu

Population (2006)
  - Total: 307
- Time zone: UTC+3:30 (IRST)
  - Summer (DST): UTC+4:30 (IRDT)

Paserkanlu (Persian: پسركانلو, also Romanized as Paserkānlū; also known as Basurkanlu) is a village in Badranlu Rural District, in the Central District of Bojnord County, North Khorasan Province, Iran. At the 2006 census, its population was 307, in 77 families.
