= Kaltamanlu =

Kaltamanlu كالتمانلو
- Village
- Location within Iran
- Coordinates: 37°41′10″N 58°02′30″E
- Country: Iran
- Province: North Khorasan
- County: Shirvan
- Bakhsh: Sarhad
- Rural District: Jirestan

Population (2006)
  - Total: 192
- Time zone: UTC+3:30 (IRST)
  - Summer (DST): UTC+4:30 (IRDT)

Kaltamanlu (Persian: كالتمانلو, also Romanized as Kāltāmānlū and Qāltamānlū) is a village in Jirestan Rural District, Sarhad District, Shirvan County, North Khorasan Province, Iran. At the 2006 census, its population was 192, in 39 families.
