= Kalateh-ye Pahlvanlu =

Village in North Khorasan province, Iran

Kalateh-ye Pahlvanlu Persian: كلاته پهلوانلو
- Village
- Location within Iran
- Coordinates: 37°30′11″N 57°19′00″E
- Country: Iran
- Province: North Khorasan
- County: Bojnord
- District: Central
- Rural District: Badranlu

Population (2016)
  - Total: 5,038
- Time zone: UTC+3:30 (IRST)

Kalateh-ye Pahlvanlu (Persian: كلاته پهلوانلو) (Note: Also romanized as Kalāteh-ye Pahlvānlū) is a village in Badranlu Rural District of the Central District in Bojnord County, North Khorasan province, Iran.

== Demographics ==
=== Population ===
At the time of the 2006 National Census, the village's population was 1,340 in 329 households. The following census in 2011 counted 3,799 people in 989 households. The 2016 census measured the population of the village as 5,038 people in 1,373 households, the most populous in its rural district.
