= Qurdanlu =

Qurdanlu قوردانلو
- Village
- Location within Iran
- Coordinates: 37°38′05″N 57°58′09″E
- Country: Iran
- Province: North Khorasan
- County: Shirvan
- Bakhsh: Sarhad
- Rural District: Takmaran

Population (2006)
  - Total: 97
- Time zone: UTC+3:30 (IRST)
  - Summer (DST): UTC+4:30 (IRDT)

Qurdanlu (Persian: قوردانلو, also Romanized as Qūrdānlū; also known as Qūrdānlū-ye ‘Olyā) is a village in Takmaran Rural District, Sarhad District, Shirvan County, North Khorasan Province, Iran. At the 2006 census, its population was 97, in 29 families.
