= Gug Darreh =

Gug Darreh گوگ دره
- Village
- Location within Iran
- Coordinates: 37°02′49″N 58°10′41″E
- Country: Iran
- Province: North Khorasan
- County: Faruj
- Bakhsh: Central
- Rural District: Sangar

Population (2006)
  - Total: 125
- Time zone: UTC+3:30 (IRST)
  - Summer (DST): UTC+4:30 (IRDT)

Gug Darreh (Persian: گوگ دره, also Romanized as Gūg Darreh) is a village in Sangar Rural District, in the Central District of Faruj County, North Khorasan Province, Iran. At the 2006 census, its population was 125, in 32 families.
