= Rizeh =

Village in North Khorasan province, Iran

Rizeh Persian: ريزه
- Village
- Location within Iran
- Coordinates: 37°06′14″N 58°03′57″E
- Country: Iran
- Province: North Khorasan
- County: Faruj
- District: Central
- Rural District: Faruj

Population (2016)
  - Total: 203
- Time zone: UTC+3:30 (IRST)

Rizeh (Persian: ريزه) (Note: Also romanized as Rīzeh) is a village in Faruj Rural District of the Central District in Faruj County, North Khorasan province, Iran.

== Demographics ==
=== Population ===
At the time of the 2006 National Census, the village's population was 386 in 86 households. The following census in 2011 counted 281 people in 75 households. The 2016 census measured the population of the village as 203 people in 69 households.
