= Aligol =

Aligol علي گل
- Village
- Location within Iran
- Coordinates: 37°18′16″N 57°14′43″E
- Country: Iran
- Province: North Khorasan
- County: Bojnord
- Bakhsh: Central
- Rural District: Aladagh

Population (2006)
  - Total: 822
- Time zone: UTC+3:30 (IRST)
  - Summer (DST): UTC+4:30 (IRDT)

Aligol (Persian: علي گل, also Romanized as ‘Alīgol, ‘Alīkal, and ‘Alīkol; also known as Qal‘eh-ye ‘Alī Kal and Qal‘eh-ye Alīgol) is a village in Aladagh Rural District, in the Central District of Bojnord County, North Khorasan Province, Iran. At the 2006 census, its population was 822, in 209 families.
