= Zeynekanlu =

Zeynekanlu زينكانلو
- Village
- Location within Iran
- Coordinates: 37°02′46″N 58°05′54″E
- Country: Iran
- Province: North Khorasan
- County: Faruj
- Bakhsh: Central
- Rural District: Faruj

Population (2006)
  - Total: 186
- Time zone: UTC+3:30 (IRST)
  - Summer (DST): UTC+4:30 (IRDT)

Zeynekanlu (Persian: زينكانلو, also Romanized as Zeynekānlū and Zenīkānlū) is a village in Faruj Rural District, in the Central District of Faruj County, North Khorasan Province, Iran. The 2006 census recorded the population as 186, split within 49 families.
