= Qoshun Castle =

Castle in North Khorasan Province, Iran

Qoshun castle
- قلعه قشون

General information
- Type: Castle
- Location: Bojnord County, Iran

Qoshun castle (Persian: قلعه قشون) is a historical castle located in Bojnord County in North Khorasan Province, The longevity of this fortress dates back to the Middle Ages Historical periods after Islam.
