= Soleymanabad, North Khorasan =

Soleymanabad سليمان اباد
- Village
- Location within Iran
- Coordinates: 37°10′43″N 58°11′28″E
- Country: Iran
- Province: North Khorasan
- County: Faruj
- Bakhsh: Central
- Rural District: Faruj

Population (2006)
  - Total: 85
- Time zone: UTC+3:30 (IRST)
  - Summer (DST): UTC+4:30 (IRDT)

Soleymanabad (Persian: سليمان اباد, also Romanized as Soleymānābād) is a village in Faruj Rural District, in the Central District of Faruj County, North Khorasan Province, Iran. At the 2006 census, its population was 85, in 27 families.
