= Pireh =

Pireh or Bireh (Persian: پيره) may refer to:

- Pireh, Faruj
- Pireh, Shirvan
