= Sangchin, North Khorasan =

Sangchin سنگ چين
- Village
- Location within Iran
- Coordinates: 37°15′00″N 57°50′00″E
- Country: Iran
- Province: North Khorasan
- County: Shirvan
- Bakhsh: Central
- Rural District: Golian

Population (2006)
  - Total: 195
- Time zone: UTC+3:30 (IRST)
  - Summer (DST): UTC+4:30 (IRDT)

Sangchin (Persian: سنگ چين, also Romanized as Sangchīn) is a village in Golian Rural District, in the Central District of Shirvan County, North Khorasan Province, Iran. At the 2006 census, its population was 195, in 42 families.
