= Maragheh (disambiguation) =

Maragheh is a city in East Azerbaijan Province, Iran.

Maragheh (Persian: مراغه) may also refer to:

- Maragheh, Markazi
- Maragheh, North Khorasan
- Maragheh, Razavi Khorasan
- Maragheh County, in East Azerbaijan Province
- Maragheh Khanate
