= Palkanlu-ye Pain =

Palkanlu-ye Pain پالكانلوپائين
- Village
- Location within Iran
- Coordinates: 37°41′01″N 57°55′26″E
- Country: Iran
- Province: North Khorasan
- County: Shirvan
- Bakhsh: Sarhad
- Rural District: Jirestan

Population (2006)
  - Total: 403
- Time zone: UTC+3:30 (IRST)
  - Summer (DST): UTC+4:30 (IRDT)

Palkanlu-ye Pain (Persian: پالكانلوپائين, also Romanized as Pālkānlū-ye Pā’īn; also known as Pālkānlū-ye Soflá) is a village in Jirestan Rural District, Sarhad District, Shirvan County, North Khorasan Province, Iran. At the 2006 census, its population was 403, in 91 families.
