= Hajji Abd ol Vahhab =

Hajji Abd ol Vahhab حاجي عبدالوهاب /حاجي رمضان /
- Village
- Location within Iran
- Coordinates: 37°53′53″N 57°23′41″E
- Country: Iran
- Province: North Khorasan
- County: Bojnord
- Bakhsh: Garmkhan
- Rural District: Gifan

Population (2006)
  - Total: 477
- Time zone: UTC+3:30 (IRST)
  - Summer (DST): UTC+4:30 (IRDT)

Hajji Abd ol Vahhab (Persian: حاجي عبدالوهاب /حاجي رمضان /, also Romanized as Ḩājjī ‘Abd ol Vahhāb; also known as Hāj Abdolvāhāb, Ḩājj ‘Abd ol Vahhāb, Qal‘eh-ye Ḩājj Rameẕān, and Ḩājjī Rameẕān) is a village in Gifan Rural District, Garmkhan District, Bojnord County, North Khorasan Province, Iran. At the 2006 census, its population was 477, in 131 families.
