= Zafarabad, North Khorasan =

Zafarabad ظفر اباد
- Village
- Location within Iran
- Coordinates: 37°40′27″N 57°34′03″E
- Country: Iran
- Province: North Khorasan
- County: Shirvan
- Bakhsh: Sarhad
- Rural District: Takmaran

Population (2006)
  - Total: 790
- Time zone: UTC+3:30 (IRST)
  - Summer (DST): UTC+4:30 (IRDT)

Zafarabad (Persian: ظفر اباد, also Romanized as Z̧afarābād; also known as Sardārābād) is a village in Takmaran Rural District, Sarhad District, Shirvan County, North Khorasan Province, Iran. At the 2006 census, its population was 790, in 173 families.
