= Qapaq =

Qapaq قاپاق
- Village
- Location within Iran
- Coordinates: 37°17′56″N 57°15′34″E
- Country: Iran
- Province: North Khorasan
- County: Bojnord
- Bakhsh: Central
- Rural District: Aladagh

Population (2006)
  - Total: 168
- Time zone: UTC+3:30 (IRST)
  - Summer (DST): UTC+4:30 (IRDT)

Qapaq (Persian: قاپاق, also Romanized as Qāpāq) is a village in Aladagh Rural District, in the Central District of Bojnord County, North Khorasan Province, Iran. A 2006 census records the population as 168 and 35 families.
