= Serivan Asheqan =

Village in North Khorasan, Iran

Serivan Asheqan سريوان عاشقان
- Village
- Location within Iran
- Coordinates: 37°34′52″N 57°03′45″E
- Country: Iran
- Province: North Khorasan
- County: Bojnord
- Bakhsh: Central
- Rural District: Badranlu

Population (2006)
  - Total: 191
- Time zone: UTC+3:30 (IRST)
  - Summer (DST): UTC+4:30 (IRDT)

Serivan Asheqan (Persian: سريوان عاشقان, also Romanized as Serīvān ‘Āsheqān) is a village in Badranlu Rural District, in the Central District of Bojnord County, North Khorasan Province, Iran. At the 2006 census, its population was 191, in 54 families.
