= Kalateh-ye Nazar Ali =

Village in North Khorasan province, Iran

Kalateh-ye Nazar Ali Persian: كلاته نظرعلي
- Village
- Location within Iran
- Coordinates: 37°43′03″N 57°56′06″E
- Country: Iran
- Province: North Khorasan
- County: Shirvan
- District: Sarhad
- Rural District: Jirestan

Population (2016)
  - Total: 477
- Time zone: UTC+3:30 (IRST)

Kalateh-ye Nazar Ali (Persian: كلاته نظرعلي) (Note: Also romanized as Kalāteh-ye Naz̧ar ‘Alī; also known as Naz̧ar ‘Alī) is a village in Jirestan Rural District of Sarhad District in Shirvan County, North Khorasan province, Iran.

== Demographics ==
=== Population ===
At the time of the 2006 National Census, the village's population was 646 in 146 households. The following census in 2011 counted 562 people in 161 households. The 2016 census measured the population of the village as 477 people in 142 households.
