= Qeshlaq-e Kareh =

Qeshlaq-e Kareh قشلاق كاره
- Village
- Location within Iran
- Coordinates: 37°29′00″N 57°41′00″E
- Country: Iran
- Province: North Khorasan
- County: Bojnord
- Bakhsh: Garmkhan
- Rural District: Garmkhan

Population (2006)
  - Total: 278
- Time zone: UTC+3:30 (IRST)
  - Summer (DST): UTC+4:30 (IRDT)

Qeshlaq-e Kareh (Persian: قشلاق كاره, also Romanized as Qeshlāq-e Kāreh) is a village in Garmkhan Rural District, Garmkhan District, Bojnord County, North Khorasan Province, Iran. At the 2006 census, its population was 278, in 63 families.
