= Chapanlu =

Chapanlu چپانلو
- Village
- Location within Iran
- Coordinates: 37°30′01″N 58°12′25″E
- Country: Iran
- Province: North Khorasan
- County: Shirvan
- Bakhsh: Central
- Rural District: Sivkanlu

Population (2006)
  - Total: 149
- Time zone: UTC+3:30 (IRST)
  - Summer (DST): UTC+4:30 (IRDT)

Chapanlu (Persian: چپانلو, also Romanized as Chapānlū; also known as Chappeh and Chapeh) is a village in Sivkanlu Rural District, in the Central District of Shirvan County, North Khorasan Province, Iran. At the 2006 census, its population was 149, in 47 families.
