= Malkesh =

Malkesh ملكش
- person name
- Location within Iran
- Coordinates: 37°27′18″N 57°18′38″E
- Country: Iran
- Province: North Khorasan
- County: Bojnord
- Bakhsh: Central
- Rural District: Aladagh

Population (2006)
  - Total: 2,766
- Time zone: UTC+3:30 (IRST)
  - Summer (DST): UTC+4:30 (IRDT)

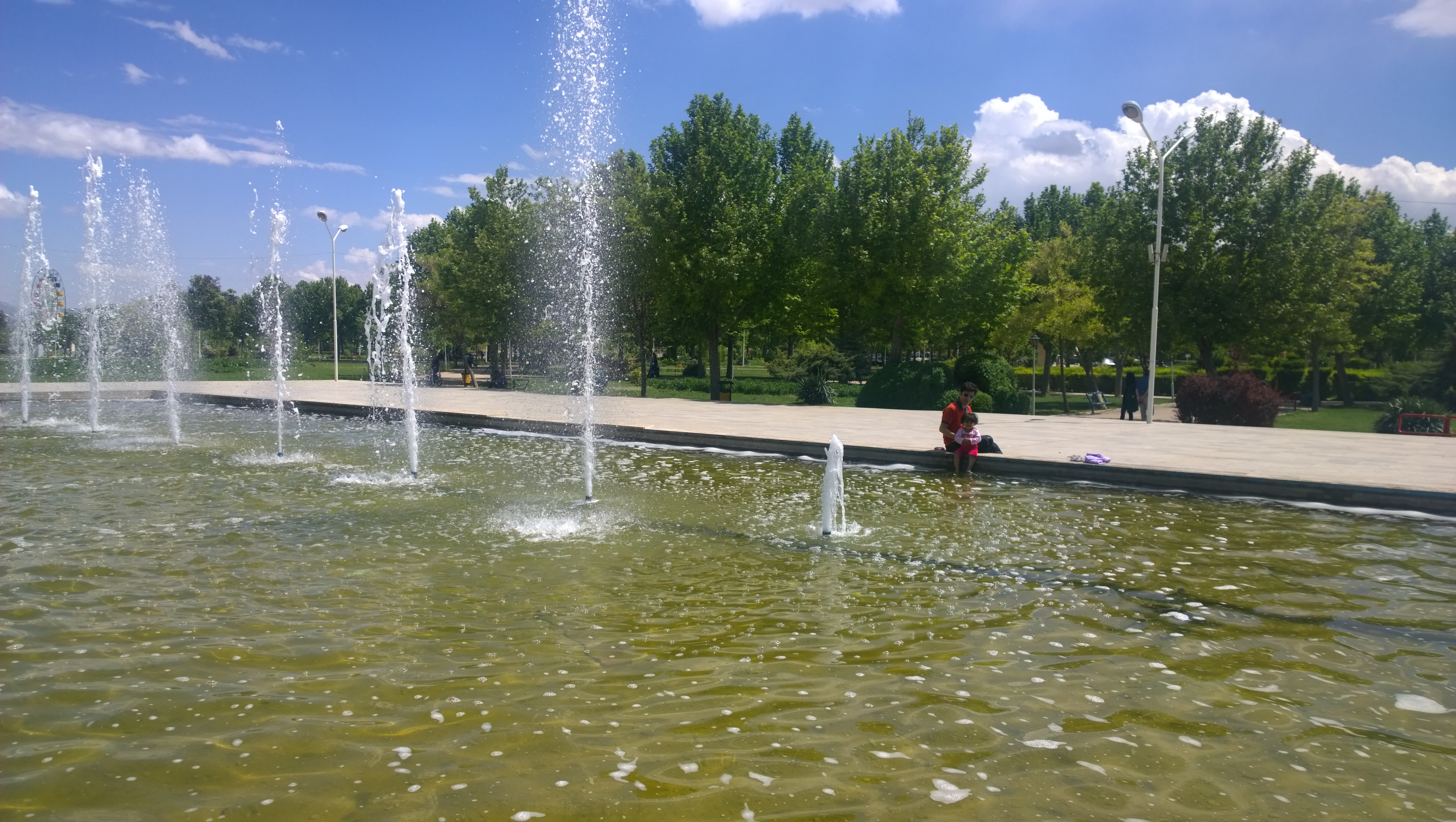
Fountains in Malkesh

Malkesh (Persian: ملكش; also known as Māhesh) is a village in Aladagh Rural District, in the Central District of Bojnord County, North Khorasan Province, Iran. At the 2006 census, its population was 2,766, in 681 families.
