= Qarah Khan Bandi =

Village in North Khorasan province, Iran

Qarah Khan Bandi Persian: قره خان بندي
- Village
- Location within Iran
- Coordinates: 37°30′31″N 57°30′07″E
- Country: Iran
- Province: North Khorasan
- County: Bojnord
- District: Garmkhan
- Rural District: Garmkhan

Population (2016)
  - Total: 615
- Time zone: UTC+3:30 (IRST)

Qarah Khan Bandi (Persian: قره خان بندي) (Note: Also romanized as Qarah Khān Bandī) is a village in Garmkhan Rural District of Garmkhan District in Bojnord County, North Khorasan province, Iran.

== Demographics ==
=== Population ===
At the time of the 2006 National Census, the village's population was 653 in 170 households. The following census in 2011 counted 692 people in 206 households. The 2016 census measured the population of the village as 615 people in 197 households.
