= Ehsanabad, North Khorasan =

Ehsanabad احسان اباد
- Village
- Location within Iran
- Coordinates: 36°56′06″N 58°15′46″E
- Country: Iran
- Province: North Khorasan
- County: Faruj
- Bakhsh: Central
- Rural District: Sangar

Population (2006)
  - Total: 224
- Time zone: UTC+3:30 (IRST)
  - Summer (DST): UTC+4:30 (IRDT)

Ehsanabad (Persian: احسان اباد, also Romanized as Eḩsānābād; also known as Anqūrtī) is a village in Sangar Rural District, in the Central District of Faruj County, North Khorasan Province, Iran. At the 2006 census, its population was 224, in 50 families.
