= Zindanlu =

Zindanlu زيندانلو
- Village
- Location within Iran
- Coordinates: 37°41′15″N 58°03′00″E
- Country: Iran
- Province: North Khorasan
- County: Shirvan
- Bakhsh: Sarhad
- Rural District: Jirestan

Population (2006)
  - Total: 131
- Time zone: UTC+3:30 (IRST)
  - Summer (DST): UTC+4:30 (IRDT)

Zindanlu (Persian: زيندانلو, also Romanized as Zīndānlū and Zenīdānlū; also known as Zeyvānlū) is a village in Jirestan Rural District, Sarhad District, Shirvan County, North Khorasan Province, Iran. At the 2006 census, its population was 131, in 30 families.
