= Naqdu =

Naqdu نقدو
- village
- Location within Iran
- Coordinates: 37°37′35″N 58°06′11″E
- Country: Iran
- Province: North Khorasan
- County: Shirvan
- Bakhsh: Central
- Rural District: Sivkanlu
- Elevation: 1,783 m (5,850 ft)

Population (2006)
  - Total: 184
- Time zone: UTC+3:30 (IRST)
  - Summer (DST): UTC+4:30 (IRDT)

Naqdu (Persian: نقدو, also Romanized as Naqdū) is a village in Sivkanlu Rural District, in the Central District of Shirvan County, North Khorasan Province, Iran. At the 2006 census, its population was 184, in 37 families.
