= Toranlu =

Toranlu ترانلو
- Village
- Location within Iran
- Coordinates: 37°35′38″N 58°10′02″E
- Country: Iran
- Province: North Khorasan
- County: Shirvan
- Bakhsh: Central
- Rural District: Sivkanlu

Population (2006)
  - Total: 437
- Time zone: UTC+3:30 (IRST)
  - Summer (DST): UTC+4:30 (IRDT)

Toranlu (Persian: ترانلو, also Romanized as Torānlū, Tarānlū, and Terānlū) is a village in Sivkanlu Rural District, in the Central District of Shirvan County, North Khorasan Province, Iran. As of the 2006 census, the population of the village was 437, spread across 84 families.
