= Mafranqah =

Village in North Khorasan province, Iran

Mafranqah Persian: مفرنقاه
- Village
- Location within Iran
- Coordinates: 37°12′01″N 58°10′51″E
- Country: Iran
- Province: North Khorasan
- County: Faruj
- District: Central
- Rural District: Faruj

Population (2016)
  - Total: 738
- Time zone: UTC+3:30 (IRST)

Mafranqah (Persian: مفرنقاه) (Note: Also romanized as Mafranqāh; also known as Mafranqā, Marfanqā, and Merafneqā) is a village in Faruj Rural District of the Central District in Faruj County, North Khorasan province, Iran.

== Demographics ==
=== Population ===
At the time of the 2006 National Census, the village's population was 715 in 183 households. The following census in 2011 counted 766 people in 221 households. The 2016 census measured the population of the village as 738 people in 211 households.
