= Sar Cheshmeh, Shirvan =

Sar Cheshmeh سرچشمه
- Village
- Location within Iran
- Coordinates: 37°17′14″N 58°00′07″E
- Country: Iran
- Province: North Khorasan
- County: Shirvan
- Bakhsh: Central
- Rural District: Howmeh

Population (2006)
  - Total: 364
- Time zone: UTC+3:30 (IRST)
  - Summer (DST): UTC+4:30 (IRDT)

Sar Cheshmeh (Persian: سرچشمه, also Romanized as Sar Chashmeh) is a village in Howmeh Rural District, in the Central District of Shirvan County, North Khorasan Province, Iran. At the 2006 census, its population was 364, in 100 families.
