= Yazdanabad, North Khorasan =

Yazdanabad يزدان اباد
- Village
- Location within Iran
- Coordinates: 37°54′39″N 57°34′38″E
- Country: Iran
- Province: North Khorasan
- County: Bojnord
- Bakhsh: Garmkhan
- Rural District: Gifan

Population (2006)
  - Total: 185
- Time zone: UTC+3:30 (IRST)
  - Summer (DST): UTC+4:30 (IRDT)
- Area code: 9457187339

Yazdanabad (Persian: يزدان اباد, also Romanized as Yazdānābād) is a village in Gifan Rural District, Garmkhan District, Bojnord County, North Khorasan Province, Iran. At the 2006 census, its population was 185, in 50 families.
