= Yan Bolagh =

Yan Bolagh or Yanbolagh (Persian: يانبلاغ) may refer to:

- Yan Bolagh, Ardabil
- Yanbolagh, East Azerbaijan
- Yan Bolagh, Golestan
- Yan Bolagh, North Khorasan
- Yan Bolagh, Razavi Khorasan
