= Pas Kuh =

Pas Kuh پس كوه
- Village
- Location within Iran
- Coordinates: 37°33′03″N 58°04′43″E
- Country: Iran
- Province: North Khorasan
- County: Shirvan
- Bakhsh: Central
- Rural District: Sivkanlu

Population (2006)
  - Total: 115
- Time zone: UTC+3:30 (IRST)
  - Summer (DST): UTC+4:30 (IRDT)

Pas Kuh (Persian: پس كوه, also Romanized as Pas Kūh; also known as Khers Kānlū) is a village in Sivkanlu Rural District, in the Central District of Shirvan County, North Khorasan Province, Iran. At the 2006 census, its population was 115, in 25 families.
