= Malvanlu =

Village in North Khorasan province, Iran

Malvanlu Persian: ملوانلو
- Village
- Location within Iran
- Coordinates: 37°42′33″N 58°00′44″E
- Country: Iran
- Province: North Khorasan
- County: Shirvan
- District: Sarhad
- Rural District: Jirestan

Population (2016)
  - Total: 442
- Time zone: UTC+3:30 (IRST)

Malvanlu (Persian: ملوانلو) (Note: Also romanized as Malvānlū) is a village in Jirestan Rural District of Sarhad District in Shirvan County, North Khorasan province, Iran.

== Demographics ==
=== Population ===
At the time of the 2006 National Census, the village's population was 543 in 102 households. The following census in 2011 counted 546 people in 133 households. The 2016 census measured the population of the village as 442 people in 115 households.
