= Qazi, Gifan =

Qazi قاضي
- Village
- Location within Iran
- Coordinates: 37°50′49″N 57°19′00″E
- Country: Iran
- Province: North Khorasan
- County: Bojnord
- Bakhsh: Garmkhan
- Rural District: Gifan

Population (2006)
  - Total: 250
- Time zone: UTC+3:30 (IRST)
  - Summer (DST): UTC+4:30 (IRDT)

Qazi (Persian: قاضي, also Romanized as Qāẕī; also known as Qāzī Qal‘eh) is a village in Gifan Rural District, Garmkhan District, Bojnord County, North Khorasan Province, Iran. At the 2006 census, its population was 250, in 56 families.
