= Mardkanlu =

Mardkanlu مردكانلو
- Village
- Location within Iran
- Coordinates: 37°02′16″N 58°04′42″E
- Country: Iran
- Province: North Khorasan
- County: Faruj
- Bakhsh: Central
- Rural District: Faruj

Population (2006)
  - Total: 110
- Time zone: UTC+3:30 (IRST)
  - Summer (DST): UTC+4:30 (IRDT)

Mardkanlu (Persian: مردكانلو, also Romanized as Mardkānlū and Mardakānlū; also known as Mehdī Kānlū) is a village in Faruj Rural District, in the Central District of Faruj County, North Khorasan Province, Iran. At the 2006 census, its population was 110, in 32 families.
