= Bolqan-e Sofla =

Bolqan-e Sofla بلقان سفلي
- Village
- Location within Iran
- Coordinates: 37°10′30″N 57°54′25″E
- Country: Iran
- Province: North Khorasan
- County: Shirvan
- Bakhsh: Central
- Rural District: Golian

Population (2006)
  - Total: 153
- Time zone: UTC+3:30 (IRST)
  - Summer (DST): UTC+4:30 (IRDT)

Bolqan-e Sofla (Persian: بلقان سفلي, also Romanized as Bolqān-e Soflá; also known as Bolqān-e Pā’īn) is a village in Golian Rural District, in the Central District of Shirvan County, North Khorasan Province, Iran. At the 2006 census, its population was 153, in 37 families.
