= Marghzar, Shirvan =

Marghzar مرغزار
- Village
- Location within Iran
- Coordinates: 37°25′35″N 58°09′00″E
- Country: Iran
- Province: North Khorasan
- County: Shirvan
- Bakhsh: Central
- Rural District: Howmeh

Population (2006)
  - Total: 179
- Time zone: UTC+3:30 (IRST)
  - Summer (DST): UTC+4:30 (IRDT)

Marghzar (Persian: مرغزار, also Romanized as Marghzār and Morghzār; also known as Marchzār) is a village in Howmeh Rural District, in the Central District of Shirvan County, North Khorasan Province, Iran. At the 2006 census, its population was 179, in 44 families.
