= Dowleh Danlu =

Dowleh Danlu دوله دانلو
- Village
- Location within Iran
- Coordinates: 37°39′58″N 57°56′28″E
- Country: Iran
- Province: North Khorasan
- County: Shirvan
- Bakhsh: Sarhad
- Rural District: Jirestan

Population (2006)
  - Total: 39
- Time zone: UTC+3:30 (IRST)
  - Summer (DST): UTC+4:30 (IRDT)

Dowleh Danlu (Persian: دوله دانلو, also Romanized as Dowleh Dānlū, Dowladānlū, Dowladānlu, and Dūledānlū; also known as Dowlū) is a village in Jirestan Rural District, Sarhad District, Shirvan County, North Khorasan Province, Iran. At the 2006 census, its population was 39, in 6 families.
