= Rakhtian =

Rakhtian رختيان
- Village
- Location within Iran
- Coordinates: 37°17′34″N 57°09′48″E
- Country: Iran
- Province: North Khorasan
- County: Bojnord
- Bakhsh: Central
- Rural District: Aladagh

Population (2006)
  - Total: 1,080
- Time zone: UTC+3:30 (IRST)
  - Summer (DST): UTC+4:30 (IRDT)

Rakhtian (Persian: رختيان, also Romanized as Rakhtīān, Rakhteyān, and Rakhtīyān) is a village in Aladagh Rural District, in the Central District of Bojnord County, North Khorasan Province, Iran. At the 2006 census, its population was 1,080, in 219 families.
