= Qaleh Marz =

Qaleh Marz قلعه مرز
- Village
- Location within Iran
- Coordinates: 37°31′43″N 57°28′32″E
- Country: Iran
- Province: North Khorasan
- County: Bojnord
- Bakhsh: Central
- Rural District: Aladagh

Population (2006)
  - Total: 119
- Time zone: UTC+3:30 (IRST)
  - Summer (DST): UTC+4:30 (IRDT)

Qaleh Marz (Persian: قلعه مرز, also Romanized as Qal‘eh Marz) is a village in Aladagh Rural District, in the Central District of Bojnord County, North Khorasan Province, Iran. At the 2006 census, its population was 119, in 32 families.
