= Mirza Hasanlu =

Mirza Hasanlu ميرزاحسن لو
- Village
- Location within Iran
- Coordinates: 37°25′47″N 57°19′13″E
- Country: Iran
- Province: North Khorasan
- County: Bojnord
- Bakhsh: Central
- Rural District: Aladagh

Population (2006)
  - Total: 89
- Time zone: UTC+3:30 (IRST)
  - Summer (DST): UTC+4:30 (IRDT)

Mirza Hasanlu (Persian: ميرزاحسن لو, also Romanized as Mīrzā Ḩasanlū) is a village in Aladagh Rural District, in the Central District of Bojnord County, North Khorasan Province, Iran. At the 2006 census, its population was 89, in 20 families.
