= Sandalabad =

Village in North Khorasan province, Iran

Sandalabad Persian: سندل اباد
- Village
- Location within Iran
- Coordinates: 37°26′56″N 57°20′30″E
- Country: Iran
- Province: North Khorasan
- County: Bojnord
- District: Central
- Rural District: Aladagh

Population (2016)
  - Total: 4,354
- Time zone: UTC+3:30 (IRST)

Sandalabad (Persian: سندل اباد) (Note: Also romanized as Sandalābād) is a village in Aladagh Rural District of the Central District in Bojnord County, North Khorasan province, Iran.

== Demographics ==
=== Population ===
At the time of the 2006 National Census, the village's population was 1,839 in 409 households. The following census in 2011 counted 3,344 people in 868 households. The 2016 census measured the population of the village as 4,354 people in 1,120 households. It was the most populous village in its rural district.
