= Garmkhan =

Garmkhan گرمخان
- Village
- Location within Iran
- Coordinates: 37°31′45″N 57°28′46″E
- Country: Iran
- Province: North Khorasan
- County: Bojnord
- Bakhsh: Garmkhan
- Rural District: Garmkhan

Population (2006)
  - Total: 310
- Time zone: UTC+3:30 (IRST)
  - Summer (DST): UTC+4:30 (IRDT)

Garmkhan (Persian: گرمخان, also Romanized as Garmkhān, Garm Khān and Garma Khān) is a village in Garmkhan Rural District, Garmkhan District, Bojnord County, North Khorasan Province, Iran. At the 2006 census, its population was 310, in 77 families.
