= Qareh Kanlu, North Khorasan =

Qareh Kanlu قره كانلو
- Village
- Location within Iran
- Coordinates: 37°35′15″N 57°08′12″E
- Country: Iran
- Province: North Khorasan
- County: Bojnord
- Bakhsh: Central
- Rural District: Badranlu

Population (2006)
  - Total: 504
- Time zone: UTC+3:30 (IRST)
  - Summer (DST): UTC+4:30 (IRDT)

Qareh Kanlu (Persian: قره كانلو, also Romanized as Qareh Kānlū, Qarīkanlū, and Qorīkānlū; also known as Rīkānlū) is a village in Badranlu Rural District, in the Central District of Bojnord County, North Khorasan Province, Iran. At the 2006 census, its population was 504, in 116 families.
