= Farhadan =

Farhadan فرهادان
- Village
- Location within Iran
- Coordinates: 37°00′12″N 58°15′29″E
- Country: Iran
- Province: North Khorasan
- County: Faruj
- Bakhsh: Central
- Rural District: Sangar

Population (2006)
  - Total: 138
- Time zone: UTC+3:30 (IRST)
  - Summer (DST): UTC+4:30 (IRDT)

Farhadan (Persian: فرهادان, also Romanized as Farhādān and Farhādīān) is a village in Sangar Rural District, in the Central District of Faruj County, North Khorasan Province, Iran. At the 2006 census, its population was 138, in 30 families.

== See also ==
- Tali Farhadian, Iranian-born American former federal prosecutor and 2021 candidate for New York County District Attorney
