= Kalateh-ye Hendi =

Kalateh-ye Hendi كلاته هندي
- Village
- Location within Iran
- Coordinates: 37°24′18″N 58°03′34″E
- Country: Iran
- Province: North Khorasan
- County: Shirvan
- Bakhsh: Central
- Rural District: Howmeh

Population (2006)
  - Total: 102
- Time zone: UTC+3:30 (IRST)
  - Summer (DST): UTC+4:30 (IRDT)

Kalateh-ye Hendi (Persian: كلاته هندي, also Romanized as Kalāteh-ye Hendī) is a village in Howmeh Rural District, in the Central District of Shirvan County, North Khorasan Province, Iran. At the 2006 census, its population was 102, in 28 families.
