= Alkhas =

Village in North Khorasan province, Iran

Alkhas Persian: الخاص
- Village
- Location within Iran
- Coordinates: 37°43′13″N 57°57′51″E
- Country: Iran
- Province: North Khorasan
- County: Shirvan
- District: Sarhad
- Rural District: Jirestan

Population (2016)
  - Total: 458
- Time zone: UTC+3:30 (IRST)

Alkhas (Persian: الخاص) (Note: Also romanized as Ālkhāş; also known as Alkhāş Qal‘eh) is a village in Jirestan Rural District of Sarhad District in Shirvan County, North Khorasan province, Iran.

== Demographics ==
=== Population ===
At the time of the 2006 National Census, the village's population was 455 in 106 households. The following census in 2011 counted 368 people in 100 households. The 2016 census measured the population of the village as 458 people in 123 households.
