= Amirabad, Faruj =

Village in North Khorasan province, Iran

Amirabad Persian: اميراباد
- Village
- Location within Iran
- Coordinates: 36°54′34″N 58°14′22″E
- Country: Iran
- Province: North Khorasan
- County: Faruj
- District: Central
- Rural District: Sangar

Population (2016)
  - Total: 325
- Time zone: UTC+3:30 (IRST)

Amirabad (Persian: اميراباد) (Note: Also romanized as Amīrābād) is a village in Sangar Rural District of the Central District in Faruj County, North Khorasan province, Iran.

== Demographics ==
=== Population ===
At the time of the 2006 National Census, the village's population was 412 in 92 households. The following census in 2011 counted 410 people in 102 households. The 2016 census measured the population of the village as 325 people in 97 households.
