= Namanlu =

Village in North Khorasan province, Iran

Namanlu Persian: نامانلو
- Village
- Location within Iran
- Coordinates: 37°40′32″N 58°05′50″E
- Country: Iran
- Province: North Khorasan
- County: Shirvan
- District: Sarhad
- Rural District: Jirestan

Population (2016)
  - Total: 707
- Time zone: UTC+3:30 (IRST)

Namanlu (Persian: نامانلو) (Note: Also romanized as Nāmānlū) is a village in Jirestan Rural District of Sarhad District in Shirvan County, North Khorasan province, Iran.

== Demographics ==
=== Population ===
At the time of the 2006 National Census, the village's population was 638 in 150 households. The following census in 2011 counted 522 people in 134 households. The 2016 census measured the population of the village as 707 people in 233 households, the most populous in its rural district.
