= Mansuran =

Mansuran منصوران
- Village
- Location within Iran
- Coordinates: 37°27′02″N 57°52′22″E
- Country: Iran
- Province: North Khorasan
- County: Shirvan
- Bakhsh: Central
- Rural District: Ziarat

Population (2006)
  - Total: 119
- Time zone: UTC+3:30 (IRST)
  - Summer (DST): UTC+4:30 (IRDT)

Mansuran (Persian: منصوران, also Romanized as Manşūrān; also known as Manşūr) is a village in the Ziarat Rural District, Central District of Shirvan County, North Khorasan Province, Iran. In the 2006 census, its population was 119, in 30 families.
