= Khalajlu =

Khalajlu خلاجلو
- Village
- Location within Iran
- Coordinates: 37°37′45″N 58°02′58″E
- Country: Iran
- Province: North Khorasan
- County: Shirvan
- Bakhsh: Central
- Rural District: Sivkanlu

Population (2006)
  - Total: 159
- Time zone: UTC+3:30 (IRST)
  - Summer (DST): UTC+4:30 (IRDT)

Khalajlu (Persian: خلاجلو, also Romanized as Khalājlū; also known as Khalājū and Khallājlū Daqdū) is a village in Sivkanlu Rural District, in the Central District of Shirvan County, North Khorasan Province, Iran. At the 2006 census, its population was 159, in 34 families.
