= Dartum =

Village in North Khorasan province, Iran

Dartum Persian: درتوم
- Village
- Location within Iran
- Coordinates: 37°17′30″N 57°18′18″E
- Country: Iran
- Province: North Khorasan
- County: Bojnord
- District: Central
- Rural District: Aladagh

Population (2016)
  - Total: 1,074
- Time zone: UTC+3:30 (IRST)

Dartum (Persian: درتوم) (Note: Also romanized as Dartowm and Dartūm) is a village in Aladagh Rural District of the Central District in Bojnord County, North Khorasan province, Iran.

== Demographics ==
=== Population ===
At the time of the 2006 National Census, the village's population was 1,157 in 292 households. The following census in 2011 counted 1,131 people in 314 households. The 2016 census measured the population of the village as 1,074 people in 306 households.
