= Dar Sufian =

Dar Sufian درصوفيان
- Village
- Location within Iran
- Coordinates: 37°21′17″N 57°23′56″E
- Country: Iran
- Province: North Khorasan
- County: Bojnord
- Bakhsh: Central
- Rural District: Aladagh

Population (2006)
  - Total: 338
- Time zone: UTC+3:30 (IRST)
  - Summer (DST): UTC+4:30 (IRDT)

Dar Sufian (Persian: درصوفيان, also Romanized as Dar Şūfīān, Dār Şūfeyān, and Dar Sūfīyān) is a village in Aladagh Rural District, in the Central District of Bojnord County, North Khorasan Province, Iran. At the 2006 census, its population was 338, in 68 families. It is about 565 km (351 mi) away from Tehran, the country's capital.
