= Bolqan-e Olya =

Bolqan-e Olya بلقان عليا
- Village
- Location within Iran
- Coordinates: 37°09′46″N 57°55′24″E
- Country: Iran
- Province: North Khorasan
- County: Shirvan
- Bakhsh: Central
- Rural District: Golian

Population (2006)
  - Total: 409
- Time zone: UTC+3:30 (IRST)
  - Summer (DST): UTC+4:30 (IRDT)

Bolqan-e Olya (Persian: بلقان عليا, also Romanized as Bolqān-e ‘Olyā; also known as Bolqān-e Bālā, Bolghān, Bolqān, and Yalqān-e Bālā) is a village in Golian Rural District, in the Central District of Shirvan County, North Khorasan Province, Iran. At the 2006 census, its population was 409, in 92 families.
