= Birak-e Sofla =

Village in North Khorasan province, Iran

Birak-e Sofla Persian: بيرك سفلي
- Village
- Location within Iran
- Coordinates: 36°59′29″N 58°10′30″E
- Country: Iran
- Province: North Khorasan
- County: Faruj
- District: Central
- Rural District: Sangar

Population (2016)
  - Total: 383
- Time zone: UTC+3:30 (IRST)

Birak-e Sofla (Persian: بيرك سفلي) (Note: Also romanized as Bīrak-e Soflá; also known as Bīrak-e Pā’īn, Bīraq-e Pā’īn, and Bīraq-e Soflá) is a village in Sangar Rural District of the Central District in Faruj County, North Khorasan province, Iran.

== Demographics ==
=== Population ===
At the time of the 2006 National Census, the village's population was 467 in 106 households. The following census in 2011 counted 419 people in 120 households. The 2016 census measured the population of the village as 383 people in 137 households.
