= Rain, Iran =

Rain رئين
- Village
- Location within Iran
- Coordinates: 37°24′09″N 57°01′59″E
- Country: Iran
- Province: North Khorasan
- County: Bojnord
- Bakhsh: Central
- Rural District: Aladagh

Population (2016)
  - Total: 631
- Time zone: UTC+3:30 (IRST)
  - Summer (DST): UTC+4:30 (IRDT)

Rain (Persian: رئين, also Romanized as Ra’īn) is a village in Aladagh Rural District, in the Central District of Bojnord County, North Khorasan Province, Iran. At the 2006 census, its population was 917, in 235 families.
