= Kalateh-ye Yavari =

Kalateh-ye Yavari كلاته ياوري
- Village
- Location within Iran
- Coordinates: 37°27′15″N 57°21′06″E
- Country: Iran
- Province: North Khorasan
- County: Bojnord
- Bakhsh: Central
- Rural District: Aladagh

Population (2006)
  - Total: 552
- Time zone: UTC+3:30 (IRST)
  - Summer (DST): UTC+4:30 (IRDT)

Kalateh-ye Yavari (Persian: كلاته ياوري, also Romanized as Kalāteh-ye Yāvarī and Kalāteh-ye Yāvari) is a village in Aladagh Rural District, in the Central District of Bojnord County, North Khorasan Province, Iran. At the 2006 census, its population was 552, in 120 families.
