= Taraqi-ye Kord =

Taraqi-ye Kord طراقي كرد
- Village
- Location within Iran
- Coordinates: 37°21′34″N 57°21′49″E
- Country: Iran
- Province: North Khorasan
- County: Bojnord
- Bakhsh: Central
- Rural District: Aladagh

Population (2006)
  - Total: 634
- Time zone: UTC+3:30 (IRST)
  - Summer (DST): UTC+4:30 (IRDT)

Taraqi-ye Kord (Persian: طراقي كرد, also Romanized as Ţarāqī-ye Kord and Ţarāqī Kord; also known as Ţarāqī-ye ‘Alīkāllū and Taraqt Kord) is a village in Aladagh Rural District, in the Central District of Bojnord County, North Khorasan Province, Iran. At the 2006 census, its population was 634, in 153 families.
