= Kacharanlu =

Village in North Khorasan province, Iran

Kacharanlu Persian: كچرانلو
- Village
- Location within Iran
- Coordinates: 37°22′56″N 57°15′15″E
- Country: Iran
- Province: North Khorasan
- County: Bojnord
- District: Central
- Rural District: Aladagh

Population (2016)
  - Total: 1,048
- Time zone: UTC+3:30 (IRST)

Kacharanlu (Persian: كچرانلو) (Note: Also romanized as Kacharānlū; also known as Kachlānlū) is a village in Aladagh Rural District of the Central District in Bojnord County, North Khorasan province, Iran.

== Demographics ==
=== Population ===
At the time of the 2006 National Census, the village's population was 755 in 190 households. The following census in 2011 counted 864 people in 239 households. The 2016 census measured the population of the village as 1,048 people in 243 households.
