= Qasim Khan (disambiguation) =

Qasim Khan (died 1469) was the first Khan of the Qasim Khanate.

Qasim Khan may also refer to:

- Qasim Khan (cricketer) (born 1993), Afghan cricketer
- Qasim Abbas Khan, Pakistani politician

== See also ==
- Qasem Khan, village in North Khorasan Province, Iran
- Qasem Khan, Razavi Khorasan, village in Iran
- Kasym Khan, of the Kazakh Khanate
