= Sheykh, North Khorasan =

Sheykh شيخ
- Village
- Location within Iran
- Coordinates: 37°33′33″N 57°33′28″E
- Country: Iran
- Province: North Khorasan
- County: Bojnord
- Bakhsh: Garmkhan
- Rural District: Garmkhan

Population (2006)
  - Total: 521
- Time zone: UTC+3:30 (IRST)
  - Summer (DST): UTC+4:30 (IRDT)

Sheykh (Persian: شيخ) is a village in Garmkhan Rural District, Garmkhan District, Bojnord County, North Khorasan Province, Iran. At the 2006 census, its population was 521, in 119 families.
