= Zirkuh Gaduganlu =

Zirkuh Gaduganlu زيركوه گدوگانلو
- village
- Location within Iran
- Coordinates: 37°31′33″N 58°04′21″E
- Country: Iran
- Province: North Khorasan
- County: Shirvan
- Bakhsh: Central
- Rural District: Sivkanlu

Population (2006)
  - Total: 234
- Time zone: UTC+3:30 (IRST)
  - Summer (DST): UTC+4:30 (IRDT)

Zirkuh Gaduganlu (Persian: زيركوه گدوگانلو, also Romanized as Zīrḵūh Gadūgānlū; also known as Gadūgānlū and Gadūgownlū) is a village in Sivkanlu Rural District, in the Central District of Shirvan County, North Khorasan Province, Iran. At the 2006 census, its population was 234, in 66 families.
