= Kurkanlu-ye Olya =

Kurkanlu-ye Olya كوركانلوعليا
- Village
- Location within Iran
- Coordinates: 37°42′21″N 57°57′42″E
- Country: Iran
- Province: North Khorasan
- County: Shirvan
- Bakhsh: Sarhad
- Rural District: Jirestan

Population (2006)
  - Total: 138
- Time zone: UTC+3:30 (IRST)
  - Summer (DST): UTC+4:30 (IRDT)

Kurkanlu-ye Olya (Persian: كوركانلوعليا, also Romanized as Kūrkānlū-ye ‘Olyā; also known as Kūrkānlū-ye Bālā, Kūr Kānlū, and Kūkānlū) is a village in Jirestan Rural District, Sarhad District, Shirvan County, North Khorasan Province, Iran. At the 2006 census, its population was 138, in 33 families.
