= Rahimabad, Shirvan =

Rahimabad رحيم اباد
- Village
- Country: Iran
- Province: North Khorasan
- County: Shirvan
- Bakhsh: Central
- Rural District: Sivkanlu

Population (2006)
  - Total: 166
- Time zone: UTC+3:30 (IRST)
  - Summer (DST): UTC+4:30 (IRDT)

Rahimabad (Persian: رحيم اباد, also Romanized as Raḥīmābād) is a village in Sivkanlu Rural District, in the Central District of Shirvan County, North Khorasan Province, Iran. At the 2006 census, its population was 166, in 43 families.
