= Milanlu-ye Sofla =

Milanlu-ye Sofla ميلانلوسفلي
- Village
- Location within Iran
- Coordinates: 37°40′38″N 58°01′48″E
- Country: Iran
- Province: North Khorasan
- County: Shirvan
- Bakhsh: Sarhad
- Rural District: Jirestan

Population (2006)
  - Total: 94
- Time zone: UTC+3:30 (IRST)
  - Summer (DST): UTC+4:30 (IRDT)

Milanlu-ye Sofla (Persian: ميلانلوسفلي, also Romanized as Mīlānlū-ye Soflá; also known as Mīlānlū-ye Pā’īn and Mīlānlū Pā’īn) is a village in Jirestan Rural District, Sarhad District, Shirvan County, North Khorasan Province, Iran. At the 2006 census, its population was 94, in 21 families.
