= Kalateh-ye Firuzeh =

Kalateh-ye Firuzeh كلاته فيروزه
- Village
- Location within Iran
- Coordinates: 37°32′03″N 57°58′25″E
- Country: Iran
- Province: North Khorasan
- County: Shirvan
- Bakhsh: Central
- Rural District: Ziarat

Population (2006)
  - Total: 178
- Time zone: UTC+3:30 (IRST)
  - Summer (DST): UTC+4:30 (IRDT)

Kalateh-ye Firuzeh (Persian: كلاته فيروزه, also Romanized as Kalāteh-ye Fīrūzeh; also known as Fīrūzeh) is a village in Ziarat Rural District, in the Central District of Shirvan County, North Khorasan Province, Iran. At the 2006 census, its population was 178, in 45 families.
