= Janjalabad =

Janjalabad جنجال اباد
- Village
- Location within Iran
- Coordinates: 37°01′25″N 58°10′03″E
- Country: Iran
- Province: North Khorasan
- County: Faruj
- Bakhsh: Central
- Rural District: Sangar

Population (2006)
  - Total: 148
- Time zone: UTC+3:30 (IRST)
  - Summer (DST): UTC+4:30 (IRDT)

Janjalabad (Persian: جنجال اباد, also Romanized as Janjālābād and Janjelābād) is a village in Sangar Rural District, in the Central District of Faruj County, North Khorasan Province, Iran. At the 2006 census, its population was 148, in 33 families.
