= Shahrak-e Qaem =

Shahrak-e Qaem شهرك قائم
- Village
- Location within Iran
- Coordinates: 37°32′43″N 57°34′19″E
- Country: Iran
- Province: North Khorasan
- County: Bojnord
- Bakhsh: Garmkhan
- Rural District: Garmkhan

Population (2006)
  - Total: 327
- Time zone: UTC+3:30 (IRST)
  - Summer (DST): UTC+4:30 (IRDT)

Shahrak-e Qaem (Persian: شهرك قائم, also Romanized as Shahrak-e Qā’em; also known as Khaṭāb) is a village in Garmkhan Rural District, Garmkhan District, Bojnord County, North Khorasan Province, Iran. At the 2006 census, its population was 327, in 76 families.
