= Qolhak-e Sofla =

Qolhak-e Sofla قلهك سفلي
- Village
- Location within Iran
- Coordinates: 37°47′24″N 57°43′31″E
- Country: Iran
- Province: North Khorasan
- County: Shirvan
- Bakhsh: Qushkhaneh
- Rural District: Qushkhaneh-ye Bala

Population (2006)
  - Total: 129
- Time zone: UTC+3:30 (IRST)
  - Summer (DST): UTC+4:30 (IRDT)

Qolhak-e Sofla (Persian: قلهك سفلي, also Romanized as Qolhak-e Soflá; also known as Qolhak-e Pā’īn and Kulyay) is a village in Qushkhaneh-ye Bala Rural District, Qushkhaneh District, Shirvan County, North Khorasan Province, Iran. At the 2006 census, its population was 129, in 33 families.
