= Yengi Qaleh-ye Shahrak =

Yengi Qaleh-ye Shahrak ينگي قلعه شهرك
- Village
- Location within Iran
- Coordinates: 37°35′05″N 57°07′26″E
- Country: Iran
- Province: North Khorasan
- County: Bojnord
- Bakhsh: Central
- Rural District: Badranlu

Population (2006)
  - Total: 131
- Time zone: UTC+3:30 (IRST)
  - Summer (DST): UTC+4:30 (IRDT)

Yengi Qaleh-ye Shahrak (Persian: ينگي قلعه شهرك, also Romanized as Yengī Qal‘eh-ye Shahrak; also known as Yengī Qal‘eh) is a village in Badranlu Rural District, in the Central District of Bojnord County, North Khorasan Province, Iran. At the 2006 census, its population was 131, in 27 families.
