= Zu, North Khorasan =

Zu زو
- Village
- Location within Iran
- Coordinates: 37°44′11″N 57°46′17″E
- Country: Iran
- Province: North Khorasan
- County: Shirvan
- Bakhsh: Qushkhaneh
- Rural District: Qushkhaneh-ye Bala

Population (2006)
  - Total: 244
- Time zone: UTC+3:30 (IRST)
  - Summer (DST): UTC+4:30 (IRDT)

Zu (Persian: زو, also Romanized as Zū and Zow) is a village in Qushkhaneh-ye Bala Rural District, Qushkhaneh District, Shirvan County, North Khorasan Province, Iran. At the 2006 census, its population was 244, in 53 families.
