= Yengi Qaleh-ye Kasbair =

Yengi Qaleh-ye Kasbair ینگی قلعه کسبایر
- Village
- Country: Iran
- Province: North Khorasan
- County: Bojnord
- Bakhsh: Central
- Rural District: Badranlu

Population (2006)
  - Total: 24
- Time zone: UTC+3:30 (IRST)
  - Summer (DST): UTC+4:30 (IRDT)

Yengi Qaleh-ye Kasbair (Persian: ینگی قلعه کسبایر, also Romanized as Yengī Qal‘eh-ye Kasbāīr) is a village in Badranlu Rural District, in the Central District of Bojnord County, North Khorasan Province, Iran. At the 2006 census, its population was 24, in 5 families.
