= Pireh, Faruj =

Pireh پيره
- Village
- Location within Iran
- Coordinates: 37°02′42″N 58°13′28″E
- Country: Iran
- Province: North Khorasan
- County: Faruj
- Bakhsh: Central
- Rural District: Sangar

Population (2006)
  - Total: 105
- Time zone: UTC+3:30 (IRST)
  - Summer (DST): UTC+4:30 (IRDT)

Pireh (Persian: پيره, also Romanized as Pīreh; also known as Bīreh) is a village in Sangar Rural District, in the Central District of Faruj County, North Khorasan Province, Iran. At the 2006 census, its population was 105, in 27 families.
