= Yan Bolagh, North Khorasan =

Yan Bolagh يانبلاغ
- Village
- Location within Iran
- Coordinates: 37°36′00″N 57°56′00″E
- Country: Iran
- Province: North Khorasan
- County: Shirvan
- Bakhsh: Sarhad
- Rural District: Takmaran

Population (2006)
  - Total: 88
- Time zone: UTC+3:30 (IRST)
  - Summer (DST): UTC+4:30 (IRDT)

Yan Bolagh (Persian: يانبلاغ, also Romanized as Yān Bolāgh; also known as Takhteh Sūzak) is a village in Takmaran Rural District, Sarhad District, Shirvan County, North Khorasan Province, Iran. At the 2006 census, its population was 88, in 19 families.
