= Ostad Teymurtash =

Ostad Teymurtash استادتيمورتاش
- Village
- Location within Iran
- Coordinates: 37°29′35″N 57°08′36″E
- Country: Iran
- Province: North Khorasan
- County: Bojnord
- Bakhsh: Central
- Rural District: Badranlu

Population (2006)
  - Total: 273
- Time zone: UTC+3:30 (IRST)
  - Summer (DST): UTC+4:30 (IRDT)

Ostad Teymurtash (Persian: استادتيمورتاش, also Romanized as Ostād Teymūrtāsh; also known as Qal‘eh-ye Ostāhā) is a village in Badranlu Rural District, in the Central District of Bojnord County, North Khorasan Province, Iran. At the 2006 census, its population was 273, in 80 families.
