= Abri Tappeh =

Abri Tappeh ابري تپه
- Village
- Location within Iran
- Coordinates: 36°53′33″N 57°26′37″E
- Country: Iran
- Province: North Khorasan
- County: Esfarayen
- Bakhsh: Central
- Rural District: Azari

Population (2006)
  - Total: 259
- Time zone: UTC+3:30 (IRST)
  - Summer (DST): UTC+4:30 (IRDT)

Abri Tappeh (Persian: ابري تپه, also Romanized as Abrī Tappeh) is a village in Azari Rural District, in the Central District of Esfarayen County, North Khorasan Province, Iran. At the 2006 census, its population was 259, in 59 families.
