= Danj, Iran =

Danj دنج
- Village
- Location within Iran
- Coordinates: 37°05′03″N 57°38′49″E
- Country: Iran
- Province: North Khorasan
- County: Esfarayen
- Bakhsh: Central
- Rural District: Azari

Population (2006)
  - Total: 60
- Time zone: UTC+3:30 (IRST)
  - Summer (DST): UTC+4:30 (IRDT)

Danj (Persian: دنج; also known as Qūchkānlū) is a village in Azari Rural District, in the Central District of Esfarayen County, North Khorasan Province, Iran. At the 2006 census, its population was 60, in 14 families.
