= Yengi Qaleh-ye Pain =

Village in North Khorasan, Iran

Yengi Qaleh-ye Pain ينگي قلعه پائين
- Village
- Location within Iran
- Coordinates: 37°44′56″N 57°42′28″E
- Country: Iran
- Province: North Khorasan
- County: Shirvan
- Bakhsh: Qushkhaneh
- Rural District: Qushkhaneh-ye Bala

Population (2006)
  - Total: 162
- Time zone: UTC+3:30 (IRST)
  - Summer (DST): UTC+4:30 (IRDT)

Yengi Qaleh-ye Pain (Persian: ينگي قلعه پائين, also Romanized as Yengī Qal‘eh-ye Pā’īn and Yangī Qal‘eh-ye Pā’īn; also known as Yengī Qal‘eh-ye Soflá) is a village in Qushkhaneh-ye Bala Rural District, Qushkhaneh District, Shirvan County, North Khorasan Province, Iran. At the 2006 census, its population was 162, in 36 families.
