= Morghdari-e Sang-e Sefidi =

Morghdari-e Sang-e Sefidi مرغداری سنگ سفیدی
- Village
- Country: Iran
- Province: North Khorasan
- County: Esfarayen
- Bakhsh: Central
- Rural District: Ruin

Population (2006)
  - Total: 7
- Time zone: UTC+3:30 (IRST)
  - Summer (DST): UTC+4:30 (IRDT)

Morghdari-e Sang-e Sefidi (Persian: مرغداری سنگ سفیدی, also Romanized as Morgh-dārī-e Sang-e Sefīdī) is a village in Ruin Rural District, in the Central District of Esfarayen County, North Khorasan Province, Iran. At the 2006 census, its population was 7, in 4 families.
