= Hesari =

Hesari حصاری
- Village
- Location within Iran
- Coordinates: 37°04′22″N 57°26′00″E
- Country: Iran
- Province: North Khorasan
- County: Esfarayen
- Bakhsh: Central
- Rural District: Ruin

Population (2006)
  - Total: 103
- Time zone: UTC+3:30 (IRST)
  - Summer (DST): UTC+4:30 (IRDT)

Hesari (Persian: حصاری, also Romanized as Ḩeşārī) is a village in Ruin Rural District, in the Central District of Esfarayen County, North Khorasan province, Iran. At the 2006 census, its population was 103, in 27 families.
