= Kalateh-ye Sanjar =

Kalateh-ye Sanjar كلاته سنجر
- Village
- Location within Iran
- Coordinates: 36°50′53″N 57°27′55″E
- Country: Iran
- Province: North Khorasan
- County: Esfarayen
- Bakhsh: Central
- Rural District: Azari

Population (2006)
  - Total: 494
- Time zone: UTC+3:30 (IRST)
  - Summer (DST): UTC+4:30 (IRDT)

Kalateh-ye Sanjar (Persian: كلاته سنجر, also Romanized as Kalāteh-ye Sanjar, Kalāteh-i-Sanjar, and Kalāteh Sanjar) is a village in Azari Rural District, in the Central District of Esfarayen County, North Khorasan Province, Iran. At the 2006 census, its population was 494, in 121 families.
