= Sinan, Iran =

Sinan سينان
- Village
- Location within Iran
- Coordinates: 37°03′55″N 57°26′05″E
- Country: Iran
- Province: North Khorasan
- County: Esfarayen
- Bakhsh: Central
- Rural District: Azari

Population (2006)
  - Total: 515
- Time zone: UTC+3:30 (IRST)
  - Summer (DST): UTC+4:30 (IRDT)

Sinan (Persian: سينان, also Romanized as Sīnān) is a village in Azari Rural District, in the Central District of Esfarayen County, North Khorasan Province, Iran. At the 2006 census, its population was 515, in 131 families.
