= Shiruyeh =

Shiruyeh شيرويه
- Village
- Location within Iran
- Coordinates: 37°13′19″N 57°20′07″E
- Country: Iran
- Province: North Khorasan
- County: Esfarayen
- Bakhsh: Central
- Rural District: Ruin

Population (2006)
  - Total: 46
- Time zone: UTC+3:30 (IRST)
  - Summer (DST): UTC+4:30 (IRDT)

Shiruyeh (Persian: شيرويه, also Romanized as Shīrūyeh) is a village in Ruin Rural District, in the Central District of Esfarayen County, North Khorasan Province, Iran. At the 2006 census, its population was 46, in 11 families.
