= Kesreq =

Kesreq كسرق
- Village
- Location within Iran
- Coordinates: 37°06′02″N 57°19′18″E
- Country: Iran
- Province: North Khorasan
- County: Esfarayen
- Bakhsh: Central
- Rural District: Ruin

Population (2006)
  - Total: 535
- Time zone: UTC+3:30 (IRST)
  - Summer (DST): UTC+4:30 (IRDT)

Kesreq (Persian: كسرق) is a village in Ruin Rural District, in the Central District of Esfarayen County, North Khorasan Province, Iran. At the 2006 census, its population was 535, in 120 families.
