= Shur-e Sofla =

Shur-e Sofla شورسفلي
- Village
- Location within Iran
- Coordinates: 37°06′54″N 57°40′38″E
- Country: Iran
- Province: North Khorasan
- County: Esfarayen
- Bakhsh: Central
- Rural District: Milanlu

Population (2006)
  - Total: 20
- Time zone: UTC+3:30 (IRST)
  - Summer (DST): UTC+4:30 (IRDT)

Shur-e Sofla (Persian: شورسفلي, also Romanized as Shūr-e Soflá; also known as Shūr-e Pā’īn) is a village in Milanlu Rural District, in the Central District of Esfarayen County, North Khorasan Province, Iran. At the 2006 census, its population was 20, in 4 families.
