= Valiabad, Esfarayen =

Valiabad ولي اباد
- Village
- Location within Iran
- Coordinates: 36°58′52″N 57°32′37″E
- Country: Iran
- Province: North Khorasan
- County: Esfarayen
- Bakhsh: Central
- Rural District: Azari

Population (2006)
  - Total: 266
- Time zone: UTC+3:30 (IRST)
  - Summer (DST): UTC+4:30 (IRDT)

Valiabad (Persian: ولي اباد, also Romanized as Valīābād) is a village in Azari Rural District, in the Central District of Esfarayen County, North Khorasan Province, Iran. At the 2006 census, its population was 266, in 63 families.
