= Palang Darreh, North Khorasan =

Palang Darreh پلنگدره
- Village
- Location within Iran
- Coordinates: 37°05′23″N 57°23′17″E
- Country: Iran
- Province: North Khorasan
- County: Esfarayen
- Bakhsh: Central
- Rural District: Ruin

Population (2006)
  - Total: 69
- Time zone: UTC+3:30 (IRST)
  - Summer (DST): UTC+4:30 (IRDT)

Palang Darreh (Persian: پلنگدره) is a village in Ruin Rural District, in the Central District of Esfarayen County, North Khorasan Province, Iran. At the 2006 census, its population was 69, in 19 families.
