= Sarkanlu =

Sarkanlu ساركانلو
- Village
- Location within Iran
- Coordinates: 37°05′12″N 57°34′46″E
- Country: Iran
- Province: North Khorasan
- County: Esfarayen
- Bakhsh: Central
- Rural District: Milanlu

Population (2006)
  - Total: 113
- Time zone: UTC+3:30 (IRST)
  - Summer (DST): UTC+4:30 (IRDT)

Sarkanlu (Persian: ساركانلو, also Romanized as Sarkānlū and Sārkānlū) is a village in Milanlu Rural District, in the Central District of Esfarayen County, North Khorasan Province, Iran. At the 2006 census, its population was 113, in 22 families.
