= Gom Eshaq =

Gom Eshaq گم اسحاق
- Village
- Location within Iran
- Coordinates: 36°55′11″N 57°16′42″E
- Country: Iran
- Province: North Khorasan
- County: Esfarayen
- Bakhsh: Central
- Rural District: Azari

Population (2006)
  - Total: 18
- Time zone: UTC+3:30 (IRST)
  - Summer (DST): UTC+4:30 (IRDT)

Gom Eshaq (Persian: گم اسحاق, also Romanized as Gom Esḩāq; also known as Gomeh Esḩāq) is a village in Azari Rural District, in the Central District of Esfarayen County, North Khorasan Province, Iran. At the 2006 census, its population was 18, in 5 families.
