= Bazanaj =

Bazanaj بزنج
- Village
- Location within Iran
- Coordinates: 37°05′42″N 57°26′44″E
- Country: Iran
- Province: North Khorasan
- County: Esfarayen
- Bakhsh: Central
- Rural District: Ruin

Population (2006)
  - Total: 578
- Time zone: UTC+3:30 (IRST)
  - Summer (DST): UTC+4:30 (IRDT)

Bazanaj (Persian: بزنج) is a village in Ruin Rural District, in the Central District of Esfarayen County, North Khorasan Province, Iran. Its population was 578, in 143 families at the 2006 census.
