= Baba Cheshmeh =

Baba Cheshmeh باباچشمه
- Village
- Location within Iran
- Coordinates: 36°45′55″N 57°37′03″E
- Country: Iran
- Province: North Khorasan
- County: Esfarayen
- Bakhsh: Central
- Rural District: Azari

Population (2006)
  - Total: 180
- Time zone: UTC+3:30 (IRST)
  - Summer (DST): UTC+4:30 (IRDT)

Baba Cheshmeh (Persian: باباچشمه, also Romanized as Bābā Cheshmeh) is a village in Azari Rural District, in the Central District of Esfarayen County, North Khorasan Province, Iran. At the 2006 census, its population was 180, in 38 families.
