= Qasem Khan =

Qasem Khan قاسم خان
- Village
- Location within Iran
- Coordinates: 36°52′31″N 57°21′44″E
- Country: Iran
- Province: North Khorasan
- County: Esfarayen
- Bakhsh: Central
- Rural District: Azari

Population (2006)
  - Total: 308
- Time zone: UTC+3:30 (IRST)
  - Summer (DST): UTC+4:30 (IRDT)

Qasem Khan (Persian: قاسم خان, also Romanized as Qāsem Khān) is a village in Azari Rural District, in the Central District of Esfarayen County, North Khorasan Province, Iran. At the 2006 census, its population was 308, in 81 families.
