= Maragheh, North Khorasan =

Maragheh مراغه
- Village
- Location within Iran
- Coordinates: 37°06′25″N 57°22′02″E
- Country: Iran
- Province: North Khorasan
- County: Esfarayen
- Bakhsh: Central
- Rural District: Ruin

Population (2006)
  - Total: 182
- Time zone: UTC+3:30 (IRST)
  - Summer (DST): UTC+4:30 (IRDT)

Maragheh (Persian: مراغه, also Romanized as Marāgheh) is a village in Ruin Rural District, in the Central District of Esfarayen County, North Khorasan Province, Iran. At the 2006 census, its population was 182, in 49 families.
