= Garmkhan District =

District in North Khorasan province, Iran

Garmkhan District Persian: بخش گرمخان
- District
- Location within Iran
- Coordinates: 37°37′N 57°26′E
- Country: Iran
- Province: North Khorasan
- County: Bojnord
- Established: 1995
- Capital: Hesar-e Garmkhan

Population (2016)
  - Total: 24,001
- Time zone: UTC+3:30 (IRST)

Garmkhan District (Persian: بخش گرمخان) is in Bojnord County, North Khorasan province, Iran. Its capital is the city of Hesar-e Garmkhan.

== Demographics ==
=== Population ===
At the time of the 2006 National Census, the district's population was 28,259 in 6,676 households. The following census in 2011 counted 26,955 people in 7,430 households. The 2016 census measured the population of the district as 24,001 inhabitants in 7,030 households.

=== Administrative divisions ===
Garmkhan District Population
Administrative Divisions	2006	2011	2016
Garmkhan RD	17,104	15,720	13,844
Gifan RD	10,439	9,577	8,658
Hesar-e Garmkhan (city)	716	1,658	1,499
Total	28,259	26,955	24,001
RD = Rural District
