= Central District (Faruj County) =

District in North Khorasan province, Iran

Central District (Faruj County) Persian: بخش مرکزی شهرستان فاروج
- District
- Location within Iran
- Coordinates: 37°07′N 58°07′E
- Country: Iran
- Province: North Khorasan
- County: Faruj
- Established: 2004
- Capital: Faruj

Population (2016)
  - Total: 34,574
- Time zone: UTC+3:30 (IRST)

The Central District of Faruj County (Persian: بخش مرکزی شهرستان فاروج) is in North Khorasan province, Iran. Its capital is the city of Faruj.

== Demographics ==
=== Population ===
At the 2006 National Census, the district's population was 33,409 in 8,781 households. The population was 37,102 people in 10,616 households at the following census of 2011, and 34,574 inhabitants in 10,778 households at the 2016 census.

=== Administrative divisions ===
Central District (Faruj County) Population
Administrative Divisions	2006	2011	2016
Faruj RD	7,488	7,246	6,963
Sangar RD	7,394	8,381	5,641
Shah Jahan RD	8,488	9,744	9,909
Faruj (city)	10,039	11,731	12,061
Total	33,409	37,102	34,574
RD = Rural District
