= Faruj County =

County in North Khorasan province, Iran

Faruj County Persian: شهرستان فاروج
- County
- Location of Faruj County in North Khorasan province (right, pink)

- Location of North Khorasan province in Iran
- Coordinates: 37°16′N 58°15′E
- Country: Iran
- Province: North Khorasan
- Established: 2004
- Capital: Faruj
- Districts: Central, Khabushan

Population (2016)
  - Total: 49,271
- Time zone: UTC+3:30 (IRST)

Faruj County (Persian: شهرستان فاروج) is in North Khorasan province, Iran. Its capital is the city of Faruj.

== History ==
The village of Titkanlu was converted to a city in 2009.

== Demographics ==
=== Population ===
At the time of the 2006 National Census, the county's population was 48,743 in 12,947 households. The population was counted as 52,364 people in 15,241 households at the 2011 census, and as 49,271 in 15,469 households at the 2016 census.

=== Administrative divisions ===
Faruj County's population history and administrative structure over three consecutive censuses are shown in the following table.

Faruj County Population
Administrative Divisions	2006	2011	2016
Central District	33,409	37,102	34,574
Faruj RD	7,488	7,246	6,963
Sangar RD	7,394	8,381	5,641
Shah Jahan RD	8,488	9,744	9,909
Faruj (city)	10,039	11,731	12,061
Khabushan District	15,334	15,231	14,669
Hesar RD	5,476	5,228	4,957
Titkanlu RD (Note: Formerly Khabushan Rural District)	9,858	6,176	5,877
Titkanlu (city)		3,827	3,835
Total	48,743	52,364	49,271
RD = Rural District

== See also ==
Media related to Faruj County at Wikimedia Commons
