= Central District (Shirvan County) =

District in North Khorasan province, Iran

Central District (Shirvan County) Persian: بخش مرکزی شهرستان شیروان
- District
- Location within Iran
- Coordinates: 37°23′N 57°57′E
- Country: Iran
- Province: North Khorasan
- County: Shirvan
- Capital: Shirvan

Population (2016)
  - Total: 123,745
- Time zone: UTC+3:30 (IRST)

The Central District of Shirvan County (Persian: بخش مرکزی شهرستان شیروان) is in North Khorasan province, Iran. Its capital is the city of Shirvan.

== History ==
The village of Ziarat was converted to a city in 2013, and the village of Khan Laq became a city in 2021.

== Demographics ==
=== Population ===
At the time of the 2006 census, the district's population was 126,928 in 31,926 households. The following census in 2011 counted 134,455 people in 37,178 households. The 2016 census measured the population of the district as 123,745 inhabitants in 37,420 households.

=== Administrative divisions ===
Central District (Shirvan County) Population
Administrative Divisions	2006	2011	2016
Golian RD	7,889	6,446	5,657
Howmeh RD	7,297	8,062	7,070
Sivkanlu RD	7,501	6,388	6,350
Zavarom RD	7,174	7,586	6,484
Ziarat RD	14,277	17,719	11,316
Khan Laq (city) (Note: Became a city after the 2016 census)			
Shirvan (city)	82,790	88,254	82,689
Ziarat (city)			4,179
Total	126,928	134,455	123,745
RD = Rural District
