= Central District (Bojnord County) =

District in North Khorasan province, Iran

Central District (Bojnord County) Persian: بخش مرکزی شهرستان بجنورد
- District
- Location within Iran
- Coordinates: 37°27′N 57°17′E
- Country: Iran
- Province: North Khorasan
- County: Bojnord
- Capital: Bojnord

Population (2016)
  - Total: 300,082
- Time zone: UTC+3:30 (IRST)

The Central District of Bojnord County (Persian: بخش مرکزی شهرستان بجنورد) is in North Khorasan province, Iran. Its capital is the city of Bojnord.

== History ==
The village of Chenaran was converted to the city of Chenaranshahr in 2013.

== Demographics ==
=== Population ===
At the time of the 2006 census, the district's population was 238,632 in 60,238 households. The following census in 2011 counted 279,872 people in 78,579 households. The 2016 census measured the population of the district as 300,082 inhabitants in 87,427 households.

=== Administrative divisions ===
Central District (Bojnord County) Population
Administrative Divisions	2006	2011	2016
Aladagh RD	26,259	32,494	28,218
Baba Aman RD	19,323	24,187	15,609
Badranlu RD	20,278	23,400	23,944
Bojnord (city)	172,772	199,791	228,931
Chenaranshahr (city)			3,380
Total	238,632	279,872	300,082
RD = Rural District
