= Shirvan County =

County in North Khorasan province, Iran

Shirvan County Persian: شهرستان شیروان
- County
- Location of Shirvan County in North Khorasan province (right, yellow)

- Location of North Khorasan province in Iran
- Coordinates: 37°32′N 57°53′E
- Country: Iran
- Province: North Khorasan
- Capital: Shirvan
- Districts: Central, Qushkhaneh, Sarhad

Population (2016)
  - Total: 146,140
- Time zone: UTC+3:30 (IRST)

Shirvan County (Persian: شهرستان شیروان) is in North Khorasan province, Iran. Its capital is the city of Shirvan.

== Demographics ==
=== Language and ethnicity ===
Kurmanji Kurds, Persians, Khorasani Turks, and Tats are the largest ethnic groups in the county. A small Jewish population was noted to be present also, numbering only five.

== History ==
The village of Yengi Qaleh-ye Bala became the city of Qushkhaneh in 2012, and the village of Ziarat was converted to a city in 2013. The village of Khan Laq was converted to a city in 2021.

=== Population ===
At the time of the 2006 census, the county's population was 152,493 in 37,647 households. The following census in 2011 counted 157,014 people in 43,009 households. The 2016 census measured the population of the county as 146,140 in 43,873 households.

=== Administrative divisions ===
Shirvan County's population history and administrative structure over three consecutive censuses are shown in the following table.

Shirvan County Population
Administrative Divisions	2006	2011	2016
Central District	126,928	134,455	123,745
Golian RD	7,889	6,446	5,657
Howmeh RD	7,297	8,062	7,070
Sivkanlu RD	7,501	6,388	6,350
Zavarom RD	7,174	7,586	6,484
Ziarat RD	14,277	17,719	11,316
Khan Laq (city) (Note: Became a city after the 2016 census)			
Shirvan (city)	82,790	88,254	82,689
Ziarat (city)			4,179
Qushkhaneh District	13,819	11,125	10,423
Qushkhaneh-ye Bala RD	8,048	6,229	5,270
Qushkhaneh-ye Pain RD	5,771	4,896	4,157
Qushkhaneh (city) (Note: Formerly the village of Yengi Qaleh-ye Bala)			996
Sarhad District	11,746	11,434	11,967
Jirestan RD	5,841	5,166	5,604
Takmaran RD	5,204	5,102	4,882
Lujali (city)	701	1,166	1,481
Total	152,493	157,014	146,140
RD = Rural District

== Geography ==
=== Location ===
Shirvan County, with an area of 3789 square kilometers, is bounded by Turkmenistan to the north, Esfarayen city to the south, Farooj county to the east and Bojnourd to the west. In the north of Shirvan, there is a city called Lujli. Shirvan is one of the high cities of North Khorasan province, which is located in the valley of the Atrak border river in the middle of Kopedagh and Aladagh mountains. Shirvan has a relatively cold climate in winter and a warm and temperate climate in summer.

=== Estarkhi waterfall ===
Estarkhi waterfall is one of the tallest waterfalls in Shirvan region. The length of this waterfall reaches 20 meters. This waterfall is located 40 km south of Shirvan city, on the northern slopes of Shah Jahan mountain range. On the way to reach this waterfall, Golian Cave is also one of the natural attractions of this region.

== Notable people ==
- Abdolreza Rahmani Fazli, born 1959 in Shirvan; Interior Minister of President Hassan Rouhani

== See also ==
Media related to Shirvan County at Wikimedia Commons
