= Bojnord County =

County in North Khorasan province, Iran

Bojnord County Persian: شهرستان بجنورد
- County
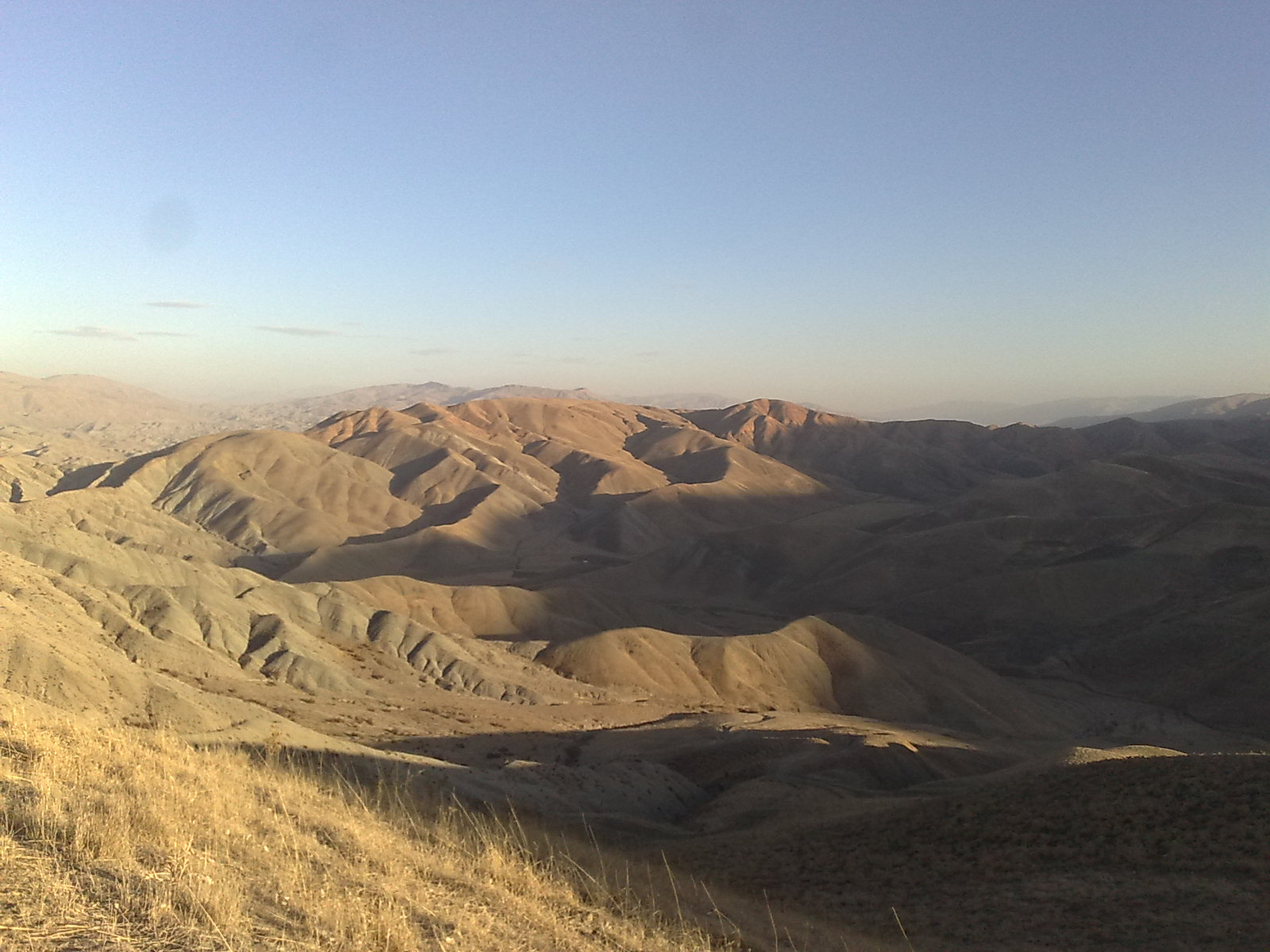
- Landscape near the village of Okhli

- Location of Bojnord County in North Khorasan province (center, purple)

- Location of North Khorasan province in Iran
- Coordinates: 37°37′N 57°22′E
- Country: Iran
- Province: North Khorasan
- Capital: Bojnord
- Districts: Central, Garmkhan

Population (2016)
  - Total: 324,083
- Time zone: UTC+3:30 (IRST)

Bojnord County (Persian: شهرستان بجنورد) is in North Khorasan province, Iran. Its capital is the city of Bojnord.

== History ==
In 2012, Raz and Jargalan District was separated from the county in the establishment of Raz and Jargalan County. The village of Chenaran was converted to the city of Chenaranshahr in 2013.

== Demographics ==
=== Population ===
At the time of the 2006 census, the county's population was 322,309 in 79,882 households. The following census in 2011 counted 365,896 people in 100,900 households. The 2016 census measured the population of the county as 324,083 in 94,457 households.

=== Administrative divisions ===
Bojnord County's population history and administrative structure over three consecutive censuses are shown in the following table.

Bojnord County Population
Administrative Divisions	2006	2011	2016
Central District	238,632	279,872	300,082
Aladagh RD	26,259	32,494	28,218
Baba Aman RD	19,323	24,187	15,609
Badranlu RD	20,278	23,400	23,944
Bojnord (city)	172,772	199,791	228,931
Chenaranshahr (city)			3,380
Garmkhan District	28,259	26,955	24,001
Garmkhan RD	17,104	15,720	13,844
Gifan RD	10,439	9,577	8,658
Hesar-e Garmkhan (city)	716	1,658	1,499
Raz and Jargalan District (Note: Transferred to Raz and Jargalan County)	55,418	59,034	
Gholaman RD	13,965	14,813	
Jargalan RD	30,659	32,981	
Raz RD	6,059	5,493	
Raz (city)	4,735	5,747	
Total	322,309	365,896	324,083
RD = Rural District

== See also ==
Media related to Bojnord County at Wikimedia Commons
