= Eslamabad, Garmeh =

Village in North Khorasan province, Iran

Eslamabad Persian: اسلام‌آباد
- Village
- Country: Iran
- Province: North Khorasan
- County: Garmeh
- District: Central
- Rural District: Bala Dasht

Population (2016)
  - Total: 463
- Time zone: UTC+3:30 (IRST)

Eslamabad (Persian: اسلام‌آباد) is a village in Bala Dasht Rural District of the Central District in Garmeh County, North Khorasan province, Iran.

== History ==
In 2008, Golestan Rural District, parts of Miyan Dasht Rural District, and the city of Daraq were separated from the Central District of Jajrom County in the establishment of Garmeh County. Bala Dasht Rural District was created in the new Central District.

== Demographics ==
=== Population ===
At the time of the 2011 National Census, the village's population was 45 people in 12 households. The 2016 census measured the population of the village as 463 people in 141 households, the most populous in its rural district.
