= Chahar Chubeh =

Village in North Khorasan province, Iran

Chahar Chubeh Persian: چهارچوبه
- Village
- Location within Iran
- Coordinates: 37°13′37″N 56°35′59″E
- Country: Iran
- Province: North Khorasan
- County: Garmeh
- District: Central
- Rural District: Bala Dasht

Population (2016)
  - Total: 351
- Time zone: UTC+3:30 (IRST)

Chahar Chubeh (Persian: چهارچوبه) (Note: Also romanized as Chahār Chūbeh; also known as Chahār Jubeh) is a village in Bala Dasht Rural District of the Central District in Garmeh County, North Khorasan province, Iran.

== Demographics ==
=== Population ===
At the time of the 2006 National Census, the village's population was 313 in 76 households, when it was in Golestan Rural District of the Central District in Jajrom County. The following census in 2011 counted 351 people in 96 households, by which time the rural district had been separated from the county in the establishment of Garmeh County. It was transferred to the new Central District, and Chahar Chubeh was transferred to Bala Dasht Rural District created in the same district. The 2016 census measured the population of the village as 351 people in 93 households.
