= Barzaneh =

Village in North Khorasan province, Iran

Barzaneh Persian: برزنه
- Village
- Location within Iran
- Coordinates: 37°14′12″N 56°34′17″E
- Country: Iran
- Province: North Khorasan
- County: Garmeh
- District: Central
- Rural District: Bala Dasht

Population (2016)
  - Total: 162
- Time zone: UTC+3:30 (IRST)

Barzaneh (Persian: برزنه) (Note: Also romanized as Borzaneh) is a village in Bala Dasht Rural District of the Central District in Garmeh County, North Khorasan province, Iran.

== Demographics ==
=== Population ===
At the time of the 2006 National Census, the village's population was 242 in 51 households, when it was in Golestan Rural District of the Central District in Jajrom County. The following census in 2011 counted 207 people in 59 households, by which time the rural district had been separated from the county in the establishment of Garmeh County. It was transferred to the new Central District, and Barzaneh was transferred to Bala Dasht Rural District created in the same district. The 2016 census measured the population of the village as 162 people in 54 households.
