= Shurak-e Bala =

Village in North Khorasan province, Iran

Shurak-e Bala Persian: شورك بالا
- Village
- Location within Iran
- Coordinates: 37°14′26″N 56°31′13″E
- Country: Iran
- Province: North Khorasan
- County: Garmeh
- District: Central
- Rural District: Bala Dasht

Population (2016)
  - Total: 164
- Time zone: UTC+3:30 (IRST)

Shurak-e Bala (Persian: شورك بالا) (Note: Also romanized as Shūrak-e Bālā; also known as Shūrak, Shūrek, and Shūrīk) is a village in Bala Dasht Rural District of the Central District in Garmeh County, North Khorasan province, Iran.

== Demographics ==
=== Population ===
At the time of the 2006 National Census, the village's population was 179 in 47 households, when it was in Golestan Rural District of the Central District in Jajrom County. The following census in 2011 counted 150 people in 49 households, by which time the rural district had been separated from the county in the establishment of Garmeh County. It was transferred to the new Central District, and Shurak-e Bala was transferred to Bala Dasht Rural District created in the same district. The 2016 census measured the population of the village as 164 people in 49 households.
