= Korki, North Khorasan =

Village in North Khorasan province, Iran

Korki Persian: كركي
- Village
- Location within Iran
- Coordinates: 37°13′10″N 56°34′01″E
- Country: Iran
- Province: North Khorasan
- County: Garmeh
- District: Central
- Rural District: Bala Dasht

Population (2016)
  - Total: 187
- Time zone: UTC+3:30 (IRST)

Korki (Persian: كركي) (Note: Also romanized as Korkī; also known as Kūrakī and Kūrkī) is a village in Bala Dasht Rural District of the Central District in Garmeh County, North Khorasan province, Iran.

== Demographics ==
=== Population ===
At the time of the 2006 National Census, the village's population was 177 in 41 households, when it was in Golestan Rural District of the Central District in Jajrom County. The following census in 2011 counted 168 people in 39 households, by which time the rural district had been separated from the county in the establishment of Garmeh County. It was transferred to the new Central District, and Korki was transferred to Bala Dasht Rural District created in the same district. The 2016 census measured the population of the village as 187 people in 45 households.
