= Moshammi =

Village in North Khorasan province, Iran

Moshammi Persian: مشمي
- Village
- Location within Iran
- Coordinates: 37°14′08″N 56°37′02″E
- Country: Iran
- Province: North Khorasan
- County: Garmeh
- District: Central
- Rural District: Bala Dasht

Population (2016)
  - Total: 75
- Time zone: UTC+3:30 (IRST)

Moshammi (Persian: مشمي) (Note: Also romanized as Moshammī; also known as Moshammā (مشما)) is a village in Bala Dasht Rural District of the Central District in Garmeh County, North Khorasan province, Iran.

== Demographics ==
=== Population ===
At the time of the 2006 National Census, the village's population was 105 in 29 households, when it was in Golestan Rural District of the Central District in Jajrom County. The following census in 2011 counted 77 people in 23 households, by which time the rural district had been separated from the county in the establishment of Garmeh County. It was transferred to the new Central District, and Moshammi was transferred to Bala Dasht Rural District created in the same district. The 2016 census measured the population of the village as 75 people in 23 households.
