= Kaj Bid =

Village in North Khorasan province, Iran

Kaj Bid Persian: كج بيد
- Village
- Location within Iran
- Country: Iran
- Province: North Khorasan
- County: Garmeh
- District: Central
- Rural District: Bala Dasht

Population (2016)
  - Total: 0
- Time zone: UTC+3:30 (IRST)

Balqoli-ye Kohneh (Persian: بلقلي كهنه) (Note: Also romanized as Balqolī-ye Kohneh; also known as Bolāgholī-ye Kohneh and Bolāghlī Kohneh) is a village in Bala Dasht Rural District of the Central District in Garmeh County, North Khorasan province, Iran.

== Demographics ==
=== Population ===
At the time of the 2006 National Census, the village's population was nine in four households, when it was in Golestan Rural District of the Central District in Jajrom County. The village did not appear in the following census of 2011, by which time the rural district had been separated from the county in the establishment of Garmeh County. It was transferred to the new Central District, and Kaj Bid was transferred to Bala Dasht Rural District created in the same district. The 2016 census measured the population of the village as zero.
