= Asgharabad, North Khorasan =

Village in North Khorasan province, Iran

Asgharabad Persian: اصغراباد
- Village
- Location within Iran
- Coordinates: 37°18′49″N 56°32′02″E
- Country: Iran
- Province: North Khorasan
- County: Garmeh
- District: Central
- Rural District: Bala Dasht

Population (2016)
  - Total: 102
- Time zone: UTC+3:30 (IRST)

Asgharabad (Persian: اصغراباد) (Note: Also romanized as Aşgharābād) is a village in, and the capital of, Bala Dasht Rural District in the Central District of Garmeh County, North Khorasan province, Iran.

== Demographics ==
=== Population ===
At the time of the 2006 National Census, the village's population was 114 in 33 households, when it was in Golestan Rural District of the Central District in Jajrom County. The following census in 2011 counted 97 people in 27 households, by which time the rural district had been separated from the county in the establishment of Garmeh County. It was transferred to the new Central District, and Asgharabad was transferred to Bala Dasht Rural District created in the same district. The 2016 census measured the population of the village as 102 people in 32 households.
