= Robat-e Eshq =

Village in North Khorasan province, Iran

Robat-e Eshq Persian: رباطعشق
- Village
- Location within Iran
- Coordinates: 37°19′27″N 56°33′30″E
- Country: Iran
- Province: North Khorasan
- County: Garmeh
- District: Central
- Rural District: Bala Dasht

Population (2016)
  - Total: 84
- Time zone: UTC+3:30 (IRST)

Robat-e Eshq (Persian: رباطعشق) (Note: Also romanized as Robāţ-e ‘Eshq) is a village in Bala Dasht Rural District of the Central District in Garmeh County, North Khorasan province, Iran.

== Demographics ==
=== Population ===
At the time of the 2006 National Census, the village's population was 85 in 27 households, when it was in Golestan Rural District of the Central District in Jajrom County. The following census in 2011 counted 88 people in 26 households, by which time the rural district had been separated from the county in the establishment of Garmeh County. It was transferred to the new Central District, and Robat-e Eshq was transferred to Bala Dasht Rural District created in the same district. The 2016 census measured the population of the village as 84 people in 29 households.
