= Cheshmeh Khan =

Village in North Khorasan province, Iran

Cheshmeh Khan Persian: چشمه خان
- Village
- Location within Iran
- Coordinates: 37°17′35″N 56°07′00″E
- Country: Iran
- Province: North Khorasan
- County: Garmeh
- District: Central
- Rural District: Golestan

Population (2016)
  - Total: 578
- Time zone: UTC+3:30 (IRST)

Cheshmeh Khan (Persian: چشمه خان) (Note: Also romanized as Cheshmeh Khān; also known as Qal‘eh-ye Cheshmeh Khān) is a village in Golestan Rural District of the Central District in Garmeh County, North Khorasan province, Iran.

== Demographics ==
=== Population ===
At the time of the 2006 National Census, the village's population was 474 in 128 households, when it was in the Central District of Jajrom County. The following census in 2011 counted 565 people in 179 households, by which time the rural district had been separated from the county in the establishment of Garmeh County. It was transferred to the new Central District. The 2016 census measured the population of the village as 578 people in 186 households.
