= Golmandarreh =

Village in North Khorasan province, Iran

Golmandarreh Persian: گل من دره
- Village
- Location within Iran
- Coordinates: 37°10′33″N 56°03′13″E
- Country: Iran
- Province: North Khorasan
- County: Garmeh
- District: Central
- Rural District: Golestan

Population (2016)
  - Total: 68
- Time zone: UTC+3:30 (IRST)

Golmandarreh (Persian: گل من دره) is a village in Golestan Rural District of the Central District in Garmeh County, North Khorasan province, Iran.

== Demographics ==
=== Population ===
At the time of the 2006 National Census, the village's population was 48 in 15 households, when it was in the Central District of Jajrom County. The following census in 2011 counted 70 people in 25 households, by which time the rural district had been separated from the county in the establishment of Garmeh County. It was transferred to the new Central District. The 2016 census measured the population of the village as 68 people in 22 households.
