= Marghzar, Garmeh =

Village in North Khorasan province, Iran

Marghzar Persian: مرغزار
- Village
- Location within Iran
- Coordinates: 37°09′23″N 56°17′03″E
- Country: Iran
- Province: North Khorasan
- County: Garmeh
- District: Central
- Rural District: Bala Dasht

Population (2016)
  - Total: 27
- Time zone: UTC+3:30 (IRST)

Marghzar (Persian: مرغزار) (Note: Also romanized as Marghzār, Morghzar, and Morghzār) is a village in Bala Dasht Rural District of the Central District in Garmeh County, North Khorasan province, Iran.

== Demographics ==
=== Population ===
At the time of the 2006 National Census, the village's population was 23 in 10 households, when it was in Golestan Rural District of the Central District in Jajrom County. The following census in 2011 counted 50 people in 15 households, by which time the rural district had been separated from the county in the establishment of Garmeh County. It was transferred to the new Central District, and Marghzar was transferred to Bala Dasht Rural District created in the same district. The 2016 census measured the population of the village as 27 people in nine households.
