= Bala Dasht Rural District =

Rural district in North Khorasan province, Iran

Bala Dasht Rural District Persian: دهستان بالادشت
- Rural District
- Location within Iran
- Coordinates: 37°07′N 56°20′E
- Country: Iran
- Province: North Khorasan
- County: Garmeh
- District: Central
- Established: 2008
- Capital: Asgharabad

Population (2016)
  - Total: 2,112
- Time zone: UTC+3:30 (IRST)

Bala Dasht Rural District (Persian: دهستان بالادشت) is in the Central District of Garmeh County, North Khorasan province, Iran. Its capital is the village of Asgharabad.

== History ==
In 2008, Golestan Rural District, parts of Miyan Dasht Rural District, and the city of Daraq were separated from Jajrom County in the establishment of Garmeh County. Bala Dasht Rural District was created in the new Central District.

== Demographics ==
=== Population ===
At the time of the 2011 National Census, the rural district's population was 1,576 inhabitants in 439 households. The 2016 census measured the population of the rural district as 2,112 in 606 households. The most populous of its 40 villages was Eslamabad, with 463 people.

=== Other villages in the rural district ===
- Barzaneh
- Chahar Chubeh
- Kaj Bid
- Korki
- Marghzar
- Moshammi
- Qezel Hesar-e Bala
- Qezel Hesar-e Pain
- Robat-e Eshq
- Shurak-e Bala
