= Dasht, North Khorasan =

Village in North Khorasan province, Iran

Dasht Persian: دشت
- Village
- Location within Iran
- Coordinates: 37°18′21″N 56°00′34″E
- Country: Iran
- Province: North Khorasan
- County: Garmeh
- District: Central
- Rural District: Golestan

Population (2016)
  - Total: 1,393
- Time zone: UTC+3:30 (IRST)

Dasht (Persian: دشت) is a village in Golestan Rural District of the Central District in Garmeh County, North Khorasan province, Iran.

== Demographics ==
=== Population ===
At the time of the 2006 National Census, the village's population was 1,132 in 305 households, when it was in the Central District of Jajrom County. The following census in 2011 counted 1,278 people in 391 households, by which time the rural district had been separated from the county in the establishment of Garmeh County. It was transferred to the new Central District. The 2016 census measured the population of the village as 1,393 people in 433 households, the most populous in its rural district.
