= Qezel Hesar-e Bala =

Village in North Khorasan province, Iran

Qezel Hesar-e Bala Persian: قزل حصاربالا
- Village
- Location within Iran
- Coordinates: 37°14′50″N 56°35′15″E
- Country: Iran
- Province: North Khorasan
- County: Garmeh
- District: Central
- Rural District: Bala Dasht

Population (2016)
  - Total: 131
- Time zone: UTC+3:30 (IRST)

Qezel Hesar-e Bala (Persian: قزل حصاربالا) (Note: Also romanized as Qezel Ḩeşār-e Bālā; also known as Qezel Ḩeşār-e ‘Olyā) is a village in Bala Dasht Rural District of the Central District in Garmeh County, North Khorasan province, Iran.

== Demographics ==
=== Population ===
At the time of the 2006 National Census, the village's population was 126 in 32 households, when it was in Golestan Rural District of the Central District in Jajrom County. The following census in 2011 counted 123 people in 33 households, by which time the rural district had been separated from the county in the establishment of Garmeh County. It was transferred to the new Central District, and Qezel Hesar-e Bala was transferred to Bala Dasht Rural District created in the same district. The 2016 census measured the population of the village as 131 people in 37 households.
