= Qezel Hesar-e Pain =

Village in North Khorasan province, Iran

Qezel Hesar-e Pain Persian: قزل حصارپائين
- Village
- Location within Iran
- Coordinates: 37°15′46″N 56°34′43″E
- Country: Iran
- Province: North Khorasan
- County: Garmeh
- District: Central
- Rural District: Bala Dasht

Population (2016)
  - Total: 187
- Time zone: UTC+3:30 (IRST)

Qezel Hesar-e Pain (Persian: قزل حصارپائين) (Note: Also romanized as Qezel Ḩeşār-e Pā’īn; also known as Qezel Ḩeşār-e Soflá and Quezel Ḩeşār Pā’īn) is a village in Bala Dasht Rural District of the Central District in Garmeh County, North Khorasan province, Iran.

== Demographics ==
=== Population ===
At the time of the 2006 National Census, the village's population was 193 in 47 households, when it was in Golestan Rural District of the Central District in Jajrom County. The following census in 2011 counted 185 people in 51 households, by which time the rural district had been separated from the county in the establishment of Garmeh County. It was transferred to the new Central District, and Qezel Hesar-e Pain was transferred to Bala Dasht Rural District created in the same district. The 2016 census measured the population of the village as 187 people in 52 households.
