= Armudlu, Iran =

Village in North Khorasan province, Iran

Armudlu Persian: ارمودلو
- Village
- Location within Iran
- Coordinates: 37°17′52″N 56°10′51″E
- Country: Iran
- Province: North Khorasan
- County: Garmeh
- District: Central
- Rural District: Golestan

Population (2016)
  - Total: 199
- Time zone: UTC+3:30 (IRST)

Armudlu (Persian: ارمودلو) (Note: Also romanized as Armoodloo and Ārmūdlū; also known as Ārmanlū, Ārmātlū, Armotlū, Armūtlī, and Yān Cheshmeh) is a village in Golestan Rural District of the Central District in Garmeh County, North Khorasan province, Iran.

== Demographics ==
=== Population ===
At the time of the 2006 National Census, the village's population was 211 in 52 households, when it was in the Central District of Jajrom County. The following census in 2011 counted 181 people in 57 households, by which time the rural district had been separated from the county in the establishment of Garmeh County. It was transferred to the new Central District. The 2016 census measured the population of the village as 199 people in 65 households.
