= Robat-e Qarah Bil =

Village in North Khorasan province, Iran

Robat-e Qarah Bil Persian: رباطقره بيل
- Village
- Location within Iran
- Coordinates: 37°21′12″N 56°19′33″E
- Country: Iran
- Province: North Khorasan
- County: Garmeh
- District: Central
- Rural District: Golestan

Population (2016)
  - Total: 866
- Time zone: UTC+3:30 (IRST)

Robat-e Qarah Bil (Persian: رباطقره بيل) (Note: Also romanized as Rebāţ-e-Qarehbīl, Robāţ-e Qarah Bīl, and Robāţ-e Qareh Bīl; also known as Ribāt-i-Qarabīl) is a village in, and the capital of, Golestan Rural District in the Central District of Garmeh County, North Khorasan province, Iran.

== Demographics ==
=== Population ===
At the time of the 2006 National Census, the village's population was 788 in 194 households, when it was in the Central District of Jajrom County. The following census in 2011 counted 794 people in 247 households, by which time the rural district had been separated from the county in the establishment of Garmeh County. It transferred to the new Central District. The 2016 census measured the population of the village as 866 people in 273 households.
