= Bidak, Garmeh =

Village in North Khorasan province, Iran

Bidak Persian: بيدك
- Village
- Location within Iran
- Coordinates: 37°15′43″N 55°55′40″E
- Country: Iran
- Province: North Khorasan
- County: Garmeh
- District: Central
- Rural District: Golestan

Population (2016)
  - Total: 376
- Time zone: UTC+3:30 (IRST)

Bidak (Persian: بيدك) (Note: Also romanized as Bīdak) is a village in Golestan Rural District of the Central District in Garmeh County, North Khorasan province, Iran.

== Demographics ==
=== Population ===
At the time of the 2006 National Census, the village's population was 439 in 111 households, when it was in the Central District of Jajrom County. The following census in 2011 counted 439 people in 124 households, by which time the rural district had been separated from the county in the establishment of Garmeh County. It was transferred to the new Central District. The 2016 census measured the population of the village as 376 people in 121 households.
