= Garmeh =

City in North Khorasan province, Iran

Garmeh Persian: گرمه
- City
- Location within Iran
- Coordinates: 36°59′11″N 56°17′17″E
- Country: Iran
- Province: North Khorasan
- County: Garmeh
- District: Central
- Established as a city: 2008

Population (2016)
  - Total: 10,993
- Time zone: UTC+3:30 (IRST)

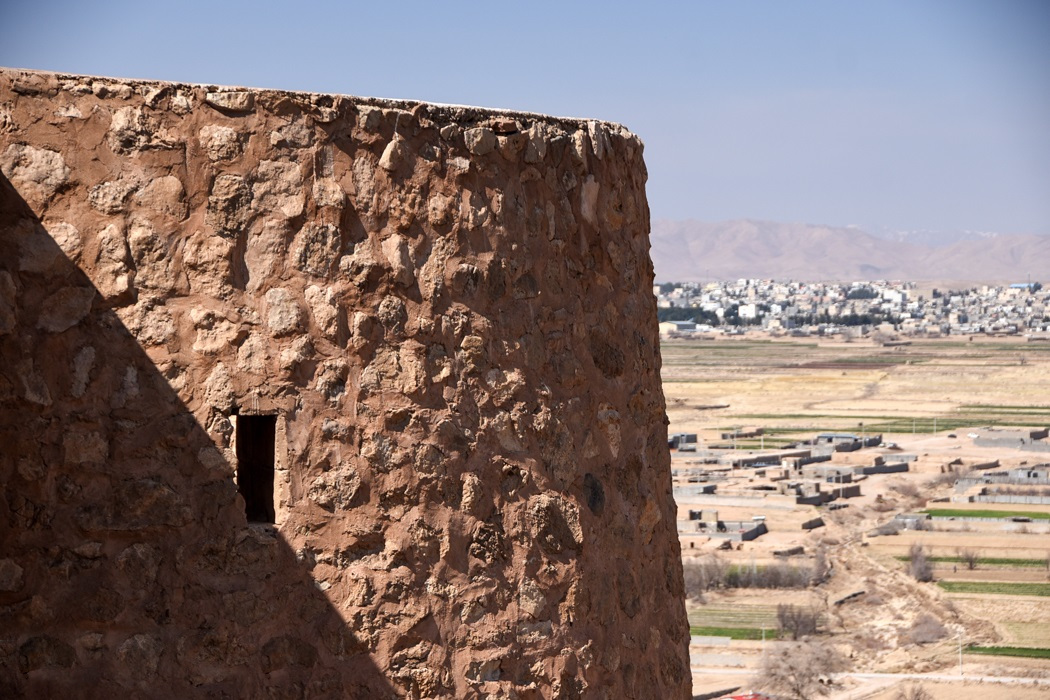
Jalaluddin Castle in Garmeh

Garmeh (Persian: گرمه) (Note: Formerly Jarmaq (جَرْمَق)) is a city in the Central District of Garmeh County, North Khorasan province, Iran, serving as capital of both the county and the district. Prior to the formation of the county, Garmeh was a part of the city of Jajrom in Jajrom County.

== History ==
In 2008, Golestan Rural District, parts of Miyan Dasht Rural District, and the city of Daraq, were separated from Jajrom County in the establishment of Garmeh County. The new county was divided into one district of two rural districts, with Garmeh as its capital.

== Demographics ==
=== Population ===
At the time of the 2011 National Census, the city's population was 10,716 people in 3,197 households. The 2016 census measured the population of the city as 10,993 people in 3,431 households.
