= Rahmatabad, North Khorasan =

Village in North Khorasan province, Iran

Rahmatabad Persian: رحمتاباد
- Village
- Location within Iran
- Coordinates: 36°46′02″N 56°38′53″E
- Country: Iran
- Province: North Khorasan
- County: Jajrom
- District: Central
- Rural District: Miyan Dasht

Population (2016)
  - Total: 94
- Time zone: UTC+3:30 (IRST)

Rahmatabad (Persian: رحمتاباد) (Note: Also romanized as Raḩmatābād) is a village in Miyan Dasht Rural District of the Central District in Jajrom County, North Khorasan province, Iran.

== Demographics ==
=== Population ===
At the time of the 2006 National Census, the village's population was 99 in 24 households. The following census in 2011 counted 54 people in 14 households. The 2016 census measured the population of the village as 94 people in 26 households.
