= Amirabad, Jajrom =

Village in North Khorasan province, Iran

Amirabad Persian: اميراباد
- Village
- Location within Iran
- Coordinates: 36°42′53″N 56°31′25″E
- Country: Iran
- Province: North Khorasan
- County: Jajrom
- District: Central
- Rural District: Miyan Dasht

Population (2016)
  - Total: 428
- Time zone: UTC+3:30 (IRST)

Amirabad (Persian: اميراباد) (Note: Also romanized as Amīrābād) is a village in, and the capital of, Miyan Dasht Rural District in the Central District of Jajrom County, North Khorasan province, Iran. The rural district was previously administered from the city of Eivar. Prior to this, the capital of the rural district was the village of Kalateh-ye Baqer.

== Demographics ==
=== Population ===
At the time of the 2006 National Census, the village's population was 489 in 130 households. The following census in 2011 counted 456 people in 144 households. The 2016 census measured the population of the village as 428 people in 144 households, the most populous in its rural district.
