= Sadeqabad, North Khorasan =

Village in North Khorasan province, Iran

Sadeqabad Persian: صادق اباد
- Village
- Location within Iran
- Coordinates: 36°43′21″N 56°35′32″E
- Country: Iran
- Province: North Khorasan
- County: Jajrom
- District: Central
- Rural District: Miyan Dasht

Population (2016)
  - Total: 353
- Time zone: UTC+3:30 (IRST)

Sadeqabad (Persian: صادق اباد) (Note: Also romanized as Şādeqābād) is a village in Miyan Dasht Rural District of the Central District in Jajrom County, North Khorasan province, Iran.

== Demographics ==
=== Population ===
At the time of the 2006 National Census, the village's population was 430 in 98 households. The following census in 2011 counted 376 people in 97 households. The 2016 census measured the population of the village as 353 people in 108 households.
