= Marghzar =

Marghzar or Morghzar or Morgh Zar or Murgh Zar (Persian: مرغزار) may refer to:

- Marghzar, Ardabil
- Marghzar, Faruj, North Khorasan
- Morghzar, Jajrom, North Khorasan
- Marghzar, Shirvan, North Khorasan
- Marghzar, Razavi Khorasan
- Marghzar, South Khorasan

== See also ==
- Murghazar, Pakistan
