= Eivar, North Khorasan =

City in North Khorasan province, Iran

Eivar Persian: ايور
- City
- Location within Iran
- Coordinates: 36°58′06″N 56°15′41″E
- Country: Iran
- Province: North Khorasan
- County: Garmeh
- District: Central
- Established as a city: 2007

Population (2016)
  - Total: 3,994
- Time zone: UTC+3:30 (IRST)

Eivar (Persian: ايور) (Note: Also romanized as Eīvar) is a city in the Central District of Garmeh County, North Khorasan province, Iran. It was the administrative center for Miyan Dasht Rural District of the Central District of Jajrom County until its capital was transferred to the village of Amirabad.

== Demographics ==
=== Population ===
At the time of the 2006 National Census, Eivar's population was 4,664 in 1,095 households, when it was a village in Miyan Dasht Rural District of the Central District in Jajrom County. The following census in 2011 counted 3,783 people in 1,021 households, by which time the village had been converted to a city. In 2008, Eivar was separated from the county in the establishment of Garmeh County and transferred to the new Central District. The 2016 census measured the population of the city as 3,994 people in 1,171 households.
