= Qezel Hesar =

Qezel Hesar or Qezel Hasar (Persian: قزل حصار), also Qizil Hisar, may refer to:

== Alborz Province ==
- Qezel Hesar, Karaj
- Qezel Hesar, Nazarabad
- Ghezel Hesar Prison near Karaj

== Hamadan Province ==
- Qezel Hesar, Hamadan

== North Khorasan Province ==
- Qezel Hesar, North Khorasan
- Qezel Hesar-e Bala
- Qezel Hesar-e Pain

== Razavi Khorasan Province ==
- Qezel Hesar, Chenaran
