= Jameh Mosque of Jajarm =

Shi'ite mosque in Jajarm, Iran

- مسجد جامع جاجرم
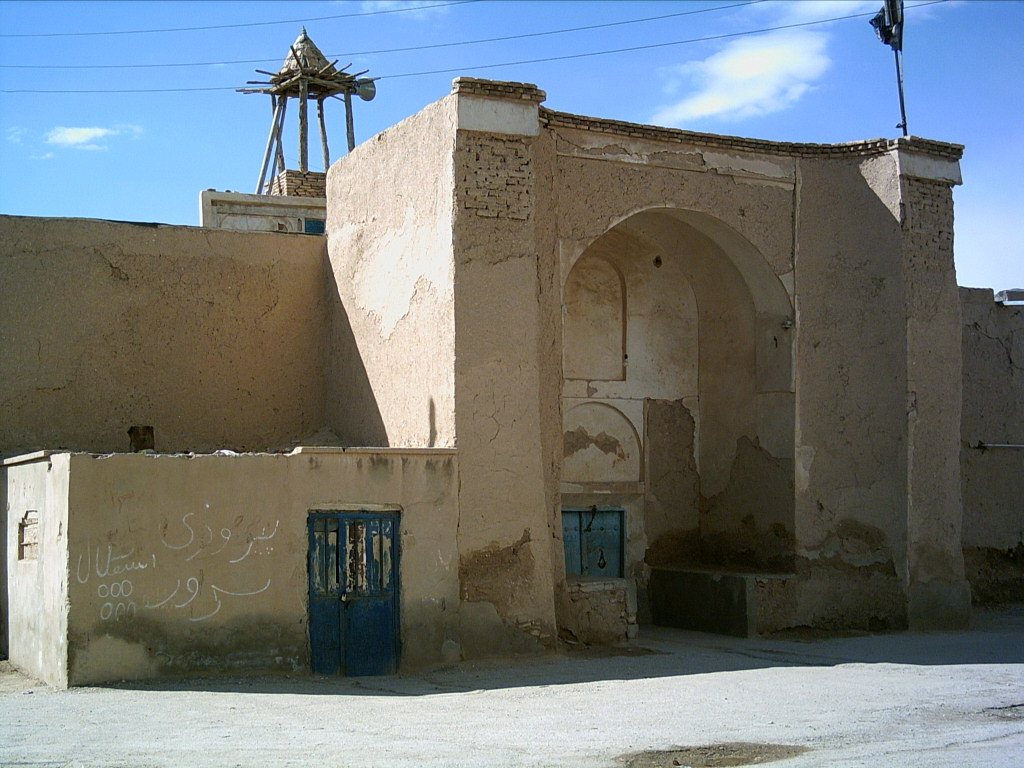
- Entrance to the mosque in 2016

Religion
- Affiliation: Shia Islam
- Ecclesiastical or organizational status: Friday mosque
- Status: Active

Location
- Location: Jajarm, North Khorasan Province
- Interactive map of Jameh Mosque of Jajarm
- Coordinates: 36°56′45″N 56°23′01″E

Architecture
- Type: Mosque architecture
- Completed: 4th century AH (10–11th century CE)
- Dome: One

Iran National Heritage List
- Official name: Jameh Mosque of Jajarm
- Type: Built
- Designated: 23 January 1978
- Reference no.: 1580
- Conservation organization: Cultural Heritage, Handicrafts and Tourism Organization of Iran

The Jameh Mosque of Jajarm (Persian: مسجد جامع جاجرم; Arabic: جامع جاجرم) is a Shi'ite Friday mosque, located inside the city of Jajarm, in the province of North Khorasan, Iran. The mosque was completed in the 4th century AH (10–11th century CE).

The mosque was added to the Iran National Heritage List on 23 January 1978 and is administered by the Cultural Heritage, Handicrafts and Tourism Organization of Iran.

== See also ==
- List of mosques in Iran
- Shia Islam in Iran
