= Besh Qardash =

Mausoleum and mineral spring complex in Bojnord, North Khorasan, Iran

- بش قارداش
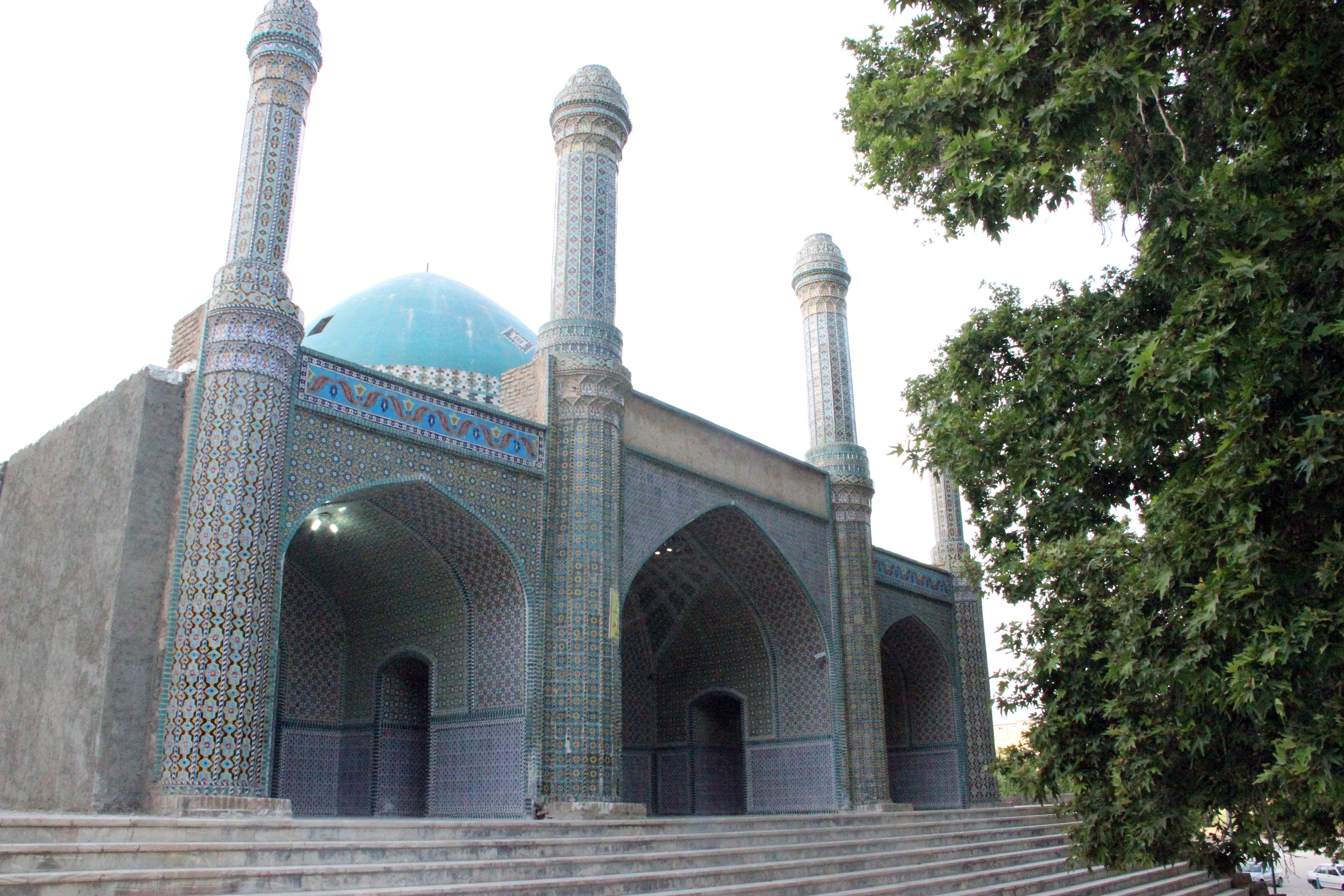
- The mausoleum in 2013

- Location of the complex in Iran

Religion
- Affiliation: Islam
- Ecclesiastical or organizational status: Mausoleum and mineral spring complex
- Status: Active

Location
- Location: near Bojnord, North Khorasan province
- Country: Iran
- Interactive map of Besh Qardash
- Coordinates: 37°24′N 57°17′E

Architecture
- Style: Qajar; Pahlavi

Specifications
- Dome: One
- Dome height (outer): 12 m (39 ft)
- Minaret: Four
- Site area: 380 ha (940 acres)
- Monument: One: Sardar Mofakham
- Materials: Bricks; tiles
- Elevation: 1,189 m (3,901 ft)
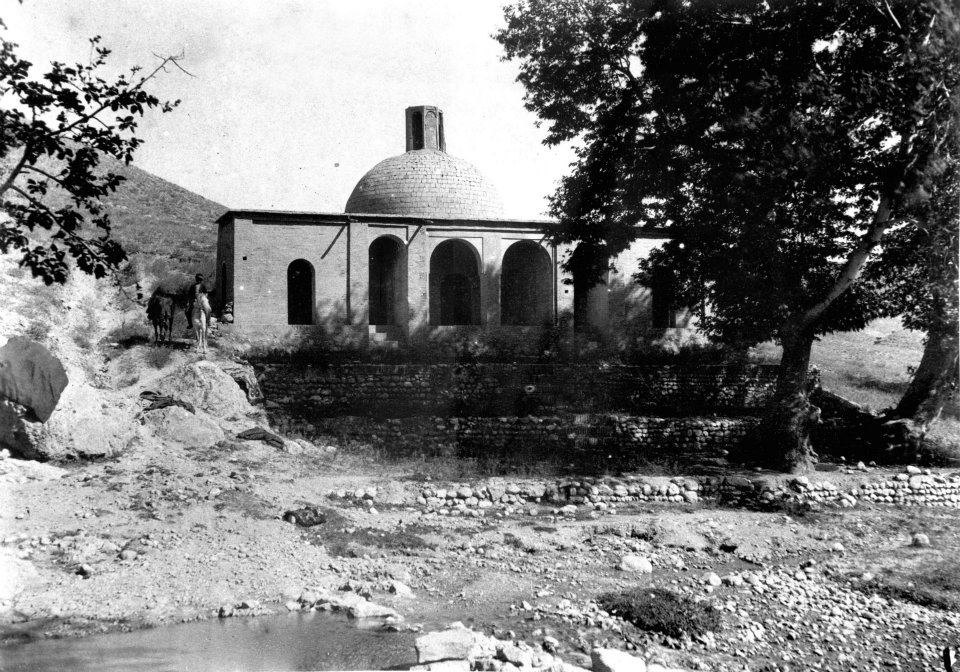
- Besh Qardash in Qajar era

Iran National Heritage List
- Official name: Besh Qardash
- Type: Built
- Designated: 1 January 2002
- Reference no.: 4575
- Conservation organization: Cultural Heritage, Handicrafts and Tourism Organization of Iran

Besh Qardash or Besh Ghardash (Persian: بش قارداش) is a mausoleum and mineral spring complex, located near Bojnord, in the province of North Khorasan, Iran.

The mausoleum was added to the Iran National Heritage List on 1 January 2002 and is administered by the Cultural Heritage, Handicrafts and Tourism Organization of Iran. The complex is an entertainment and tourism attraction, located on the Bojnord-Esfarayen road, approximately 7 kilometres (4.3 mi) from Bojnord.

== History ==
The term "Besh Qardash" means "Five Brothers" in the Khorasani Turkic language, a local language in the region. Besh Qardash refers to the mythic history of the place that there were five brothers fighting against the then-brutal government and when they harbored to a hillside, they disappeared and five water springs trilled.

Before Islam, the site was initially developed during the Parthian, Ashkanid and Sasanid eras, when it served as a settlement for Zoroastrian priests and magis. It came to be known as Chaharmoghan, or Four Magi. The water of these springs was called Chahrmoghan or Charmoghan.

In the Qajar era, Naser al-Din Shah passed the place in his state visit and ordered Yar Mohammad Khan Shadlou (also known as Sardar Mufakham or Siham al-Dowleh Bojnordi) to construct a monument right next to the springs.

== Facilities ==
At the heart of Besh Qardash stands a historical mausoleum, the resting place to Sardar Mofakham, a prominent ruler during the late Qajar period. The structure comprises a 12-metre-high (39 ft) tiled dome, brickwork, and four intricate minarets.

The complex's therapeutic springs, originating from five stone cracks, converge to form the Chaharmoghan River, which flows through nearby villages before joining the Sumbar River. These mineral-rich springs are believed to have healing properties, attracting visitors seeking wellness alongside leisure.

Besh Qardash is a scenic retreat comprising approximately 380 hectares (940 acres) and is a well-equipped tourist hub offering a range of amenities, including botanical gardens, swimming pools and fish ponds, historical structures that include paved routes, stone staircases, and decorative fountains reminiscent of Persian architectural traditions. Cultural and recreational facilities include restaurants and a motel, sports grounds, and cultural camps. The botanic gardens contain towering sycamore trees, and various species of native flora, including Shiraz cypress, wild hawthorn, and maple.

== Gallery ==
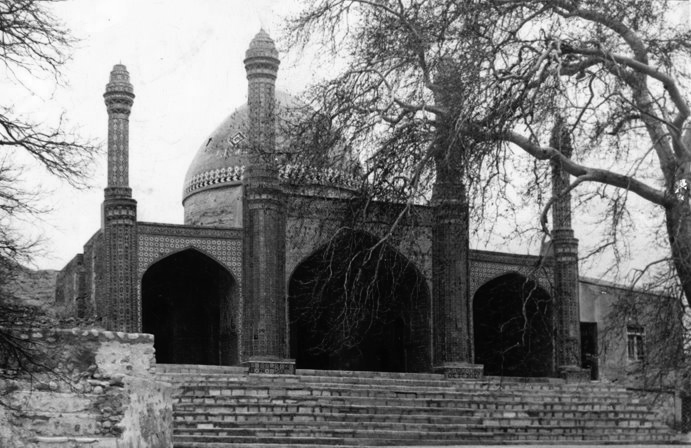
Besh Qardash in Pahlavi era

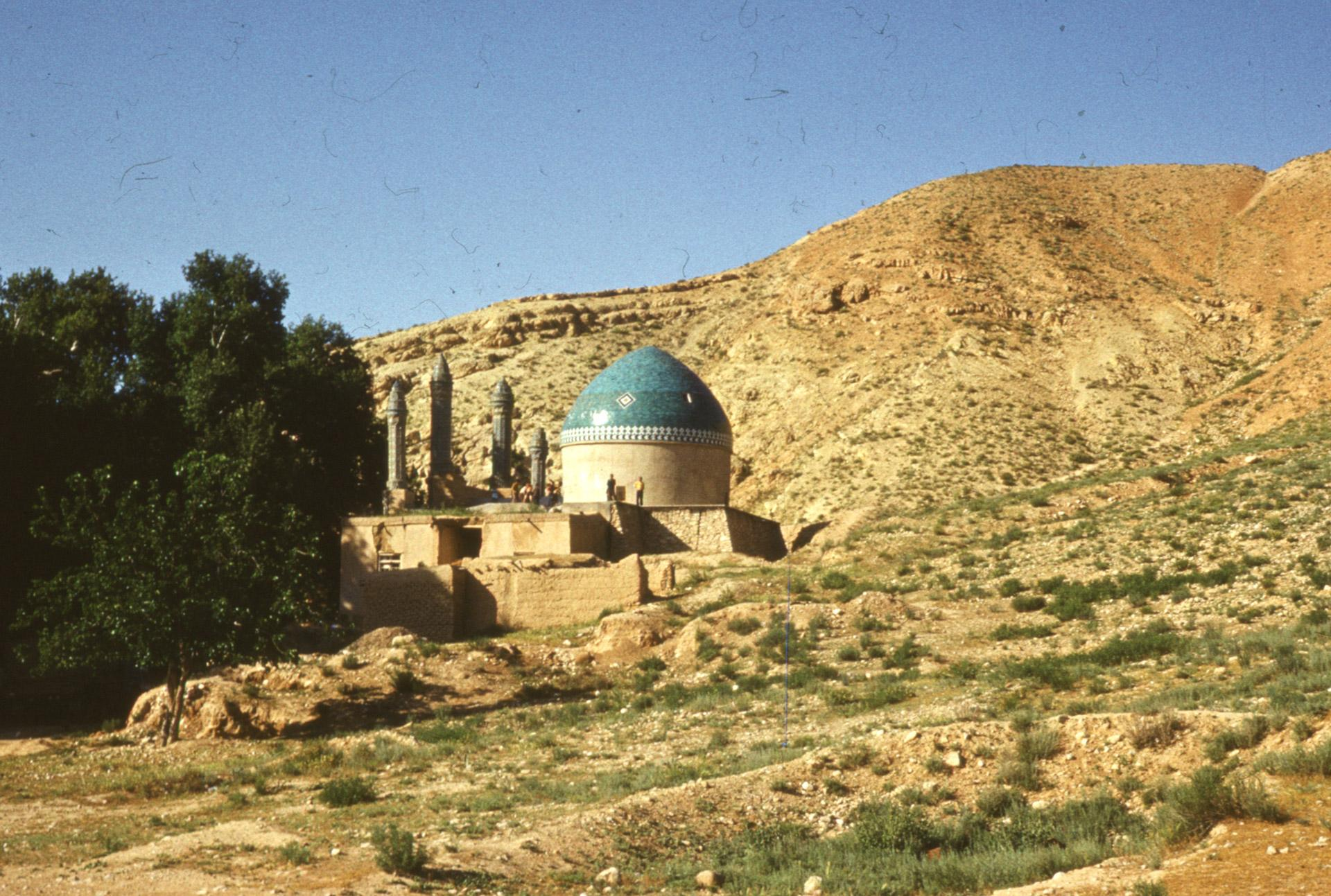
View of the mausoleum in 1976

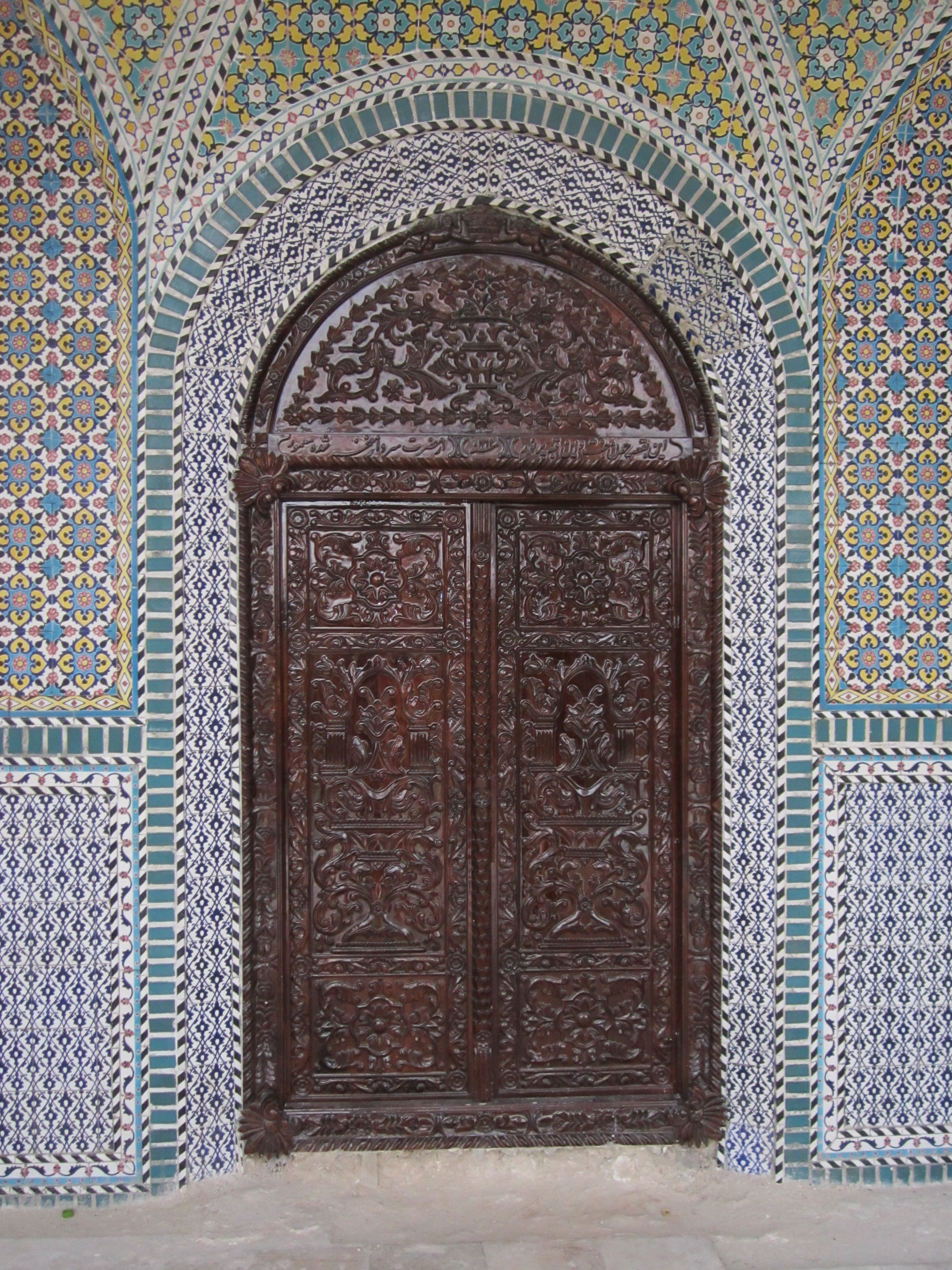
Gate to Sardar Mufakham's tomb

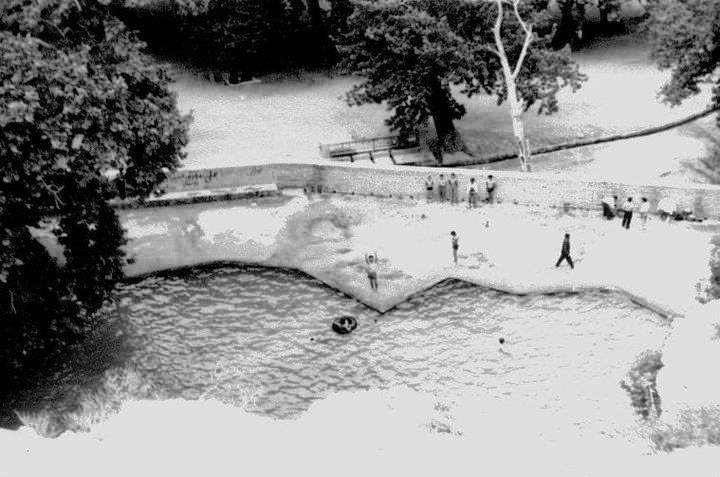
Crown shape of the pool before renovation

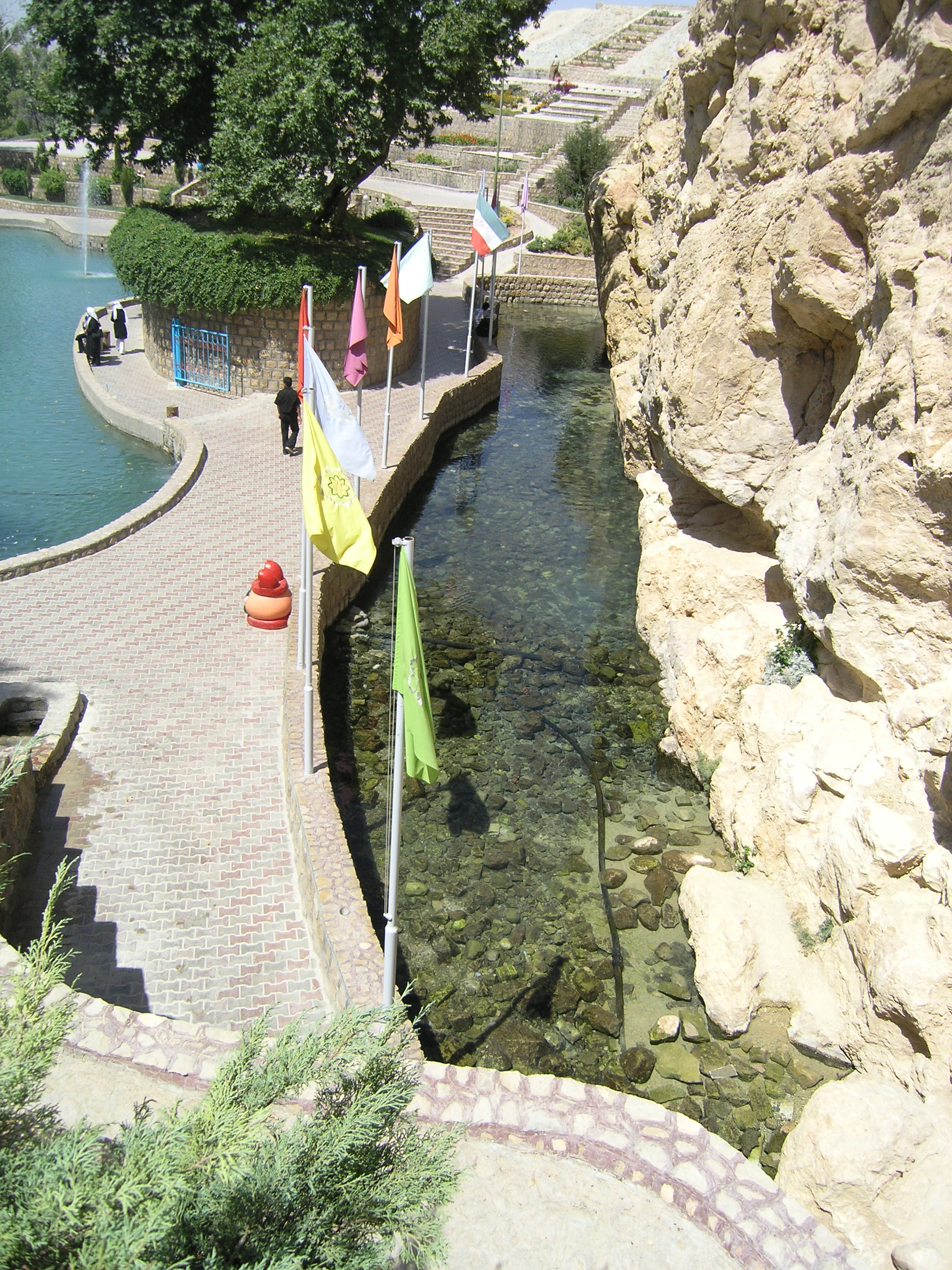
A view of Besh Qardash water spring

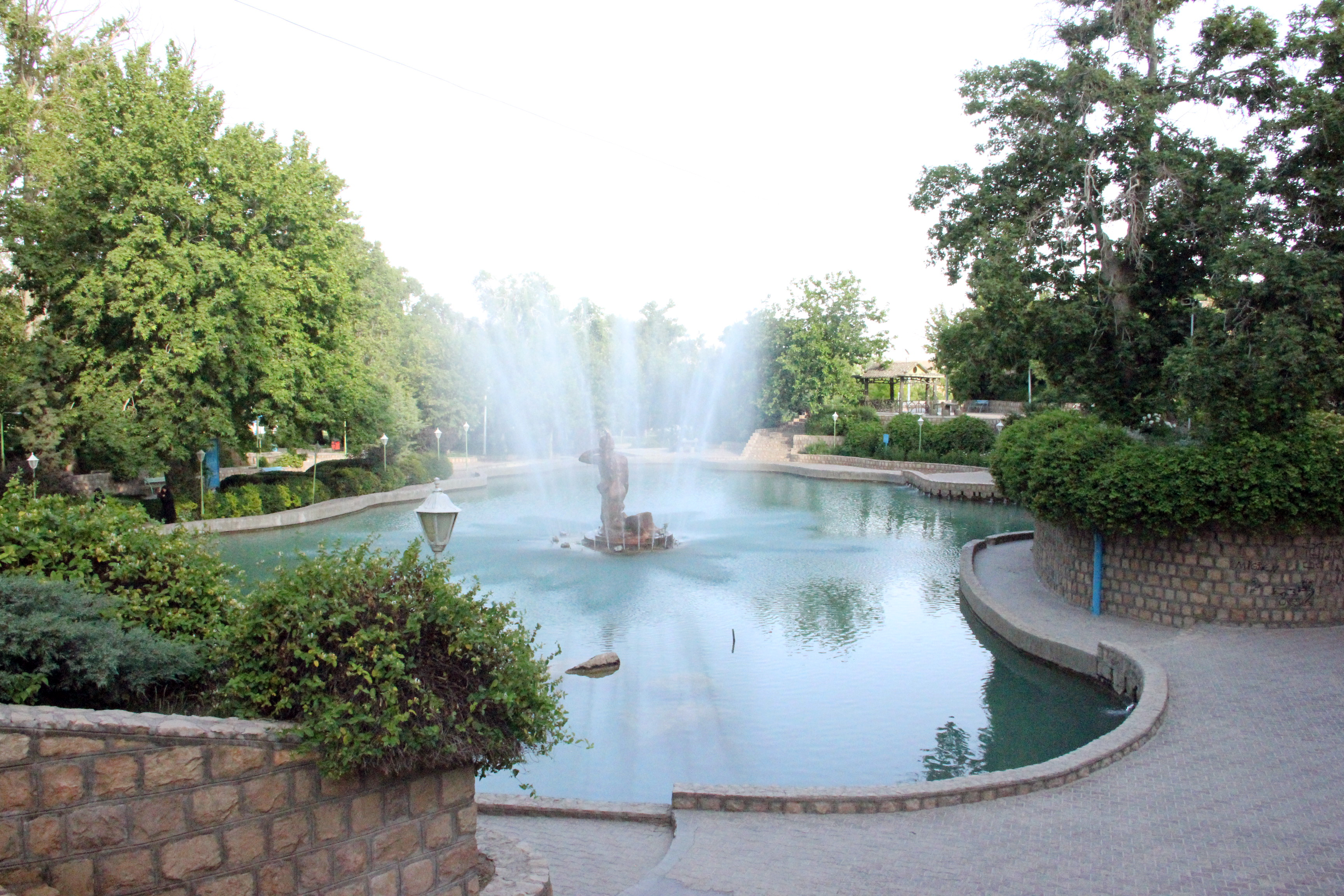
Besh Qardash pool

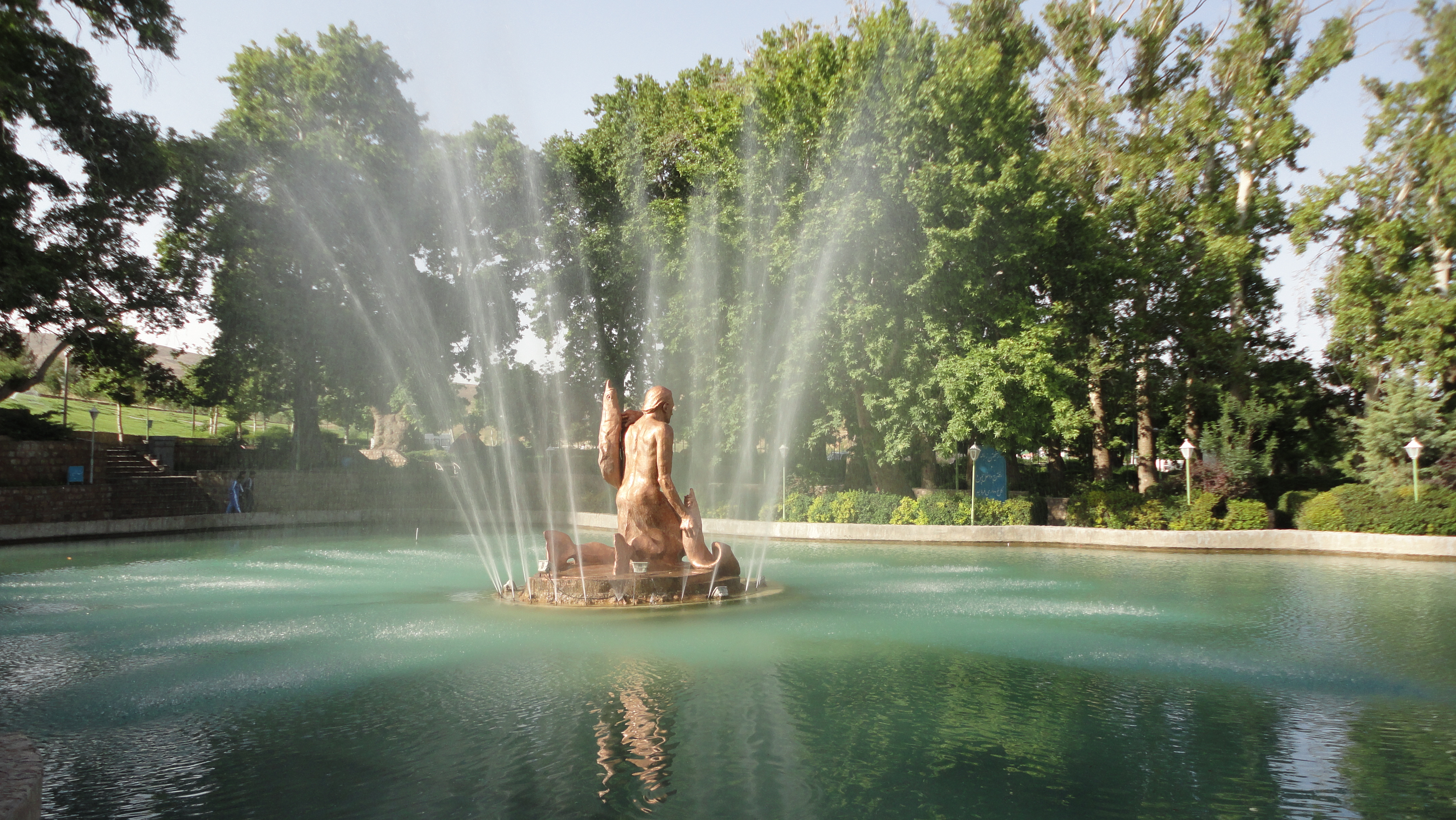
Besh Qardash pool

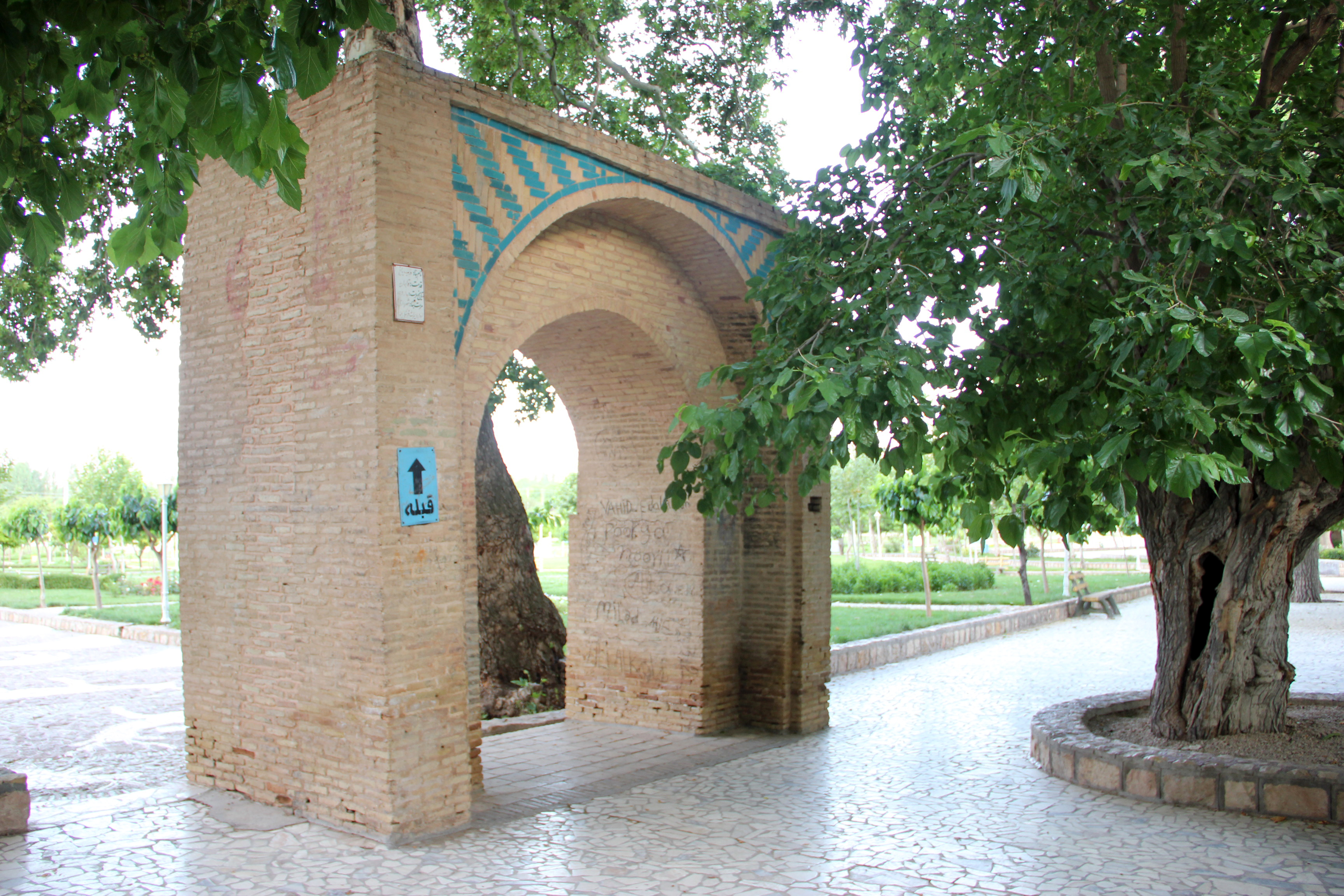
The garden gate which belongs to Qajar era

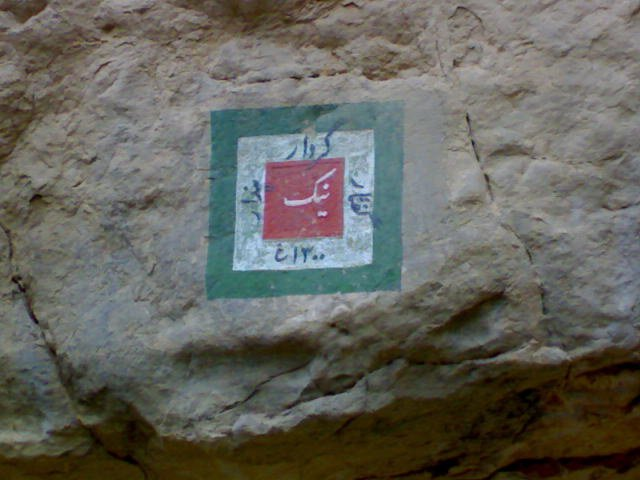
The Zoroaster's message "Good thoughts, Good words and Good deeds" on a stone over the spring

== See also ==
- List of mausoleums in Iran
- Islam in Iran
