= Jajarm =

City in North Khorasan province, Iran

Jajarm Persian: جاجرم
- City
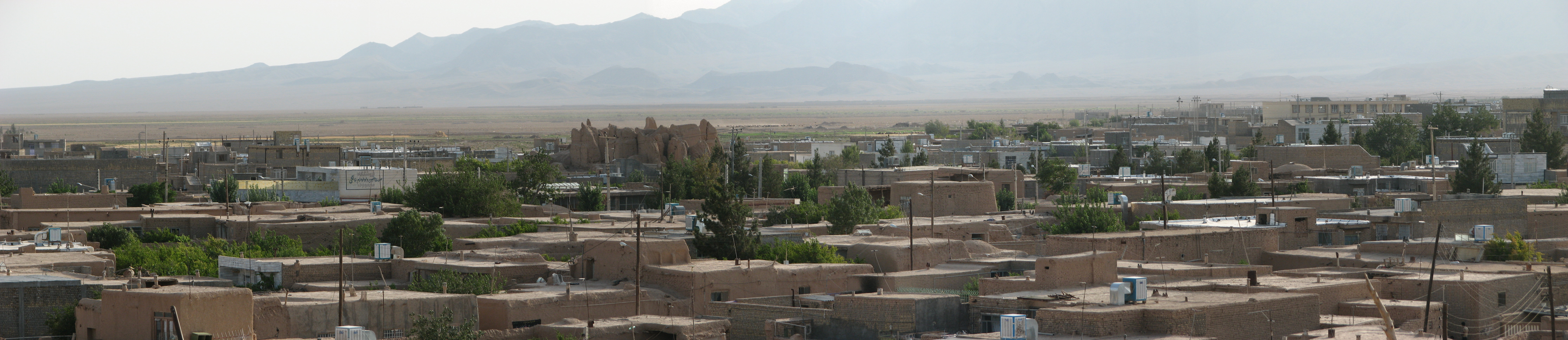
- Panoramic view of Jajarm from Narin Qaleh

- Location within Iran
- Coordinates: 36°57′00″N 56°22′48″E
- City: Iran
- Province: North Khorasan
- County: Jajarm
- District: Central
- Elevation: 1,000 m (3,300 ft)

Population (2016)
  - Total: 19,580
- Time zone: UTC+3:30 (IRST)

Jajarm (Persian: جاجرم) (Note: Also romanized as Jājarm and Jājarm) is a city in the Central District of Jajarm, North Khorasan province, Iran, serving as capital of both the county and the district.

== Demographics ==
=== Population ===
At the time of the 2006 National Census, Jajarm had been joined with Garmeh since 1998 as the city of Garmeh-ye Jajarm, whose population was 24,368 in 6,332 households. The following census in 2011 counted 18,547 people in 4,985 households for the city of Jajarm, which had been separated from Garmeh-ye Jajarm as an independent unit once more. The 2016 census measured the population of the city as 19,580 people in 5,616 households.

Because of several historical and archeological sites, Jajarm is one of the most attractive cities in North Khorasan province. The city is placed on the border of Central Desert of Iran and has unique vegetation. Jajarm is also known for its wildlife refuge in which Iranian cheetahs live. The city has several bauxite mines and a plant is producing alumina from bauxite.

== Historical sites ==
Northeastern Iran has not been explored archaeologically until recently, but now a lot of work is being done. Archaeological fieldwork in North Khorassan has already shown the richness of prehistoric cultures in the region.

=== Tepe Pahlavan ===
Tepe Pahlavan (Tappeh Pahlavan) is a prehistoric site near Jajarm. It is a large Neolithic-Chalcolithic craft production site, located between the Alborz Mountains in the north, and the vast desert of Dasht-e Khavir in the south.

In 2014, an Iranian-German team carried out the first systematic excavations at Tappe Pahlavan.

The upper settlement horizon has been dated to the early sixth millennium BC. These are the earliest dates so far for the ceramic Neolithic period in Northeast Iran. The connections with the contemporary sites in Northeast Iran are evident, but also with the sites in Kopet Dag, 200 km to the east.

The ceramics are similar to the Cheshmeh Ali type. The Cheshmeh Ali cultural complex generally defines a Transitional Chalcolithic on the Iranian Central Plateau dating between 5500 and 4800 BC. Yet the radiocarbon dates at Pahlavan precede this period by 500 years. So Cheshmeh Ali type ceramics here may be a unique early local development.

The Jeitun ceramics, very common in Northeast Iran and southern Turkmenistan, are not found in Pahlavan. There is also very little evidence of agricultural activities here. Rather, this settlement seems to have been mostly occupied with bead production, processing the local semi-precious stone deposits.

=== Jorbat ===
Petroglyphic site of Jorbat (This area is locally known as Sang Neveshteh or the "inscribed stone") to the north of the plain of Jajarm is one of the largest rock-art complexes of Iran. Ranging from late Bronze Age to the ethnographic period, the rock art imagery of Jorbat has close parallels both in petroglyphic sites of the Central plateau of Iran and the Central Asian steppes.

== Transport ==
The city has a railway station which is counted as a separate abadi in the Iranian census. At the time of the 2006 National Census, the population living near the station was 237 in 59 households. The following census in 2011 counted 198 people in 57 households. The 2016 census measured the population around the station as 220 people in 75 households.

== Sources ==
- Jajarm at GEOnet Names Server
- اطلس گیتاشناسی استان‌های ایران [Atlas Gitashenasi Ostanhai Iran] (Gitashenasi Province Atlas of Iran)
