= Miyan Dasht Rural District =

Rural district in North Khorasan province, Iran

Miyan Dasht Rural District Persian: دهستان ميان دشت
- Rural District
- Location within Iran
- Coordinates: 36°52′N 56°23′E
- Country: Iran
- Province: North Khorasan
- County: Jajrom
- District: Central
- Established: 1987
- Capital: Amirabad

Population (2016)
  - Total: 1,227
- Time zone: UTC+3:30 (IRST)

Miyan Dasht Rural District (Persian: دهستان ميان دشت) is in the Central District of Jajrom County, North Khorasan province, Iran. Its capital is the village of Amirabad. The rural district was previously administered from the city of Eivar. Prior to this, the capital of the rural district was the village of Kalateh-ye Baqer.

== Demographics ==
=== Population ===
At the time of the 2006 National Census, the rural district's population was 6,010 in 1,421 households. There were 1,140 inhabitants in 323 households at the following census of 2011. The 2016 census measured the population of the rural district as 1,227 in 402 households. The most populous of its 35 villages was Amirabad, with 428 people.

=== Other villages in the rural district ===
- Borj-e Aqa
- Istgah-e Jajrom
- Rahmatabad
- Sadeqabad
