= Daraq =

City in North Khorasan province, Iran

Daraq Persian: درق
- City
- Location within Iran
- Coordinates: 36°58′24″N 56°12′50″E
- Country: Iran
- Province: North Khorasan
- County: Garmeh
- District: Central
- Established as a city: 2005

Population (2016)
  - Total: 4,926
- Time zone: UTC+3:30 (IRST)

Daraq (Persian: درق) is a city in the Central District of Garmeh County, North Khorasan province, Iran. The village of Daraq was converted to a city in 2005.

== Demographics ==
=== Population ===
At the time of the 2006 National Census, the city's population was 4,594 in 1,012 households, when it was in the Central District of Jajrom County. The following census in 2011 counted 5,153 people in 1,351 households, by which time Daraq had been separated from the county in the establishment of Garmeh County. The city was transferred to the new Central District. The 2016 census measured the population of the city as 4,926 people in 1,429 households.
