= Golestan Rural District (Garmeh County) =

Rural district in North Khorasan province, Iran

Golestan Rural District Persian: دهستان گلستان
- Rural District
- Location within Iran
- Coordinates: 37°12′N 56°11′E
- Country: Iran
- Province: North Khorasan
- County: Garmeh
- District: Central
- Established: 1987
- Capital: Robat-e Qarah Bil

Population (2016)
  - Total: 3,510
- Time zone: UTC+3:30 (IRST)

Golestan Rural District (Persian: دهستان گلستان) is in the Central District of Garmeh County, North Khorasan province, Iran. Its capital is the village of Robat-e Qarah Bil.

== Demographics ==
=== Population ===
At the time of the 2006 National Census, the rural district's population (as a part of the Central District of Jajrom County) was 4,734 in 1,236 households. There were 3,371 inhabitants in 1,038 households at the following census of 2011, by which time the rural district had been separated from the county in the establishment of Garmeh County. It was transferred to the new Central District. The 2016 census measured the population of the rural district as 3,510 in 1,111 households. The most populous of its 24 villages was Dasht, with 1,393 people.

=== Other villages in the rural district ===
- Armudlu
- Bidak
- Cheshmeh Khan
- Golmandarreh
