= Central District (Garmeh County) =

District in North Khorasan province, Iran

Central District (Garmeh County) Persian: بخش مرکزی شهرستان گرمه
- District
- Location within Iran
- Coordinates: 37°06′N 56°18′E
- Country: Iran
- Province: North Khorasan
- County: Garmeh
- Established: 2008
- Capital: Garmeh

Population (2016)
  - Total: 25,475
- Time zone: UTC+3:30 (IRST)

The Central District of Garmeh County (Persian: بخش مرکزی شهرستان گرمه) is in North Khorasan province, Iran. Its capital is the city of Garmeh.

== History ==
After the 2006 National Census, Golestan Rural District, parts of Miyan Dasht Rural District, and the city of Daraq, were separated from Jajrom County in the establishment of Garmeh County, which was divided into one district of two rural districts, with Garmeh as its capital.

== Demographics ==
=== Population ===
At the time of the 2011 National Census, the district's population was 24,599 people in 7,039 households. The 2016 census measured the population of the district as 25,475 inhabitants in 7,748 households.

=== Administrative divisions ===
Central District (Garmeh County) Population
Administrative Divisions	2011	2016
Bala Dasht RD	1,576	2,112
Golestan RD	3,371	3,510
Daraq (city)	5,153	4,926
Eivar (city)	3,783	3,994
Garmeh (city)	10,716	10,933
Total	24,599	25,475
RD = Rural District
