= Garmeh County =

County in North Khorasan province, Iran

Garmeh County Persian: شهرستان گرمه
- County
- Location of Garmeh County in North Khorasan province (bottom left, green)

- Location of North Khorasan province in Iran
- Coordinates: 37°06′N 56°18′E
- Country: Iran
- Province: North Khorasan
- Established: 2008
- Capital: Garmeh
- Districts: Central

Population (2016)
  - Total: 25,475
- Time zone: UTC+3:30 (IRST)

Garmeh County (Persian: شهرستان گرمه) is in North Khorasan province, Iran. Its capital is the city of Garmeh.

== History ==
In 2008, Golestan Rural District, parts of Miyan Dasht Rural District, and the city of Daraq were separated from Jajrom County in the establishment of Garmeh County, which was divided into one district of two rural districts, with Garmeh as its capital.

== Demographics ==
=== Population ===
At the time of the 2011 National Census, the county's population was 24,599 people in 7,039 households. The 2016 census measured the population of the county as 25,475 in 7,748 households.

=== Administrative divisions ===
Garmeh County's population history and administrative structure over two consecutive censuses are shown in the following table.

Garmeh County Population
Administrative Divisions	2011	2016
Central District	24,599	25,475
Bala Dasht RD	1,576	2,112
Golestan RD	3,371	3,510
Daraq (city)	5,153	4,926
Eivar (city)	3,783	3,994
Garmeh (city)	10,716	10,933
Total	24,599	25,475
RD = Rural District

== See also ==
Media related to Garmeh County at Wikimedia Commons
