= Central District (Jajrom County) =

District in North Khorasan province, Iran

Central District (Jajrom County) Persian: بخش مرکزی شهرستان جاجرم
- District
- Location within Iran
- Coordinates: 36°52′N 56°23′E
- Country: Iran
- Province: North Khorasan
- County: Jajrom
- Established: 1997
- Capital: Jajrom

Population (2016)
  - Total: 20,807
- Time zone: UTC+3:30 (IRST)

The Central District of Jajrom County (Persian: بخش مرکزی شهرستان جاجرم) is in North Khorasan province, Iran. Its capital is the city of Jajrom.

== History ==
In 2008, Golestan Rural District, the city of Daraq, parts of Miyan Dasht Rural District, and parts of the city of Jajrom, were separated from the district in the establishment of Garmeh County.

== Demographics ==
=== Population ===
At the time of the 2006 National Census, the district's population was 39,706 in 10,001 households. The following census in 2011 counted 19,687 people in 5,308 households. The 2016 census measured the population of the district as 20,807 inhabitants in 6,018 households.

=== Administrative divisions ===
Central District (Jajrom County) Population
Administrative Divisions	2006	2011	2016
Golestan RD (Note: Transferred to Garmeh County)	4,734		
Miyan Dasht RD (Note: Portions transferred to Garmeh County)	6,010	1,140	1,227
Daraq (city)	4,594		
Jajrom (city)	24,368	18,547	19,580
Total	39,706	19,687	20,807
RD = Rural District
