= Jajrom County =

County in North Khorasan province, Iran

Jajrom County Persian: شهرستان جاجرم
- County
- Location of Jajrom County in North Khorasan province (bottom, yellow)

- Location of North Khorasan province in Iran
- Coordinates: 37°02′N 56°36′E
- Country: Iran
- Province: North Khorasan
- Established: 1997
- Capital: Jajrom
- Districts: Central, Jolgeh Sankhvast, Jolgeh Shuqan

Population (2016)
  - Total: 36,673
- Time zone: UTC+3:30 (IRST)

Jajrom County (Persian: شهرستان جاجرم) is in North Khorasan province, Iran. Its capital is the city of Jajrom.

== History ==
In 2008, Golestan Rural District, the city of Daraq, parts of Miyan Dasht Rural District, and parts of the city of Jajrom were separated from the Central District in the establishment of Garmeh County.

== Demographics ==
=== Population ===
At the time of the 2006 National Census, the county's population was 57,349, in 14,803 households. The following census in 2011 counted 36,898 people in 10,532 households. The 2016 census measured the population of the county as 36,673 in 11,154 households.

=== Administrative divisions ===
Jajrom County's population history and administrative structure over three consecutive censuses are shown in the following table.

Jajrom County Population
Administrative Divisions	2006	2011	2016
Central District	39,706	19,687	20,807
Golestan RD (Note: Transferred to Garmeh County)	4,734		
Miyan Dasht RD (Note: Portions transferred to Garmeh County)	6,010	1,140	1,227
Daraq (city)	4,594		
Jajrom (city)	24,368	18,547	19,580
Jolgeh Sankhvast District	7,796	7,544	6,881
Chahardeh Sankhvast RD	2,257	1,970	1,761
Darband RD	3,530	3,454	3,043
Sankhvast (city)	2,009	2,120	2,077
Jolgeh Shuqan District (Note: Formerly Dashtkuh District)	9,847	9,667	8,985
Shuqan RD (Note: Formerly Jolgeh Shuqan Rural District)	2,538	2,520	2,497
Tabar RD	5,012	4,711	4,175
Shuqan (city)	2,297	2,436	2,313
Total	57,349	36,898	36,673
RD = Rural District

== See also ==
Media related to Jajarm County at Wikimedia Commons
