= North Khorasan province =

Province of Iran

North Khorasan Province استان خراسان شمالی (Persian)
- Province
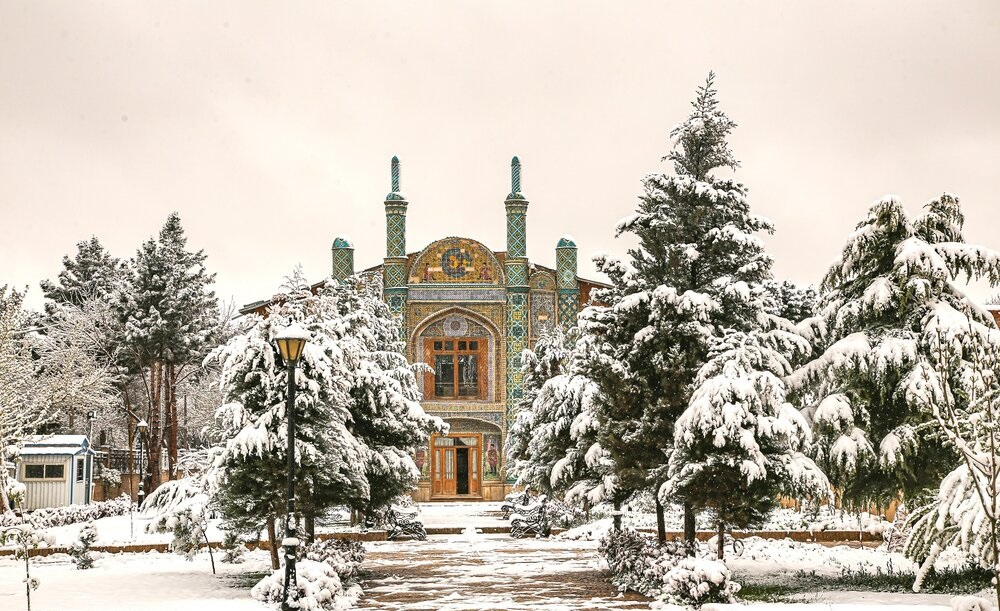
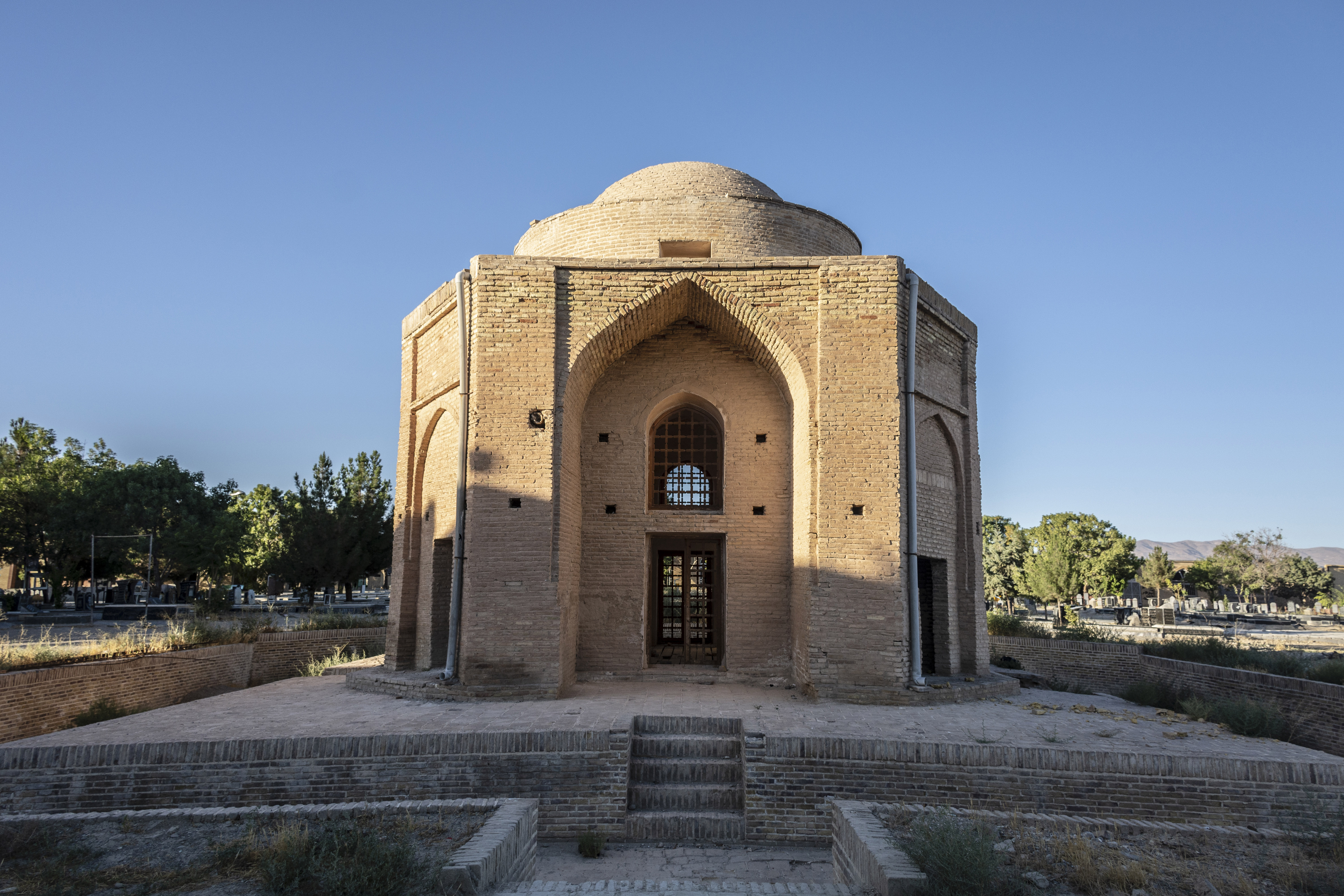
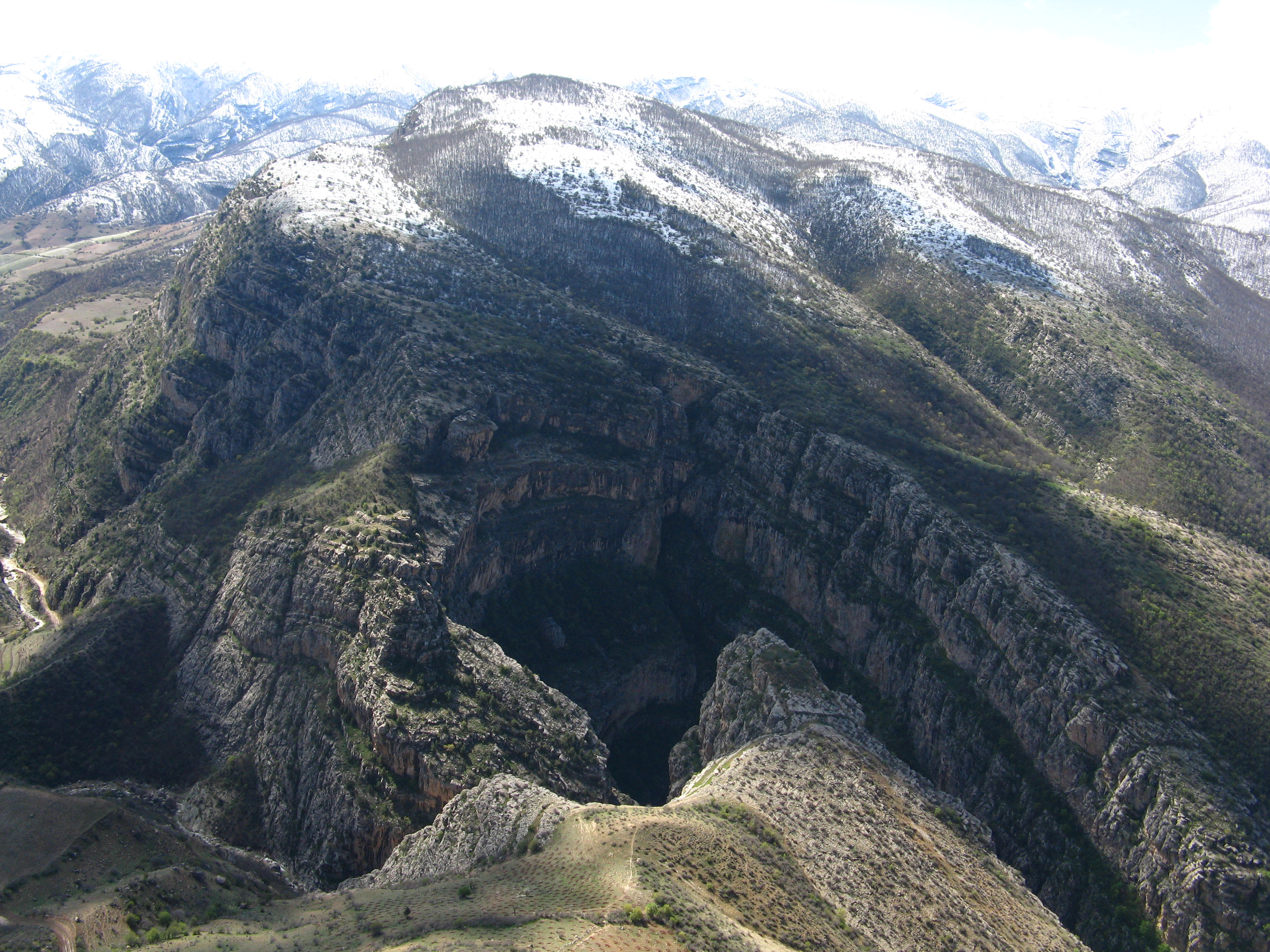
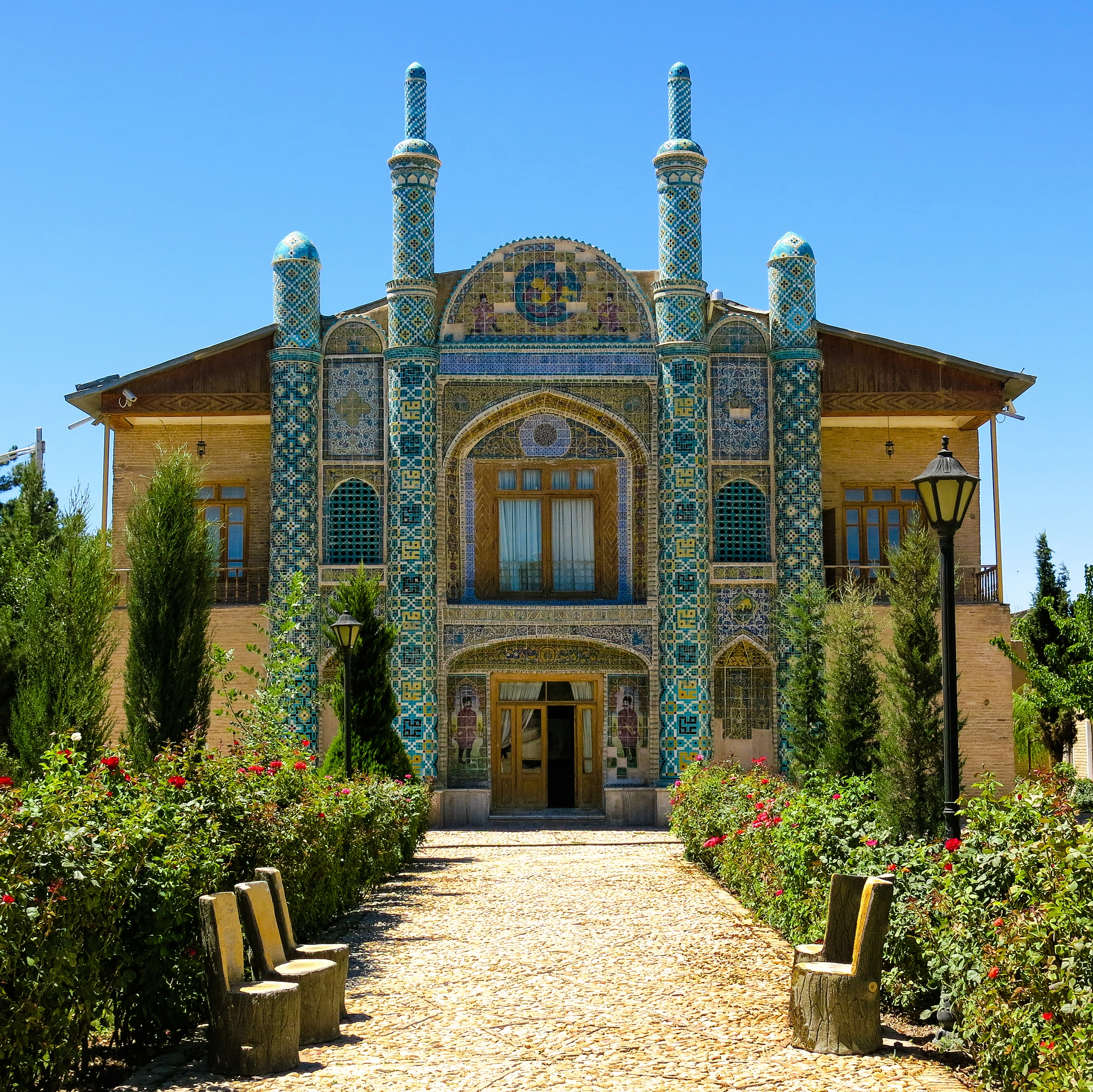
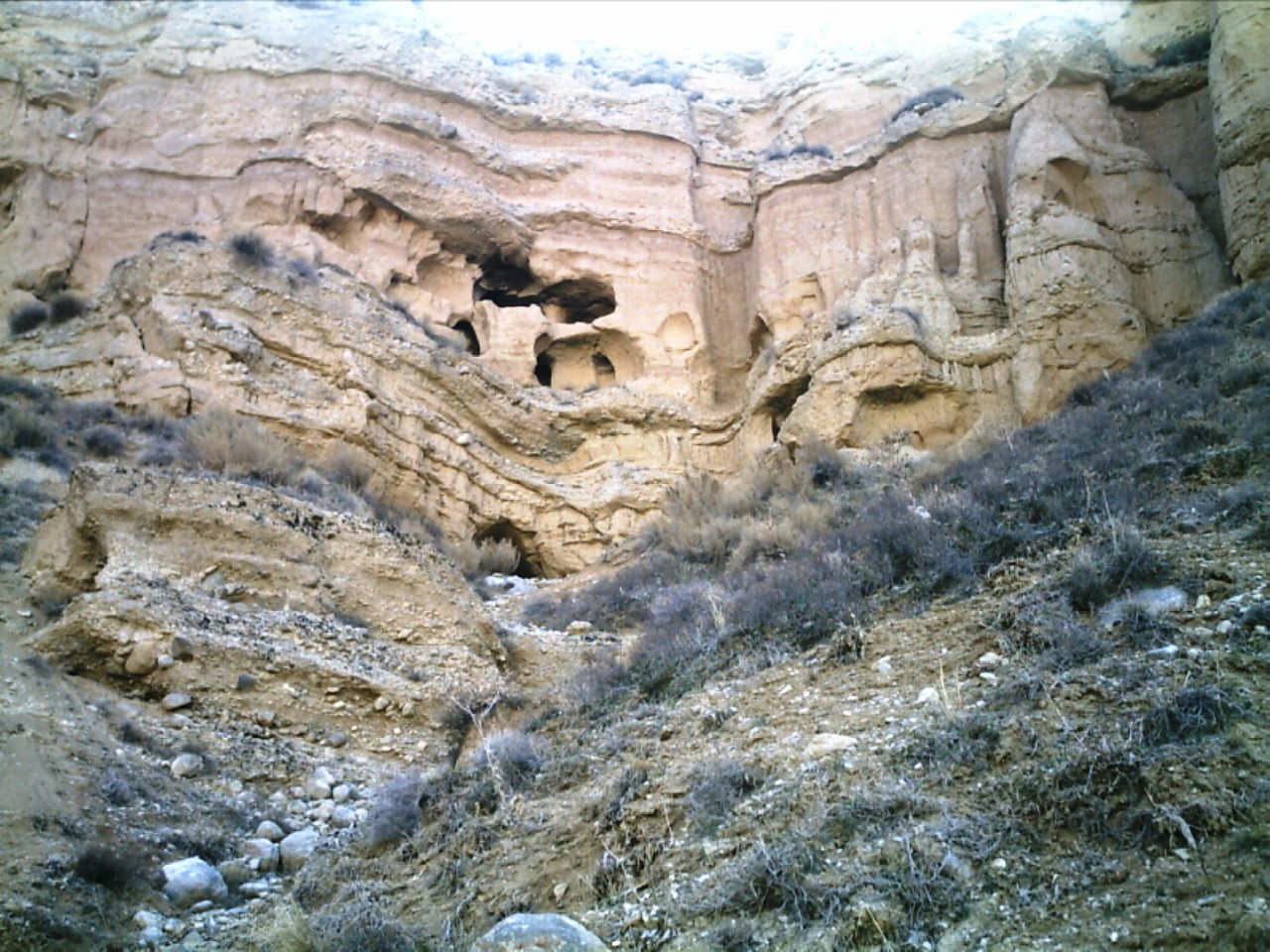
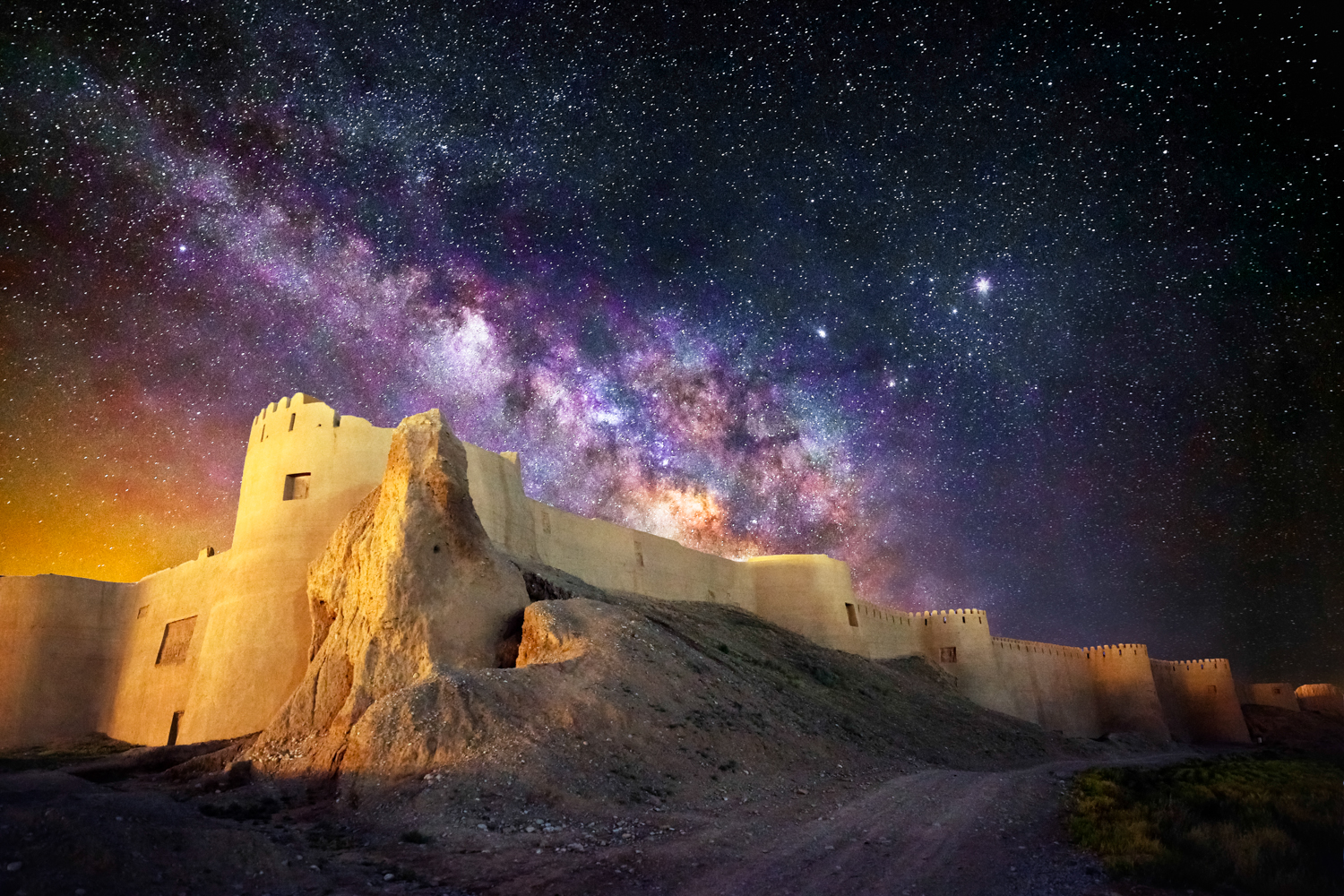
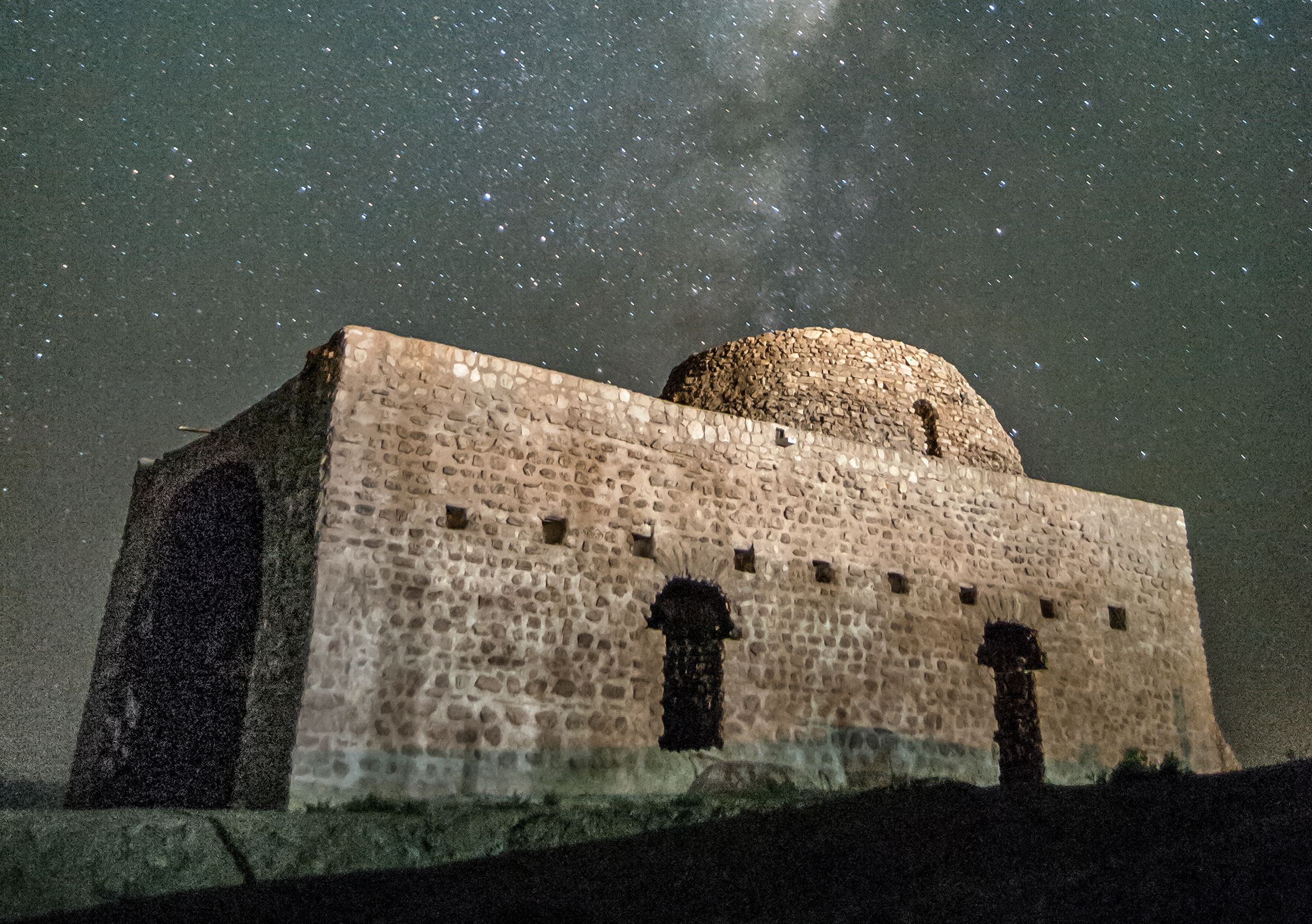
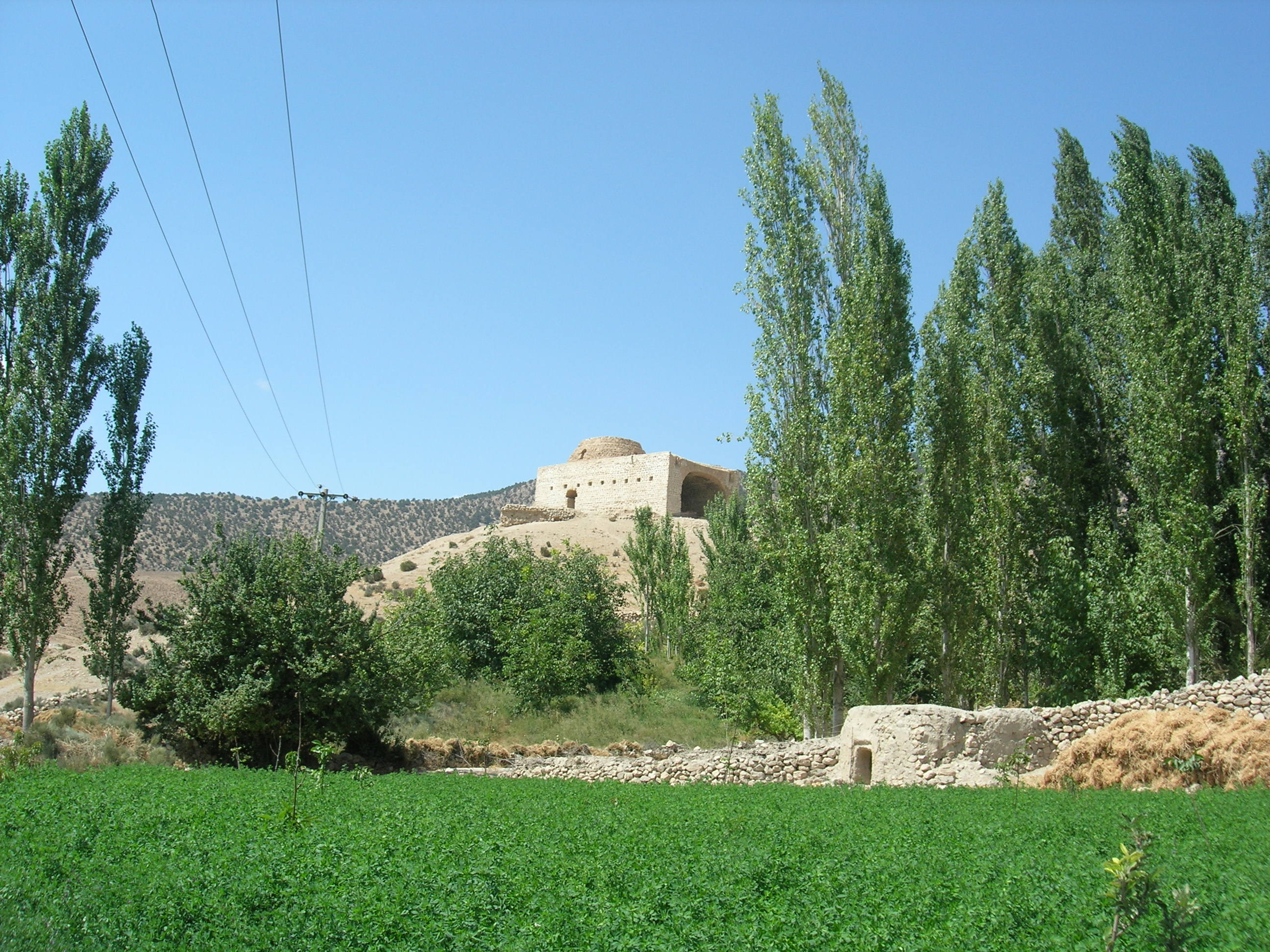

- Location of North Khorasan province within Iran
- Coordinates: 37°22′N 57°16′E
- Country: Iran
- Region: Region 5
- Established: 2004
- Capital: Bojnord
- Counties: 10

Government
  - Governor-general: Bahman Nouri (Independent)

Area
  - Total: 28,434 km^{2} (10,978 sq mi)

Population (2016)
  - Total: 863,092
  - Density: 30.354/km^{2} (78.617/sq mi)
- Time zone: UTC+03:30 (IRST)
- Area code: 58
- Main languages: Persian; Kurdish; Turkmen; Khorasani Turkic
- HDI (2017): 0.745 high · 29th

North Khorasan province (Persian: استان خراسان شمالی) (Note: Also romanized as Ostān-e Xorāsān-e Šomāli) is one of the 31 provinces of Iran, located in the northeast of the country. Its capital is the city of Bojnord.

North Khorasan is one of the three provinces created after the division of Khorasan in 2004. Khorasan was the largest province of Iran until it was divided into three provinces on 29 September 2004. The provinces approved by the parliament of Iran (on 18 May 2004) and the Council of Guardians (on 29 May 2004) were Razavi Khorasan, North Khorasan, and South Khorasan. In 2014, it was placed in Region 5.

== History ==
Greater Khorasan has witnessed the rise and fall of many dynasties and governments in its territory throughout history. Various tribes of Persians, Arabs, Turks, Kurds and Turkmens have brought change to the region time and time again.

Ancient geographers of Iran divided Iran into eight segments, of which the largest was the territory of Greater Khorasan. Esfarayen, among other cities of the province, was one of the focal points for settlement by Aryan tribes entering Iran.

The Parthian empire was based near Merv in Khorasan for many years. In Parthian times, Esfarayen was one of the important villages of Nishapur.

During the Sasanian era, the province was governed by a Spahbod (Lieutenant General) called "Padgoosban" and four margraves, each commander of one of the four parts of the province.

In the year 651, the army of Islamic Arabs invaded Khorasan. The territory remained in the hands of the Abbasid clan until 820, followed by the rule of the Iranian Taherid clan in the year 896 and the Samanid dynasty in 900. Khorasan was divided into four parts during the Muslim conquest of Persia, each section being named after the four largest cities; Nishapur, Merv, Herat, and Balkh.

Mahmud of Ghazni conquered Khorasan in 994 and in the year 1037 Tuğrul Beg, the first of the Seljuq empire rulers, conquered Nishapur.

Mahmud Qaznavi retaliated against the invaders several times, and finally, the Qaznavi Turks defeated Sultan Sanjar. But there was more to come, as in 1157 Khorasan was conquered by the Khwarazmids. In 1220 was annexed by the Mongols of Genghis Khan. When in 1226 the great conqueror finally died, Khorasan was inherited by his son Tolui and then by Tolui's son Hulegu, the first emperor of the Mongolic Ilkhanate of Persia.

In the 14th century, a flag of independence was hoisted by the Sarbedaran movement in Sabzevar, and in 1368, Khorasan came into the hands of Tamerlane.

In 1507, Khorasan was occupied by Uzbek tribes. After the death of Nader Shah in 1747, it was occupied by the Afghans.

In 1824, Herat became independent for several years when the Afghan Empire was split between the Durranis and Barakzais. The Persians sieged the city in 1837, but the British assisted the Afghans in repelling them. In 1856, the Persians launched another invasion, and briefly managed to recapture the city; it led directly to the Anglo-Persian War. In 1857 hostilities between the Persians and the British ended after the Treaty of Paris was signed, and the Persian troops withdrew from Herat. Afghanistan reconquered Herat in 1863 under Dost Muhammad Khan, two weeks before his death.

== Demographics ==
=== Language and ethnicity ===
North Khorasan province is one of the most diverse territories in Iran today, largely reflecting the ethnic make-up of Iran. Most people in North Khorasan are Shia Muslims, who are often Khorasani Kurds, Persians, Khorasani Turks and so on, although there is also a small minority of Sunnis who generally are Turkmen. There used to be a sizeable population of Lurs inhabiting this province, however, most returned to their native area in western Iran as there are no signs of them in the province today.

Previously, there was a sizable community of Arabs who settled in the area during the Arab invasion of Iran. However, by 1875 they had intermarried so extensively with Persians and Turks that they were indistinguishable, having largely abandoned the Arab language and culture in favour of the local one.

=== Population ===
At the time of the 2006 National Census, the province's population was 791,930 in 198,626 households. The following census in 2011 counted 867,727 people in 240,885 households. The 2016 census measured the population of the province as 863,092 in 254,747 households.

=== Administrative divisions ===

The population history and structural changes of North Khorasan province's administrative divisions over three consecutive censuses are shown in the following table.

North Khorasan Province
Counties	2006	2011	2016
Bam and Safiabad (Note: Separated from Esfarayen County after the 2016 census)	—	—	—
Bojnord	322,309	365,896	324,083
Esfarayen	119,152	127,012	120,513
Faruj	48,743	52,364	49,271
Garmeh (Note: Separated from Jajarm County after the 2006 census)	—	24,599	25,475
Jajarm	57,349	36,898	36,673
Maneh (Note: Separated from Maneh and Samalqan County after the 2016 census)	—	—	—
Raz and Jargalan (Note: Separated from Bojnord County after the 2011 census)	—	—	59,210
Samalqan (Note: Formerly Maneh and Samalqan County)	91,884	103,944	101,727
Shirvan	152,493	157,014	146,140
Total	791,930	867,727	863,092

=== Cities ===
According to the 2016 census, 484,346 people (over 56% of the population of North Khorasan province) live in the following cities:

City	Population
Ashkhaneh	25,104
Ava	3,993
Bojnord	228,931
Chenaranshahr	3,380
Daraq	4,926
Eivar	3,994
Esfarayen	59,490
Faruj	12,061
Garmeh	10,933
Hesar-e Garmkhan	1,499
Jajarm	19,580
Lujali	1,481
Pish Qaleh	2,001
Qazi	2,428
Qushkhaneh	996
Raz	5,029
Safiabad	3,427
Sankhvast	2,077
Shirvan	82,689
Shoqan	2,313
Titkanlu	3,835
Ziarat	4,179

== Attractions ==
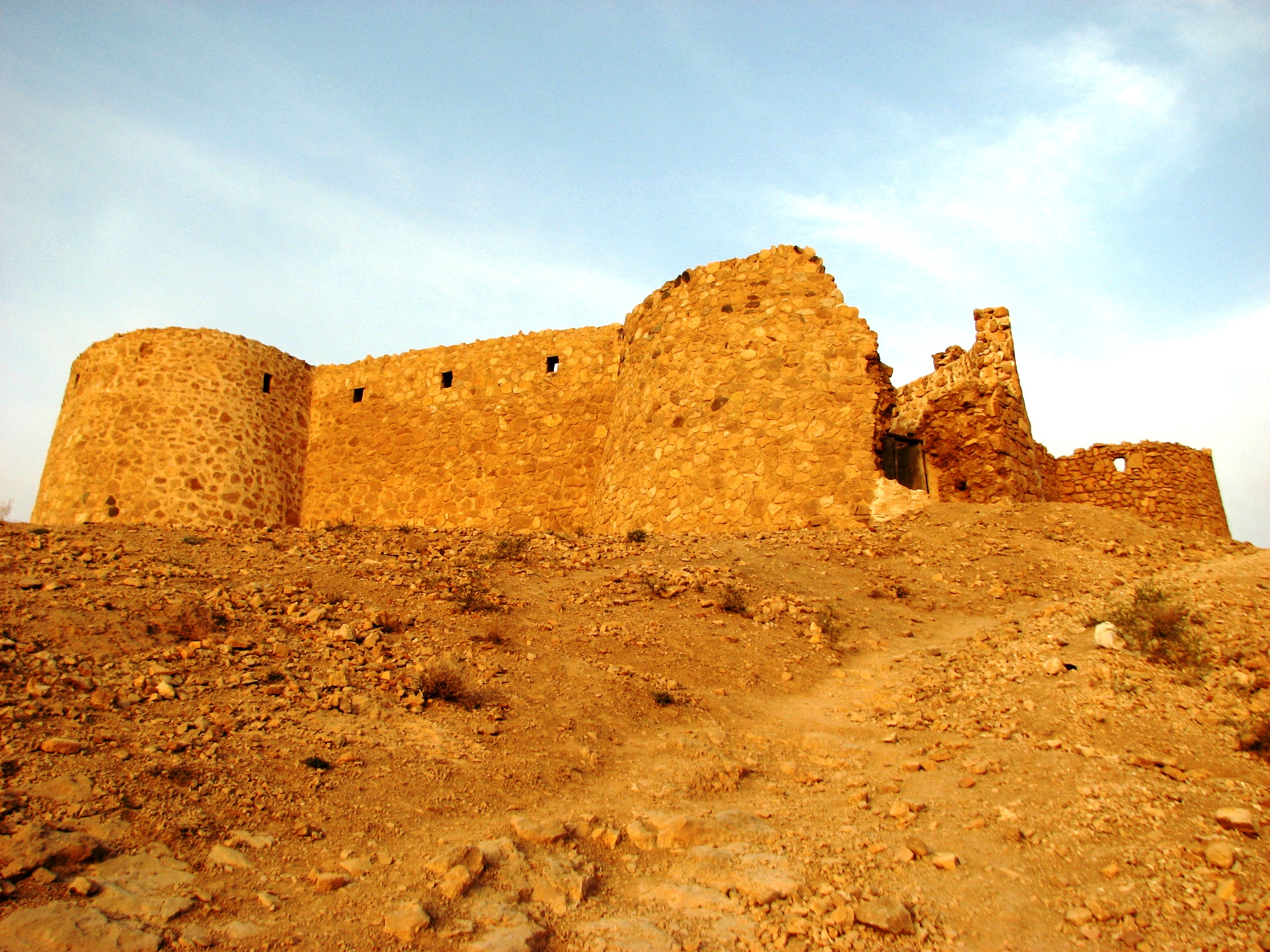
Jalalal-din castle in Jajarm

This province contains many historical and natural attractions, such as mineral water springs, small lakes, recreational areas, caves, and protected regions, and various hiking areas. Most of the historical relics are from the Qajar era, as earthquakes continue to ravage older relics.

The Cultural Heritage Organization of Iran lists 1,179 sites of historical and cultural significance in all three provinces of Khorasan.

Some of the popular attractions of North Khorasan are:

- Besh Qardash (five brothers) and Baba-Aman springs
- Jameh Mosque of Jajarm

== Colleges and universities ==
- University of Bojnurd
- Islamic Azad University of Bojnurd
- Eshragh Institute of Higher Education (Bojnurd, North Khorasan)
- Islamic Azad University of Shiravan
- Hakiman Institute of Higher Education (Bojnurd, North Khorasan)
- Khorasan University of Medical Science (Bojnurd, North Khorasan)

== Gallery ==
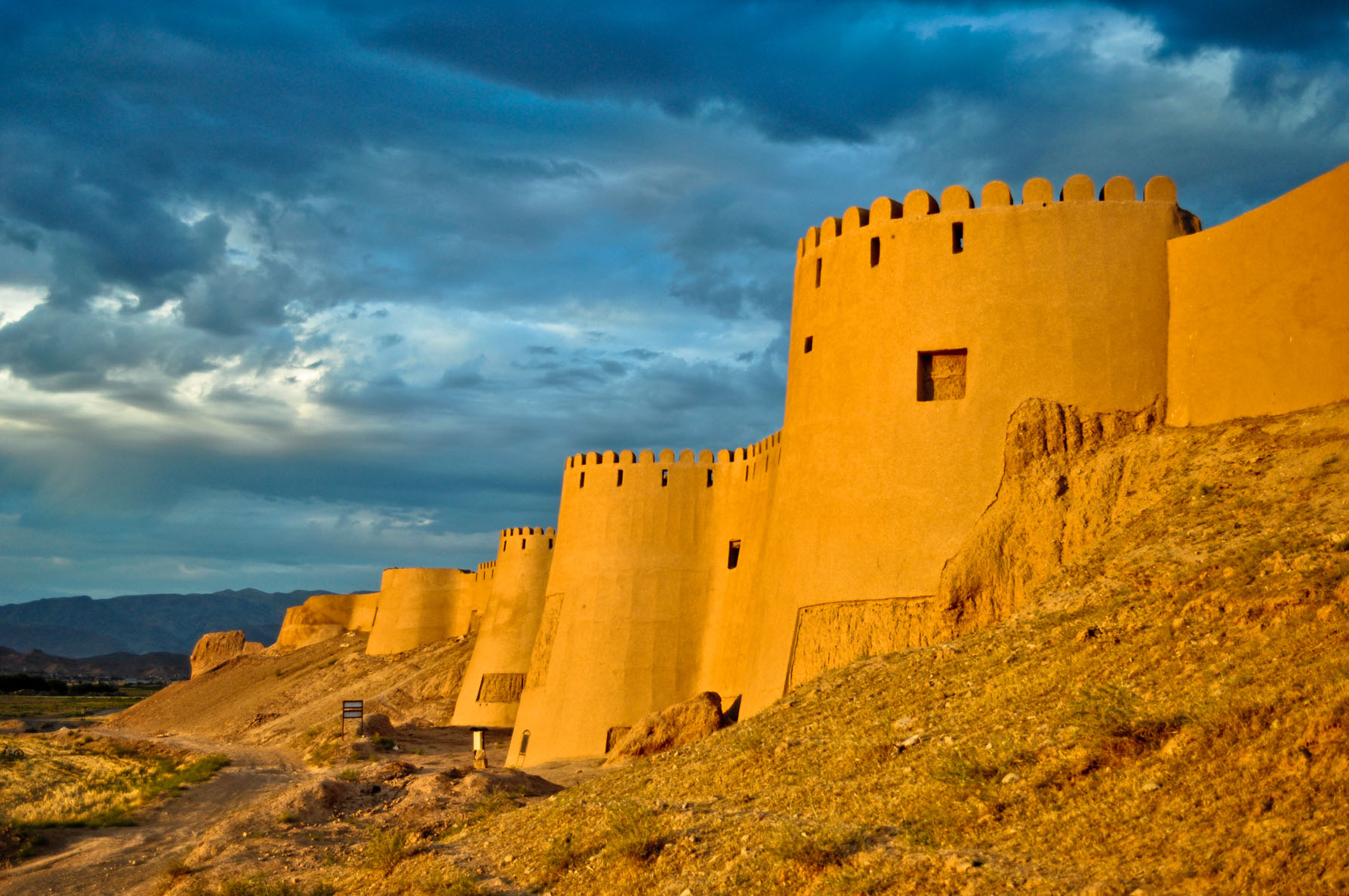
Esfarayen

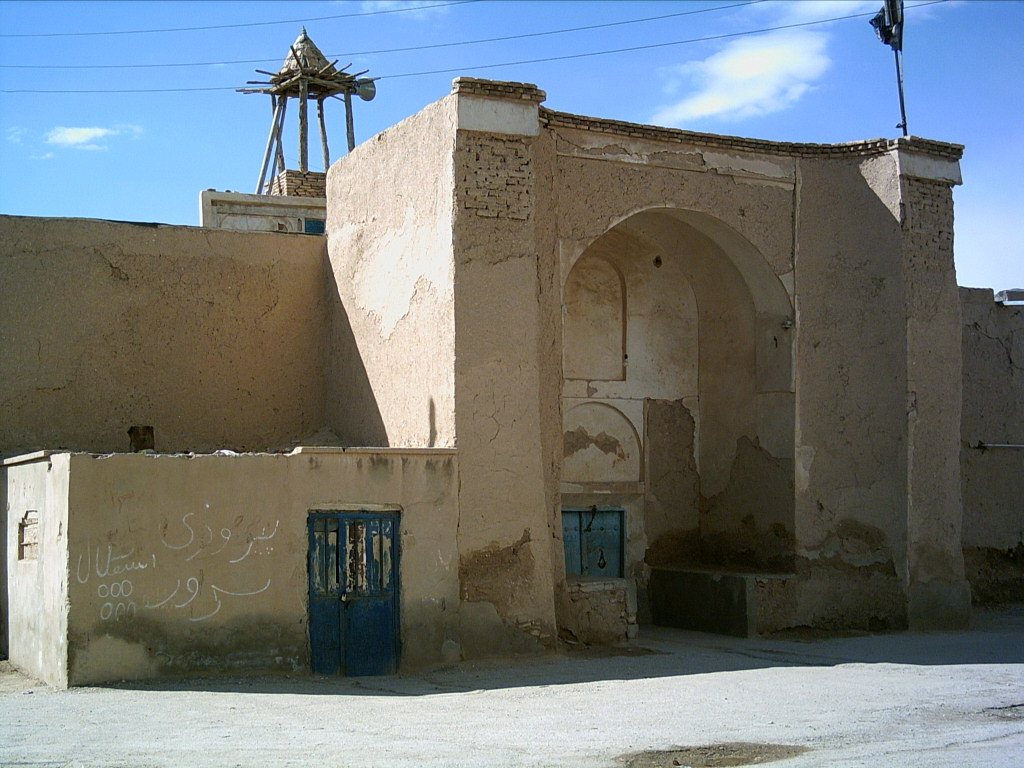
Jajarm

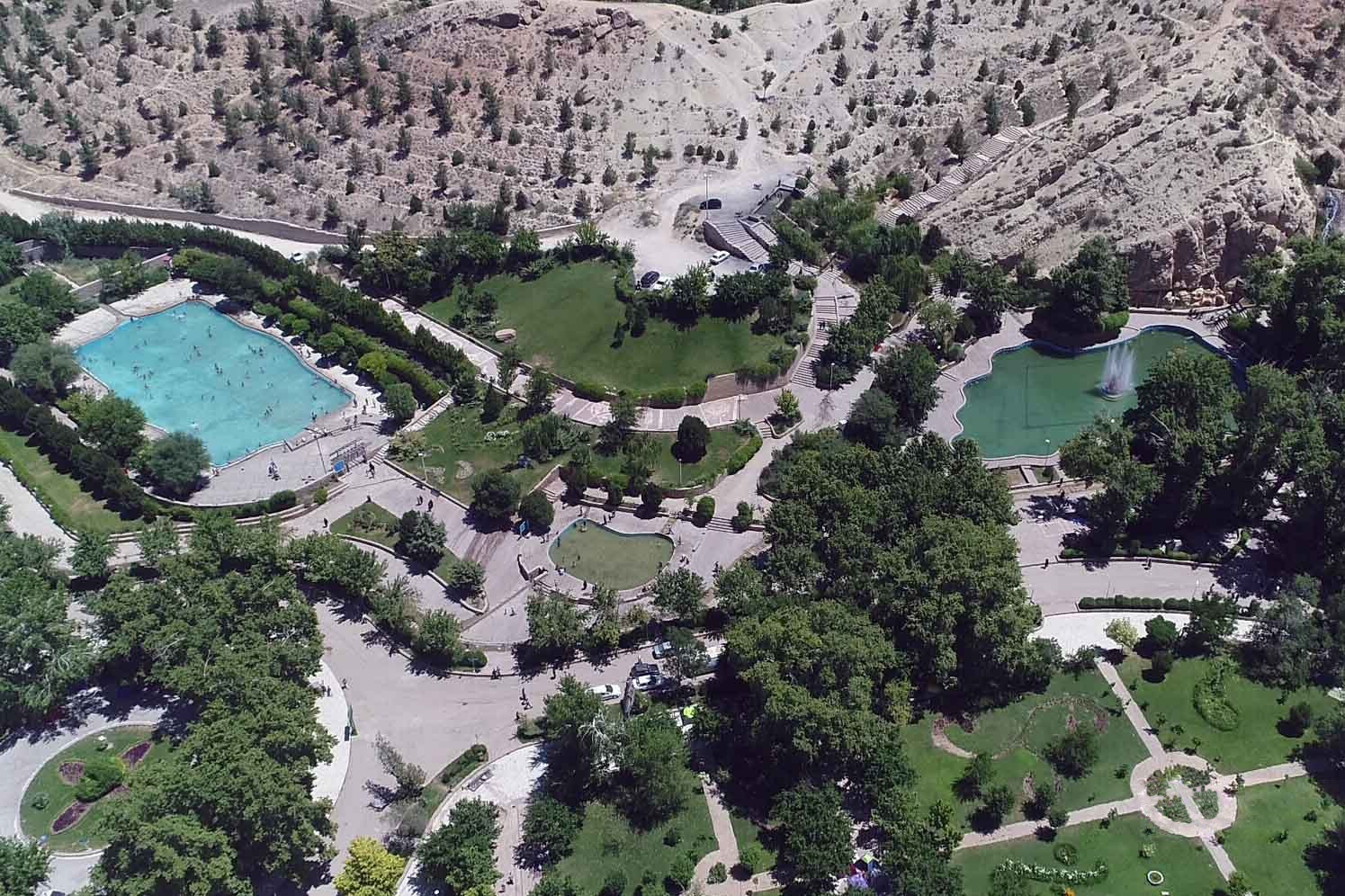
Bojnord

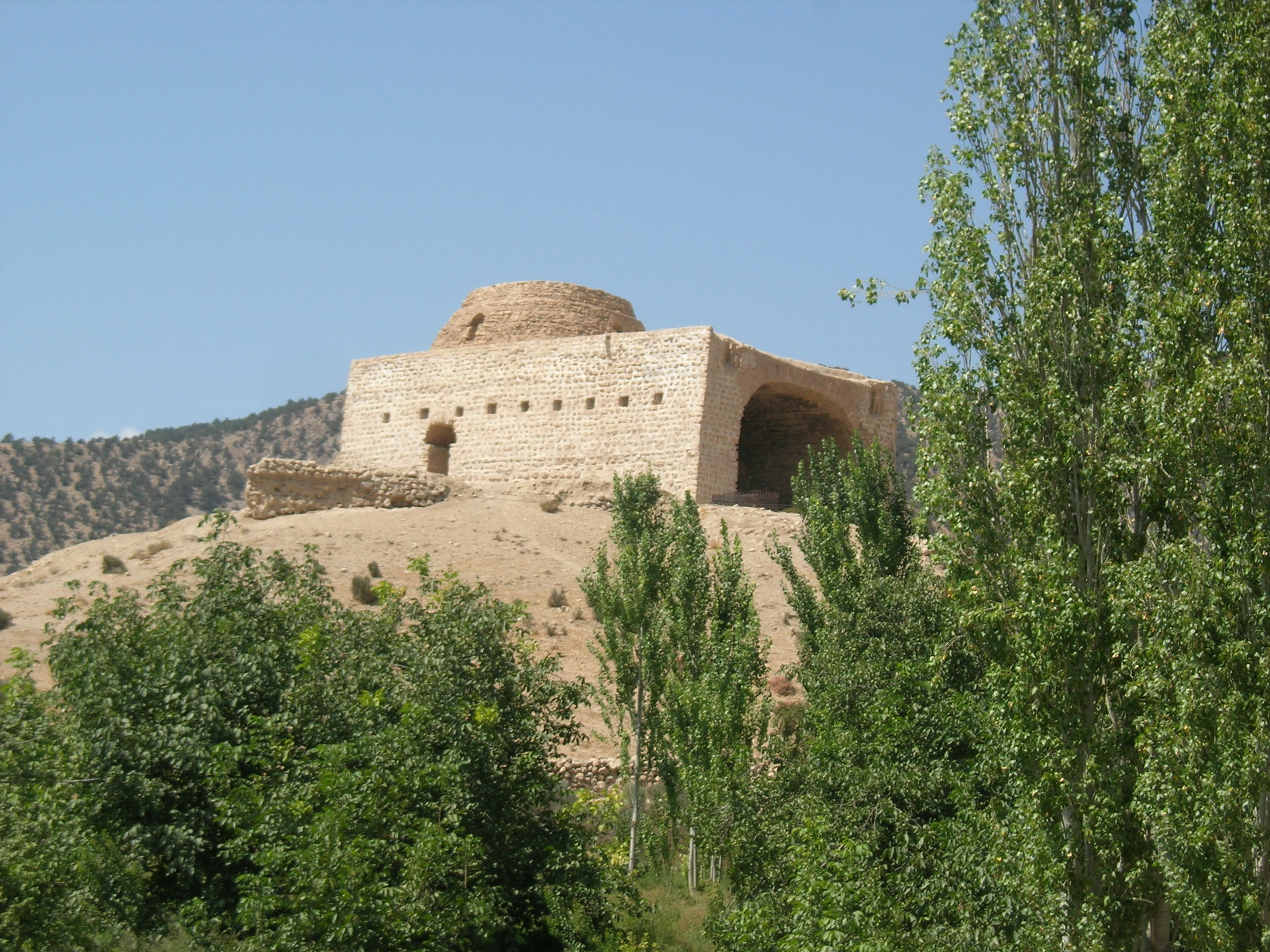
Bojnord

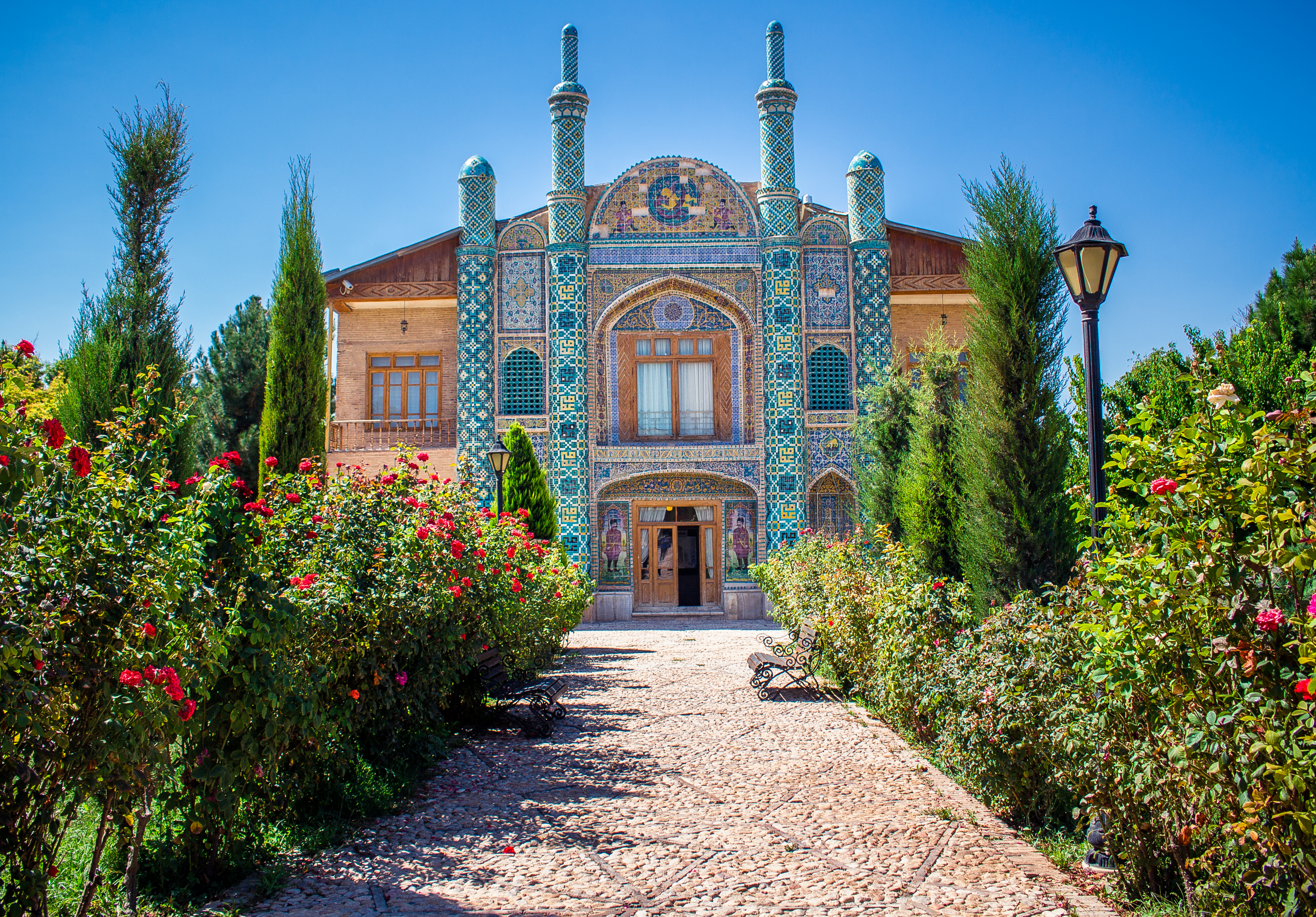
Bojnord

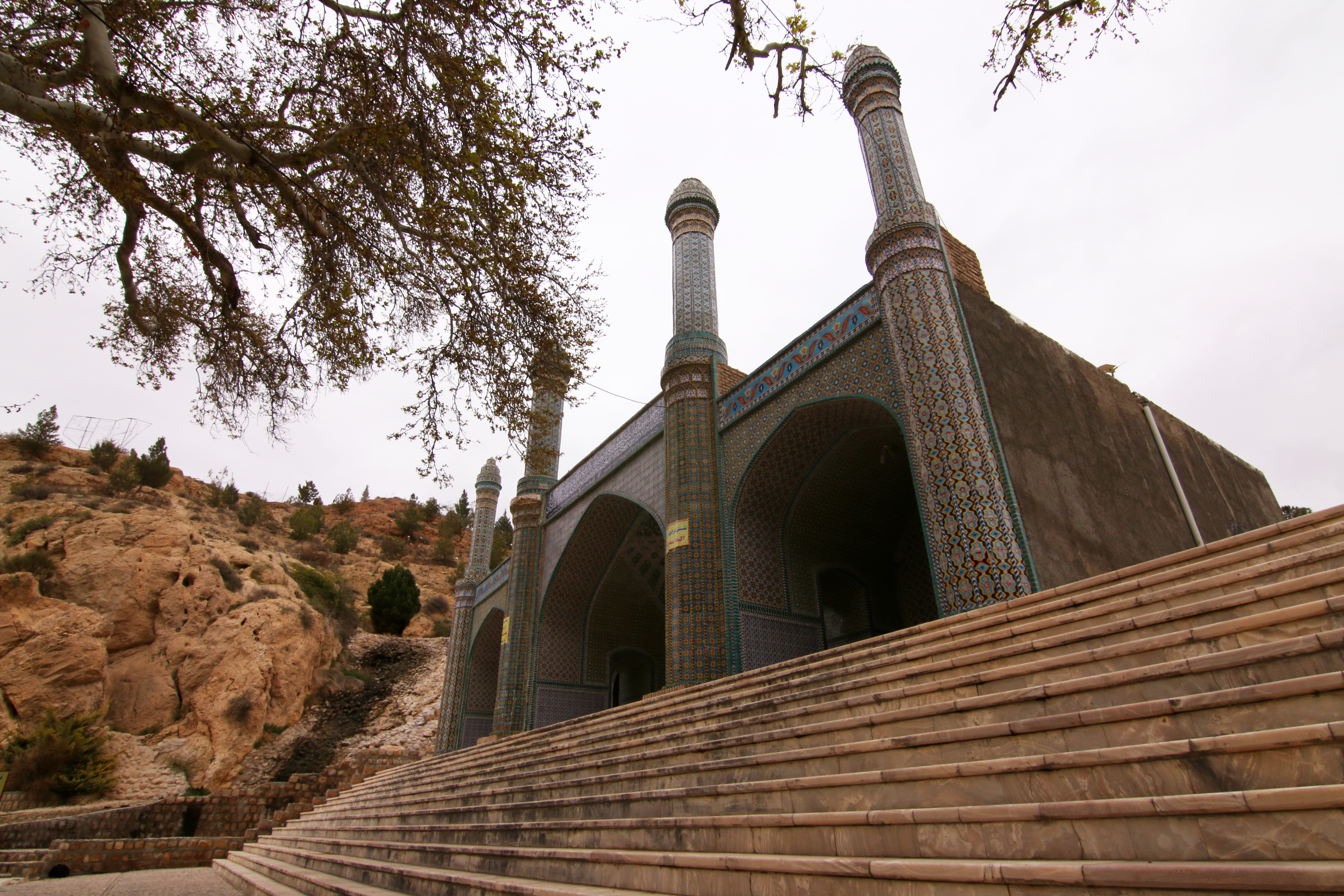
Bojnord

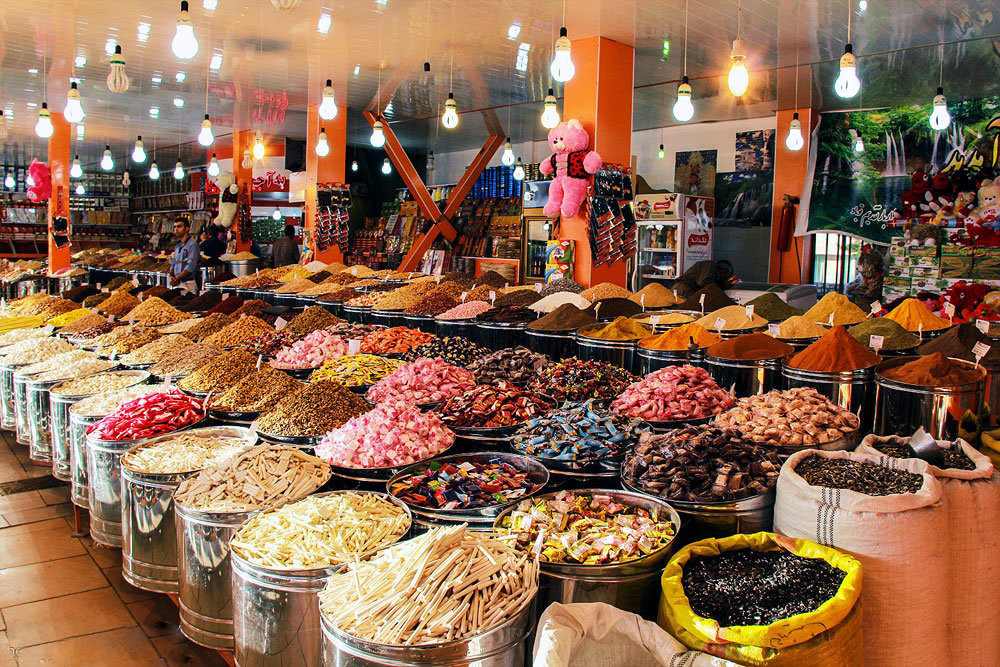
Faruj

== See also ==
- Khorasan
- Greater Khorasan
- Razavi Khorasan
- South Khorasan
- History of Iran
