= Dashtak =

Dashtak (Persian: دشتك) may refer to:

- Dashtak, Afghanistan
- Dashtak, Chaharmahal and Bakhtiari, Iran
- Dashtak, Kavar, Fars Province, Iran
- Dashtak, Marvdasht, Fars Province, Iran
- Dashtak, Gilan, Iran
- Dashtak, Pataveh, Dana County, Kohgiluyeh and Boyer-Ahmad Province, Iran
- Dashtak Dishmuk, Kohgiluyeh and Boyer-Ahmad Province, Iran
- Dashtak, Qazvin, Iran
- Dashtak, South Khorasan, Iran
- Dashtaki District, in West Azerbaijan Province, Iran
- Dashtak-e Olya (disambiguation), several places in Iran
- Dashtak-e Sofla (disambiguation), several places in Iran

== See also ==
- Dashtuk (disambiguation)
