= Post Darreh, North Khorasan =

Village in North Khorasan province, Iran

Post Darreh Persian: پست دره
- Village
- Location within Iran
- Country: Iran
- Province: North Khorasan
- County: Maneh
- District: Shirin Su
- Rural District: Kohneh Jolgeh

Population (2016)
  - Total: 93
- Time zone: UTC+3:30 (IRST)

Post Darreh (Persian: پست دره) (Note: Also romanized as Pasat Darreh) is a village in Kohneh Jolgeh Rural District of Shirin Su District in Maneh County, North Khorasan province, Iran.

== Demographics ==
=== Population ===
At the time of the 2006 National Census, the village's population was 111 in 23 households, when it was in Shirin Su Rural District of Maneh District (Note: Renamed the Central District of Maneh County) in Maneh and Samalqan County. (Note: Renamed Samalqan County) The following census in 2011 counted 150 people in 37 households. The 2016 census measured the population of the village as 93 people in 28 households.

In 2023, the district was separated from the county in the establishment of Maneh County and renamed the Central District. The rural district was transferred to the new Shirin Su District, and Post Darreh was transferred to Kohneh Jolgeh Rural District created in the same district.
