= Qezel Qaleh =

Qezel Qaleh or Qazel Qaleh (Persian: قزل قلعه) may refer to:

- Qezel Qaleh, East Azerbaijan
- Qezel Qaleh-ye Kuranlu, East Azerbaijan Province
- Qezel Qaleh-ye Musulanlu, East Azerbaijan Province
- Qezel Qaleh, Markazi
- Qezel Qaleh, Razavi Khorasan
- Qezel Qaleh-ye Bala, North Khorasan Province
- Qezel Qaleh-ye Pain, North Khorasan Province
