= Kariz, Maneh =

Village in North Khorasan province, Iran

Kariz Persian: كاريز
- Village
- Location within Iran
- Coordinates: 38°03′44″N 56°27′45″E
- Country: Iran
- Province: North Khorasan
- County: Maneh
- District: Shirin Su
- Rural District: Kohneh Jolgeh

Population (2016)
  - Total: 494
- Time zone: UTC+3:30 (IRST)

Kariz (Persian: كاريز) (Note: Also romanized as Kārīz) is a village in Kohneh Jolgeh Rural District of Shirin Su District in Maneh County, North Khorasan province, Iran.

== Demographics ==
=== Population ===
At the time of the 2006 National Census, the village's population was 376 in 83 households, when it was in Shirin Su Rural District of Maneh District (Note: Renamed the Central District of Maneh County) in Maneh and Samalqan County. (Note: Renamed Samalqan County) The following census in 2011 counted 398 people in 89 households. The 2016 census measured the population of the village as 494 people in 105 households.

In 2023, the district was separated from the county in the establishment of Maneh County and renamed the Central District. The rural district was transferred to the new Shirin Su District, and Kariz was transferred to Kohneh Jolgeh Rural District created in the same district.
