= Shesh Khaneh =

Village in North Khorasan province, Iran

Shesh Khaneh Persian: شش خانه
- Village
- Location within Iran
- Coordinates: 37°42′45″N 56°52′02″E
- Country: Iran
- Province: North Khorasan
- County: Maneh
- District: Central
- Rural District: Eshqabad

Population (2016)
  - Total: 183
- Time zone: UTC+3:30 (IRST)

Shesh Khaneh (Persian: شش خانه) (Note: Also romanized as Shesh Khāneh) is a village in Eshqabad Rural District of the Central District (Note: Formerly Maneh District of Maneh and Samalqan County) in Maneh County, North Khorasan province, Iran.

== Demographics ==
=== Population ===
At the time of the 2006 National Census, the village's population was 185 in 38 households, when it was in Atrak Rural District (Note: Formerly Maneh Rural District) of Maneh District (Note: Renamed the Central District of Maneh County) in Maneh and Samalqan County. (Note: Renamed Samalqan County) The following census in 2011 counted 149 people in 42 households. The 2016 census measured the population of the village as 183 people in 58 households.

In 2023, the district was separated from the county in the establishment of Maneh County and renamed the Central District. Shesh Khaneh was transferred to Eshqabad Rural District created in the same district.
