= Dashtak-e Olya, North Khorasan =

Village in North Khorasan province, Iran

Dashtak-e Olya Persian: دشتك عليا
- Village
- Location within Iran
- Coordinates: 37°45′04″N 56°34′55″E
- Country: Iran
- Province: North Khorasan
- County: Samalqan
- District: Central
- Rural District: Jeyransu

Population (2016)
  - Total: 1,658
- Time zone: UTC+3:30 (IRST)

Dashtak-e Olya (Persian: دشتك عليا) (Note: Also romanized as Dashtak-e ‘Olyā; also known as Dashtak-e Bālā) is a village in Jeyransu Rural District of the Central District in Samalqan County, (Note: Formerly Maneh and Samalqan County) North Khorasan province, Iran.

== Demographics ==
=== Population ===
At the time of the 2006 National Census, the village's population was 1,229 in 239 households, when it was in Atrak Rural District (Note: Formerly Maneh Rural District) of Maneh District. (Note: Renamed the Central District of Maneh County) The following census in 2011 counted 1,508 people in 326 households, by which time the village had been transferred to Jeyransu Rural District. The 2016 census measured the population of the village as 1,658 people in 361 households.
