= Qesti Moaven =

Village in North Khorasan province, Iran

Qesti Moaven Persian: قسطي معاون
- Village
- Location within Iran
- Coordinates: 37°41′57″N 56°49′33″E
- Country: Iran
- Province: North Khorasan
- County: Maneh
- District: Central
- Rural District: Eshqabad

Population (2016)
  - Total: 231
- Time zone: UTC+3:30 (IRST)

Qesti Moaven (Persian: قسطي معاون) (Note: Also romanized as Qesţī Mo‘āven) is a village in Eshqabad Rural District of the Central District (Note: Formerly Maneh District of Maneh and Samalqan County) in Maneh County, North Khorasan province, Iran.

== Demographics ==
=== Population ===
At the time of the 2006 National Census, the village's population was 269 in 58 households, when it was in Atrak Rural District (Note: Formerly Maneh Rural District) of Maneh District (Note: Renamed the Central District of Maneh County) in Maneh and Samalqan County. (Note: Renamed Samalqan County) The following census in 2011 counted 230 people in 56 households. The 2016 census measured the population of the village as 231 people in 64 households.

In 2023, the district was separated from the county in the establishment of Maneh County and renamed the Central District. Qesti Moaven was transferred to Eshqabad Rural District created in the same district.
