= Chaqan =

Village in North Khorasan province, Iran

Chaqan Persian: چاقان
- Village
- Location within Iran
- Country: Iran
- Province: North Khorasan
- County: Maneh
- District: Shirin Su
- Rural District: Shirin Su

Population (2016)
  - Total: 222
- Time zone: UTC+3:30 (IRST)

Chaqan (Persian: چاقان) (Note: Also romanized as Chāqān) is a village in Shirin Su Rural District of Shirin Su District in Maneh County, North Khorasan province, Iran.

== Demographics ==
=== Population ===
At the time of the 2006 National Census, the village's population was 161 in 36 households, when it was in Maneh District (Note: Renamed the Central District of Maneh County) of Maneh and Samalqan County. (Note: Renamed Samalqan County) The following census in 2011 counted 213 people in 47 households. The 2016 census measured the population of the village as 222 people in 46 households.

In 2023, the district was separated from the county in the establishment of Maneh County and renamed the Central District. The rural district was transferred to the new Shirin Su District.
