= Mohammad Avaz =

Village in North Khorasan province, Iran

Mohammad Avaz Persian: محمدعوض
- Village
- Location within Iran
- Coordinates: 37°52′45″N 56°46′55″E
- Country: Iran
- Province: North Khorasan
- County: Maneh
- District: Shirin Su
- Rural District: Shirin Su

Population (2016)
  - Total: 105
- Time zone: UTC+3:30 (IRST)

Mohammad Avaz (Persian: محمدعوض) (Note: Also romanized as Moḩammad ‘Avaẕ; also known as Moḩammadābād and Moḩammadābād-e ‘Avaẕ) is a village in Shirin Su Rural District of Shirin Su District in Maneh County, North Khorasan province, Iran.

== Demographics ==
=== Population ===
At the time of the 2006 National Census, the village's population was 77 in 13 households, when it was in Maneh District (Note: Renamed the Central District of Maneh County) of Maneh and Samalqan County. (Note: Renamed Samalqan County) The following census in 2011 counted 80 people in 21 households. The 2016 census measured the population of the village as 105 people in 24 households.

In 2023, the district was separated from the county in the establishment of Maneh County and renamed the Central District. The rural district was transferred to the new Shirin Su District.
