= Tarjali =

Village in North Khorasan province, Iran

Tarjali Persian: ترجلي
- Village
- Location within Iran
- Country: Iran
- Province: North Khorasan
- County: Maneh
- District: Shirin Su
- Rural District: Shirin Su

Population (2016)
  - Total: 50
- Time zone: UTC+3:30 (IRST)

Tarjali (Persian: ترجلي) (Note: Also romanized as Tarjalī) is a village in Shirin Su Rural District of Shirin Su District in Maneh County, North Khorasan province, Iran.

== Demographics ==
=== Population ===
At the time of the 2006 National Census, the village's population was 38 in nine households, when it was in Maneh District (Note: Renamed the Central District of Maneh County) of Maneh and Samalqan County. (Note: Renamed Samalqan County) The village did not appear in the following census of 2011. The 2016 census measured the population of the village as 50 people in 10 households.

In 2023, the district was separated from the county in the establishment of Maneh County and renamed the Central District. The rural district was transferred to the new Shirin Su District.
