= Kalateh-ye Chenar =

Village in North Khorasan province, Iran

Kalateh-ye Chenar Persian: كلاته چنار
- Village
- Location within Iran
- Coordinates: 37°49′05″N 57°00′31″E
- Country: Iran
- Province: North Khorasan
- County: Maneh
- District: Central
- Rural District: Eshqabad

Population (2016)
  - Total: 509
- Time zone: UTC+3:30 (IRST)

Kalateh-ye Chenar (Persian: كلاته چنار) (Note: Also romanized as Kalāteh Chenār and Kalāteh-ye Chenār; also known as Kalāt-e Chenār and Kalta Chenār) is a village in Eshqabad Rural District of the Central District (Note: Formerly Maneh District of Maneh and Samalqan County) in Maneh County, North Khorasan province, Iran.

== Demographics ==
=== Population ===
At the time of the 2006 National Census, the village's population was 537 in 123 households, when it was in Atrak Rural District (Note: Formerly Maneh Rural District) of Maneh District (Note: Renamed the Central District of Maneh County) in Maneh and Samalqan County. (Note: Renamed Samalqan County) The following census in 2011 counted 499 people in 125 households. The 2016 census measured the population of the village as 509 people in 143 households.

In 2023, the district was separated from the county in the establishment of Maneh County and renamed the Central District. Kalateh-ye Chenar was transferred to Eshqabad Rural District created in the same district.
