= Qaleh Bid, North Khorasan =

Village in North Khorasan province, Iran

Qaleh Bid Persian: قلعه بيد
- Village
- Location within Iran
- Coordinates: 37°41′40″N 56°50′45″E
- Country: Iran
- Province: North Khorasan
- County: Maneh
- District: Central
- Rural District: Eshqabad

Population (2016)
  - Total: 160
- Time zone: UTC+3:30 (IRST)

Qaleh Bid (Persian: قلعه بيد) (Note: Also romanized as Qal‘eh Bīd) is a village in Eshqabad Rural District of the Central District (Note: Formerly Maneh District of Maneh and Samalqan County) in Maneh County, North Khorasan province, Iran.

== Demographics ==
=== Population ===
At the time of the 2006 National Census, the village's population was 144 in 32 households, when it was in Atrak Rural District (Note: Formerly Maneh Rural District) of Maneh District (Note: Renamed the Central District of Maneh County) in Maneh and Samalqan County. (Note: Renamed Samalqan County) The following census in 2011 counted 126 people in 33 households. The 2016 census measured the population of the village as 160 people in 50 households.

In 2023, the district was separated from the county in the establishment of Maneh County and renamed the Central District. Qaleh Bid was transferred to Eshqabad Rural District created in the same district.
