= Kushki Torkaman =

Village in North Khorasan province, Iran

Kushki Torkaman Persian: كوشكي تركمن
- Village
- Location within Iran
- Coordinates: 37°42′44″N 56°42′47″E
- Country: Iran
- Province: North Khorasan
- County: Maneh
- District: Central
- Rural District: Eshqabad

Population (2016)
  - Total: 824
- Time zone: UTC+3:30 (IRST)

Kushki Torkaman (Persian: كوشكي تركمن) (Note: Also romanized as Kūshkī Torkaman) is a village in Eshqabad Rural District of the Central District (Note: Formerly Maneh District of Maneh and Samalqan County) in Maneh County, North Khorasan province, Iran.

== Demographics ==
=== Population ===
At the time of the 2006 National Census, the village's population was 846 in 193 households, when it was in Atrak Rural District (Note: Formerly Maneh Rural District) of Maneh District (Note: Renamed the Central District of Maneh County) in Maneh and Samalqan County. (Note: Renamed Samalqan County) The following census in 2011 counted 938 people in 243 households. The 2016 census measured the population of the village as 824 people in 218 households.

In 2023, the district was separated from the county in the establishment of Maneh County and renamed the Central District. Kushki Torkaman was transferred to Eshqabad Rural District created in the same district.
