= Agh Mazar =

Village in North Khorasan province, Iran

Agh Mazar Persian: اغمزار
- Village
- Location within Iran
- Coordinates: 37°41′35″N 56°55′10″E
- Country: Iran
- Province: North Khorasan
- County: Maneh
- District: Central
- Rural District: Eshqabad

Population (2016)
  - Total: 414
- Time zone: UTC+3:30 (IRST)

Agh Mazar (Persian: اغمزار) (Note: Also romanized as Āgh Mazār) is a village in Eshqabad Rural District of the Central District (Note: Formerly Maneh District of Maneh and Samalqan County) in Maneh County, North Khorasan province, Iran.

== Demographics ==
=== Population ===
At the time of the 2006 National Census, the village's population was 537 in 115 households, when it was in Atrak Rural District (Note: Formerly Maneh Rural District) of Maneh District (Note: Renamed the Central District of Maneh County) in Maneh and Samalqan County. (Note: Renamed Samalqan County) The following census in 2011 counted 528 people in 140 households. The 2016 census measured the population of the village as 414 people in 122 households.

In 2023, the district was separated from the county in the establishment of Maneh County and renamed the Central District. Agh Mazar was transferred to Eshqabad Rural District created in the same district.
