= Qarah Aqaj-e Bala =

Village in North Khorasan province, Iran

Qarah Aqaj-e Bala Persian: قره اقاج بالا
- Village
- Location within Iran
- Coordinates: 37°39′38″N 56°49′36″E
- Country: Iran
- Province: North Khorasan
- County: Maneh
- District: Central
- Rural District: Eshqabad

Population (2016)
  - Total: 19
- Time zone: UTC+3:30 (IRST)

Qarah Aqaj-e Bala (Persian: قره اقاج بالا) (Note: Also romanized as Qarah Āqāj-e Bālā; also known as Qarah Āghāj-e Bālā) is a village in Eshqabad Rural District of the Central District (Note: Formerly Maneh District of Maneh and Samalqan County) in Maneh County, North Khorasan province, Iran.

== Demographics ==
=== Population ===
At the time of the 2006 National Census, the village's population was 38 in seven households, when it was in Atrak Rural District (Note: Formerly Maneh Rural District) of Maneh District (Note: Renamed the Central District of Maneh County) in Maneh and Samalqan County. (Note: Renamed Samalqan County) The following census in 2011 counted 85 people in 23 households. The 2016 census measured the population of the village as 19 people in six households.

In 2023, the district was separated from the county in the establishment of Maneh County and renamed the Central District. Qarah Aqaj-e Bala was transferred to Eshqabad Rural District created in the same district.
