= Kushki Raji =

Village in North Khorasan province, Iran

Kushki Raji Persian: كوشكي راجي
- Village
- Location within Iran
- Coordinates: 37°42′06″N 56°43′02″E
- Country: Iran
- Province: North Khorasan
- County: Maneh
- District: Central
- Rural District: Eshqabad

Population (2016)
  - Total: 200
- Time zone: UTC+3:30 (IRST)

Kushki Raji (Persian: كوشكي راجي) (Note: Also romanized as Kūshkī Rājī) is a village in Eshqabad Rural District of the Central District (Note: Formerly Maneh District of Maneh and Samalqan County) in Maneh County, North Khorasan province, Iran.

== Demographics ==
=== Population ===
At the time of the 2006 National Census, the village's population was 232 in 63 households, when it was in Atrak Rural District (Note: Formerly Maneh Rural District) of Maneh District (Note: Renamed the Central District of Maneh County) in Maneh and Samalqan County. (Note: Renamed Samalqan County) The following census in 2011 counted 239 people in 68 households. The 2016 census measured the population of the village as 200 people in 58 households.

In 2023, the district was separated from the county in the establishment of Maneh County and renamed the Central District. Kushki Raji was transferred to Eshqabad Rural District created in the same district.
