= Kohneh Jolgeh =

Village in North Khorasan province, Iran

Kohneh Jolgeh Persian: كهنه جلگه
- Village
- Location within Iran
- Coordinates: 38°04′13″N 56°29′12″E
- Country: Iran
- Province: North Khorasan
- County: Maneh
- District: Shirin Su
- Rural District: Kohneh Jolgeh

Population (2016)
  - Total: 2,010
- Time zone: UTC+3:30 (IRST)

Kohneh Jolgeh (Persian: كهنه جلگه) is a village in, and the capital of, Kohneh Jolgeh Rural District in Shirin Su District of Maneh County, North Khorasan province, Iran.

== Demographics ==
=== Population ===
At the time of the 2006 National Census, the village's population was 1,422 in 319 households, when it was in Shirin Su Rural District of Maneh District (Note: Renamed the Central District of Maneh County) in Maneh and Samalqan County. (Note: Renamed Samalqan County) The following census in 2011 counted 1,889 people in 421 households. The 2016 census measured the population of the village as 2,010 people in 467 households, the most populous in its rural district.

In 2023, the district was separated from the county in the establishment of Maneh County and renamed the Central District. The rural district was transferred to the new Shirin Su District, and Kohneh Jolgeh was transferred to Kohneh Jolgeh Rural District created in the same district.
