= Kushki Kikanlu =

Village in North Khorasan province, Iran

Kushki Kikanlu Persian: كوشكي كيكانلو
- Village
- Location within Iran
- Coordinates: 37°40′09″N 57°00′06″E
- Country: Iran
- Province: North Khorasan
- County: Maneh
- District: Central
- Rural District: Eshqabad

Population (2016)
  - Total: 282
- Time zone: UTC+3:30 (IRST)

Kushki Kikanlu (Persian: كوشكي كيكانلو) (Note: Also romanized as Kūshkī Kīkānlū; also known as Kūshkī Līkānlū) is a village in Eshqabad Rural District of the Central District (Note: Formerly Maneh District of Maneh and Samalqan County) in Maneh County, North Khorasan province, Iran.

== Demographics ==
=== Population ===
At the time of the 2006 National Census, the village's population was 256 in 79 households, when it was in Atrak Rural District (Note: Formerly Maneh Rural District) of Maneh District (Note: Renamed the Central District of Maneh County) in Maneh and Samalqan County. (Note: Renamed Samalqan County) The following census in 2011 counted 285 people in 96 households. The 2016 census measured the population of the village as 282 people in 92 households.

In 2023, the district was separated from the county in the establishment of Maneh County and renamed the Central District. Kushki Kikanlu was transferred to Eshqabad Rural District created in the same district.
