= Qarah Aqaj-e Pain =

Village in North Khorasan province, Iran

Qarah Aqaj-e Pain Persian: قره اقاج پائين
- Village
- Location within Iran
- Coordinates: 37°42′09″N 56°48′26″E
- Country: Iran
- Province: North Khorasan
- County: Maneh
- District: Central
- Rural District: Eshqabad

Population (2016)
  - Total: 101
- Time zone: UTC+3:30 (IRST)

Qarah Aqaj-e Pain (Persian: قره اقاج پائين) (Note: Also romanized as Qarah Āqāj-e Pā’īn; also known as Qarah Āghāj-e Pā’īn) is a village in Eshqabad Rural District of the Central District (Note: Formerly Maneh District of Maneh and Samalqan County) in Maneh County, North Khorasan province, Iran.

== Demographics ==
=== Population ===
At the time of the 2006 National Census, the village's population was 91 in 23 households, when it was in Atrak Rural District (Note: Formerly Maneh Rural District) of Maneh District (Note: Renamed the Central District of Maneh County) in Maneh and Samalqan County. (Note: Renamed Samalqan County) The following census in 2011 counted 84 people in 26 households. The 2016 census measured the population of the village as 101 people in 26 households.

In 2023, the district was separated from the county in the establishment of Maneh County and renamed the Central District. Qarah Aqaj-e Pain was transferred to Eshqabad Rural District created in the same district.
