= Borj-e Zanganlu =

Village in North Khorasan province, Iran

Borj-e Zanganlu Persian: برج زنگانلو
- Village
- Location within Iran
- Coordinates: 37°37′15″N 57°00′04″E
- Country: Iran
- Province: North Khorasan
- County: Maneh
- District: Central
- Rural District: Eshqabad

Population (2016)
  - Total: 402
- Time zone: UTC+3:30 (IRST)

Borj-e Zanganlu (Persian: برج زنگانلو) (Note: Also romanized as Borj Zangalanlū and Borj-e Zangānlū; also known as Borj, Borj-e Zangālī, and Burj Zanganali) is a village in Eshqabad Rural District of the Central District (Note: Formerly Maneh District of Maneh and Samalqan County) in Maneh County, North Khorasan province, Iran.

== Demographics ==
=== Population ===
At the time of the 2006 National Census, the village's population was 328 in 90 households, when it was in Atrak Rural District (Note: Formerly Maneh Rural District) of Maneh District (Note: Renamed the Central District of Maneh County) in Maneh and Samalqan County. (Note: Renamed Samalqan County) The following census in 2011 counted 393 people in 112 households. The 2016 census measured the population of the village as 402 people in 128 households.

In 2023, the district was separated from the county in the establishment of Maneh County and renamed the Central District. Borj-e Zanganlu was transferred to Eshqabad Rural District created in the same district.
