= Kalateh-ye Bashim =

Village in North Khorasan province, Iran

Kalateh-ye Bashim Persian: كلاته بشيم
- Village
- Location within Iran
- Country: Iran
- Province: North Khorasan
- County: Maneh
- District: Central
- Rural District: Eshqabad

Population (2016)
  - Total: 17
- Time zone: UTC+3:30 (IRST)

Kalateh-ye Bashim (Persian: كلاته بشيم) (Note: Also romanized as Kalāteh-ye Bashīm) is a village in Eshqabad Rural District of the Central District (Note: Formerly Maneh District of Maneh and Samalqan County) in Maneh County, North Khorasan province, Iran.

== Demographics ==
=== Population ===
At the time of the 2006 National Census, the village's population was 24 in four households, when it was in Atrak Rural District (Note: Formerly Maneh Rural District) of Maneh District (Note: Renamed the Central District of Maneh County) in Maneh and Samalqan County. (Note: Renamed Samalqan County) The following census in 2011 counted 27 people in five households. The 2016 census measured the population of the village as 17 people in four households.

In 2023, the district was separated from the county in the establishment of Maneh County and renamed the Central District. Kalateh-ye Bashim was transferred to Eshqabad Rural District created in the same district.
