= Chahal Gazer =

Village in North Khorasan province, Iran

Chahal Gazer Persian: چهل گذر
- Village
- Location within Iran
- Country: Iran
- Province: North Khorasan
- County: Maneh
- District: Shirin Su
- Rural District: Shirin Su

Population (2016)
  - Total: 105
- Time zone: UTC+3:30 (IRST)

Chahal Gazer (Persian: چهل گذر) (Note: Also romanized as Chahal Gaẕer) is a village in Shirin Su Rural District of Shirin Su District in Maneh County, North Khorasan province, Iran.

== Demographics ==
=== Population ===
At the time of the 2006 National Census, the village's population was 91 in 22 households, when it was in Maneh District (Note: Renamed the Central District of Maneh County) of Maneh and Samalqan County. (Note: Renamed Samalqan County) The following census in 2011 counted 81 people in 22 households. The 2016 census measured the population of the village as 99 people in 26 households.

In 2023, the district was separated from the county in the establishment of Maneh County and renamed the Central District. The rural district was transferred to the new Shirin Su District.
