= Kalimani =

Village in North Khorasan province, Iran

Kalimani Persian: کالیمانی
- Village
- Location within Iran
- Coordinates: 37°52′03″N 56°48′06″E
- Country: Iran
- Province: North Khorasan
- County: Maneh
- District: Shirin Su
- Rural District: Shirin Su
- Time zone: UTC+3:30 (IRST)

Kalimani (Persian: کالیمانی) (Note: Also romanized as Kālīmanī; formerly known as Shahrak-e Kal Imani (شهرک کال ایمانی)) is a village in, and the capital of, Shirin Su Rural District in Shirin Su District of Maneh County, North Khorasan province, Iran. The previous capital of the rural district was the village of Khartut.

== History ==
In 2023, Maneh District (Note: Renamed the Central District of Maneh County) was separated from Maneh and Samalqan County (Note: Renamed Samalqan County) in the establishment of Maneh County and renamed the Central District. Shirin Su Rural District was transferred to the new Shirin Su District.

== Overview ==
A collection of several villages 150 km west of Bojnord, the capital of North Khorasan province, Shahrak-e Kal Imani has been struggling with many problems, from mobile antennas to water shortages and historical deprivations. People in diverse villages of the region, in addition to lack of water and suitable facilities for life, did not benefit from the wheat harvest in 2020 due to drought at the time, which had also had a great impact on the income of families in the region surrounding the village.
