= Yomuq =

Village in North Khorasan province, Iran

Yomuq Persian: يموق
- Village
- Location within Iran
- Coordinates: 37°59′46″N 56°28′47″E
- Country: Iran
- Province: North Khorasan
- County: Maneh
- District: Shirin Su
- Rural District: Shirin Su

Population (2016)
  - Total: 623
- Time zone: UTC+3:30 (IRST)

Yomuq (Persian: يموق) (Note: Also romanized as Yomūq) is a village in Shirin Su Rural District of Shirin Su District in Maneh County, North Khorasan province, Iran.

== Demographics ==
=== Population ===
At the time of the 2006 National Census, the village's population was 512 in 110 households, when it was in Maneh District (Note: Renamed the Central District of Maneh County) of Maneh and Samalqan County. (Note: Renamed Samalqan County) The following census in 2011 counted 566 people in 134 households. The 2016 census measured the population of the village as 623 people in 148 households.

In 2023, the district was separated from the county in the establishment of Maneh County and renamed the Central District. The rural district was transferred to the new Shirin Su District.
