= Shabli, North Khorasan =

Village in North Khorasan province, Iran

Shabli Persian: شبلي
- Village
- Location within Iran
- Coordinates: 38°05′46″N 56°23′39″E
- Country: Iran
- Province: North Khorasan
- County: Maneh
- District: Shirin Su
- Rural District: Kohneh Jolgeh

Population (2016)
  - Total: 213
- Time zone: UTC+3:30 (IRST)

Shabli (Persian: شبلي) (Note: Also romanized as Shablī) is a village in Kohneh Jolgeh Rural District of Shirin Su District in Maneh County, North Khorasan province, Iran.

== Demographics ==
=== Population ===
At the time of the 2006 National Census, the village's population was 288 in 69 households, when it was in Shirin Su Rural District of Maneh District (Note: Renamed the Central District of Maneh County) in Maneh and Samalqan County. (Note: Renamed Samalqan County) The following census in 2011 counted 261 people in 57 households. The 2016 census measured the population of the village as 213 people in 49 households.

In 2023, the district was separated from the county in the establishment of Maneh County and renamed the Central District. The rural district was transferred to the new Shirin Su District, and Shabli was transferred to Kohneh Jolgeh Rural District created in the same district.
