= Eshqabad, North Khorasan =

Village in North Khorasan province, Iran

Eshqabad Persian: عشق اباد
- Village
- Location within Iran
- Coordinates: 37°42′15″N 56°54′58″E
- Country: Iran
- Province: North Khorasan
- County: Maneh
- District: Central
- Rural District: Eshqabad

Population (2016)
  - Total: 678
- Time zone: UTC+3:30 (IRST)

Eshqabad (Persian: عشق اباد) (Note: Also romanized as ’Eshq Ābād and ‘Eshqābād) is a village in, and the capital of, Eshqabad Rural District in the Central District (Note: Formerly Maneh District of Maneh and Samalqan County) of Maneh County, North Khorasan province, Iran.

== Demographics ==
=== Population ===
At the time of the 2006 National Census, the village's population was 862 in 220 households, when it was in Atrak Rural District (Note: Formerly Maneh Rural District) of Maneh District (Note: Renamed the Central District of Maneh County) in Maneh and Samalqan County. (Note: Renamed Samalqan County) The following census in 2011 counted 863 people in 241 households. The 2016 census measured the population of the village as 678 people in 200 households.

In 2023, the district was separated from the county in the establishment of Maneh County and renamed the Central District. Eshqabad was transferred to Eshqabad Rural District created in the same district.
