= Qalandar Tappeh =

Village in North Khorasan province, Iran

Qalandar Tappeh Persian: قلندرتپه
- Village
- Location within Iran
- Coordinates: 37°39′33″N 57°01′09″E
- Country: Iran
- Province: North Khorasan
- County: Maneh
- District: Central
- Rural District: Atrak

Population (2016)
  - Total: 166
- Time zone: UTC+3:30 (IRST)

Qalandar Tappeh (Persian: قلندرتپه) is a village in Atrak Rural District (Note: Formerly Maneh Rural District) of the Central District (Note: Formerly Maneh District of Maneh and Samalqan County) in Maneh County, North Khorasan province, Iran.

== Demographics ==
=== Population ===
At the time of the 2006 National Census, the village's population was 231 in 56 households, when it was in Maneh District (Note: Renamed the Central District of Maneh County) of Maneh and Samalqan County. (Note: Renamed Samalqan County) The following census in 2011 counted 173 people in 51 households. The 2016 census measured the population of the village as 166 people in 51 households.

In 2023, the district was separated from the county in the establishment of Maneh County and renamed the Central District.
