= Qarah Chay, North Khorasan =

Village in North Khorasan province, Iran

Qarah Chay Persian: قره چاي
- Village
- Location within Iran
- Coordinates: 37°37′32″N 57°12′54″E
- Country: Iran
- Province: North Khorasan
- County: Maneh
- District: Central
- Rural District: Atrak

Population (2016)
  - Total: 194
- Time zone: UTC+3:30 (IRST)

Qarah Chay (Persian: قره چاي) (Note: Also romanized as Qarah Chāy and Qareh Chāy) is a village in Atrak Rural District (Note: Formerly Maneh Rural District) of the Central District (Note: Formerly Maneh District of Maneh and Samalqan County) in Maneh County, North Khorasan province, Iran.

== Demographics ==
=== Population ===
At the time of the 2006 National Census, the village's population was 179 in 43 households, when it was in Maneh District (Note: Renamed the Central District of Maneh County) of Maneh and Samalqan County. (Note: Renamed Samalqan County) The following census in 2011 counted 166 people in 48 households. The 2016 census measured the population of the village as 194 people in 60 households.

In 2023, the district was separated from the county in the establishment of Maneh County and renamed the Central District.
