= Khorramdeh-e Sharqi =

Village in North Khorasan province, Iran

Khorramdeh-e Sharqi Persian: خرم ده شرقي
- Village
- Location within Iran
- Coordinates: 37°42′33″N 56°47′27″E
- Country: Iran
- Province: North Khorasan
- County: Maneh
- District: Central
- Rural District: Eshqabad

Population (2016)
  - Total: 422
- Time zone: UTC+3:30 (IRST)

Khorramdeh-e Sharqi (Persian: خرم ده شرقي) (Note: Also romanized as Khorramdeh-e Sharqī; also known as Kharakī-ye Kord and Kharakī-ye Kordhā) is a village in Eshqabad Rural District of the Central District (Note: Formerly Maneh District of Maneh and Samalqan County) in Maneh County, North Khorasan province, Iran.

== Demographics ==
=== Population ===
At the time of the 2006 National Census, the village's population was 619 in 148 households, when it was in Atrak Rural District (Note: Formerly Maneh Rural District) of Maneh District (Note: Renamed the Central District of Maneh County) in Maneh and Samalqan County. (Note: Renamed Samalqan County) The following census in 2011 counted 417 people in 121 households. The 2016 census measured the population of the village as 422 people in 127 households.

In 2023, the district was separated from the county in the establishment of Maneh County and renamed the Central District. Khorramdeh-e Sharqi was transferred to Eshqabad Rural District created in the same district.
