= Yalanchi =

Village in North Khorasan province, Iran

Yalanchi Persian: يالانچي
- Village
- Location within Iran
- Coordinates: 37°44′45″N 57°09′29″E
- Country: Iran
- Province: North Khorasan
- County: Maneh
- District: Central
- Rural District: Atrak

Population (2016)
  - Total: 259
- Time zone: UTC+3:30 (IRST)

Yalanchi (Persian: يالانچي) (Note: Also romanized as Yālānchī; also known as Shīrīn Darreh and Yātānchī) is a village in Atrak Rural District (Note: Formerly Maneh Rural District) of the Central District (Note: Formerly Maneh District of Maneh and Samalqan County) in Maneh County, North Khorasan province, Iran.

== Demographics ==
=== Population ===
At the time of the 2006 National Census, the village's population was 212 in 57 households, when it was in Maneh District (Note: Renamed the Central District of Maneh County) of Maneh and Samalqan County. (Note: Renamed Samalqan County) The following census in 2011 counted 257 people in 67 households. The 2016 census measured the population of the village as 259 people in 85 households.

In 2023, the district was separated from the county in the establishment of Maneh County and renamed the Central District.
