= Rahim Dad =

Village in North Khorasan province, Iran

Rahim Dad Persian: رحيم داد
- Village
- Location within Iran
- Coordinates: 37°39′40″N 57°11′03″E
- Country: Iran
- Province: North Khorasan
- County: Maneh
- District: Central
- Rural District: Atrak

Population (2016)
  - Total: 201
- Time zone: UTC+3:30 (IRST)

Rahim Dad (Persian: رحيم داد) (Note: Also romanized as Raḩīm Dād) is a village in Atrak Rural District (Note: Formerly Maneh Rural District) of the Central District (Note: Formerly Maneh District of Maneh and Samalqan County) in Maneh County, North Khorasan province, Iran.

== Demographics ==
=== Population ===
At the time of the 2006 National Census, the village's population was 227 in 49 households, when it was in Maneh District (Note: Renamed the Central District of Maneh County) of Maneh and Samalqan County. (Note: Renamed Samalqan County) The following census in 2011 counted 185 people in 48 households. The 2016 census measured the population of the village as 201 people in 62 households.

In 2023, the district was separated from the county in the establishment of Maneh County and renamed the Central District.
