= Aliabad-e Qarah Chay =

Village in North Khorasan province, Iran

Aliabad-e Qarah Chay Persian: لي ابادقره چاي
- Village
- Location within Iran
- Coordinates: 37°38′12″N 57°13′48″E
- Country: Iran
- Province: North Khorasan
- County: Maneh
- District: Central
- Rural District: Atrak

Population (2016)
  - Total: 201
- Time zone: UTC+3:30 (IRST)

Aliabad-e Qarah Chay (Persian: علي ابادقره چاي) (Note: Also romanized as ‘Alīābād-e Qarah Chāy) is a village in Atrak Rural District (Note: Formerly Maneh Rural District) of the Central District (Note: Formerly Maneh District of Maneh and Samalqan County) in Maneh County, North Khorasan province, Iran.

== Demographics ==
=== Population ===
At the time of the 2006 National Census, the village's population was 55 in 16 households, when it was in Maneh District (Note: Renamed the Central District of Maneh County) of Maneh and Samalqan County. (Note: Renamed Samalqan County) The following census in 2011 counted 27 people in 11 households. The 2016 census measured the population of the village as zero.

In 2023, the district was separated from the county in the establishment of Maneh County and renamed the Central District.
