= Kikanlu =

Village in North Khorasan province, Iran

Kikanlu Persian: كيكانلو
- Village
- Location within Iran
- Coordinates: 37°38′04″N 57°02′23″E
- Country: Iran
- Province: North Khorasan
- County: Maneh
- District: Central
- Rural District: Atrak

Population (2016)
  - Total: 503
- Time zone: UTC+3:30 (IRST)

Kikanlu (Persian: كيكانلو) (Note: Also romanized as Keykānlū and Kīḵānlū; also known as Kīgānlū) is a village in Atrak Rural District (Note: Formerly Maneh Rural District) of the Central District (Note: Formerly Maneh District of Maneh and Samalqan County) in Maneh County, North Khorasan province, Iran.

== Demographics ==
=== Population ===
At the time of the 2006 National Census, the village's population was 590 in 170 households, when it was in Maneh District (Note: Renamed the Central District of Maneh County) of Maneh and Samalqan County. (Note: Renamed Samalqan County) The following census in 2011 counted 587 people in 183 households. The 2016 census measured the population of the village as 503 people in 173 households.

In 2023, the district was separated from the county in the establishment of Maneh County and renamed the Central District.
