= Qezel Qaleh-ye Bala =

Village in North Khorasan province, Iran

Qezel Qaleh-ye Bala Persian: قزل قلعه بالا
- Village
- Location within Iran
- Coordinates: 37°55′35″N 56°33′05″E
- Country: Iran
- Province: North Khorasan
- County: Maneh
- District: Shirin Su
- Rural District: Shirin Su

Population (2016)
  - Total: 423
- Time zone: UTC+3:30 (IRST)

Qezel Qaleh-ye Bala (Persian: قزل قلعه بالا) (Note: Also romanized as Qezel Qal‘eh-ye Bālā) is a village in Shirin Su Rural District of Shirin Su District in Maneh County, North Khorasan province, Iran.

== Demographics ==
=== Population ===
At the time of the 2006 National Census, the village's population was 284 in 60 households, when it was in Maneh District (Note: Renamed the Central District of Maneh County) of Maneh and Samalqan County. (Note: Renamed Samalqan County) The following census in 2011 counted 398 people in 82 households. The 2016 census measured the population of the village as 423 people in 98 households.

In 2023, the district was separated from the county in the establishment of Maneh County and renamed the Central District. The rural district was transferred to the new Shirin Su District.
