= Barbar Qaleh, North Khorasan =

Village in North Khorasan province, Iran

Barbar Qaleh Persian: بربرقلعه
- Village
- Location within Iran
- Coordinates: 37°44′51″N 57°10′43″E
- Country: Iran
- Province: North Khorasan
- County: Maneh
- District: Central
- Rural District: Atrak

Population (2016)
  - Total: 248
- Time zone: UTC+3:30 (IRST)

Barbar Qaleh (Persian: بربرقلعه) (Note: Also romanized as Barbar Qal‘eh; also known as Qal‘eh-ye Barbak and Qal‘eh-ye Barbar) is a village in Atrak Rural District (Note: Formerly Maneh Rural District) of the Central District (Note: Formerly Maneh District of Maneh and Samalqan County) in Maneh County, North Khorasan province, Iran.

== Demographics ==
=== Population ===
At the time of the 2006 National Census, the village's population was 380 in 85 households, when it was in Maneh District (Note: Renamed the Central District of Maneh County) of Maneh and Samalqan County. (Note: Renamed Samalqan County) The following census in 2011 counted 429 people in 119 households. The 2016 census measured the population of the village as 248 people in 74 households.

In 2023, the district was separated from the county in the establishment of Maneh County and renamed the Central District.
