= Injanlu =

Village in North Khorasan province, Iran

Injanlu Persian: اينجانلو
- Village
- Location within Iran
- Coordinates: 37°39′15″N 57°03′40″E
- Country: Iran
- Province: North Khorasan
- County: Maneh
- District: Central
- Rural District: Atrak

Population (2016)
  - Total: 75
- Time zone: UTC+3:30 (IRST)

Injanlu (Persian: اينجانلو) (Note: Also romanized as Īnjānlū) is a village in Atrak Rural District (Note: Formerly Maneh Rural District) of the Central District (Note: Formerly Maneh District of Maneh and Samalqan County) in Maneh County, North Khorasan province, Iran.

== Demographics ==
=== Population ===
At the time of the 2006 National Census, the village's population was 122 in 36 households, when it was in Maneh District (Note: Renamed the Central District of Maneh County) of Maneh and Samalqan County. (Note: Renamed Samalqan County) The following census in 2011 counted 114 people in 31 households. The 2016 census measured the population of the village as 75 people in 27 households.

In 2023, the district was separated from the county in the establishment of Maneh County and renamed the Central District.
