= Bazareh-ye Qarnas =

Village in North Khorasan province, Iran

Bazareh-ye Qarnas Persian: بازاره قارناس
- Village
- Location within Iran
- Coordinates: 37°39′47″N 57°04′24″E
- Country: Iran
- Province: North Khorasan
- County: Maneh
- District: Central
- Rural District: Atrak

Population (2016)
  - Total: 906
- Time zone: UTC+3:30 (IRST)

Bazareh-ye Qarnas (Persian: بازاره قارناس) (Note: Also romanized as Bāzāreh-ye Qārnās; also known as Bāzār and Bāzāreh) is a village in, and the capital of, Atrak Rural District (Note: Formerly Maneh Rural District) in the Central District (Note: Formerly Maneh District of Maneh and Samalqan County) and prior to that, its capital was the village of Pish Qaleh, now a city.

== Demographics ==
=== Population ===
At the time of the 2006 National Census, the village's population was 1,096 in 280 households, when it was in Maneh District (Note: Renamed the Central District of Maneh County) of Maneh and Samalqan County. (Note: Renamed Samalqan County) The following census in 2011 counted 988 people in 278 households. The 2016 census measured the population of the village as 906 people in 297 households.

In 2023, the district was separated from the county in the establishment of Maneh County and renamed the Central District.
