= Dashtak-e Sofla, North Khorasan =

Village in North Khorasan province, Iran

Dashtak-e Sofla Persian: دشتك سفلي
- Village
- Location within Iran
- Coordinates: 37°45′37″N 56°34′23″E
- Country: Iran
- Province: North Khorasan
- County: Maneh
- District: Central
- Rural District: Eshqabad

Population (2016)
  - Total: 597
- Time zone: UTC+3:30 (IRST)

Dashtak-e Sofla (Persian: دشتك سفلي) (Note: Also romanized as Dashtak-e Soflá; also known as Dashtak, Dashtak Kalāsi, Dashtak Qal’ehsi, and Dashtak-e Pā’īn) is a village in Eshqabad Rural District of the Central District (Note: Formerly Maneh District of Maneh and Samalqan County) in Maneh County, North Khorasan province, Iran.

== Demographics ==
=== Population ===
At the time of the 2006 National Census, the village's population was 519 in 117 households, when it was in Atrak Rural District (Note: Formerly Maneh Rural District) of Maneh District (Note: Renamed the Central District of Maneh County) in Maneh and Samalqan County. (Note: Renamed Samalqan County) The following census in 2011 counted 672 people in 164 households. The 2016 census measured the population of the village as 597 people in 128 households.

In 2023, the district was separated from the county in the establishment of Maneh County and renamed the Central District. Dashtak-e Sofla was transferred to Eshqabad Rural District created in the same district.
