= Kalayen =

Village in North Khorasan province, Iran

Kalayen Persian: كلاين
- Village
- Location within Iran
- Coordinates: 37°39′47″N 57°14′32″E
- Country: Iran
- Province: North Khorasan
- County: Maneh
- District: Central
- Rural District: Atrak

Population (2016)
  - Total: 141
- Time zone: UTC+3:30 (IRST)

Kalayen (Persian: كلاين) (Note: Also romanized as Kalāyen) is a village in Atrak Rural District (Note: Formerly Maneh Rural District) of the Central District (Note: Formerly Maneh District of Maneh and Samalqan County) in Maneh County, North Khorasan province, Iran.

== Demographics ==
=== Population ===
At the time of the 2006 National Census, the village's population was 195 in 42 households, when it was in Maneh District (Note: Renamed the Central District of Maneh County) of Maneh and Samalqan County. (Note: Renamed Samalqan County) The following census in 2011 counted 129 people in 33 households. The 2016 census measured the population of the village as 141 people in 37 households.

In 2023, the district was separated from the county in the establishment of Maneh County and renamed the Central District.
