= Tazeh Qaleh, Maneh =

Village in North Khorasan province, Iran

Tazeh Qaleh Persian: تازه قلعه
- Village
- Location within Iran
- Coordinates: 37°44′19″N 57°10′04″E
- Country: Iran
- Province: North Khorasan
- County: Maneh
- District: Central
- Rural District: Atrak

Population (2016)
  - Total: 138
- Time zone: UTC+3:30 (IRST)

Tazeh Qaleh (Persian: تازه قلعه) (Note: Also romanized as Tāzeh Qal‘eh) is a village in Atrak Rural District (Note: Formerly Maneh Rural District) of the Central District (Note: Formerly Maneh District of Maneh and Samalqan County) in Maneh County, North Khorasan province, Iran.

== Demographics ==
=== Population ===
At the time of the 2006 National Census, the village's population was 215 in 55 households, when it was in Maneh District (Note: Renamed the Central District of Maneh County) of Maneh and Samalqan County. (Note: Renamed Samalqan County) The following census in 2011 counted 203 people in 57 households. The 2016 census measured the population of the village as 138 people in 41 households.

In 2023, the district was separated from the county in the establishment of Maneh County and renamed the Central District.
