= Khartut =

Village in North Khorasan province, Iran

Khartut Persian: خرتوت
- Village
- Location within Iran
- Coordinates: 37°55′21″N 56°39′29″E
- Country: Iran
- Province: North Khorasan
- County: Maneh
- District: Shirin Su
- Rural District: Shirin Su

Population (2016)
  - Total: 703
- Time zone: UTC+3:30 (IRST)

Khartut (Persian: خرتوت) (Note: Also romanized as Khartūt) is a village in, and the former capital of, Shirin Su Rural District in Shirin Su District of Maneh County, North Khorasan province, Iran, serving as capital of the district. The capital of the rural district has been transferred to the village of Kalimani. (Note: Formerly known as Shahrak-e Kal Imani)

== Demographics ==
=== Population ===
At the time of the 2006 National Census, the village's population was 586 in 115 households, when it was in Maneh District (Note: Renamed the Central District of Maneh County) of Maneh and Samalqan County. (Note: Renamed Samalqan County) The following census in 2011 counted 678 people in 157 households. The 2016 census measured the population of the village as 703 people in 164 households.

In 2023, the district was separated from the county in the establishment of Maneh County and renamed the Central District. The rural district was transferred to the new Shirin Su District.
