= Chupli Tappeh =

Village in North Khorasan province, Iran

Chupli Tappeh Persian: چوپلي تپه
- Village
- Location within Iran
- Coordinates: 37°40′04″N 57°08′11″E
- Country: Iran
- Province: North Khorasan
- County: Maneh
- District: Central
- Rural District: Atrak

Population (2016)
  - Total: 563
- Time zone: UTC+3:30 (IRST)

Chupli Tappeh (Persian: چوپلي تپه) (Note: Also romanized as Chūplī Tappeh; also known as Chūblī Tappeh and Tappeh) is a village in Atrak Rural District (Note: Formerly Maneh Rural District) of the Central District (Note: Formerly Maneh District of Maneh and Samalqan County) in Maneh County, North Khorasan province, Iran.

== Demographics ==
=== Population ===
At the time of the 2006 National Census, the village's population was 531 in 138 households, when it was in Maneh District (Note: Renamed the Central District of Maneh County) of Maneh and Samalqan County. (Note: Renamed Samalqan County) The following census in 2011 counted 390 people in 116 households. The 2016 census measured the population of the village as 563 people in 184 households.

In 2023, the district was separated from the county in the establishment of Maneh County and renamed the Central District.
