= Qaleh Ostad =

Village in North Khorasan province, Iran

Qaleh Ostad Persian: قلعه استاد
- Village
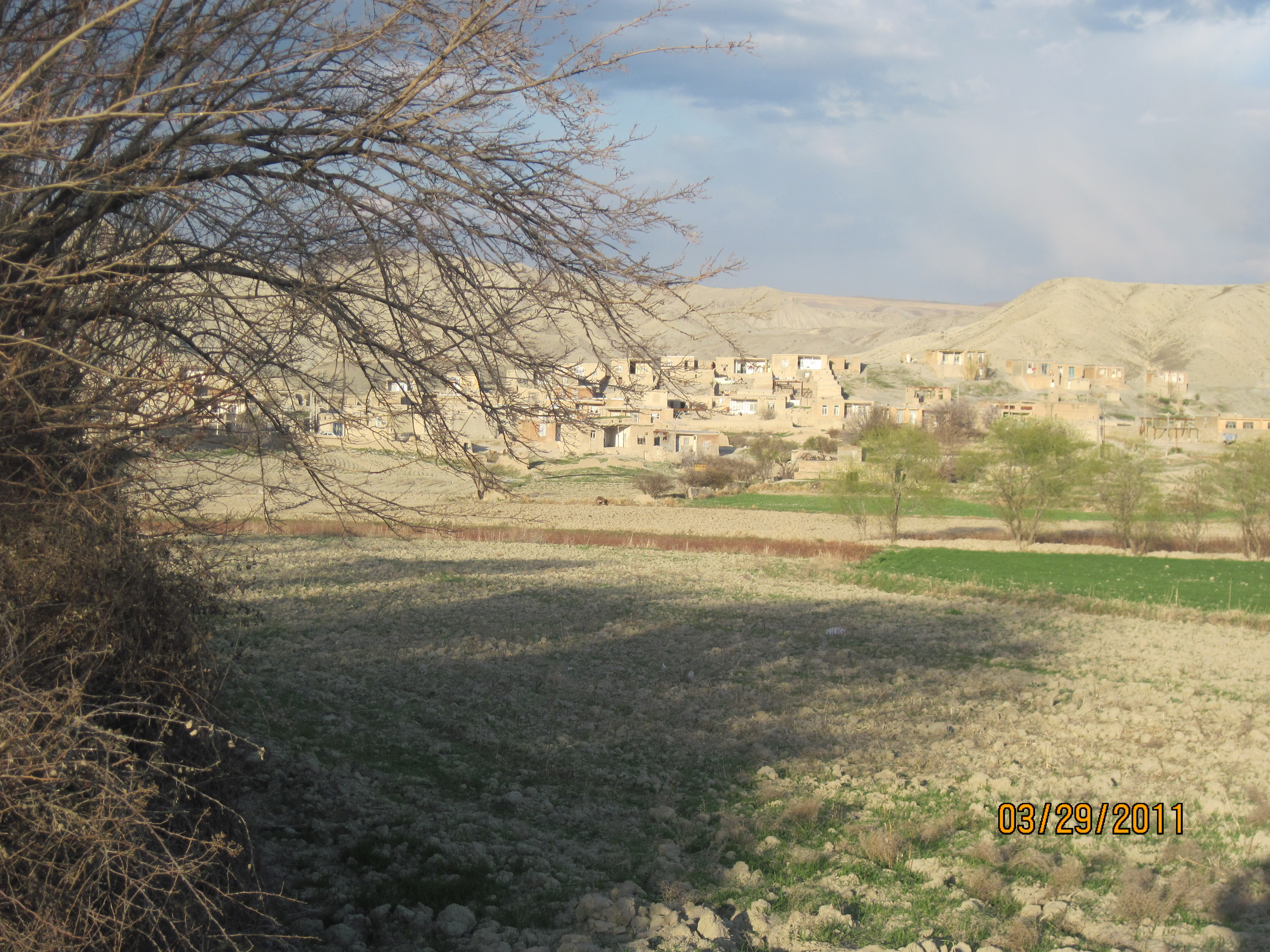
- The village of Qaleh Ostad

- Location within Iran
- Coordinates: 37°40′01″N 57°12′19″E
- Country: Iran
- Province: North Khorasan
- County: Maneh
- District: Central
- Rural District: Atrak

Population (2016)
  - Total: 351
- Time zone: UTC+3:30 (IRST)

Qaleh Ostad (Persian: قلعه استاد) (Note: Also romanized as Qal‘eh Ostād) is a village in Atrak Rural District (Note: Formerly Maneh Rural District) of the Central District (Note: Formerly Maneh District of Maneh and Samalqan County) in Maneh County, North Khorasan province, Iran.

== Demographics ==
=== Population ===
At the time of the 2006 National Census, the village's population was 427 in 98 households, when it was in Maneh District (Note: Renamed the Central District of Maneh County) of Maneh and Samalqan County. (Note: Renamed Samalqan County) The following census in 2011 counted 421 people in 116 households. The 2016 census measured the population of the village as 351 people in 109 households.

In 2023, the district was separated from the county in the establishment of Maneh County and renamed the Central District.
