= Pustin Duz, North Khorasan =

Village in North Khorasan province, Iran

Pustin Duz Persian: پوستين دوز
- Village
- Location within Iran
- Coordinates: 37°46′14″N 57°04′26″E
- Country: Iran
- Province: North Khorasan
- County: Maneh
- District: Central
- Rural District: Atrak

Population (2016)
  - Total: 117
- Time zone: UTC+3:30 (IRST)

Pustin Duz (Persian: پوستین‌دوز) (Note: Also romanized as Pūstīn Dūz) is a village in Atrak Rural District (Note: Formerly Maneh Rural District) of the Central District (Note: Formerly Maneh District of Maneh and Samalqan County) in Maneh County, North Khorasan province, Iran.

== Demographics ==
=== Population ===
At the time of the 2006 National Census, the village's population was 161 in 34 households, when it was in Maneh District (Note: Renamed the Central District of Maneh County) of Maneh and Samalqan County. (Note: Renamed Samalqan County) The following census in 2011 counted 111 people in 31 households. The 2016 census measured the population of the village as 117 people in 35 households.

In 2023, the district was separated from the county in the establishment of Maneh County and renamed the Central District.
