= Takht-e Mish =

Village in North Khorasan province, Iran

Takht-e Mish Persian: تخت ميش
- Village
- Location within Iran
- Coordinates: 37°40′27″N 57°11′04″E
- Country: Iran
- Province: North Khorasan
- County: Maneh
- District: Central
- Rural District: Atrak

Population (2016)
  - Total: 230
- Time zone: UTC+3:30 (IRST)

Takht-e Mish (Persian: تخت ميش) (Note: Also romanized as Takht-e Mīsh) is a village in Atrak Rural District (Note: Formerly Maneh Rural District) of the Central District (Note: Formerly Maneh District of Maneh and Samalqan County) in Maneh County, North Khorasan province, Iran.

== Demographics ==
=== Population ===
At the time of the 2006 National Census, the village's population was 211 in 53 households, when it was in Maneh District (Note: Renamed the Central District of Maneh County) of Maneh and Samalqan County. (Note: Renamed Samalqan County) The following census in 2011 counted 165 people in 51 households. The 2016 census measured the population of the village as 230 people in 72 households.

In 2023, the district was separated from the county in the establishment of Maneh County and renamed the Central District.
