= Tup Chenar =

Village in North Khorasan province, Iran

Tup Chenar Persian: توپچنار
- Village
- Location within Iran
- Coordinates: 37°43′26″N 57°14′14″E
- Country: Iran
- Province: North Khorasan
- County: Maneh
- District: Central
- Rural District: Atrak

Population (2016)
  - Total: 429
- Time zone: UTC+3:30 (IRST)

Tup Chenar (Persian: توپچنار) (Note: Also romanized as Tūp Chenār; also known as Top Chenār and Tū Chenār) is a village in Atrak Rural District (Note: Formerly Maneh Rural District) of the Central District (Note: Formerly Maneh District of Maneh and Samalqan County) in Maneh County, North Khorasan province, Iran.

== Demographics ==
=== Population ===
At the time of the 2006 National Census, the village's population was 401 in 96 households, when it was in Maneh District (Note: Renamed the Central District of Maneh County) of Maneh and Samalqan County. (Note: Renamed Samalqan County) The following census in 2011 counted 357 people in 98 households. The 2016 census measured the population of the village as 429 people in 120 households.

In 2023, the district was separated from the county in the establishment of Maneh County and renamed the Central District.
