= Kashkabad, North Khorasan =

Village in North Khorasan province, Iran

Kashkabad Persian: كشك اباد
- Village
- Location within Iran
- Coordinates: 37°39′02″N 57°07′06″E
- Country: Iran
- Province: North Khorasan
- County: Maneh
- District: Central
- Rural District: Atrak

Population (2016)
  - Total: 483
- Time zone: UTC+3:30 (IRST)

Kashkabad (Persian: كشك اباد) (Note: Also romanized as Kashkābād; also known as Māneh and Mānesh) is a village in Atrak Rural District (Note: Formerly Maneh Rural District) of the Central District (Note: Formerly Maneh District of Maneh and Samalqan County) in Maneh County, North Khorasan province, Iran.

== Demographics ==
=== Population ===
At the time of the 2006 National Census, the village's population was 533 in 128 households, when it was in Maneh District (Note: Renamed the Central District of Maneh County) of Maneh and Samalqan County. (Note: Renamed Samalqan County) The following census in 2011 counted 418 people in 110 households. The 2016 census measured the population of the village as 483 people in 158 households.

In 2023, the district was separated from the county in the establishment of Maneh County and renamed the Central District.
