= Kalateh-ye Anamusi =

Village in North Khorasan province, Iran

Kalateh-ye Anamusi Persian: كلاته اناموسي
- Village
- Location within Iran
- Country: Iran
- Province: North Khorasan
- County: Maneh
- District: Central
- Rural District: Atrak

Population (2016)
  - Total: 182
- Time zone: UTC+3:30 (IRST)

Kalateh-ye Anamusi (Persian: كلاته اناموسي) (Note: Also romanized as Kalāteh-ye Ānāmūsī) is a village in Atrak Rural District (Note: Formerly Maneh Rural District) of the Central District (Note: Formerly Maneh District of Maneh and Samalqan County) in Maneh County, North Khorasan province, Iran.

== Demographics ==
=== Population ===
At the time of the 2006 National Census, the village's population was 39 in nine households, when it was in Maneh District (Note: Renamed the Central District of Maneh County) of Maneh and Samalqan County. (Note: Renamed Samalqan County) The following census in 2011 counted 41 people in 12 households. The 2016 census measured the population of the village as 47 people in 13 households.

In 2023, the district was separated from the county in the establishment of Maneh County and renamed the Central District.
