= Khorramdeh-e Gharbi =

Village in North Khorasan province, Iran

Khorramdeh-e Gharbi Persian: خرم ده غربي
- Village
- Location within Iran
- Coordinates: 37°43′05″N 56°47′06″E
- Country: Iran
- Province: North Khorasan
- County: Maneh
- District: Central
- Rural District: Eshqabad

Population (2016)
  - Total: 527
- Time zone: UTC+3:30 (IRST)

Khorramdeh-e Gharbi (Persian: خرم ده غربي) (Note: Also romanized as Khorramdeh-e Gharbī; also known as Kharakī, Kharakī-ye Barbarhā, and Kharāqi) is a village in Eshqabad Rural District of the Central District (Note: Formerly Maneh District of Maneh and Samalqan County) in Maneh County, North Khorasan province, Iran.

== Demographics ==
=== Population ===
At the time of the 2006 National Census, the village's population was 618 in 162 households, when it was in Atrak Rural District (Note: Formerly Maneh Rural District) of Maneh District (Note: Renamed the Central District of Maneh County) in Maneh and Samalqan County. (Note: Renamed Samalqan County) The following census in 2011 counted 553 people in 163 households. The 2016 census measured the population of the village as 527 people in 154 households.

In 2023, the district was separated from the county in the establishment of Maneh County and renamed the Central District. Khorramdeh-e Gharbi was transferred to Eshqabad Rural District created in the same district.
