= Damdami =

Village in North Khorasan province, Iran

Damdami Persian: دامدامي
- Village
- Location within Iran
- Coordinates: 37°34′02″N 56°15′58″E
- Country: Iran
- Province: North Khorasan
- County: Samalqan
- District: Central
- Rural District: Jeyransu

Population (2016)
  - Total: 70
- Time zone: UTC+3:30 (IRST)

Damdami (Persian: دامدامي) (Note: Also romanized as Dāmdāmī) is a village in Jeyransu Rural District of the Central District in Samalqan County, (Note: Formerly Maneh and Samalqan County) North Khorasan province, Iran.

== Demographics ==
=== Population ===
At the time of the 2006 National Census, the village's population was 119 in 32 households. The following census in 2011 counted 98 people in 25 households. The 2016 census measured the population of the village as 70 people in 22 households.
