= Esfidan, Maneh =

Village in North Khorasan province, Iran

Esfidan Persian: اسفيدان
- Village
- Location within Iran
- Coordinates: 37°38′40″N 57°03′15″E
- Country: Iran
- Province: North Khorasan
- County: Maneh
- District: Central
- Rural District: Atrak

Population (2016)
  - Total: 129
- Time zone: UTC+3:30 (IRST)

Esfidan (Persian: اسفيدان) (Note: Also romanized as Esfīdān; also known as Astīdān, Esfīdān Māneh, Espīān, and Ispāīn) is a village in Atrak Rural District (Note: Formerly Maneh Rural District) of the Central District (Note: Formerly Maneh District of Maneh and Samalqan County) in Maneh County, North Khorasan province, Iran.

== Demographics ==
=== Population ===
At the time of the 2006 National Census, the village's population was 186 in 43 households, when it was in Maneh District (Note: Renamed the Central District of Maneh County) of Maneh and Samalqan County. (Note: Renamed Samalqan County) The following census in 2011 counted 181 people in 46 households. The 2016 census measured the population of the village as 129 people in 36 households.

In 2023, the district was separated from the county in the establishment of Maneh County and renamed the Central District.
