= Qezel Lar =

Village in North Khorasan province, Iran

Qezel Lar Persian: قزل لر
- Village
- Location within Iran
- Coordinates: 37°40′00″N 56°26′07″E
- Country: Iran
- Province: North Khorasan
- County: Samalqan
- District: Central
- Rural District: Jeyransu

Population (2016)
  - Total: 646
- Time zone: UTC+3:30 (IRST)

Qezel Lar (Persian: قزل لر) (Note: Also known as Qarah Bāgh (قره باغ) and Qezlar) is a village in Jeyransu Rural District of the Central District in Samalqan County, (Note: Formerly Maneh and Samalqan County) North Khorasan province, Iran.

== Demographics ==
=== Population ===
At the time of the 2006 National Census, the village's population was 502 in 108 households. The following census in 2011 counted 587 people in 139 households. The 2016 census measured the population of the village as 646 people in 143 households.
