= Kalateh-ye Baz =

Village in North Khorasan province, Iran

Kalateh-ye Baz Persian: كلاته بز
- Village
- Location within Iran
- Coordinates: 37°47′14″N 56°26′16″E
- Country: Iran
- Province: North Khorasan
- County: Samalqan
- District: Central
- Rural District: Jeyransu

Population (2016)
  - Total: 187
- Time zone: UTC+3:30 (IRST)

Kalateh-ye Baz (Persian: كلاته بز) (Note: Also romanized as Kalāteh-ye Bāz) is a village in Jeyransu Rural District of the Central District in Samalqan County, (Note: Formerly Maneh and Samalqan County) North Khorasan province, Iran.

== Demographics ==
=== Population ===
At the time of the 2006 National Census, the village's population was 156 in 37 households. The following census in 2011 counted 178 people in 43 households. The 2016 census measured the population of the village as 187 people in 48 households.
