= Abeh Mohammadjan =

Village in North Khorasan province, Iran

Abeh Mohammadjan Persian: ابه محمدجان
- Village
- Location within Iran
- Coordinates: 37°49′10″N 56°21′36″E
- Country: Iran
- Province: North Khorasan
- County: Samalqan
- District: Central
- Rural District: Jeyransu

Population (2016)
  - Total: 189
- Time zone: UTC+3:30 (IRST)

Abeh Mohammadjan (Persian: ابه محمدجان) (Note: Also romanized as Ābeh Moḥammadjān) is a village in Jeyransu Rural District of the Central District in Samalqan County, (Note: Formerly Maneh and Samalqan County) North Khorasan province, Iran.

== Demographics ==
=== Population ===
At the time of the 2006 National Census, the village's population was 291 in 64 households. The following census in 2011 counted 193 people in 45 households. The 2016 census measured the population of the village as 189 people in 53 households.
