= Daleq Tappeh =

Village in North Khorasan province, Iran

Daleq Tappeh Persian: دالق تپه
- Village
- Location within Iran
- Coordinates: 37°48′53″N 56°28′05″E
- Country: Iran
- Province: North Khorasan
- County: Samalqan
- District: Central
- Rural District: Jeyransu

Population (2016)
  - Total: 314
- Time zone: UTC+3:30 (IRST)

Daleq Tappeh (Persian: دالق تپه) (Note: Also romanized as Dāleq Tappeh; also known as Deleq Tappeh (دلق تپه)) is a village in Jeyransu Rural District of the Central District in Samalqan County, (Note: Formerly Maneh and Samalqan County) North Khorasan province, Iran.

== Demographics ==
=== Population ===
At the time of the 2006 National Census, the village's population was 223 in 41 households. The following census in 2011 counted 315 people in 79 households. The 2016 census measured the population of the village as 314 people in 90 households.
