= Suqeh, North Khorasan =

Village in North Khorasan province, Iran

Suqeh Persian: سوقه
- Village
- Location within Iran
- Coordinates: 37°35′00″N 56°09′26″E
- Country: Iran
- Province: North Khorasan
- County: Samalqan
- District: Central
- Rural District: Jeyransu

Population (2016)
  - Total: 70
- Time zone: UTC+3:30 (IRST)

Suqeh (Persian: سوقه) (Note: Also romanized as Sūqeh; also known as Saga, Soogheh, Sūqā, and Sūqeh-ye Bālā) is a village in Jeyransu Rural District of the Central District in Samalqan County, (Note: Formerly Maneh and Samalqan County) North Khorasan province, Iran.

== Demographics ==
=== Population ===
At the time of the 2006 National Census, the village's population was 155 in 47 households. The following census in 2011 counted 102 people in 31 households. The 2016 census measured the population of the village as 70 people in 27 households.
