= Tazeh Yab =

Village in North Khorasan province, Iran

Tazeh Yab Persian: تازه ياب
- Village
- Location within Iran
- Coordinates: 37°50′00″N 56°25′38″E
- Country: Iran
- Province: North Khorasan
- County: Samalqan
- District: Central
- Rural District: Jeyransu

Population (2016)
  - Total: 933
- Time zone: UTC+3:30 (IRST)

Tazeh Yab (Persian: تازه ياب) (Note: Also romanized as Tāzeh Yāb; also known as Tāzeh Yāb-e Garkaz) is a village in Jeyransu Rural District of the Central District in Samalqan County, (Note: Formerly Maneh and Samalqan County) North Khorasan province, Iran.

== Demographics ==
=== Population ===
At the time of the 2006 National Census, the village's population was 827 in 171 households. The following census in 2011 counted 1,021 people in 244 households. The 2016 census measured the population of the village as 933 people in 228 households.
