= Mansurabad, North Khorasan =

Village in North Khorasan province, Iran

Mansurabad Persian: منصوراباد
- Village
- Location within Iran
- Coordinates: 37°36′39″N 56°08′40″E
- Country: Iran
- Province: North Khorasan
- County: Samalqan
- District: Central
- Rural District: Jeyransu

Population (2016)
  - Total: 55
- Time zone: UTC+3:30 (IRST)

Mansurabad (Persian: منصوراباد) (Note: Also romanized as Manşūrābād) is a village in Jeyransu Rural District of the Central District in Samalqan County, (Note: Formerly Maneh and Samalqan County) North Khorasan province, Iran.

== Demographics ==
=== Population ===
At the time of the 2006 National Census, the village's population was 13 in four households. The following census in 2011 counted 17 people in five households. The 2016 census measured the population of the village as 55 people in 21 households.
