= Dashtak-e Olya =

Dashtak-e Olya or Dashtak Olya or Dashtok-e Olya (Persian: دشتك عليا) or Dashtak-e Bala or Dashtok-e Bala, both meaning "Upper Dashtak", may refer to:

- Dashtak-e Olya, Fars
- Dashtak-e Olya, Dana, Kohgiluyeh and Boyer-Ahmad Province
- Dashtak-e Olya, North Khorasan
- Dashtok-e Olya, Yazd
