= Dasht-e Gorgan =

Dasht Gorgan or Dasht-e Goran (Persian: دشت گرگان) may refer to:

- The Gorgan Plain in Golestan Province
- Gonbad-e Kavus city
- Dasht-e Gorgan, Khuzestan
- Dasht Gorgan, North Khorasan

== See also ==
- Gorganrud River
