= Amand, North Khorasan =

Village in North Khorasan province, Iran

Amand Persian: امند
- Village
- Location within Iran
- Coordinates: 37°46′23″N 56°21′07″E
- Country: Iran
- Province: North Khorasan
- County: Samalqan
- District: Central
- Rural District: Jeyransu

Population (2016)
  - Total: 1,126
- Time zone: UTC+3:30 (IRST)

Amand (Persian: امند) (Note: Also romanized as Āmand) is a village in Jeyransu Rural District of the Central District in Samalqan County, (Note: Formerly Maneh and Samalqan County) North Khorasan province, Iran.

== Demographics ==
=== Population ===
At the time of the 2006 National Census, the village's population was 966 in 263 households. The following census in 2011 counted 1,120 people in 341 households. The 2016 census measured the population of the village as 1,126 people in 344 households.
