= Incheh-ye Sofla, North Khorasan =

Village in North Khorasan province, Iran

Incheh-ye Sofla Persian: اينچه سفلي
- Village
- Location within Iran
- Coordinates: 37°49′22″N 56°25′34″E
- Country: Iran
- Province: North Khorasan
- County: Samalqan
- District: Central
- Rural District: Jeyransu

Population (2016)
  - Total: 1,844
- Time zone: UTC+3:30 (IRST)

Incheh-ye Sofla (Persian: اينچه سفلي) (Note: Also romanized as Īncheh Soflá and Īncheh-ye Soflá; also known as Īncheh-ye Pā’īn) is a village in Jeyransu Rural District of the Central District in Samalqan County, (Note: Formerly Maneh and Samalqan County) North Khorasan province, Iran.

== Demographics ==
=== Population ===
At the time of the 2006 National Census, the village's population was 1,503 in 356 households. The following census in 2011 counted 1,978 people in 547 households. The 2016 census measured the population of the village as 1,844 people in 546 households, the most populous in its rural district.
