= Gargaz-e Tazeh Yal =

Village in North Khorasan province, Iran

Gargaz-e Tazeh Yal Persian: گرگزتازه يل
- Village
- Location within Iran
- Coordinates: 37°48′56″N 56°29′43″E
- Country: Iran
- Province: North Khorasan
- County: Samalqan
- District: Central
- Rural District: Jeyransu

Population (2016)
  - Total: 640
- Time zone: UTC+3:30 (IRST)

Gargaz-e Tazeh Yal (Persian: گرگزتازه يل) (Note: Also romanized as Gargaz-e Tāzeh Yal; also known as Garkaz-e Tāzeh Yal) is a village in Jeyransu Rural District of the Central District in Samalqan County, (Note: Formerly Maneh and Samalqan County) North Khorasan province, Iran.

== Demographics ==
=== Population ===
At the time of the 2006 National Census, the village's population was 551 in 112 households. The following census in 2011 counted 669 people in 165 households. The 2016 census measured the population of the village as 640 people in 154 households.
