= Behkadeh-ye Razavi =

Village in North Khorasan province, Iran

Behkadeh-ye Razavi Persian: بهكده رضوي
- Village
- Location within Iran
- Coordinates: 37°34′03″N 56°12′49″E
- Country: Iran
- Province: North Khorasan
- County: Samalqan
- District: Central
- Rural District: Jeyransu

Population (2016)
  - Total: 644
- Time zone: UTC+3:30 (IRST)

Behkadeh-ye Razavi (Persian: بهكده رضوي) (Note: Also romanized as Behkadeh-ye Raẕavī; also known as Behkadeh-e-Rājī, Behkadeh-ye Shāhābād, and Shāhābād (شاه اباد)) is a village in Jeyransu Rural District of the Central District in Samalqan County, (Note: Formerly Maneh and Samalqan County) North Khorasan province, Iran.

== Demographics ==
=== Population ===
At the time of the 2006 National Census, the village's population was 957 in 281 households. The following census in 2011 counted 689 people in 196 households. The 2016 census measured the population of the village as 644 people in 219 households.
