= Gaz Bashi =

Village in North Khorasan province, Iran

Gaz Bashi Persian: گزباشي
- Village
- Location within Iran
- Coordinates: 37°46′04″N 56°26′16″E
- Country: Iran
- Province: North Khorasan
- County: Samalqan
- District: Central
- Rural District: Jeyransu

Population (2016)
  - Total: 799
- Time zone: UTC+3:30 (IRST)

Gaz Bashi (Persian: گزباشي) (Note: Also romanized as Gaz Bāshī and Gezbāshī; also known as Gazbāshī-ye Soflá and Yūz Bāshī) is a village in Jeyransu Rural District of the Central District in Samalqan County, (Note: Formerly Maneh and Samalqan County) North Khorasan province, Iran.

== Demographics ==
=== Population ===
At the time of the 2006 National Census, the village's population was 598 in 146 households. The following census in 2011 counted 809 people in 198 households. The 2016 census measured the population of the village as 799 people in 201 households.
