= Cheshmeh Qorban Shadi =

Village in North Khorasan province, Iran

Cheshmeh Qorban Shadi Persian: چشمه قربان شادي
- Village
- Location within Iran
- Coordinates: 37°50′02″N 56°21′11″E
- Country: Iran
- Province: North Khorasan
- County: Samalqan
- District: Central
- Rural District: Jeyransu

Population (2016)
  - Total: 605
- Time zone: UTC+3:30 (IRST)

Cheshmeh Qorban Shadi (Persian: چشمه قربان شادي) (Note: Also romanized as Cheshmeh Qorbān Shādī; formerly known as Cheshmeh (چشمه)) is a village in Jeyransu Rural District of the Central District in Samalqan County, (Note: Formerly Maneh and Samalqan County) North Khorasan province, Iran.

== Demographics ==
=== Population ===
At the time of the 2006 National Census, the village's population, as Cheshmeh, was 531 in 118 households. The following census in 2011 counted 642 people in 174 households, by which time the village was listed as Cheshmeh Qorban Shadi. The 2016 census measured the population of the village as 605 people in 173 households.
