= Qarah Qanlu =

Qarah Qanlu or Qareh Qanlu (Persian: قره قانلو) may refer to:

- Qareh Qanlu, East Azerbaijan
- Qarah Qanlu, Bojnord, North Khorasan
- Qarah Qanlu, Maneh and Samalqan, North Khorasan
