= Khorramdeh =

Khorramdeh (Persian: خرم ده) may refer to:

- Khorramdeh-e Gharbi
- Khorramdeh-e Sharqi
