= Incheh-ye Olya, North Khorasan =

Village in North Khorasan province, Iran

Incheh-ye Olya Persian: اينچه عليا
- Village
- Location within Iran
- Coordinates: 37°37′26″N 56°24′23″E
- Country: Iran
- Province: North Khorasan
- County: Samalqan
- District: Central
- Rural District: Jeyransu

Population (2016)
  - Total: 1,054
- Time zone: UTC+3:30 (IRST)

Incheh-ye Olya (Persian: اينچه عليا) (Note: Also romanized as Īncheh-ye ‘Olyā; also known as Incha, Īncheh, Īncheh-ye Bālā, and Lencheh) is a village in Jeyransu Rural District of the Central District in Samalqan County, (Note: Formerly Maneh and Samalqan County) North Khorasan province, Iran.

== Demographics ==
=== Population ===
At the time of the 2006 National Census, the village's population was 1,059 in 306 households. The following census in 2011 counted 1,191 people in 355 households. The 2016 census measured the population of the village as 1,054 people in 328 households.
