= Chal Bash =

Village in North Khorasan province, Iran

Chal Bash Persian: چالباش
- Village
- Location within Iran
- Coordinates: 37°28′52″N 56°09′38″E
- Country: Iran
- Province: North Khorasan
- County: Samalqan
- District: Central
- Rural District: Jeyransu

Population (2016)
  - Total: Below reporting threshold
- Time zone: UTC+3:30 (IRST)

Chal Bash (Persian: چالباش) (Note: Also romanized as Chāl Bāsh) is a village in Jeyransu Rural District of the Central District in Samalqan County, (Note: Formerly Maneh and Samalqan County) North Khorasan province, Iran.

== Demographics ==
=== Population ===
At the time of the 2006 National Census, the village's population was 21 in nine households. The following censuses in 2011 and 2016 counted a population below the reporting threshold.
