= Tajik, Iran =

Village in North Khorasan province, Iran

Tajik Persian: تاجيك
- Village
- Location within Iran
- Coordinates: 37°49′50″N 56°26′23″E
- Country: Iran
- Province: North Khorasan
- County: Samalqan
- District: Central
- Rural District: Jeyransu

Population (2016)
  - Total: 709
- Time zone: UTC+3:30 (IRST)

Tajik (Persian: تاجيك) (Note: Also romanized as Tājīk) is a village in Jeyransu Rural District of the Central District in Samalqan County, (Note: Formerly Maneh and Samalqan County) North Khorasan province, Iran.

== Demographics ==
=== Population ===
At the time of the 2006 National Census, the village's population was 532 in 120 households. The following census in 2011 counted 772 people in 201 households. The 2016 census measured the population of the village as 709 people in 183 households.
