= Garmab, Samalqan =

Village in North Khorasan province, Iran

Garmab Persian: گرماب
- Village
- Location within Iran
- Coordinates: 37°44′13″N 56°19′35″E
- Country: Iran
- Province: North Khorasan
- County: Samalqan
- District: Central
- Rural District: Jeyransu

Population (2016)
  - Total: 382
- Time zone: UTC+3:30 (IRST)

Garmab (Persian: گرماب) (Note: Also romanized as Garmāb) is a village in, and the capital of, Jeyransu Rural District in the Central District of Samalqan County, (Note: Formerly Maneh and Samalqan County) North Khorasan province, Iran.

== Demographics ==
=== Population ===
At the time of the 2006 National Census, the village's population was 326 in 82 households. The following census in 2011 counted 391 people in 101 households. The 2016 census measured the population of the village as 382 people in 104 households.
