= Vehicle registration plates of North Khorasan =

North Khorasan vehicle license plates

North Khorasan's code is 26. In public cars, Taxis and Governal cars the letter is always the same. But in private owned cars this letter (ب) depends on the city.

۱۲ ۳۴۵	۲۶

City	Letter
Bojnord	ج,ب
Shirvan	ص
Esfarayen	ط
Jajrom	ق
Ashkhaneh	ل
Faruj	م
