= Dasht-e Gorgan, North Khorasan =

Village in North Khorasan province, Iran

Dasht-e Gorgan Persian: دشت گرگان
- Village
- Location within Iran
- Coordinates: 37°33′49″N 56°14′28″E
- Country: Iran
- Province: North Khorasan
- County: Samalqan
- District: Central
- Rural District: Jeyransu

Population (2016)
  - Total: 34
- Time zone: UTC+3:30 (IRST)

Dasht-e Gorgan (Persian: دشت گرگان) (Note: Also romanized as Dasht-e Gorgān) is a village in Jeyransu Rural District of the Central District in Samalqan County, (Note: Formerly Maneh and Samalqan County) North Khorasan province, Iran.

== Demographics ==
=== Population ===
At the time of the 2006 National Census, the village's population was 60 in 19 households. The following census in 2011 counted 42 people in 14 households. The 2016 census measured the population of the village as 34 people in 13 households.
