= Dashtuk =

Dashtuk (Persian: دشتوك) may refer to:

- Dashtuk, Sistan and Baluchestan
- Dashtuk, South Khorasan

== See also ==
- Dashtak (disambiguation)
