= Shabli =

Shabli (Persian: شبلي) may refer to:

- Shabli, Ardabil
- Shabli, North Khorasan
