= Dashtak-e Sofla =

Dashtak-e Sofla or Dashtak Sofla or Dashtok-e Sofla (Persian: دشتك سفلي) may refer to:

- Dashtak-e Sofla, North Khorasan
- Dashtok-e Sofla, Yazd
