= Eshqabad Rural District (Maneh County) =

Rural district in North Khorasan province, Iran

Eshqabad Rural District Persian: دهستان عشق‌آباد
- Rural District
- Location within Iran
- Coordinates: 37°42′N 56°53′E
- Country: Iran
- Province: North Khorasan
- County: Maneh
- District: Central
- Established: 2023
- Capital: Eshqabad
- Time zone: UTC+3:30 (IRST)

Eshqabad Rural District (Persian: دهستان عشق‌آباد) is in the Central District (Note: Formerly Maneh District of Maneh and Samalqan County) of Maneh County, North Khorasan province, Iran. Its capital is the village of Eshqabad, whose population at the time of the 2016 National Census was 678 in 200 households.

== History ==
In 2023, Maneh District (Note: Renamed the Central District of Maneh County) of Maneh and Samalqan County (Note: Renamed Samalqan County) was separated from the county in the establishment of Maneh County and renamed the Central District. Eshqabad Rural District was created in the same district.

== Other villages in the rural district ==
- Agh Mazar
- Aminabad
- Borj-e Zanganlu
- Dashtak-e Sofla
- Gazabad
- Kalateh-ye Bashim
- Kalateh-ye Chenar
- Khorramdeh-e Gharbi
- Khorramdeh-e Sharqi
- Kushki Kikanlu
- Kushki Raji
- Kushki Torkaman
- Qaleh Bid
- Qarah Aqaj-e Bala
- Qarah Aqaj-e Pain
- Qesti Moaven
- Shesh Khaneh
