= Qarah Qanlu, Samalqan =

Village in North Khorasan province, Iran

Qarah Qanlu Persian: قره قانلو
- Village
- Location within Iran
- Coordinates: 37°48′00″N 56°22′00″E
- Country: Iran
- Province: North Khorasan
- County: Samalqan
- District: Central
- Rural District: Jeyransu

Population (2016)
  - Total: 632
- Time zone: UTC+3:30 (IRST)

Qarah Qanlu (Persian: قره قانلو) (Note: Also romanized as Qarah Qānlū) is a village in Jeyransu Rural District of the Central District in Samalqan County, (Note: Formerly Maneh and Samalqan County) North Khorasan province, Iran.

== Demographics ==
=== Population ===
At the time of the 2006 National Census, the village's population was 606 in 160 households. The following census in 2011 counted 637 people in 204 households. The 2016 census measured the population of the village as 632 people in 193 households.
