= Mohammadabad, Maneh =

Village in North Khorasan province, Iran

Mohammadabad Persian: محمداباد
- Village
- Location within Iran
- Coordinates: 37°41′52″N 57°04′34″E
- Country: Iran
- Province: North Khorasan
- County: Maneh
- District: Central
- Rural District: Atrak

Population (2016)
  - Total: 2,267
- Time zone: UTC+3:30 (IRST)
- Area code: 0098583
- Website: ma-m.blogfa.com

Mohammadabad (Persian: محمداباد) (Note: Also romanized as Moḩammadābād; also known as Muhammadābād) is a village in Atrak Rural District (Note: Formerly Maneh Rural District) of the Central District (Note: Formerly Maneh District of Maneh and Samalqan County) in Maneh County, North Khorasan province, Iran, serving as capital of the district.

== Demographics ==
=== Population ===
At the time of the 2006 National Census, the village's population was 2,135 in 593 households, when it was in Maneh District (Note: Renamed the Central District of Maneh County) of Maneh and Samalqan County. (Note: Renamed Samalqan County) The following census in 2011 counted 2,531 people in 756 households. The 2016 census measured the population of the village as 2,267 people in 735 households, the most populous in its rural district.

In 2023, the district was separated from the county in the establishment of Maneh County and renamed the Central District.
