= Espian =

Espian or Ispain may refer to:

- Esfidan, Maneh and Samalqan
- Nowabad-e Espian
