= Kohneh Jolgeh Rural District =

Rural district in North Khorasan province, Iran

Kohneh Jolgeh Rural District Persian: دهستان کهنه جلگه
- Rural District
- Location within Iran
- Coordinates: 38°04′N 56°26′E
- Country: Iran
- Province: North Khorasan
- County: Maneh
- District: Shirin Su
- Established: 2023
- Capital: Kohneh Jolgeh
- Time zone: UTC+3:30 (IRST)

Kohneh Jolgeh Rural District (Persian: دهستان کهنه جلگه) is in Shirin Su District of Maneh County, North Khorasan province, Iran. Its capital is the village of Kohneh Jolgeh, whose population at the time of the 2016 National Census was 2,010 people in 467 households.

== History ==
In 2023, Maneh District (Note: Renamed the Central District of Maneh County) of Maneh and Samalqan County (Note: Renamed Samalqan County) was separated from the county in the establishment of Maneh County and renamed the Central District. Kohneh Jolgeh Rural District was created in the new Shirin Su District.

== Other villages in the rural district ==
- Kalateh-ye Allah Qoli
- Kariz
- Post Darreh
- Sakhli Ilman
- Shabli
- Shatut
- Shur Su
- Yar Cheli
