= Jeyransu Rural District =

Rural district in North Khorasan province, Iran

Jeyransu Rural District Persian: دهستان جيرانسو
- Rural District
- Location within Iran
- Coordinates: 37°41′24″N 56°22′48″E
- Country: Iran
- Province: North Khorasan
- County: Samalqan
- District: Central
- Established: 1987
- Capital: Garmab

Population (2016)
  - Total: 13,281
- Time zone: UTC+3:30 (IRST)

Jeyransu Rural District (Persian: دهستان جيرانسو) is in the Central District of Samalqan County, (Note: Formerly Maneh and Samalqan County) North Khorasan province, Iran. Its capital is the village of Garmab.

== Demographics ==
=== Population ===
At the time of the 2006 National Census, the rural district's population was 10,894 in 2,761 households. There were 13,968 inhabitants in 3,659 households at the following census of 2011. The 2016 census measured the population of the rural district as 13,281 in 3,579 households. The most populous of its 24 villages was Incheh-ye Sofla, with 1,844 people.

=== Other villages in the rural district ===
- Abeh Mohammadjan
- Amand
- Behkadeh-ye Razavi
- Chal Bash
- Cheshmeh Qorban Shadi
- Daleq Tappeh
- Damdami
- Dasht-e Gorgan
- Dashtak-e Olya
- Gargaz-e Tazeh Yal
- Gaz Bashi
- Incheh-ye Olya
- Kalateh-ye Baz
- Mansurabad
- Padegan-e Nazami Shahrabad
- Qarah Qanlu
- Qezel Lar
- Suqeh
- Tajik
- Tazeh Yab
