= Pish Qaleh =

City in North Khorasan province, Iran

Pish Qaleh Persian: پيش قلعه
- City
- Location within Iran
- Coordinates: 37°39′06″N 57°00′05″E
- Country: Iran
- Province: North Khorasan
- County: Maneh
- District: Central
- Established as a city: 2003

Population (2016)
  - Total: 2,001
- Time zone: UTC+3:30 (IRST)

Pish Qaleh (Persian: پيش قلعه) (Note: Also romanized as Pīsh Qal‘eh; also known as Qal‘eh) is a city in the Central District (Note: Formerly Maneh District of Samalqan County) of Maneh County, North Khorasan province, Iran, serving as capital of the county. As a village, it was the capital of Maneh Rural District (Note: Renamed Atrak Rural District) of Maneh and Samalqan County (Note: Renamed Samalqan County) until its capital was transferred to the village of Bazareh-ye Qarnas. It was the capital of Maneh District (Note: Renamed the Central District of Maneh County) until its capital was transferred to the village of Mohammadabad. The village of Pish Qaleh was converted to a city in 2003.

== Demographics ==
=== Population ===
At the time of the 2006 National Census, the city's population was 1,631 in 465 households, when it was in Maneh District of Maneh and Samalqan County. The following census in 2011 counted 2,211 people in 612 households. The 2016 census measured the population of the city as 2,001 people in 611 households.

In 2023, the district was separated from the county in the establishment of Maneh County and renamed the Central District, with Pish Qaleh as the new county's capital.
