= Qezel Qaleh, Razavi Khorasan =

Qezel Qaleh قزل قلعه
- Village
- Location within Iran
- Coordinates: 36°44′17″N 58°17′50″E
- Country: Iran
- Province: Razavi Khorasan
- County: Nishapur
- Bakhsh: Sarvelayat
- Rural District: Sarvelayat

Population (2006)
  - Total: 361
- Time zone: UTC+3:30 (IRST)
  - Summer (DST): UTC+4:30 (IRDT)

Qezel Qaleh (Persian: قزل قلعه, also Romanized as Qezel Qal‘eh) is a village in Sarvelayat Rural District, Sarvelayat District, Nishapur County, Razavi Khorasan Province, Iran. At the 2006 census, its population was 361, in 103 families.

== Geography ==
Qezal Qala's surroundings are mountainous. This land is windy with cold nights. The road is gravel.

== Martyrs ==
- Martyr Seyyed Mohammad Mousavi Mousavi
- Martyr Ali Akbar Kashfi
- Martyr Asadullah Rezaei
- Martyr Muhammad Ali Hamidi

== Facilities ==
=== Sports ===
- Clay field football
- Clay court volleyball

=== Amenities ===
- School
- Health House
- Store
- Gardens

== Sports ==
Every year during Nowruz, the most important competitions are held. This village has only a natural grass field.

== Entertainment ==
The recreation of young people is motorcycle riding. They often ride to Kolah, a village located on a high place that overlooks the surroundings.

== Culture ==
- Imamzade Seyed Majid
- Mosque of Imam Hassan Mojtabi (AS)

== Sister villages ==
- Golbin village
- Dezg village
- Talebi village
