= Dashtak-e Meymand =

Dashtak-e Meymand دشتك ميمند
- Village
- Location within Iran
- Coordinates: 31°09′35″N 51°16′13″E
- Country: Iran
- Province: Kohgiluyeh and Boyer-Ahmad
- County: Dana
- Bakhsh: Pataveh
- Rural District: Sadat Mahmudi

Population (2006)
  - Total: 295
- Time zone: UTC+3:30 (IRST)
  - Summer (DST): UTC+4:30 (IRDT)

Dashtak-e Meymand (Persian: دشتك ميمند; also known as Dashtak-e Bālā and Dashtak-e ‘Olyā) is a village in Sadat Mahmudi Rural District, Pataveh District, Dana County, Kohgiluyeh and Boyer-Ahmad Province, Iran. At the 2006 census, its population was 295, in 67 families.
