= Dashtak, Gilan =

Dashtak دشتك
- Village
- Location within Iran
- Coordinates: 36°47′40″N 50°12′48″E
- Country: Iran
- Province: Gilan
- County: Rudsar
- Bakhsh: Rahimabad
- Rural District: Shuil

Population (2006)
  - Total: 73
- Time zone: UTC+3:30 (IRST)
  - Summer (DST): UTC+4:30 (IRDT)

Dashtak (Persian: دشتك) is a village in Shuil Rural District, Rahimabad District, Rudsar County, Gilan Province, Iran. According to 2006 census, its population was 73, in 21 families.
