= Qareh Qanlu, East Azerbaijan =

Qareh Qanlu قره قانلو
- Village
- Location within Iran
- Coordinates: 37°11′42″N 48°02′46″E
- Country: Iran
- Province: East Azerbaijan
- County: Meyaneh
- Bakhsh: Kaghazkonan
- Rural District: Kaghazkonan-e Markazi

Population (2006)
  - Total: 94
- Time zone: UTC+3:30 (IRST)
  - Summer (DST): UTC+4:30 (IRDT)

Qareh Qanlu (Persian: قره قانلو, also Romanized as Qareh Qānlū; also known as Karaganlu, Qaraghānlu, Qarah Qātlū, and Qarāqānlū) is a village in Kaghazkonan-e Markazi Rural District, Kaghazkonan District, Meyaneh County, East Azerbaijan Province, Iran. At the 2006 census, its population was 94, in 23 families.
