= Dashtak-e Olya, Fars =

Dashtak-e Olya دشتك عليا
- Village
- Location within Iran
- Coordinates: 30°20′11″N 51°30′32″E
- Country: Iran
- Province: Fars
- County: Rostam
- Bakhsh: Central
- Rural District: Rostam-e Yek

Population (2006)
  - Total: 590
- Time zone: UTC+3:30 (IRST)
  - Summer (DST): UTC+4:30 (IRDT)

Dashtak-e Olya (Persian: دشتك عليا, also Romanized as Dashtak-e 'Olyā) is a village in Rostam-e Yek Rural District, in the Central District of Rostam County, Fars province, Iran. At the 2006 census, its population was 590, in 123 families.
