= Dashtok-e Sofla, Yazd =

Dashtok-e Sofla دشتك سفلي
- Village
- Location within Iran
- Coordinates: 31°39′33″N 54°01′11″E
- Country: Iran
- Province: Yazd
- County: Taft
- Bakhsh: Central
- Rural District: Pishkuh

Population (2006)
  - Total: 31
- Time zone: UTC+3:30 (IRST)
  - Summer (DST): UTC+4:30 (IRDT)

Dashtok-e Sofla (Persian: دشتك سفلي, also Romanized as Dashtok-e Soflá and Dashtak Sofla; also known as Dashtok-e Pā’īn) is a village in Pishkuh Rural District, in the Central District of Taft County, Yazd Province, Iran. At the 2006 census, its population was 31, in 17 families.
