= Dashtak Dishmuk =

Dashtak Dishmuk دشتك ديشموك
- Village
- Location within Iran
- Coordinates: 30°39′35″N 51°11′40″E
- Country: Iran
- Province: Kohgiluyeh and Boyer-Ahmad
- County: Kohgiluyeh
- Bakhsh: Dishmok
- Rural District: Bahmayi-ye Sarhadi-ye Sharqi

Population (2006)
  - Total: 378
- Time zone: UTC+3:30 (IRST)
  - Summer (DST): UTC+4:30 (IRDT)

Dashtak Dishmuk (Persian: دشتك ديشموك, also Romanized as Dashtak Dīshmūk; also known as Dashtak) is a village in Bahmayi-ye Sarhadi-ye Sharqi Rural District, Dishmok District, Kohgiluyeh County, Kohgiluyeh and Boyer-Ahmad Province, Iran. At the 2006 census, its population was 378, in 61 families.
