= Ab Sepa =

Ab Sepa اب سپا
- Village
- Location within Iran
- Coordinates: 30°59′39″N 51°20′43″E
- Country: Iran
- Province: Kohgiluyeh and Boyer-Ahmad
- County: Dana
- Bakhsh: Pataveh
- Rural District: Pataveh

Population (2006)
  - Total: 73
- Time zone: UTC+3:30 (IRST)
  - Summer (DST): UTC+4:30 (IRDT)

Ab Sepa (Persian: اب سپا, also Romanized as Āb Sepā; also known as Dashtak) is a village in Pataveh Rural District, Pataveh District, Dana County, Kohgiluyeh and Boyer-Ahmad province, Iran. At the 2006 census, its population was 73, in 15 families.
