= Ashkhaneh =

City in North Khorasan province, Iran

Ashkhaneh Persian: آشخانه
- City
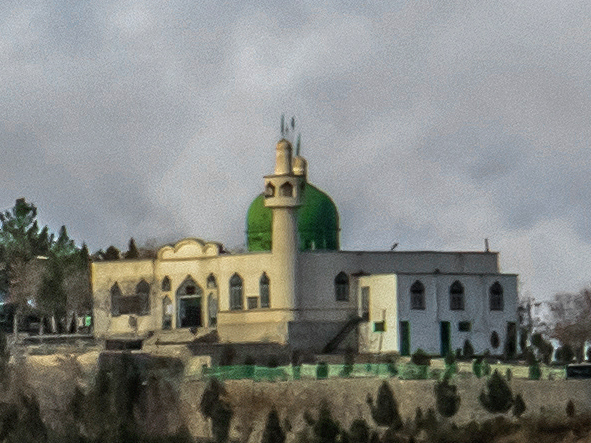
- Delavar Hill in the city of Ashkhaneh
- Nickname: The jewel of North Khorasan
- Location within Iran
- Coordinates: 37°33′28″N 56°55′33″E
- Country: Iran
- Province: North Khorasan
- County: Samalqan
- District: Central

Population (2016)
  - Total: 25,104
- Time zone: UTC+3:30 (IRST)
- Area code: 0583293

Ashkhaneh (Persian: آشخانه) (Note: Also romanized as Āshkhāneh) is a city in the Central District of Samalqan County, (Note: Formerly Maneh and Samalqan County) North Khorasan province, Iran, serving as capital of both the county and district.

== Demographics ==
=== Ethnicity ===
The majority of the population is Kurdish.

=== Population ===
At the time of the 2006 National Census, the city's population was 18,234 in 4,642 households. The following census in 2011 counted 22,877 people in 6,196 households. The 2016 census measured the population of the city as 25,104 people in 7,245 households.

== Geography ==
Based on geographical studies and the third period of geology, Samalqan is located on a gentle plain and the city of Ashkhaneh is the first entry city of North Khorasan province from the northern provinces of Iran. The city is divided into two parts by the construction of a bridge and is located on the side of the Asian road, which is about 120 km through this transit road through Samalqan County. The city has a Mediterranean climate with cold winters and hot summers. The area of Ashkhaneh city is 339 hectares.
