= Qezel Qaleh-ye Musulanlu =

Qezel Qaleh-ye Musulanlu قزل قلعه موسولانلو
- Village
- Location within Iran
- Coordinates: 36°50′57″N 46°58′41″E
- Country: Iran
- Province: East Azerbaijan
- County: Charuymaq
- Bakhsh: Central
- Rural District: Charuymaq-e Jonubegharbi

Population (2006)
  - Total: 216
- Time zone: UTC+3:30 (IRST)
  - Summer (DST): UTC+4:30 (IRDT)

Qezel Qaleh-ye Musulanlu (Persian: قزل قلعه موسولانلو, also Romanized as Qezel Qal‘eh-ye Mūsūlānlū; also known as Qezel Qal‘eh) is a village in Charuymaq-e Jonubegharbi Rural District, in the Central District of Charuymaq County, East Azerbaijan Province, Iran. At the 2006 census, its population was 216, in 38 families.
