= Qezel Qaleh-ye Kuranlu =

Qezel Qaleh-ye Kuranlu قزل قلعه كورانلو
- Village
- Location within Iran
- Coordinates: 36°52′16″N 47°14′33″E
- Country: Iran
- Province: East Azerbaijan
- County: Charuymaq
- Bakhsh: Shadian
- Rural District: Charuymaq-e Jonubesharqi

Population (2006)
  - Total: 185
- Time zone: UTC+3:30 (IRST)
  - Summer (DST): UTC+4:30 (IRDT)

Qezel Qaleh-ye Kuranlu (Persian: قزل قلعه كورانلو, also Romanized as Qezel Qal‘eh-ye Kūrānlū; also known as Qazel Qal‘eh and Qezel Qal‘eh) is a village in Charuymaq-e Jonubesharqi Rural District, Shadian District, Charuymaq County, East Azerbaijan Province, Iran. At the 2006 census, its population was 185, in 33 families.
