= Dashtak, Marvdasht =

Dashtak دشتك
- Village
- Location within Iran
- Coordinates: 30°17′24″N 52°28′11″E
- Country: Iran
- Province: Fars
- County: Marvdasht
- Bakhsh: Dorudzan
- Rural District: Dorudzan

Population (2006)
  - Total: 2,109
- Time zone: UTC+3:30 (IRST)
  - Summer (DST): UTC+4:30 (IRDT)

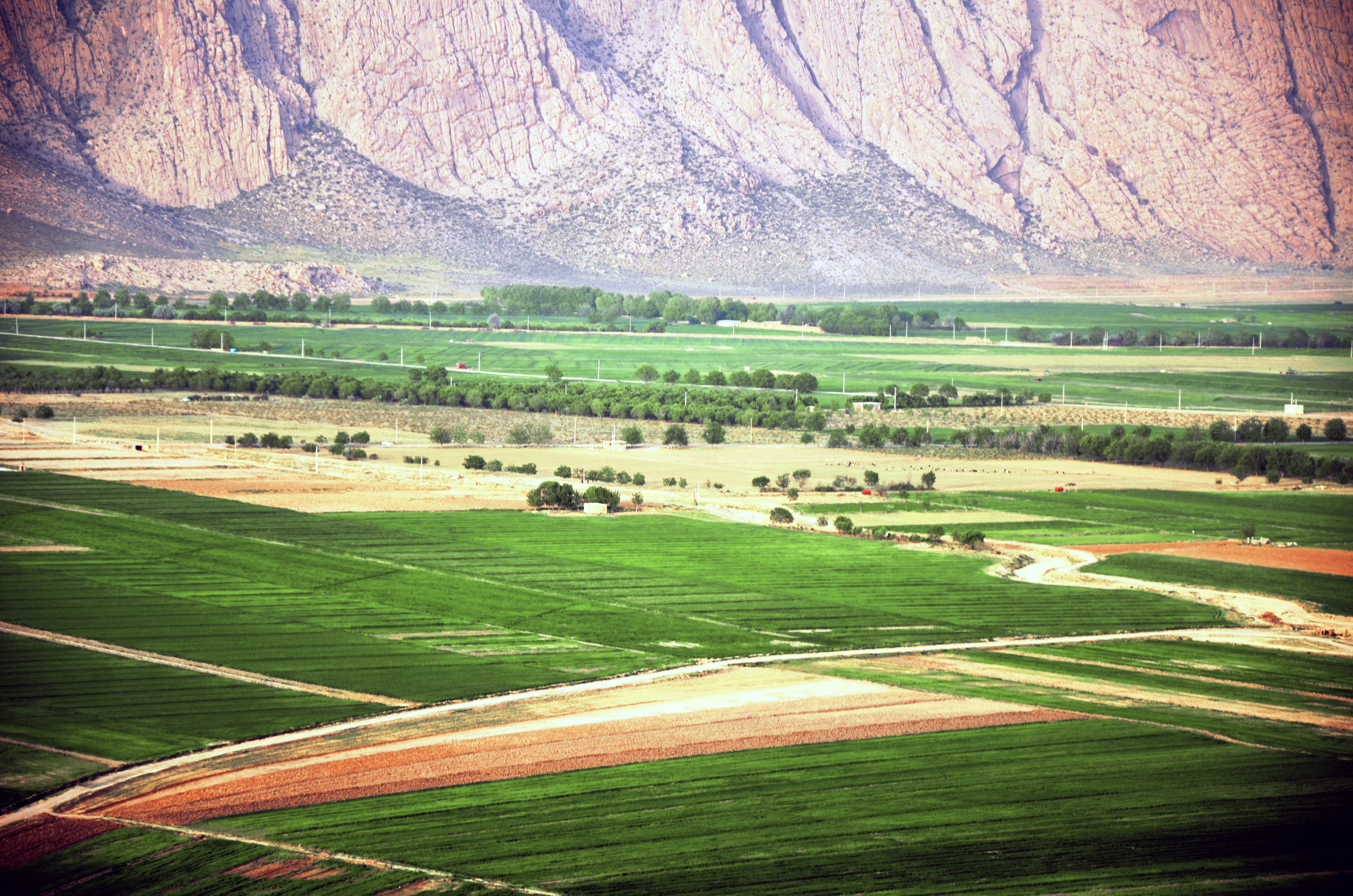
Marvdasht, Dorudzan, Dashtak

Dashtak (Persian: دشتک) is a village in the Dorudzan District, Marvdasht County, Fars province, Iran. At the 2006 census, its population was 2,109, in 542 families.
