= Dasht-e Gorgan, Khuzestan =

Dasht-e Gorgan دشت گرگان
- Village
- Country: Iran
- Province: Khuzestan
- County: Dezful
- Bakhsh: Sardasht
- Rural District: Darreh Kayad

Population (2006)
  - Total: 40
- Time zone: UTC+3:30 (IRST)
  - Summer (DST): UTC+4:30 (IRDT)

Dasht-e Gorgan (Persian: دشت گرگان, also Romanized as Dasht-e Gorgān) is a village in Darreh Kayad Rural District, Sardasht District, Dezful County, Khuzestan Province, Iran. At the 2006 census, its population was 40, in 8 families.
