= Dashtuk, South Khorasan =

Dashtuk دشتوك
- Village
- Location within Iran
- Coordinates: 33°26′33″N 57°18′27″E
- Country: Iran
- Province: South Khorasan
- County: Tabas
- Bakhsh: Deyhuk
- Rural District: Deyhuk

Population (2006)
  - Total: 58
- Time zone: UTC+3:30 (IRST)
  - Summer (DST): UTC+4:30 (IRDT)

Dashtuk (Persian: دشتوك, also Romanized as Dashtūk; also known as Dashtak) is a village in Deyhuk Rural District, Deyhuk District, Tabas County, South Khorasan Province, Iran. At the 2006 census, its population was 58, in 14 families.
