= Shirin Su Rural District (Maneh County) =

Rural district in North Khorasan province, Iran

Shirin Su Rural District Persian: دهستان شيرين سو
- Rural District
- Location within Iran
- Coordinates: 37°52′03″N 56°48′06″E
- Country: Iran
- Province: North Khorasan
- County: Maneh
- District: Shirin Su
- Established: 2001
- Capital: Kalimani

Population (2016)
  - Total: 9,618
- Time zone: UTC+3:30 (IRST)

Shirin Su Rural District (Persian: دهستان شيرين سو) is in Shirin Su District of Maneh County, North Khorasan province, Iran. Its capital is the village of Kalimani. (Note: Formerly known as Shahrak-e Kal Imani) The previous capital of the rural district was the village of Khartut.

== Demographics ==
=== Population ===
At the time of the 2006 National Census, the rural district's population (as a part of Maneh District (Note: Renamed the Central District of Maneh County) in Maneh and Samalqan County (Note: Renamed Samalqan County)) was 7,761 in 1,635 households. There were 8,819 inhabitants in 2,021 households at the following census of 2011. The 2016 census measured the population of the rural district as 9,618 in 2,241 households. The most populous of its 29 villages was Kohneh Jolgeh (now in Kohneh Jolgeh Rural District), with 2,010 people.

In 2023, the district was separated from the county in the establishment of Maneh County and renamed the Central District. The rural district was transferred to the new Shirin Su District.

=== Other villages in the rural district ===
- Baranabad
- Chahal Gazer
- Chahar Bagh
- Chaqan
- Hajji Gholamreza
- Hamzak
- Hasanabad
- Kalateh-ye Fathallah
- Kalateh-ye Mirza Abbas
- Kalateh-ye Sufizadeh
- Kuh Qaleh
- Mohammad Avaz
- Mohammad Baradi
- Qezel Qaleh-ye Bala
- Qezel Qaleh-ye Pain
- Rustai Hajj Hoseyn
- Tarjali
- Yomuq
