= Atrak Rural District (Maneh County) =

Rural district in North Khorasan province, Iran

Atrak Rural District Persian: دهستان اترك
- Rural District
- Location within Iran
- Coordinates: 37°39′47″N 57°04′24″E
- Country: Iran
- Province: North Khorasan
- County: Maneh
- District: Central
- Established: 1987
- Capital: Bazareh-ye Qarnas

Population (2016)
  - Total: 14,463
- Time zone: UTC+3:30 (IRST)

Atrak Rural District (Persian: دهستان اترك) (Note: Formerly Maneh Rural District (دهستان مانه)) is in the Central District (Note: Formerly Maneh District of Maneh and Samalqan County) of Maneh County, North Khorasan province, Iran. Its capital is the village of Bazareh-ye Qarnas. The previous capital of the rural district was the village of Pish Qaleh, now a city.

== Demographics ==
=== Population ===
At the time of the 2006 National Census, the rural district's population (as a part of Maneh District (Note: Renamed the Central District of Maneh County) in Maneh and Samalqan County (Note: Renamed Samalqan County)) was 17,067 in 4,173 households. There were 15,431 inhabitants in 4,326 households at the following census of 2011. The 2016 census measured the population of the rural district as 14,463 in 4,366 households. The most populous of its 48 villages was Mohammadabad, with 2,267 people.

In 2023, the district was separated from the county in the establishment of Maneh County and renamed the Central District.

=== Other villages in the rural district ===
- Aghjeh
- Aliabad-e Qarah Chay
- Arnaveh
- Barbar Qaleh
- Chupli Tappeh
- Esfidan
- Eslamabad
- Gugul
- Injanlu
- Kalateh-ye Anamusi
- Kalayen
- Kashkabad
- Kikanlu
- Pusitn Duz
- Qalandar Tappeh
- Qaleh Ostad
- Qarah Chay
- Rahim Dad
- Takht-e Mish
- Tazeh Qaleh
- Tup Chenar
- Yalanchi
