= Central District (Samalqan County) =

District in North Khorasan province, Iran

Central District (Samalqan County) Persian: بخش مرکزی شهرستان سملقان
- District
- Location within Iran
- Coordinates: 37°40′12″N 56°31′12″E
- Country: Iran
- Province: North Khorasan
- County: Samalqan
- Established: 2001
- Capital: Ashkhaneh

Population (2016)
  - Total: 53,110
- Time zone: UTC+3:30 (IRST)

The Central District of Samalqan County (Note: Formerly Maneh and Samalqan County) (Persian: بخش مرکزی شهرستان سملقان) is in North Khorasan province, Iran. Its capital is the city of Ashkhaneh.

== Demographics ==
=== Population ===
At the time of the 2006 National Census, the district's population was 44,804 in 11,301 households. The following census in 2011 counted 53,563 people in 3,659 households. The 2016 census measured the population of the district as 53,110 inhabitants in 15,350 households.

=== Administrative divisions ===
Central District (Samalqan County) Population
Administrative Divisions	2006	2011	2016
Howmeh RD	15,676	16,718	14,725
Jeyransu RD	10,894	13,968	13,281
Ashkhaneh (city)	18,234	22,877	25,104
Total	44,804	53,563	53,110
RD = Rural District
