= Shirin Su District (Maneh County) =

District in North Khorasan province, Iran

Shirin Su District Persian: بخش شیرین‌سو
- District
- Location within Iran
- Coordinates: 37°58′48″N 56°36′36″E
- Country: Iran
- Province: North Khorasan
- County: Maneh
- Established: 2023
- Capital: Khartut
- Time zone: UTC+3:30 (IRST)

Shirin Su District (Persian: بخش شیرین‌سو) is in Maneh County, North Khorasan province, Iran. Its capital is the village of Khartut, whose population at the time of the 2016 National Census was 703 in 164 households.

== History ==
In 2023, Maneh District (Note: Renamed the Central District of Maneh County) was separated from Maneh and Samalqan County (Note: Renamed Samalqan County) in the establishment of Maneh County and renamed the Central District. The new county was divided into two districts of two rural districts each, with Pish Qaleh as its capital and only city at the time.

== Demographics ==
=== Administrative divisions ===
Shirin Su District
Administrative Divisions
Kohneh Jolgeh RD
Shirin Su RD
RD = Rural District
