= Maneh County =

County in North Khorasan province, Iran

Maneh County Persian: شهرستان مانه
- County
- Location of Maneh County in North Khorasan province (top, yellow)

- Location of North Khorasan province in Iran
- Coordinates: 37°52′48″N 56°47′24″E
- Country: Iran
- Province: North Khorasan
- Established: 2023
- Capital: Pish Qaleh
- Districts: Central, Shirin Su
- Time zone: UTC+3:30 (IRST)

Maneh County (Persian: شهرستان مانه) is in North Khorasan province, Iran. Its capital is the city of Pish Qaleh, whose population at the time of the 2016 National Census was 2,001 people in 611 households.

== History ==
In 2023, Maneh District (Note: Renamed the Central District of Maneh County) was separated from Maneh and Samalqan County (Note: Renamed Samalqan County) in the establishment of Maneh County and renamed the Central District. The new county was divided into two districts of two rural districts each, with Pish Qaleh as its capital and only city at the time.

== Demographics ==
=== Administrative divisions ===
Maneh County's administrative structure is shown in the following table.

Maneh County
Administrative Divisions
Central District (Note: Formerly Maneh District of Maneh and Samalqan County)
Atrak RD (Note: Formerly Maneh Rural District)
Eshqabad RD
Pish Qaleh (city)
Shirin Su District
Kohneh Jolgeh RD
Shirin Su RD
RD = Rural District

== See also ==
Media related to Maneh County at Wikimedia Commons
