= Central District (Maneh County) =

District in North Khorasan province, Iran

Central District (Maneh County) Persian: بخش مرکزی شهرستان مانه
- District
- Location within Iran
- Coordinates: 37°45′00″N 56°53′24″E
- Country: Iran
- Province: North Khorasan
- County: Maneh
- Established: 2001
- Capital: Mohammadabad

Population (2016)
  - Total: 26,082 (Note: As Maneh District of Maneh and Samalqan County)
- Time zone: UTC+3:30 (IRST)

The Central District of Maneh County (Persian: بخش مرکزی شهرستان مانه) (Note: Formerly Maneh District (بخش مانه) of Maneh and Samalqan County) is in North Khorasan province, Iran. Its capital is the village of Mohammadabad. The previous capital of the district was the city of Pish Qaleh.

== History ==
In 2023, Maneh District (Note: Renamed the Central District of Maneh County) was separated from Maneh and Samalqan County (Note: Renamed Samalqan County) in the establishment of Maneh County and renamed the Central District. The new county was divided into two districts of two rural districts each, with Pish Qaleh as its capital and only city at the time.

== Demographics ==
=== Population ===
At the time of the 2006 National Census, the district's population (as Maneh District of Maneh and Samalqan County) was 26,459 in 6,273 households. The following census in 2011 counted 26,461 people in 6,959 households. The 2016 census measured the population of the district as 26,082 inhabitants in 7,218 households.

=== Administrative divisions ===
Central District (Maneh County) (Note: As Maneh District of Samalqan County at the 2006, 2011, and 2016 censuses)
Administrative Divisions	2006	2011	2016
Atrak RD (Note: Formerly Maneh Rural District)	17,067	15,431	14,463
Eshqabad RD (Note: Established after the 2016 census)			
Shirin Su RD (Note: Transferred to Shirin Su District)	7,761	8,819	9,618
Pish Qaleh (city)	1,631	2,211	2,001
Total	26,459	26,461	26,082
RD = Rural District
