= Samalqan County =

County in North Khorasan province, Iran

Samalqan County Persian: شهرستان سملقان
- County
- Location of Samalqan County in North Khorasan province (left, pink)

- Location of North Khorasan province in Iran
- Coordinates: 37°34′N 56°20′E
- Country: Iran
- Province: North Khorasan
- Established: 2001
- Capital: Ashkhaneh
- Districts: Central, Samalqan

Population (2016)
  - Total: 101,727
- Time zone: UTC+3:30 (IRST)

Samalqan County (Persian: شهرستان سملقان) (Note: Formerly Maneh and Samalqan County (شهرستان مانه و سملقان تایباد), also romanized as Maneh va Samalqan; also known as Mana and Samangan County) is in North Khorasan province, Iran. Its capital is the city of Ashkhaneh.

== History ==
In 2013, two villages merged to form the new city of Ava. In 2023, Maneh District (Note: Renamed the Central District of Maneh County) was separated from the county in the establishment of Maneh County and renamed the Central District. In addition, the name of Maneh and Samalqan County was changed to Samalqan County.

== Demographics ==
=== Population ===
At the time of the 2006 National Census, the population, as Maneh and Samalqan County, was 91,884 in 23,040 households. The following census in 2011 counted 103,944 people in 28,261 households. The 2016 census measured the population of the county as 101,727 in 29,624 households.

=== Administrative divisions ===
Samalqan County's population history and administrative structure over three consecutive censuses are shown in the following table.

Samalqan County Population (Note: As Maneh and Samalqan County at the 2006, 2011, and 2016 censuses)
| Administrative Divisions | 2006 | 2011 | 2016 |
|---|---|---|---|
| Central District | 44,804 | 53,563 | 53,110 |
| Howmeh RD | 15,676 | 16,718 | 14,725 |
| Jeyransu RD | 10,894 | 13,968 | 13,281 |
| Ashkhaneh (city) | 18,234 | 22,877 | 25,104 |
| Maneh District (Note: Transferred to Maneh County after the 2016 census and renamed the Central District) | 26,459 | 26,461 | 26,082 |
| Atrak RD (Note: Formerly Maneh Rural District) | 17,067 | 15,431 | 14,463 |
| Shirin Su RD | 7,761 | 8,819 | 9,618 |
| Pish Qaleh (city) | 1,631 | 2,211 | 2,001 |
| Samalqan District | 20,621 | 22,335 | 21,378 |
| Almeh RD | 7,517 | 7,866 | 7,788 |
| Qazi RD (Note: Formerly Samalqan Rural District) | 10,734 | 11,513 | 7,169 |
| Ava (city) (Note: Merger of two villages) | | | 3,993 |
| Qazi (city) | 2,370 | 2,956 | 2,428 |
| Total | 91,884 | 103,944 | 101,727 |
RD = Rural District

== See also ==
Media related to Samalqan County at Wikimedia Commons
