= Sangsar =

Village in North Khorasan province, Iran

Sangsar Persian: سنگسار
- Village
- Location within Iran
- Coordinates: 38°12′40″N 56°58′18″E
- Country: Iran
- Province: North Khorasan
- County: Raz and Jargalan
- District: Central
- Rural District: Baghleq

Population (2016)
  - Total: 524
- Time zone: UTC+3:30 (IRST)

Sangsar (Persian: سنگسار) (Note: Also romanized as Sangsār) is a village in Baghleq Rural District of the Central District in Raz and Jargalan County, North Khorasan province, Iran.

== Demographics ==
=== Population ===
At the time of the 2006 National Census, the village's population was 534 in 117 households, when it was in Gholaman Rural District of the former Raz and Jargalan District in Bojnord County. The following census in 2011 counted 584 people in 140 households. The 2016 census measured the population of the village as 524 people in 137 households, by which time the district had been separated from the county in the establishment of Raz and Jargalan County. The rural district was transferred to the new Gholaman District, and the village was transferred to Baghleq Rural District created in the new Central District.
