= Ashraf Darreh =

Village in North Khorasan province, Iran

Ashraf Darreh Persian: اشرف دره
- Village
- Location within Iran
- Coordinates: 38°10′48″N 56°56′41″E
- Country: Iran
- Province: North Khorasan
- County: Raz and Jargalan
- District: Central
- Rural District: Baghleq

Population (2016)
  - Total: 1,244
- Time zone: UTC+3:30 (IRST)

Ashraf Darreh (Persian: اشرف دره) (Note: Also known as Ashrafdāl) is a village in Baghleq Rural District of the Central District in Raz and Jargalan County, North Khorasan province, Iran.

== Demographics ==
=== Population ===
At the time of the 2006 National Census, the village's population was 1,265 in 294 households, when it was in Gholaman Rural District of the former Raz and Jargalan District in Bojnord County. The following census in 2011 counted 1,390 people in 339 households. The 2016 census measured the population of the village as 1,244 people in 328 households, by which time the district had been separated from the county in the establishment of Raz and Jargalan County. The rural district was transferred to the new Gholaman District, and the village was transferred to Baghleq Rural District created in the new Central District.
