= Gaz, North Khorasan =

Village in North Khorasan province, Iran

Gaz Persian: گز
- Village
- Location within Iran
- Coordinates: 38°07′47″N 56°49′48″E
- Country: Iran
- Province: North Khorasan
- County: Raz and Jargalan
- District: Central
- Rural District: Baghleq

Population (2016)
  - Total: 906
- Time zone: UTC+3:30 (IRST)

Gaz (Persian: گز) is a village in Baghleq Rural District of the Central District in Raz and Jargalan County, North Khorasan province, Iran.

== Demographics ==
=== Population ===
At the time of the 2006 National Census, the village's population was 1,217 in 242 households, when it was in Jargalan Rural District of the former Raz and Jargalan District in Bojnord County. The following census in 2011 counted 1,089 people in 283 households. The 2016 census measured the population of the village as 906 people in 245 households, by which time the district had been separated from the county in the establishment of Raz and Jargalan County. The rural district was transferred to the new Central District, and the village was transferred to Baghleq Rural District created in the same district.
