= Bacheh Darreh =

Village in North Khorasan province, Iran

Bacheh Darreh Persian: بچه دره
- Village
- Location within Iran
- Coordinates: 38°10′37″N 56°26′20″E
- Country: Iran
- Province: North Khorasan
- County: Raz and Jargalan
- District: Jargalan
- Rural District: Hesarcheh

Population (2016)
  - Total: 1,776
- Time zone: UTC+3:30 (IRST)

Bacheh Darreh (Persian: بچه دره) (Note: Also known as Bacheh Darreh-ye Soflá, Bāgh-e Darreh-ye Soflá, Bāsh Darreh, and Besh Darreh) is a village in Hesarcheh Rural District of Jargalan District in Raz and Jargalan County, North Khorasan province, Iran.

== Demographics ==
=== Population ===
At the time of the 2006 National Census, the village's population was 1,621 in 423 households, when it was in Jargalan Rural District of the former Raz and Jargalan District in Bojnord County. The following census in 2011 counted 1,735 people in 431 households. The 2016 census measured the population of the village as 1,776 people in 449 households, by which time the district had been separated from the county in the establishment of Raz and Jargalan County. The rural district was transferred to the new Jargalan District, and the village was transferred to Hesarcheh Rural District created in the same district. Bacheh Darreh was the most populous village in its rural district.
