= Hesarcheh-ye Bala =

Village in North Khorasan province, Iran

Hesarcheh-ye Bala Persian: حصارچه بالا
- Village
- Location within Iran
- Coordinates: 38°11′28″N 56°29′31″E
- Country: Iran
- Province: North Khorasan
- County: Raz and Jargalan
- District: Jargalan
- Rural District: Hesarcheh

Population (2016)
  - Total: 913
- Time zone: UTC+3:30 (IRST)

Hesarcheh-ye Bala (Persian: حصارچه بالا) (Note: Also romanized as Ḩeşārcheh-ye Bālā; formerly known as Hesarcheh (حصارچه), also romanized as Ḩeşārcheh) is a village in, and the capital of, Hesarcheh Rural District in Jargalan District of Raz and Jargalan County, North Khorasan province, Iran.

== Demographics ==
=== Population ===
At the time of the 2006 National Census, the village's population, as Hesarcheh, was 831 in 197 households, when it was in Jargalan Rural District of the former Raz and Jargalan District in Bojnord County. The following census in 2011 counted 919 people in 260 households. The 2016 census measured the population of the village as 913 people in 231 households, by which time the district had been separated from the county in the establishment of Raz and Jargalan County. The rural district was transferred to the new Jargalan District, and the village was transferred to Hesarcheh Rural District created in the same district. Hesarcheh was relisted as Hesarcheh-ye Bala.
