= Taklah Quz =

Village in North Khorasan province, Iran

Taklah Quz Persian: تكله قوز
- Village
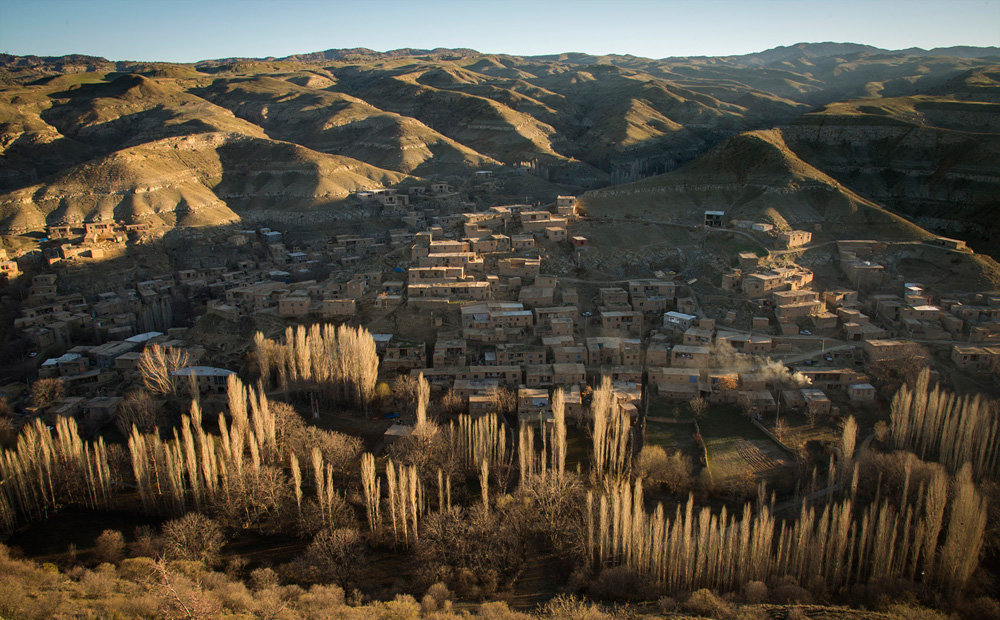
- The village of Taklah Quz

- Location within Iran
- Coordinates: 38°13′22″N 57°08′12″E
- Country: Iran
- Province: North Khorasan
- County: Raz and Jargalan
- District: Gholaman
- Rural District: Rasteqan

Population (2016)
  - Total: 963
- Time zone: UTC+3:30 (IRST)

Taklah Quz (Persian: تكله قوز) (Note: Also romanized as Takaleh Qūz and Taklah Qūz; also known as Taklak Qūz and Taklek Qūz) is a village in Rasteqan Rural District of Gholaman District in Raz and Jargalan County, North Khorasan province, Iran.

== Demographics ==
=== Population ===
At the time of the 2006 National Census, the village's population was 859 in 204 households, when it was in Gholaman Rural District of the former Raz and Jargalan District in Bojnord County. The following census in 2011 counted 908 people in 253 households. The 2016 census measured the population of the village as 963 people in 276 households, by which time the district had been separated from the county in the establishment of Raz and Jargalan County. The rural district was transferred to the new Gholaman District, and the village was transferred to Rasteqan Rural District created in the same district.
