= Seyu Khosu Hashem =

Village in North Khorasan province, Iran

Seyu Khosu Hashem Persian: سيو خسو هاشم
- Village
- Location within Iran
- Coordinates: 38°08′10″N 57°04′44″E
- Country: Iran
- Province: North Khorasan
- County: Raz and Jargalan
- District: Gholaman
- Rural District: Rasteqan

Population (2016)
  - Total: 1,441
- Time zone: UTC+3:30 (IRST)

Seyu Khosu Hashem (Persian: سيو خسو هاشم) (Note: Also known as Seyu Khosavi Hashem, Seyū Khosavī Hāshem, So’ūkhsū Hāshem, and Soyūkhsū Hāshem) is a village in Rasteqan Rural District of Gholaman District in Raz and Jargalan County, North Khorasan province, Iran.

== Demographics ==
=== Population ===
At the time of the 2006 National Census, the village's population was 1,359 in 286 households, when it was in Gholaman Rural District of the former Raz and Jargalan District in Bojnord County. The following census in 2011 counted 1,540 people in 390 households. The 2016 census measured the population of the village as 1,441 people in 393 households, by which time the district had been separated from the county in the establishment of Raz and Jargalan County. The rural district was transferred to the new Gholaman District, and the village was transferred to Rasteqan Rural District created in the same district. Seyu Khosu Hashem was the most populous village in its rural district.
