= Hasanabad, Raz and Jargalan =

Neighborhood in North Khorasan province, Iran

Hasanabad Persian: حسن اباد
- Neighborhood
- Location within Iran
- Coordinates: 38°10′48″N 56°41′57″E
- Country: Iran
- Province: North Khorasan
- County: Raz and Jargalan
- District: Jargalan
- Rural District: Jargalan
- Village: Yekkeh Soud

Population (2016)
  - Total: 577
- Time zone: UTC+3:30 (IRST)

Hasanabad (Persian: حسن اباد) (Note: Also romanized as Ḩasanābād) is a neighborhood in the village of Yekkeh Soud in Jargalan Rural District of Jargalan District in Raz and Jargalan County, North Khorasan province, Iran.

== Demographics ==
=== Population ===
At the time of the 2006 National Census, Hasanabad's population was 290 in 66 households, when it was a village in Jargalan Rural District of the former Raz and Jargalan District in Bojnord County. The following census in 2011 counted 363 people in 87 households. The 2016 census measured the population of the village as 577 people in 150 households, by which time the district had been separated from the county in the establishment of Raz and Jargalan County. The rural district was transferred to the new Jargalan District.

In 2019, Yekkeh Soud-e Sofla merged with the villages of Hasanabad and Yekkeh Soud-e Olya to become the village of Yekkeh Soud.
