= Qareh Bater =

Village in North Khorasan province, Iran

Qareh Bater Persian: قره باطر
- Village
- Location within Iran
- Coordinates: 38°14′05″N 57°11′55″E
- Country: Iran
- Province: North Khorasan
- County: Raz and Jargalan
- District: Gholaman
- Rural District: Rasteqan

Population (2016)
  - Total: 164
- Time zone: UTC+3:30 (IRST)

Qareh Bater (Persian: قره‌باطر) (Note: Also romanized as Qareh Bāţer) is a village in Rasteqan Rural District of Gholaman District in Raz and Jargalan County, North Khorasan province, Iran.

== Demographics ==
=== Population ===
At the time of the 2006 National Census, the village's population was 144 in 33 households, when it was in Gholaman Rural District of the former Raz and Jargalan District in Bojnord County. The following census in 2011 counted 166 people in 37 households. The 2016 census measured the population of the village as 164 people in 50 households, by which time the district had been separated from the county in the establishment of Raz and Jargalan County. The rural district was transferred to the new Gholaman District, and the village was transferred to Rasteqan Rural District created in the same district.
