= Kilu Panjeh =

Village in North Khorasan province, Iran

Kilu Panjeh Persian: كيلوپنجه
- Village
- Location within Iran
- Coordinates: 38°11′22″N 56°32′01″E
- Country: Iran
- Province: North Khorasan
- County: Raz and Jargalan
- District: Jargalan
- Rural District: Hesarcheh

Population (2016)
  - Total: 595
- Time zone: UTC+3:30 (IRST)

Kilu Panjeh (Persian: كيلوپنجه) (Note: Also romanized as Kīlū Panjeh and Kīlū Ponjeh) is a village in Hesarcheh Rural District of Jargalan District in Raz and Jargalan County, North Khorasan province, Iran.

== Demographics ==
=== Population ===
At the time of the 2006 National Census, the village's population was 463 in 109 households, when it was in Jargalan Rural District of the former Raz and Jargalan District in Bojnord County. The following census in 2011 counted 586 people in 141 households. The 2016 census measured the population of the village as 595 people in 147 households, by which time the district had been separated from the county in the establishment of Raz and Jargalan County. The rural district was transferred to the new Jargalan District, and the village was transferred to Hesarcheh Rural District created in the same district.
