= Seyu Khosu Anqolab =

Village in North Khorasan province, Iran

Seyu Khosu Anqolab Persian: سيوخسوانقلاب
- Village
- Location within Iran
- Coordinates: 38°09′42″N 57°12′02″E
- Country: Iran
- Province: North Khorasan
- County: Raz and Jargalan
- District: Gholaman
- Rural District: Rasteqan

Population (2016)
  - Total: 630
- Time zone: UTC+3:30 (IRST)

Seyu Khosu Anqolab (Persian: سيوخسوانقلاب) (Note: Also romanized as Seyū Khosū Ānqolāb; also known as Seyu Khosavi Anqolab, Seyū Khosavī Ānqolāb, Seyū Khosavī Morādkhān, Seyū Khosū Morādkhān (سيوخسومرادخان), and So’ūkhsū-ye Morādkhān) is a village in Rasteqan Rural District of Gholaman District in Raz and Jargalan County, North Khorasan province, Iran.

== Demographics ==
=== Population ===
At the time of the 2006 National Census, the village's population was 633 in 147 households, when it was in Gholaman Rural District of the former Raz and Jargalan District in Bojnord County. The following census in 2011 counted 633 people in 199 households. The 2016 census measured the population of the village as 630 people in 200 households, by which time the district had been separated from the county in the establishment of Raz and Jargalan County. The rural district was transferred to the new Gholaman District, and the village was transferred to Rasteqan Rural District created in the same district.
