= Baghleq =

Village in North Khorasan province, Iran

Baghleq Persian: باغلق
- Village
- Location within Iran
- Coordinates: 38°04′56″N 56°56′35″E
- Country: Iran
- Province: North Khorasan
- County: Raz and Jargalan
- District: Central
- Rural District: Baghleq

Population (2016)
  - Total: 2,131
- Time zone: UTC+3:30 (IRST)

Baghleq (Persian: باغلق) (Note: Also romanized as Bāghleq; also known as Bāqlaq and Bāqleq) is a village in, and the capital of, Baghleq Rural District in the Central District of Raz and Jargalan County, North Khorasan province, Iran.

== Demographics ==
=== Population ===
At the time of the 2006 National Census, the village's population was 1,924 in 403 households, when it was in Jargalan Rural District of the former Raz and Jargalan District in Bojnord County. The following census in 2011 counted 2,250 people in 531 households. The 2016 census measured the population of the village as 2,131 people in 534 households, by which time the district had been separated from the county in the establishment of Raz and Jargalan County. The rural district was transferred to the new Central District, and Baghleq was transferred to Baghleq Rural District created in the same district.
