= Kalateh-ye Hasan Qoli =

Village in North Khorasan province, Iran

Kalateh-ye Hasan Qoli Persian: كلاته حسنقلي
- Village
- Location within Iran
- Coordinates: 38°09′04″N 57°08′52″E
- Country: Iran
- Province: North Khorasan
- County: Raz and Jargalan
- District: Gholaman
- Rural District: Rasteqan

Population (2016)
  - Total: 397
- Time zone: UTC+3:30 (IRST)

Kalateh-ye Hasan Qoli (Persian: كلاته حسنقلي) (Note: Also romanized as Kalāteh-ye Ḩasan Qolī) is a village in Rasteqan Rural District of Gholaman District in Raz and Jargalan County, North Khorasan province, Iran.

== Demographics ==
=== Population ===
At the time of the 2006 National Census, the village's population was 512 in 122 households, when it was in Gholaman Rural District of the former Raz and Jargalan District in Bojnord County. The following census in 2011 counted 465 people in 123 households. The 2016 census measured the population of the village as 397 people in 126 households, by which time the district had been separated from the county in the establishment of Raz and Jargalan County. The rural district was transferred to the new Gholaman District, and the village was transferred to Rasteqan Rural District created in the same district.
