= Mazraeh-ye Bacheh Darreh-ye Olya =

Village in North Khorasan province, Iran

Mazraeh-ye Bacheh Darreh-ye Olya Persian: مزرعه بچه دره عليا
- Village
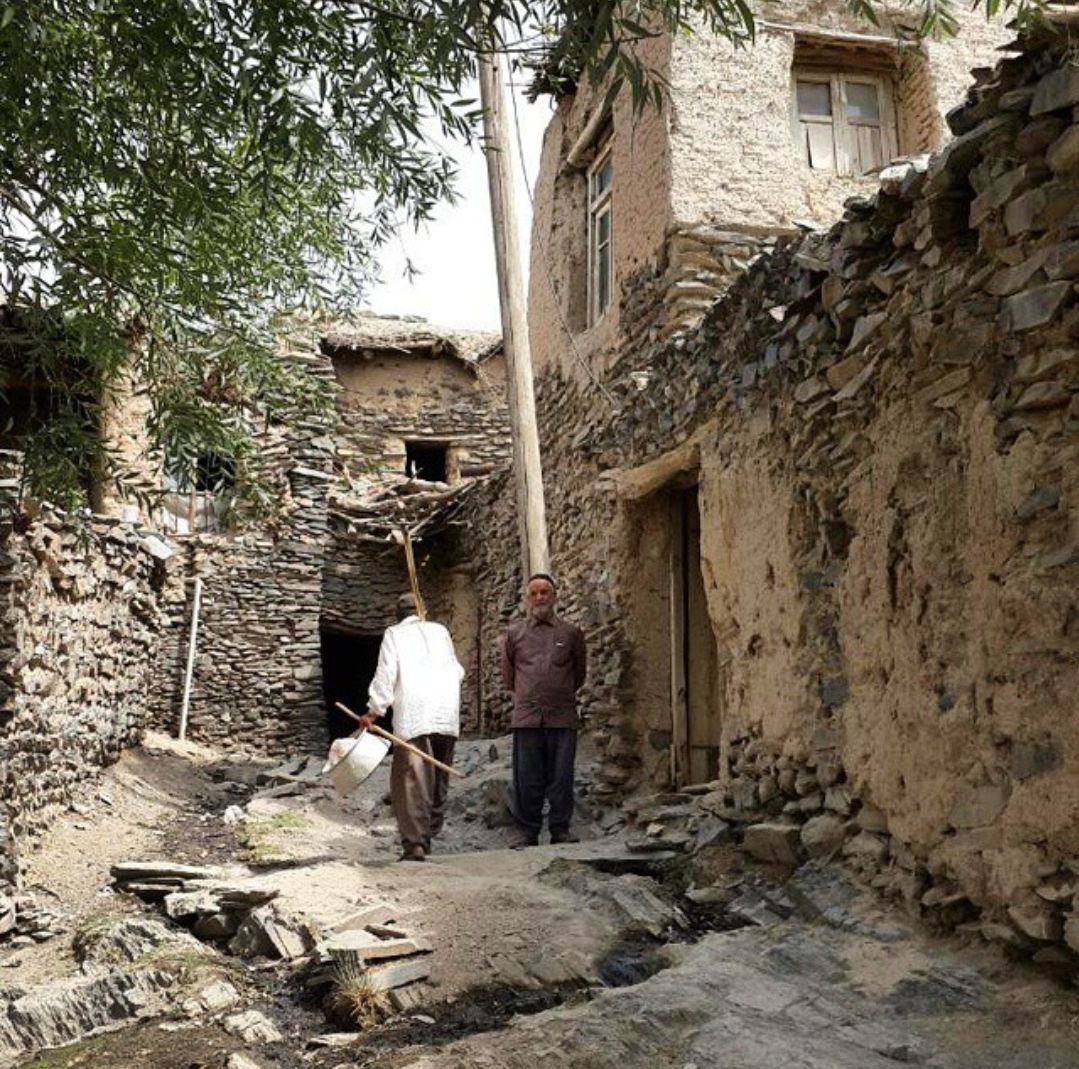
- The village of Mazraeh-ye Bacheh Darreh-ye Olya
- Country: Iran
- Province: North Khorasan
- County: Raz and Jargalan
- District: Jargalan
- Rural District: Hesarcheh

Population (2016)
  - Total: 385
- Time zone: UTC+3:30 (IRST)

Mazraeh-ye Bacheh Darreh-ye Olya (Persian: مزرعه بچه دره عليا) (Note: Also romanized as Mazra‘eh-ye Bacheh Darreh-ye ‘Olyā) is a village in Hesarcheh Rural District of Jargalan District in Raz and Jargalan County, North Khorasan province, Iran.

== Demographics ==
=== Population ===
At the time of the 2006 National Census, the village's population was 160 in 55 households, when it was in Jargalan Rural District of the former Raz and Jargalan District in Bojnord County. The following census in 2011 counted 198 people in 48 households. The 2016 census measured the population of the village as 385 people in 102 households, by which time the district had been separated from the county in the establishment of Raz and Jargalan County. The rural district was transferred to the new Jargalan District, and the village was transferred to Hesarcheh Rural District created in the same district.
