= Hesarcheh-ye Pain =

Village in North Khorasan province, Iran

Hesarcheh-ye Pain Persian: حصارچه پائين
- Village
- Location within Iran
- Coordinates: 38°11′02″N 56°28′32″E
- Country: Iran
- Province: North Khorasan
- County: Raz and Jargalan
- District: Jargalan
- Rural District: Hesarcheh

Population (2016)
  - Total: 607
- Time zone: UTC+3:30 (IRST)

Hesarcheh-ye Pain (Persian: حصارچه پائين) (Note: Also romanized as Ḩeşārcheh-ye Pā’īn; also known as Ḩeşārcheh) is a village in Hesarcheh Rural District of Jargalan District in Raz and Jargalan County, North Khorasan province, Iran.

== Demographics ==
=== Population ===
At the time of the 2006 National Census, the village's population was 472 in 108 households, when it was in Jargalan Rural District of the former Raz and Jargalan District in Bojnord County. The following census in 2011 counted 483 people in 123 households. The 2016 census measured the population of the village as 607 people in 165 households, by which time the district had been separated from the county in the establishment of Raz and Jargalan County. The rural district was transferred to the new Jargalan District, and the village was transferred to Hesarcheh Rural District created in the same district.
