= Kariz, Raz and Jargalan =

Village in North Khorasan province, Iran

Kariz Persian: كاريز
- Village
- Location within Iran
- Coordinates: 38°11′51″N 56°51′35″E
- Country: Iran
- Province: North Khorasan
- County: Raz and Jargalan
- District: Central
- Rural District: Baghleq

Population (2016)
  - Total: 976
- Time zone: UTC+3:30 (IRST)

Kariz (Persian: كاريز) (Note: Also romanized as Kārīz) is a village in Baghleq Rural District of the Central District in Raz and Jargalan County, North Khorasan province, Iran.

== Demographics ==
=== Population ===
At the time of the 2006 National Census, the village's population was 1,013 in 226 households, when it was in Jargalan Rural District of the former Raz and Jargalan District in Bojnord County. The following census in 2011 counted 1,009 people in 240 households. The 2016 census measured the population of the village as 976 people in 231 households, by which time the district had been separated from the county in the establishment of Raz and Jargalan County. The rural district was transferred to the new Central District, and the village was transferred to Baghleq Rural District created in the same district.
