= Tash Nafas =

Village in North Khorasan province, Iran

Tash Nafas Persian: گزتش نفس
- Village
- Location within Iran
- Coordinates: 38°05′14″N 56°53′23″E
- Country: Iran
- Province: North Khorasan
- County: Raz and Jargalan
- District: Central
- Rural District: Baghleq

Population (2016)
  - Total: 98
- Time zone: UTC+3:30 (IRST)

Tash Nafas (Persian: تش نفس) is a village in Baghleq Rural District of the Central District in Raz and Jargalan County, North Khorasan province, Iran.

== Demographics ==
=== Population ===
At the time of the 2006 National Census, the village's population was 142 in 32 households, when it was in Jargalan Rural District of the former Raz and Jargalan District in Bojnord County. The following census in 2011 counted 125 people in 33 households. The 2016 census measured the population of the village as 98 people in 28 households, by which time the district had been separated from the county in the establishment of Raz and Jargalan County. The rural district was transferred to the new Central District, and the village was transferred to Baghleq Rural District created in the same district.
