= Rasteqan =

Village in North Khorasan province, Iran

Rasteqan Persian: راستقان
- Village
- Location within Iran
- Coordinates: 38°10′24″N 57°09′54″E
- Country: Iran
- Province: North Khorasan
- County: Raz and Jargalan
- District: Gholaman
- Rural District: Rasteqan

Population (2016)
  - Total: 922
- Time zone: UTC+3:30 (IRST)

Rasteqan (Persian: راستقان) (Note: Also romanized as Rāsteqān) is a village in, and the capital of, Rasteqan Rural District in Gholaman District of Raz and Jargalan County, North Khorasan province, Iran.

== Demographics ==
=== Population ===
At the time of the 2006 National Census, the village's population was 1,073 in 253 households, when it was in Gholaman Rural District of the former Raz and Jargalan District in Bojnord County. The following census in 2011 counted 840 people in 249 households. The 2016 census measured the population of the village as 922 people in 312 households, by which time the district had been separated from the county in the establishment of Raz and Jargalan County. The rural district was transferred to the new Gholaman District, and Rasteqan was transferred to Rasteqan Rural District created in the same district.
