= Beyk Pulad =

Village in North Khorasan province, Iran

Beyk Pulad Persian: بیک پولاد
- Village
- Location within Iran
- Coordinates: 38°06′19″N 56°52′19″E
- Country: Iran
- Province: North Khorasan
- County: Raz and Jargalan
- District: Central
- Rural District: Baghleq

Population (2016)
  - Total: 2,774
- Time zone: UTC+3:30 (IRST)

Beyk Pulad (Persian: بیک پولاد) (Note: Also romanized as Beyk Pūlād; also known as Bak Pūlād (بک پولاد) and Beyg Pūlād) is a village in Baghleq Rural District of the Central District in Raz and Jargalan County, North Khorasan province, Iran.

== Demographics ==
=== Population ===
At the time of the 2006 National Census, the village's population was 2,441 in 515 households, when it was in Jargalan Rural District of the former Raz and Jargalan District in Bojnord County. The following census in 2011 counted 2,584 people in 614 households. The 2016 census measured the population of the village as 2,774 people in 681 households, by which time the district had been separated from the county in the establishment of Raz and Jargalan County. The rural district was transferred to the new Central District, and the village was transferred to Baghleq Rural District created in the same district. Beyk Pulad was the most populous village in its rural district.
