= Qarah Aqaj, North Khorasan =

Village in North Khorasan province, Iran

Qarah Aqaj Persian: قره اقاج
- Village
- Location within Iran
- Coordinates: 38°07′15″N 56°35′14″E
- Country: Iran
- Province: North Khorasan
- County: Raz and Jargalan
- District: Jargalan
- Rural District: Jargalan

Population (2016)
  - Total: 179
- Time zone: UTC+3:30 (IRST)

Qarah Aqaj (Persian: قره اقاج) (Note: Also romanized as Qarah Āqāj; also known as Qarah Āqāj-e Moḩammad Nafas, Mohamad Nafas, Moḩammad Napas, and Mumad-Napas) is a village in Jargalan Rural District of Jargalan District in Raz and Jargalan County, North Khorasan province, Iran.

== Demographics ==
=== Population ===
At the time of the 2006 National Census, the village's population was 722 in 177 households, when it was in the former Raz and Jargalan District of Bojnord County. The following census in 2011 counted 2,732 people in 643 households. The 2016 census measured the population of the village as 481 people in 119 households, by which time the district had been separated from the county in the establishment of Raz and Jargalan County. The rural district was transferred to the new Jargalan District.
