= Porseh Su-ye Olya =

Village in North Khorasan province, Iran

Porseh Su-ye Olya Persian: پرسه سوعليا
- Village
- Location within Iran
- Coordinates: 38°10′05″N 57°01′15″E
- Country: Iran
- Province: North Khorasan
- County: Raz and Jargalan
- District: Gholaman
- Rural District: Rasteqan

Population (2016)
  - Total: 733
- Time zone: UTC+3:30 (IRST)

Porseh Su-ye Olya (Persian: پرسه سوعليا) (Note: Also romanized as Porseh Sū-ye ‘Olyā; also known as Porseh Sū-ye Bālā) is a village in Rasteqan Rural District of Gholaman District in Raz and Jargalan County, North Khorasan province, Iran.

== Demographics ==
=== Population ===
At the time of the 2006 National Census, the village's population was 764 in 171 households, when it was in Gholaman Rural District of the former Raz and Jargalan District in Bojnord County. The following census in 2011 counted 800 people in 179 households. The 2016 census measured the population of the village as 733 people in 178 households, by which time the district had been separated from the county in the establishment of Raz and Jargalan County. The rural district was transferred to the new Gholaman District, and the village was transferred to Rasteqan Rural District created in the same district.
