= Kalateh-ye Abrisham =

Village in North Khorasan province, Iran

Ashraf ol Eslam Persian: كلاته ابريشم
- Village
- Location within Iran
- Coordinates: 38°12′48″N 56°50′24″E
- Country: Iran
- Province: North Khorasan
- County: Raz and Jargalan
- District: Jargalan
- Rural District: Jargalan

Population (2016)
  - Total: 1,279
- Time zone: UTC+3:30 (IRST)

Kalateh-ye Abrisham (Persian: كلاته ابريشم) (Note: Also romanized as Kalāteh-ye Abrīsham) is a village in Jargalan Rural District of Jargalan District in Raz and Jargalan County, North Khorasan province, Iran.

== Demographics ==
=== Population ===
At the time of the 2006 National Census, the village's population was 1,081 in 248 households, when it was in the former Raz and Jargalan District of Bojnord County. The following census in 2011 counted 1,227 people in 275 households. The 2016 census measured the population of the village as 1,279 people in 319 households, by which time the district had been separated from the county in the establishment of Raz and Jargalan County. The rural district was transferred to the new Jargalan District.
