= Mazarlaq =

Village in North Khorasan province, Iran

Mazarlaq Persian: مزارلق
- Village
- Location within Iran
- Coordinates: 38°09′26″N 56°45′07″E
- Country: Iran
- Province: North Khorasan
- County: Raz and Jargalan
- District: Jargalan
- Rural District: Jargalan

Population (2016)
  - Total: 1,183
- Time zone: UTC+3:30 (IRST)

Mazarlaq (Persian: مزارلق) (Note: Also romanized as Mazārlaq; also known as Eslāmbūl (اسلامبول)) is a village in Jargalan Rural District of Jargalan District in Raz and Jargalan County, North Khorasan province, Iran.

== Demographics ==
=== Population ===
At the time of the 2006 National Census, the village's population was 1,037 in 226 households, when it was in the former Raz and Jargalan District of Bojnord County. The following census in 2011 counted 1,053 people in 285 households. The 2016 census measured the population of the village as 1,183 people in 295 households, by which time the district had been separated from the county in the establishment of Raz and Jargalan County. The rural district was transferred to the new Jargalan District.
