= Qush Tappeh, North Khorasan =

Village in North Khorasan province, Iran

Qush Tappeh Persian: قوش تپه
- Village
- Location within Iran
- Coordinates: 37°57′26″N 56°59′02″E
- Country: Iran
- Province: North Khorasan
- County: Raz and Jargalan
- District: Central
- Rural District: Raz

Population (2016)
  - Total: 171
- Time zone: UTC+3:30 (IRST)

Qush Tappeh (Persian: قوش تپه) (Note: Also romanized as Qūsh Tappeh) is a village in Raz Rural District of the Central District in Raz and Jargalan County, North Khorasan province, Iran.

== Demographics ==
=== Population ===
At the time of the 2006 National Census, the village's population was 264 in 58 households, when it was in the former Raz and Jargalan District of Bojnord County. The following census in 2011 counted 188 people in 59 households. The 2016 census measured the population of the village as 171 people in 60 households, by which time the district had been separated from the county in the establishment of Raz and Jargalan County. The rural district was transferred to the new Central District.
