= Karkuli =

Village in North Khorasan province, Iran

Karkuli Persian: كركولي
- Village
- Location within Iran
- Coordinates: 38°10′13″N 56°43′32″E
- Country: Iran
- Province: North Khorasan
- County: Raz and Jargalan
- District: Jargalan
- Rural District: Jargalan

Population (2016)
  - Total: 1,006
- Time zone: UTC+3:30 (IRST)

Karkuli (Persian: كركولي) (Note: Also romanized as Karkūlī) is a village in Jargalan Rural District of Jargalan District in Raz and Jargalan County, North Khorasan province, Iran.

== Demographics ==
=== Population ===
At the time of the 2006 National Census, the village's population was 827 in 201 households, when it was in the former Raz and Jargalan District of Bojnord County. The following census in 2011 counted 766 people in 203 households. The 2016 census measured the population of the village as 1,006 people in 263 households, by which time the district had been separated from the county in the establishment of Raz and Jargalan County. The rural district was transferred to the new Jargalan District.
