= Qaleh-ye Qushin =

Village in North Khorasan province, Iran

Qaleh-ye Qushin Persian: قلعه قوشين
- Village
- Location within Iran
- Coordinates: 37°54′17″N 57°01′11″E
- Country: Iran
- Province: North Khorasan
- County: Raz and Jargalan
- District: Central
- Rural District: Raz

Population (2016)
  - Total: 123
- Time zone: UTC+3:30 (IRST)

Qaleh-ye Qushin (Persian: قلعه قوشين) (Note: Also romanized as Qal‘eh-ye Qūshīn) is a village in Raz Rural District of the Central District in Raz and Jargalan County, North Khorasan province, Iran.

== Demographics ==
=== Population ===
At the time of the 2006 National Census, the village's population was 161 in 34 households, when it was in the former Raz and Jargalan District of Bojnord County. The following census in 2011 counted 120 people in 33 households. The 2016 census measured the population of the village as 123 people in 35 households, by which time the district had been separated from the county in the establishment of Raz and Jargalan County. The rural district was transferred to the new Central District.
