= Farah Din =

Village in North Khorasan province, Iran

Farah Din Persian: فرح دين
- Village
- Location within Iran
- Coordinates: 37°56′27″N 56°51′01″E
- Country: Iran
- Province: North Khorasan
- County: Raz and Jargalan
- District: Central
- Rural District: Raz

Population (2016)
  - Total: 151
- Time zone: UTC+3:30 (IRST)

Farah Din (Persian: فرح دين) (Note: Also romanized as Faraḩ Dīn) is a village in Raz Rural District of the Central District in Raz and Jargalan County, North Khorasan province, Iran.

== Demographics ==
=== Population ===
At the time of the 2006 National Census, the village's population was 211 in 55 households, when it was in the former Raz and Jargalan District of Bojnord County. The following census in 2011 counted 206 people in 66 households. The 2016 census measured the population of the village as 151 people in 53 households, by which time the district had been separated from the county in the establishment of Raz and Jargalan County. The rural district was transferred to the new Central District.
