= Qarayeh Seydnur =

Village in North Khorasan province, Iran

Qarayeh Seydnur Persian: قريه صيدنور
- Village
- Location within Iran
- Coordinates: 38°10′21″N 56°44′07″E
- Country: Iran
- Province: North Khorasan
- County: Raz and Jargalan
- District: Jargalan
- Rural District: Jargalan

Population (2016)
  - Total: 85
- Time zone: UTC+3:30 (IRST)

Qarayeh Seydnur (Persian: قريه صيدنور) (Note: Also romanized as Qarayeh Seydnūr; also known as Seydnor) is a village in Jargalan Rural District of Jargalan District in Raz and Jargalan County, North Khorasan province, Iran.

== Demographics ==
=== Population ===
At the time of the 2006 National Census, the village's population was 192 in 55 households, when it was in the former Raz and Jargalan District of Bojnord County. The following census in 2011 counted 155 people in 47 households. The 2016 census measured the population of the village as 85 people in 28 households, by which time the district had been separated from the county in the establishment of Raz and Jargalan County. The rural district was transferred to the new Jargalan District.
