= Amanli =

Village in North Khorasan province, Iran

Amanli Persian: امانلي
- Village
- Location within Iran
- Coordinates: 37°57′20″N 56°45′04″E
- Country: Iran
- Province: North Khorasan
- County: Raz and Jargalan
- District: Central
- Rural District: Raz

Population (2016)
  - Total: 971
- Time zone: UTC+3:30 (IRST)

Amanli (Persian: امانلي) (Note: Also romanized as Amānlī) is a village in Raz Rural District of the Central District in Raz and Jargalan County, North Khorasan province, Iran.

== Demographics ==
=== Population ===
At the time of the 2006 National Census, the village's population was 832 in 204 households, when it was in the former Raz and Jargalan District of Bojnord County. The following census in 2011 counted 985 people in 238 households. The 2016 census measured the population of the village as 971 people in 237 households, by which time the district had been separated from the county in the establishment of Raz and Jargalan County. The rural district was transferred to the new Central District.
