= Gar Gaz =

Village in North Khorasan province, Iran

Gar Gaz Persian: گرگز
- Village
- Location within Iran
- Coordinates: 38°09′56″N 56°39′45″E
- Country: Iran
- Province: North Khorasan
- County: Raz and Jargalan
- District: Jargalan
- Rural District: Jargalan

Population (2016)
  - Total: 2,199
- Time zone: UTC+3:30 (IRST)

Gar Gaz (Persian: گرگز) (Note: Also known as Gar Kaz) is a village in Jargalan Rural District of Jargalan District in Raz and Jargalan County, North Khorasan province, Iran.

== Demographics ==
=== Population ===
At the time of the 2006 National Census, the village's population was 2,014 in 460 households, when it was in the former Raz and Jargalan District of Bojnord County. The following census in 2011 counted 2,170 people in 527 households. The 2016 census measured the population of the village as 2,199 people in 584 households, by which time the district had been separated from the county in the establishment of Raz and Jargalan County. The rural district was transferred to the new Jargalan District.
