= Yekkeh Soud-e Olya =

Neighborhood in North Khorasan province, Iran

Yekkeh Soud-e Olya Persian: يكه سعودعليا
- Neighborhood
- Location within Iran
- Country: Iran
- Province: North Khorasan
- County: Raz and Jargalan
- District: Jargalan
- Rural District: Jargalan
- Village: Yekkeh Soud

Population (2016)
  - Total: 1,855
- Time zone: UTC+3:30 (IRST)

Yekkeh Soud-e Olya (Persian: يكه سعودعليا) (Note: Also romanized as Yekkeh So’ud-e ‘Olyā; also known as Yekkeh Se’ud and Yekkeh So’ud-e Bālā) is a neighborhood in the village of Yekkeh Soud in Jargalan Rural District of Jargalan District in Raz and Jargalan County, North Khorasan province, Iran.

== Demographics ==
=== Population ===
At the time of the 2006 National Census, Yekkeh Soud-e Olya's population was 1,657 in 355 households, when it was a village in Jargalan Rural District of the former Raz and Jargalan District in Bojnord County. The following census in 2011 counted 1,832 people in 470 households. The 2016 census measured the population of the village as 1,855 people in 482 households, by which time the district had been separated from the county in the establishment of Raz and Jargalan County. The rural district was transferred to the new Jargalan District.

In 2019, Yekkeh Soud-e Sofla merged with the villages of Hasanabad and Yekkeh Soud-e Olya to become the village of Yekkeh Soud.
