= Anabay =

Village in North Khorasan province, Iran

Anabay Persian: اناباي
- Village
- Location within Iran
- Coordinates: 37°58′51″N 56°59′33″E
- Country: Iran
- Province: North Khorasan
- County: Raz and Jargalan
- District: Central
- Rural District: Raz

Population (2016)
  - Total: 86
- Time zone: UTC+3:30 (IRST)

Anabay (Persian: اناباي) (Note: Also romanized as Ānābāy; also known as Ānāpāy) is a village in Raz Rural District of the Central District in Raz and Jargalan County, North Khorasan province, Iran.

== Demographics ==
=== Population ===
At the time of the 2006 National Census, the village's population was 182 in 50 households, when it was in the former Raz and Jargalan District of Bojnord County. The following census in 2011 counted 89 people in 28 households. The 2016 census measured the population of the village as 86 people in 31 households, by which time the district had been separated from the county in the establishment of Raz and Jargalan County. The rural district was transferred to the new Central District.
