= Mazraeh Chal Tak Pak =

Village in North Khorasan province, Iran

Mazraeh Chal Tak Pak Persian: مزرعه چال تك پك
- Village
- Location within Iran
- Coordinates: 38°06′39″N 56°42′34″E
- Country: Iran
- Province: North Khorasan
- County: Raz and Jargalan
- District: Jargalan
- Rural District: Jargalan

Population (2016)
  - Total: 245
- Time zone: UTC+3:30 (IRST)

Mazraeh Chal Tak Pak (Persian: مزرعه چال تك پك) (Note: Also romanized as Mazra‘eh Chāl Taḵ Paḵ) is a village in Jargalan Rural District of Jargalan District in Raz and Jargalan County, North Khorasan province, Iran.

== Demographics ==
=== Population ===
At the time of the 2006 National Census, the village's population was 185 in 45 households, when it was in the former Raz and Jargalan District of Bojnord County. The following census in 2011 counted 179 people in 42 households. The 2016 census measured the population of the village as 245 people in 56 households, by which time the district had been separated from the county in the establishment of Raz and Jargalan County. The rural district was transferred to the new Jargalan District.
