= Dashli Qaleh =

Village in North Khorasan province, Iran

Dashli Qaleh Persian: داشلي قلعه
- Village
- Location within Iran
- Coordinates: 38°08′23″N 57°14′43″E
- Country: Iran
- Province: North Khorasan
- County: Raz and Jargalan
- District: Gholaman
- Rural District: Gholaman

Population (2016)
  - Total: 861
- Time zone: UTC+3:30 (IRST)

Dashli Qaleh (Persian: داشلي قلعه) (Note: Also romanized as Dāshlī Qal‘eh) is a village in Gholaman Rural District of Gholaman District in Raz and Jargalan County, North Khorasan province, Iran.

== Demographics ==
=== Population ===
At the time of the 2006 National Census, the village's population was 910 in 228 households, when it was in the former Raz and Jargalan District of Bojnord County. The following census in 2011 counted 876 people in 244 households. The 2016 census measured the population of the village as 861 people in 266 households, by which time the district had been separated from the county in the establishment of Raz and Jargalan County. The rural district was transferred to the new Gholaman District.
