= Kalateh-ye Shiru =

Village in North Khorasan province, Iran

Kalateh-ye Shiru Persian: كلاته شيرو
- Village
- Country: Iran
- Province: North Khorasan
- County: Raz and Jargalan
- District: Central
- Rural District: Raz

Population (2016)
  - Total: 27
- Time zone: UTC+3:30 (IRST)

Kalateh-ye Shiru (Persian: كلاته شيرو) (Note: Also romanized as Kalāteh-ye Shīrū) is a village in Raz Rural District of the Central District in Raz and Jargalan County, North Khorasan province, Iran.

== Demographics ==
=== Population ===
At the time of the 2006 National Census, the village's population was 19 in six households, when it was in the former Raz and Jargalan District of Bojnord County. The following census in 2011 counted 11 people in four households. The 2016 census measured the population of the village as 27 people in eight households, by which time the district had been separated from the county in the establishment of Raz and Jargalan County. The rural district was transferred to the new Central District.
