= Bahar, North Khorasan =

Village in North Khorasan province, Iran

Bahar Persian: بهار
- Village
- Location within Iran
- Coordinates: 38°15′57″N 56°46′06″E
- Country: Iran
- Province: North Khorasan
- County: Raz and Jargalan
- District: Jargalan
- Rural District: Jargalan

Population (2016)
  - Total: 519
- Time zone: UTC+3:30 (IRST)

Bahar (Persian: بهار) (Note: Also romanized as Bahār; also known Kalateh-ye Bahar (كلاته بهار), also romanized as Kalāteh-ye Bahār) is a village in Jargalan Rural District of Jargalan District in Raz and Jargalan County, North Khorasan province, Iran.

== Demographics ==
=== Population ===
At the time of the 2006 National Census, the village's population was 407 in 103 households, when it was in the former Raz and Jargalan District of Bojnord County. The following census in 2011 counted 417 people in 108 households. The 2016 census measured the population of the village as 519 people in 136 households, by which time the district had been separated from the county in the establishment of Raz and Jargalan County. The rural district was transferred to the new Jargalan District.
