= Esferuj =

Village in North Khorasan province, Iran

Esferuj Persian: اسفروج
- Village
- Location within Iran
- Coordinates: 37°57′33″N 56°59′31″E
- Country: Iran
- Province: North Khorasan
- County: Raz and Jargalan
- District: Central
- Rural District: Raz

Population (2016)
  - Total: 54
- Time zone: UTC+3:30 (IRST)

Esferuj (Persian: اسفروج) (Note: Also romanized as Esferūj) is a village in Raz Rural District of the Central District in Raz and Jargalan County, North Khorasan province, Iran.

== Demographics ==
=== Population ===
At the time of the 2006 National Census, the village's population was 91 in 21 households, when it was in the former Raz and Jargalan District of Bojnord County. The following census in 2011 counted 74 people in 26 households. The 2016 census measured the population of the village as 54 people in 21 households, by which time the district had been separated from the county in the establishment of Raz and Jargalan County. The rural district was transferred to the new Central District.
