= Porseh Su-ye Sofla =

Village in North Khorasan province, Iran

Porseh Su-ye Sofla Persian: پرسه سوي سفلي
- Village
- Location within Iran
- Coordinates: 38°10′59″N 57°00′59″E
- Country: Iran
- Province: North Khorasan
- County: Raz and Jargalan
- District: Gholaman
- Rural District: Rasteqan

Population (2016)
  - Total: 331
- Time zone: UTC+3:30 (IRST)

Porseh Su-ye Sofla (Persian: پرسه سوي سفلي) (Note: Also romanized as Porseh Sū-ye Soflá; also known as Porseh Sū-ye Pā’īn) is a village in Rasteqan Rural District of Gholaman District in Raz and Jargalan County, North Khorasan province, Iran.

== Demographics ==
=== Population ===
At the time of the 2006 National Census, the village's population was 339 in 64 households, when it was in Gholaman Rural District of the former Raz and Jargalan District in Bojnord County. The following census in 2011 counted 338 people in 77 households. The 2016 census measured the population of the village as 331 people in 80 households, by which time the district had been separated from the county in the establishment of Raz and Jargalan County. The rural district was transferred to the new Gholaman District, and the village was transferred to Rasteqan Rural District created in the same district.
