= Qavolqa =

Village in North Khorasan province, Iran

Qavolqa Persian: قاولقا
- Village
- Location within Iran
- Coordinates: 38°07′59″N 56°48′21″E
- Country: Iran
- Province: North Khorasan
- County: Raz and Jargalan
- District: Jargalan
- Rural District: Jargalan

Population (2016)
  - Total: 622
- Time zone: UTC+3:30 (IRST)

Qavolqa (Persian: قاولقا) (Note: Also romanized as Qāvolqā) is a village in Jargalan Rural District of Jargalan District in Raz and Jargalan County, North Khorasan province, Iran.

== Demographics ==
=== Population ===
At the time of the 2006 National Census, the village's population was 478 in 116 households, when it was in the former Raz and Jargalan District of Bojnord County. The following census in 2011 counted 615 people in 144 households. The 2016 census measured the population of the village as 622 people in 157 households, by which time the district had been separated from the county in the establishment of Raz and Jargalan County. The rural district was transferred to the new Jargalan District.
