= Tangeh-ye Raz =

Village in North Khorasan province, Iran

Tangeh-ye Raz Persian: تنگه راز
- Village
- Location within Iran
- Coordinates: 37°57′15″N 56°55′58″E
- Country: Iran
- Province: North Khorasan
- County: Raz and Jargalan
- District: Central
- Rural District: Raz

Population (2016)
  - Total: 222
- Time zone: UTC+3:30 (IRST)

Tangeh-ye Raz (Persian: تنگه راز) (Note: Also romanized as Tangeh Rāz and Tangeh-ye Rāz; also known as Tangeh-ye Zār) is a village in, and the former capital of, Raz Rural District in the Central District of Raz and Jargalan County, North Khorasan province, Iran. The capital of the rural district has been transferred to the village of Tangeh-ye Torkaman.

== Demographics ==
=== Population ===
At the time of the 2006 National Census, the village's population was 355 in 90 households, when it was in the former Raz and Jargalan District of Bojnord County. The following census in 2011 counted 170 people in 49 households. The 2016 census measured the population of the village as 222 people in 73 households, by which time the district had been separated from the county in the establishment of Raz and Jargalan County. The rural district was transferred to the new Central District.
