= Adineh Qoli =

Village in North Khorasan province, Iran

Adineh Qoli Persian: ادينه قلي
- Village
- Location within Iran
- Coordinates: 38°06′43″N 57°14′39″E
- Country: Iran
- Province: North Khorasan
- County: Raz and Jargalan
- District: Gholaman
- Rural District: Gholaman

Population (2016)
  - Total: 522
- Time zone: UTC+3:30 (IRST)

Adineh Qoli (Persian: ادينه قلي) (Note: Also romanized as Adīneh Qolī; also known as Ādīneh Qal‘eh) is a village in Gholaman Rural District of Gholaman District in Raz and Jargalan County, North Khorasan province, Iran.

== Demographics ==
=== Population ===
At the time of the 2006 National Census, the village's population was 605 in 132 households, when it was in the former Raz and Jargalan District of Bojnord County. The following census in 2011 counted 486 people in 124 households. The 2016 census measured the population of the village as 522 people in 144 households, by which time the district had been separated from the county in the establishment of Raz and Jargalan County. The rural district was transferred to the new Gholaman District.
