= Abdollahabad, Raz and Jargalan =

Village in North Khorasan province, Iran

Abdollahabad Persian: عبداله اباد
- Village
- Location within Iran
- Coordinates: 37°56′22″N 56°52′34″E
- Country: Iran
- Province: North Khorasan
- County: Raz and Jargalan
- District: Central
- Rural District: Raz

Population (2016)
  - Total: 112
- Time zone: UTC+3:30 (IRST)

Abdollahabad (Persian: عبداله اباد) (Note: Also romanized as ‘Abdollāhābād) is a village in Raz Rural District of the Central District in Raz and Jargalan County, North Khorasan province, Iran.

== Demographics ==
=== Population ===
At the time of the 2006 National Census, the village's population was 108 in 28 households, when it was in the former Raz and Jargalan District of Bojnord County. The following census in 2011 counted 105 people in 26 households. The 2016 census measured the population of the village as 112 people in 28 households, by which time the district had been separated from the county in the establishment of Raz and Jargalan County. The rural district was transferred to the new Central District.
