= Duydukh-e Olya =

Village in North Khorasan province, Iran

Duydukh-e Olya Persian: دويدوخ عليا
- Village
- Location within Iran
- Coordinates: 38°07′27″N 56°41′19″E
- Country: Iran
- Province: North Khorasan
- County: Raz and Jargalan
- District: Jargalan
- Rural District: Jargalan

Population (2016)
  - Total: 2,150
- Time zone: UTC+3:30 (IRST)

Duydukh-e Olya (Persian: دويدوخ عليا) (Note: Also romanized as Dūydūkh-e ‘Olyā; also known as Dowydokh-e Bālā, Duydokh, and Dūydokh-e ‘Olyā ( دويدخ عليا)) is a village in Jargalan Rural District of Jargalan District in Raz and Jargalan County, North Khorasan province, Iran.

== Demographics ==
=== Population ===
At the time of the 2006 National Census, the village's population was 2,032 in 405 households, when it was in the former Raz and Jargalan District of Bojnord County. The following census in 2011 counted 2,011 people in 547 households. The 2016 census measured the population of the village as 2,150 people in 573 households, by which time the district had been separated from the county in the establishment of Raz and Jargalan County. The rural district was transferred to the new Jargalan District.
