= Tazeh Qaleh, Raz and Jargalan =

Village in North Khorasan province, Iran

Tazeh Qaleh Persian: تازه قلعه
- Village
- Location within Iran
- Coordinates: 38°03′48″N 57°17′37″E
- Country: Iran
- Province: North Khorasan
- County: Raz and Jargalan
- District: Gholaman
- Rural District: Gholaman

Population (2016)
  - Total: 953
- Time zone: UTC+3:30 (IRST)

Tazeh Qaleh (Persian: تازه قلعه) (Note: Also romanized as Tāzeh Qal‘eh; also known as Tāzeh Qal‘eh-ye Tork hā) is a village in Gholaman Rural District of Gholaman District in Raz and Jargalan County, North Khorasan province, Iran.

== Demographics ==
=== Population ===
At the time of the 2006 National Census, the village's population was 1,541 in 391 households, when it was in the former Raz and Jargalan District of Bojnord County. The following census in 2011 counted 1,270 people in 349 households. The 2016 census measured the population of the village as 953 people in 296 households, by which time the district had been separated from the county in the establishment of Raz and Jargalan County. The rural district was transferred to the new Gholaman District.
