= Ashraf ol Eslam =

Village in North Khorasan province, Iran

Ashraf ol Eslam Persian: اشرف الاسلام
- Village
- Location within Iran
- Coordinates: 38°10′36″N 56°42′49″E
- Country: Iran
- Province: North Khorasan
- County: Raz and Jargalan
- District: Jargalan
- Rural District: Jargalan

Population (2016)
  - Total: 556
- Time zone: UTC+3:30 (IRST)

Ashraf ol Eslam (Persian: اشرف الاسلام) (Note: Also romanized as Asharf ol Eslam and Āshraf ol Eslām; also known as Sharf ol Salām) is a village in Jargalan Rural District of Jargalan District in Raz and Jargalan County, North Khorasan province, Iran.

== Demographics ==
=== Population ===
At the time of the 2006 National Census, the village's population was 369 in 87 households, when it was in the former Raz and Jargalan District of Bojnord County. The following census in 2011 counted 379 people in 96 households. The 2016 census measured the population of the village as 556 people in 151 households, by which time the district had been separated from the county in the establishment of Raz and Jargalan County. The rural district was transferred to the new Jargalan District.
