= Pashindeh =

Village in North Khorasan province, Iran

Pashindeh Persian: پشين ده
- Village
- Location within Iran
- Coordinates: 37°53′40″N 57°04′11″E
- Country: Iran
- Province: North Khorasan
- County: Raz and Jargalan
- District: Central
- Rural District: Raz

Population (2016)
  - Total: 1,127
- Time zone: UTC+3:30 (IRST)

Pashindeh (Persian: پشين ده) (Note: Also romanized as Pashīndeh; also known as Pashandeh, Pashvandeh, Pīshandeh, and Poshvandeh) is a village in Raz Rural District of the Central District in Raz and Jargalan County, North Khorasan province, Iran.

== Demographics ==
=== Population ===
At the time of the 2006 National Census, the village's population was 1,178 in 266 households, when it was in the former Raz and Jargalan District of Bojnord County. The following census in 2011 counted 1,154 people in 318 households. The 2016 census measured the population of the village as 1,127 people in 308 households, by which time the district had been separated from the county in the establishment of Raz and Jargalan County. The rural district was transferred to the new Central District.
