= Guy Nik =

Village in North Khorasan province, Iran

Guy Nik Persian: گوي نيك
- Village
- Location within Iran
- Coordinates: 37°59′56″N 57°00′54″E
- Country: Iran
- Province: North Khorasan
- County: Raz and Jargalan
- District: Central
- Rural District: Raz

Population (2016)
  - Total: 492
- Time zone: UTC+3:30 (IRST)

Guy Nik (Persian: گوي نيك) (Note: Also romanized as Gūy Nīk; also known as Gūynak) is a village in Raz Rural District of the Central District in Raz and Jargalan County, North Khorasan province, Iran.

== Demographics ==
=== Population ===
At the time of the 2006 National Census, the village's population was 454 in 126 households, when it was in the former Raz and Jargalan District of Bojnord County. The following census in 2011 counted 302 people in 100 households. The 2016 census measured the population of the village as 492 people in 160 households, by which time the district had been separated from the county in the establishment of Raz and Jargalan County. The rural district was transferred to the new Central District.
