= Quri Darreh =

Village in North Khorasan province, Iran

Quri Darreh Persian: قوري دره
- Village
- Location within Iran
- Coordinates: 38°14′27″N 56°48′51″E
- Country: Iran
- Province: North Khorasan
- County: Raz and Jargalan
- District: Jargalan
- Rural District: Jargalan

Population (2016)
  - Total: 329
- Time zone: UTC+3:30 (IRST)

Quri Darreh (Persian: قوري دره) (Note: Also romanized as Qūrī Darreh) is a village in Jargalan Rural District of Jargalan District in Raz and Jargalan County, North Khorasan province, Iran.

== Demographics ==
=== Population ===
At the time of the 2006 National Census, the village's population was 268 in 59 households, when it was in the former Raz and Jargalan District of Bojnord County. The following census in 2011 counted 291 people in 60 households. The 2016 census measured the population of the village as 329 people in 75 households, by which time the district had been separated from the county in the establishment of Raz and Jargalan County. The rural district was transferred to the new Jargalan District.
