= Qarah Qanlu, Raz and Jargalan =

Village in North Khorasan province, Iran

Qarah Qanlu Persian: قره قانلو
- Village
- Location within Iran
- Coordinates: 38°15′18″N 56°44′14″E
- Country: Iran
- Province: North Khorasan
- County: Raz and Jargalan
- District: Jargalan
- Rural District: Jargalan

Population (2016)
  - Total: 358
- Time zone: UTC+3:30 (IRST)

Qarah Qanlu (Persian: قره قانلو){{efn}Also romanized as Qarah Qānlū}} is a village in Jargalan Rural District of Jargalan District in Raz and Jargalan County, North Khorasan province, Iran.

== Demographics ==
=== Population ===
At the time of the 2006 National Census, the village's population was 417 in 95 households, when it was in the former Raz and Jargalan District of Bojnord County. The following census in 2011 counted 396 people in 87 households. The 2016 census measured the population of the village as 358 people in 83 households, by which time the district had been separated from the county in the establishment of Raz and Jargalan County. The rural district was transferred to the new Jargalan District.
