= Tangeh-ye Torkaman =

Village in North Khorasan province, Iran

Tangeh-ye Torkaman Persian: تنگه تركمن
- Village
- Location within Iran
- Coordinates: 37°56′04″N 56°55′17″E
- Country: Iran
- Province: North Khorasan
- County: Raz and Jargalan
- District: Central
- Rural District: Raz

Population (2016)
  - Total: 1,567
- Time zone: UTC+3:30 (IRST)

Tangeh-ye Torkaman (Persian: تنگه تركمن) (Note: Also romanized as Tangeh Torkaman) is a village in, and the capital of, Raz Rural District in the Central District of Raz and Jargalan County, North Khorasan province, Iran. The previous capital of the rural district was the village of Tangeh-ye Raz.

== Demographics ==
=== Population ===
At the time of the 2006 National Census, the village's population was 1,560 in 331 households, when it was in the former Raz and Jargalan District of Bojnord County. The following census in 2011 counted 1,589 people in 370 households. The 2016 census measured the population of the village as 1,567 people in 386 households, by which time the district had been separated from the county in the establishment of Raz and Jargalan County. The rural district was transferred to the new Central District. Tangeh-ye Torkaman was the most populous village in its rural district.
