= Buyaqoli =

Village in North Khorasan province, Iran

Buyaqoli Persian: بوياقلي
- Village
- Location within Iran
- Coordinates: 38°07′19″N 56°45′53″E
- Country: Iran
- Province: North Khorasan
- County: Raz and Jargalan
- District: Jargalan
- Rural District: Jargalan

Population (2016)
  - Total: 509
- Time zone: UTC+3:30 (IRST)

Buyaqoli (Persian: بوياقلي) (Note: Also romanized as Būyāqolī) is a village in Jargalan Rural District of Jargalan District in Raz and Jargalan County, North Khorasan province, Iran.

== Demographics ==
=== Population ===
At the time of the 2006 National Census, the village's population was 446 in 104 households, when it was in the former Raz and Jargalan District of Bojnord County. The following census in 2011 counted 442 people in 119 households. The 2016 census measured the population of the village as 509 people in 126 households, by which time the district had been separated from the county in the establishment of Raz and Jargalan County. The rural district was transferred to the new Jargalan District.
