= Jolof Darreh =

Village in North Khorasan province, Iran

Jolof Darreh Persian: جلفدره
- Village
- Location within Iran
- Coordinates: 37°57′32″N 57°00′50″E
- Country: Iran
- Province: North Khorasan
- County: Raz and Jargalan
- District: Central
- Rural District: Raz

Population (2016)
  - Total: 173
- Time zone: UTC+3:30 (IRST)

Jolof Darreh (Persian: جلفدره) is a village in Raz Rural District of the Central District in Raz and Jargalan County, North Khorasan province, Iran.

== Demographics ==
=== Population ===
At the time of the 2006 National Census, the village's population was 204 in 41 households, when it was in the former Raz and Jargalan District of Bojnord County. The following census in 2011 counted 170 people in 48 households. The 2016 census measured the population of the village as 173 people in 53 households, by which time the district had been separated from the county in the establishment of Raz and Jargalan County. The rural district was transferred to the new Central District.
