= Qezel =

Qezel or Qazal (Persian: قزل) may refer to:

- Qazal, Kermanshah
- Qezel, North Khorasan
