= Porseh Su =

Porseh Su (Persian: پرسه سو) may refer to:

- Porseh Su-ye Olya
- Porseh Su-ye Sofla
