= Gholaman =

Village in North Khorasan province, Iran

Gholaman Persian: غلامان
- Village
- Location within Iran
- Coordinates: 38°03′27″N 57°08′32″E
- Country: Iran
- Province: North Khorasan
- County: Raz and Jargalan
- District: Gholaman
- Rural District: Gholaman

Population (2016)
  - Total: 2,867
- Time zone: UTC+3:30 (IRST)

Gholaman (Persian: غلامان) (Note: Also romanized as Gholāmān; also known as Qolāmān) is a village in Gholaman Rural District of Gholaman District in Raz and Jargalan County, North Khorasan province, Iran, serving as capital of both the district and the rural district.

== Demographics ==
=== Population ===
At the time of the 2006 National Census, the village's population was 2,665 in 690 households, when it was in the former Raz and Jargalan District of Bojnord County. The following census in 2011 counted 3,684 people in 965 households. The 2016 census measured the population of the village as 2,867 people in 860 households, by which time the district had been separated from the county in the establishment of Raz and Jargalan County. The rural district was transferred to the new Gholaman District. Gholaman was the most populous village in its rural district.
