= Yekkeh Soud =

Yekkeh Soud or Yekkeh Seud (Persian: يكه سعود) may refer to:

- Yekkeh Soud-e Olya
- Yekkeh Soud-e Sofla
