= Tutli-ye Sofla =

Village in North Khorasan province, Iran

Tutli-ye Sofla Persian: توتلي سفلي
- Village

- Location within Iran
- Coordinates: 38°08′39″N 56°47′07″E
- Country: Iran
- Province: North Khorasan
- County: Raz and Jargalan
- District: Jargalan
- Rural District: Jargalan

Population (2016)
  - Total: 621
- Time zone: UTC+3:30 (IRST)

Tutli-ye Sofla (Persian: توتلي سفلي) (Note: Also romanized as Tūtlī Soflá and Tūtlī-ye Soflá; also known as Āshāqī Tūtlī (اشاقي توتلي), Tūtlī, and Tūtlī-ye Pā’īn) is a village in Jargalan Rural District of Jargalan District in Raz and Jargalan County, North Khorasan province, Iran.

== Demographics ==
=== Population ===
At the time of the 2006 National Census, the village's population was 449 in 100 households, when it was in the former Raz and Jargalan District of Bojnord County. The following census in 2011 counted 487 people in 107 households. The 2016 census measured the population of the village as 621 people in 151 households, by which time the district had been separated from the county in the establishment of Raz and Jargalan County. The rural district was transferred to the new Jargalan District.
