= Tutli =

Tutli (Persian: توتلي) may refer to:

- Tutli-ye Kuchek
- Tutli-ye Olya
- Tutli-ye Sofla
