= Tutli-ye Olya =

Village in North Khorasan province, Iran

Tutli-ye Olya Persian: توتلي عليا
- Village
- Location within Iran
- Coordinates: 38°08′28″N 56°47′37″E
- Country: Iran
- Province: North Khorasan
- County: Raz and Jargalan
- District: Jargalan
- Rural District: Jargalan

Population (2016)
  - Total: 823
- Time zone: UTC+3:30 (IRST)

Tutli-ye Olya (Persian: توتلي عليا) (Note: Also romanized as Tūtlī-ye ‘Olyā; also known as Tūtlī-ye Bālā) is a village in Jargalan Rural District of Jargalan District in Raz and Jargalan County, North Khorasan province, Iran.

== Demographics ==
=== Population ===
At the time of the 2006 National Census, the village's population was 652 in 127 households, when it was in the former Raz and Jargalan District of Bojnord County. The following census in 2011 counted 839 people in 180 households. The 2016 census measured the population of the village as 823 people in 201 households, by which time the district had been separated from the county in the establishment of Raz and Jargalan County. The rural district was transferred to the new Jargalan District.
