= Oshtut =

Oshtut (Persian: اشتوت) may refer to:

- Oshtut-e Bala
- Oshtut-e Pain
