= Karposhtli =

Karposhtli (Persian: كرپشتلي) may refer to:

- Karposhtli-ye Baghi
- Karposhtli-ye Olya
