= Gonbadli =

Gonbadli (Persian: گنبدلي) may refer to:

- Gonbadli, North Khorasan
- Gonbadli, Razavi Khorasan
