= Rasteqan Rural District =

Rural district in North Khorasan province, Iran

Rasteqan Rural District Persian: دهستان راستقان
- Rural District
- Location within Iran
- Coordinates: 38°11′N 57°09′E
- Country: Iran
- Province: North Khorasan
- County: Raz and Jargalan
- District: Gholaman
- Established: 2012
- Capital: Rasteqan

Population (2016)
  - Total: 6,481
- Time zone: UTC+3:30 (IRST)

Rasteqan Rural District (Persian: دهستان راستقان) is in Gholaman District of Raz and Jargalan County, North Khorasan province, Iran. Its capital is the village of Rasteqan.

== History ==
In 2012, Raz and Jargalan District was separated from Bojnord County in the establishment of Raz and Jargalan County, and Rasteqan Rural District was created in the new Gholaman District.

== Demographics ==
=== Population ===
At the time of the 2016 National Census, the rural district's population was 6,481 in 1,852 households. The most populous of its 10 villages was Seyu Khosu Hashem, with 1,441 people.

=== Other villages in the rural district ===
- Besh Darreh
- Kalateh-ye At Ali
- Kalateh-ye Hasan Qoli
- Porseh Su-ye Olya
- Porseh Su-ye Sofla
- Qareh Bater
- Seyu Khosu Anqolab
- Taklah Quz
