= Qizil =

Qizil may refer to:

- Kizil Caves, in Baicheng County (Bay), Aksu Prefecture, Xinjiang, China
- Qizil, Iran, a village in Kermanshah Province, Iran
