= Hesarcheh Rural District =

Rural district in North Khorasan province, Iran

Hesarcheh Rural District Persian: دهستان حصارچه
- Rural District
- Location within Iran
- Coordinates: 38°10′48″N 56°27′00″E
- Country: Iran
- Province: North Khorasan
- County: Raz and Jargalan
- District: Jargalan
- Established: 2012
- Capital: Hesarcheh-ye Bala

Population (2016)
  - Total: 9,826
- Time zone: UTC+3:30 (IRST)

Hesarcheh Rural District (Persian: دهستان حصارچه) is in Jargalan District of Raz and Jargalan County, North Khorasan province, Iran. Its capital is the village of Hesarcheh-ye Bala.

== History ==
In 2012, Raz and Jargalan District was separated from Bojnord County in the establishment of Raz and Jargalan County, and Hesarcheh Rural District was created in the new Jargalan District.

== Demographics ==
=== Population ===
At the time of the 2016 National Census, the rural district's population was 9,826 in 2,500 households. The most populous of its 15 villages was Bacheh Darreh, with 1,776 people.

=== Other villages in the rural district ===
- Eqreqayeh
- Hesarcheh-ye Pain
- Karposhtli-ye Baghi
- Karposhtli-ye Olya
- Kilu Panjeh
- Mazraeh-ye Bacheh Darreh-ye Olya
- Oshtut-e Bala
- Oshtut-e Pain
- Qarah Parcheq
- Qezel
