= Kafaran Castle =

Castle in North Khorasan Province, Iran

Kafaran castle
- قلعه کافران

General information
- Type: Castle
- Location: Raz and Jargalan County, Iran

Kafaran castle (Persian: قلعه کافران) is a historical castle located in Raz and Jargalan County in North Khorasan Province, The longevity of this fortress dates back to the Early and middle centuries of post-Islamic historical periods.
