= Yekkeh Soud, Iran =

Village in North Khorasan province, Iran

Yekkeh Soud Persian: يكه سعود
- Village
- Location within Iran
- Coordinates: 38°10′46″N 56°40′33″E
- Country: Iran
- Province: North Khorasan
- County: Raz and Jargalan
- District: Jargalan
- Rural District: Jargalan

Population (2016)
  - Total: 2,852
- Time zone: UTC+3:30 (IRST)

Yekkeh Soud (Persian: يكه سعود) (Note: Also romanized as Yekkeh So‘ūd; formerly Yekkeh Soud-e Sofla (يكه سعود سفلي), also romanized as Yekkeh So‘ūd-e Soflá; also known as Yekkeh So‘ūd-e Pā’īn) is a village in Jargalan Rural District of Jargalan District in Raz and Jargalan County, North Khorasan province, Iran, serving as capital of both the district and the rural district.

== Demographics ==
=== Population ===
At the time of the 2006 National Census, the village's population was 2,388 in 544 households, when it was listed as Yekkeh Soud-e Sofla in the former Raz and Jargalan District of Bojnord County. The following census in 2011 counted 2,732 people in 643 households. The 2016 census measured the population of the village as 2,852 people in 718 households, by which time the district had been separated from the county in the establishment of Raz and Jargalan County. The rural district was transferred to the new Jargalan District. It was the most populous village in its rural district.

In 2019, Yekkeh Soud-e Sofla merged with the villages of Hasanabad and Yekkeh Soud-e Olya to become the village of Yekkeh Soud.
