= Baghleq Rural District =

Rural district in North Khorasan province, Iran

Baghleq Rural District Persian: دهستان باغلق
- Rural District
- Location within Iran
- Coordinates: 38°07′48″N 56°54′36″E
- Country: Iran
- Province: North Khorasan
- County: Raz and Jargalan
- District: Central
- Established: 2012
- Capital: Baghleq

Population (2016)
  - Total: 8,909
- Time zone: UTC+3:30 (IRST)

Baghleq Rural District (Persian: دهستان باغلق) is in the Central District of Raz and Jargalan County, North Khorasan province, Iran. Its capital is the village of Baghleq.

== History ==
In 2012, Raz and Jargalan District was separated from Bojnord County in the establishment of Raz and Jargalan County, and Baghleq Rural District was created in the new Central District.

== Demographics ==
=== Population ===
At the time of the 2016 National Census, the rural district's population was 8,909 in 2,251 households. The most populous of its eight villages was Beyk Pulad, with 2,774 people.

=== Other villages in the rural district ===
- Ashraf Darreh
- Gaz
- Gonbadli
- Kariz
- Sangsar
- Tash Nafas
