= Raz Rural District =

Rural district in North Khorasan province, Iran

Raz Rural District Persian: دهستان راز
- Rural District
- Location within Iran
- Coordinates: 37°57′36″N 56°57′36″E
- Country: Iran
- Province: North Khorasan
- County: Raz and Jargalan
- District: Central
- Established: 1987
- Capital: Tangeh-ye Torkaman

Population (2016)
  - Total: 5,621
- Time zone: UTC+3:30 (IRST)

Raz Rural District (Persian: دهستان راز) is in the Central District of Raz and Jargalan County, North Khorasan province, Iran. Its capital is the village of Tangeh-ye Torkaman. The previous capital of the rural district was the village of Tangeh-ye Raz.

== Demographics ==
=== Population ===
At the time of the 2006 National Census, the rural district's population (as a part of the former Raz and Jargalan District in Bojnord County) was 6,059 in 1,424 households. There were 5,493 inhabitants in 1,461 households at the following census of 2011. The 2016 census measured the population of the rural district as 5,621 in 1,553 households, by which time the district had been separated from the county in the establishment of Raz and Jargalan County. The rural district was transferred to the new Central District. The most populous of its 30 villages was Tangeh-ye Torkaman, with 1,567 people.

=== Other villages in the rural district ===
- Abdollahabad
- Amanli
- Anabay
- Emam Darreh
- Esferuj
- Farah Din
- Guy Nik
- Jolof Darreh
- Kalateh-ye Shiru
- Pashindeh
- Qaleh-ye Qushin
- Qush Tappeh
- Zarneh
