= Raz, Iran =

City in North Khorasan province, Iran

Raz Persian: راز
- City
- Location within Iran
- Coordinates: 37°56′04″N 57°06′41″E
- Country: Iran
- Province: North Khorasan
- County: Raz and Jargalan
- District: Central

Population (2016)
  - Total: 5,029
- Time zone: UTC+3:30 (IRST)

Raz (Persian: راز) (Note: Also romanized as Rāz) is a city in the Central District of Raz and Jargalan County, North Khorasan province, Iran, serving as capital of both the county and the district.

== Demographics ==
=== Population ===
At the time of the 2006 National Census, the city's population was 4,735 in 1,282 households, when it was capital of the former Raz and Jargalan District in Bojnord County. The following census in 2011 counted 5,747 people in 1,526 households. The 2016 census measured the population of the city as 5,029 people in 1,535 households, by which time the district had been separated from the county in the establishment of Raz and Jargalan County. Raz was transferred to the new Central District as the county's capital.
