= Gholaman Rural District =

Rural district in North Khorasan province, Iran

Gholaman Rural District Persian: دهستان غلامان
- Rural District
- Location within Iran
- Coordinates: 38°03′36″N 57°11′24″E
- Country: Iran
- Province: North Khorasan
- County: Raz and Jargalan
- District: Gholaman
- Established: 1987
- Capital: Gholaman

Population (2016)
  - Total: 5,203
- Time zone: UTC+3:30 (IRST)

Gholaman Rural District (Persian: دهستان غلامان) is in Gholaman District of Raz and Jargalan County, North Khorasan province, Iran. Its capital is the village of Gholaman.

== Demographics ==
=== Population ===
At the time of the 2006 National Census, the rural district's population (as a part of the former Raz and Jargalan District in Bojnord County) was 13,965 in 3,297 households. There were 14,813 inhabitants in 3,879 households at the following census of 2011. The 2016 census measured the population of the rural district as 5,203 in 1,566 households, by which time the district had been separated from the county in the establishment of Raz and Jargalan County. The rural district was transferred to the new Gholaman District. The most populous of its four villages was Gholaman, with 2,867 people.

=== Other villages in the rural district ===
- Adineh Qoli
- Dashli Qaleh
- Tazeh Qaleh
