= Gholaman District =

District in North Khorasan province, Iran

Gholaman District Persian: بخش غلامان
- District
- Location within Iran
- Coordinates: 38°06′36″N 57°11′24″E
- Country: Iran
- Province: North Khorasan
- County: Raz and Jargalan
- Established: 2012
- Capital: Gholaman

Population (2016)
  - Total: 11,684
- Time zone: UTC+3:30 (IRST)

Gholaman District (Persian: بخش غلامان) is in Raz and Jargalan County, North Khorasan province, Iran. Its capital is the village of Gholaman.

== History ==
In 2012, Raz and Jargalan District was separated from Bojnord County in the establishment of Raz and Jargalan County, which was divided into three districts of two districts each, with the city of Raz as its capital and only city at the time.

== Demographics ==
=== Population ===
At the time of the 2016 National Census, the district's population was 11,684 inhabitants in 3,418 households.

=== Administrative divisions ===
Gholaman District Population
Administrative Divisions	2016
Gholaman RD	5,203
Rasteqan RD	6,481
Total	11,684
RD = Rural District
