= Jargalan Rural District =

Rural district in North Khorasan province, Iran

Jargalan Rural District Persian: دهستان جرگلان
- Rural District
- Location within Iran
- Coordinates: 38°10′12″N 56°42′00″E
- Country: Iran
- Province: North Khorasan
- County: Raz and Jargalan
- District: Jargalan
- Established: 1987
- Capital: Yekkeh Soud

Population (2016)
  - Total: 18,141
- Time zone: UTC+3:30 (IRST)

Jargalan Rural District (Persian: دهستان جرگلان) is in Jargalan District of Raz and Jargalan County, North Khorasan province, Iran. Its capital is the village of Yekkeh Soud. (Note: Formerly Yekkeh Soud-e Sofla)

== Demographics ==
=== Population ===
At the time of the 2006 National Census, the rural district's population (as a part of the former Raz and Jargalan District in Bojnord County) was 30,659 in 6,965 households. There were 32,981 inhabitants in 8,126 households at the following census of 2011. The 2016 census measured the population of the rural district as 18,141 in 4,646 households, by which time the district had been separated from the county in the establishment of Raz and Jargalan County. The rural district was transferred to the new Jargalan District. The most populous of its 20 villages was Yekkeh Soud, with 2,852 people.

=== Other villages in the rural district ===
- Ashraf ol Eslam
- Bahar
- Buyaqoli
- Duydukh-e Olya
- Gar Gaz
- Kalateh-ye Abrisham
- Karkuli
- Mazarlaq
- Mazraeh Chal Tak Pak
- Qarah Aqaj
- Qarah Qanlu
- Qarayeh Seydnur
- Qavolqa
- Quri Darreh
- Tutli-ye Olya
- Tutli-ye Sofla
- Yeylaq
