= Central District (Raz and Jargalan County) =

District in North Khorasan province, Iran

Central District (Raz and Jargalan County) Persian: بخش مرکزی شهرستان راز و جرگلان
- District
- Location within Iran
- Coordinates: 38°02′24″N 56°57′36″E
- Country: Iran
- Province: North Khorasan
- County: Raz and Jargalan
- Established: 2012
- Capital: Raz

Population (2016)
  - Total: 19,559
- Time zone: UTC+3:30 (IRST)

The Central District of Raz and Jargalan County (Persian: بخش مرکزی شهرستان راز و جرگلان) is in North Khorasan province, Iran. Its capital is the city of Raz.

== History ==
In 2012, Raz and Jargalan District was separated from Bojnord County in the establishment of Raz and Jargalan County, which was divided into three districts of two districts each, with Raz as its capital and only city at the time.

== Demographics ==
=== Population ===
At the time of the 2016 National Census, the district's population was 19,559 inhabitants in 5,339 households.

=== Administrative divisions ===
Central District (Raz and Jargalan County) Population
Administrative Divisions	2016
Baghleq RD	8,909
Raz RD	5,621
Raz (city)	5,029
Total	19,559
RD = Rural District
