= Jargalan District =

District in North Khorasan province, Iran

Jargalan District Persian: بخش جرگلان
- District
- Location within Iran
- Coordinates: 38°10′12″N 56°35′24″E
- Country: Iran
- Province: North Khorasan
- County: Raz and Jargalan
- Established: 2012
- Capital: Yekkeh Soud-e Sofla

Population (2016)
  - Total: 27,967
- Time zone: UTC+3:30 (IRST)

Jargalan District (Persian: بخش جرگلان) is in Raz and Jargalan County, North Khorasan province, Iran. Its capital is the village of Yekkeh Soud. (Note: Formerly Yekkeh Soud-e Sofla)

== History ==
In 2012, Raz and Jargalan District was separated from Bojnord County in the establishment of Raz and Jargalan County, which was divided into three districts of two districts each, with the city of Raz as its capital and only city at the time.

== Demographics ==
=== Population ===
At the time of the 2016 National Census, the district's population was 27,967 inhabitants in 7,146 households.

=== Administrative divisions ===
Jargalan District Population
Administrative Divisions	2016
Hesarcheh RD	9,826
Jargalan RD	18,141
Total	27,967
RD = Rural District
