= Raz and Jargalan County =

County in North Khorasan province, Iran

Raz and Jargalan County Persian: شهرستان راز و جرگلان
- County
- Location of Raz and Jargalan County in North Khorasan province (top, green)

- Location of North Khorasan province in Iran
- Coordinates: 38°03′N 56°51′E
- Country: Iran
- Province: North Khorasan
- Established: 2012
- Capital: Raz
- Districts: Central, Gholaman, Jargalan

Population (2016)
  - Total: 59,210
- Time zone: UTC+3:30 (IRST)

Raz and Jargalan County (Persian: شهرستان راز و جرگلان) is in North Khorasan province, Iran. Its capital is the city of Raz.

== History ==
In 2012, Raz and Jargalan District was separated from Bojnord County in the establishment of Raz and Jargalan County, which was divided into three districts of two districts each, with Raz as its capital and only city at the time.

== Demographics ==
=== Population ===
At the time of the 2016 National Census, the county's population was 59,210 in 15,903 households.

== Administrative divisions ==
Raz and Jargalan County's population and administrative structure are shown in the following table.

Raz and Jargalan County Population
Administrative Divisions	2016
Central District	19,559
Baghleq RD	8,909
Raz RD	5,621
Raz (city)	5,029
Gholaman District	11,684
Gholaman RD	5,203
Rasteqan RD	6,481
Jargalan District	27,967
Hesarcheh RD	9,826
Jargalan RD	18,141
Total	59,210
RD = Rural District

== See also ==
Media related to Raz and Jargalan County at Wikimedia Commons
