= Raz and Jargalan District =

Former district in North Khorasan province, Iran

Raz and Jargalan District Persian: بخش راز و جرگلان
- Former District
- Location within Iran
- Coordinates: 38°03′N 56°51′E
- Country: Iran
- Province: North Khorasan
- County: Bojnord
- Capital: Raz

Population (2011)
  - Total: 59,034
- Time zone: UTC+3:30 (IRST)

Raz and Jargalan District (Persian: بخش راز و جرگلان) is a former administrative division of Bojnord County, North Khorasan province, Iran. Its capital was the city of Raz.

== History ==
In 2012, the district was separated from the county in the establishment of Raz and Jargalan County.

== Demographics ==
=== Population ===
At the time of the 2006 National Census, the district's population was 55,418 in 12,968 households. The following census in 2011 counted 59,034 people in 14,992 households.

=== Administrative divisions ===
Raz and Jargalan District Population
| Administrative Divisions | 2006 | 2011 |
|---|---|---|
| Gholaman RD | 13,965 | 14,813 |
| Jargalan RD | 30,659 | 32,981 |
| Raz RD | 6,059 | 5,493 |
| Raz (city) | 4,735 | 5,747 |
| Total | 55,418 | 59,034 |
RD = Rural District
